= Breakfast martini =

Gin cocktail

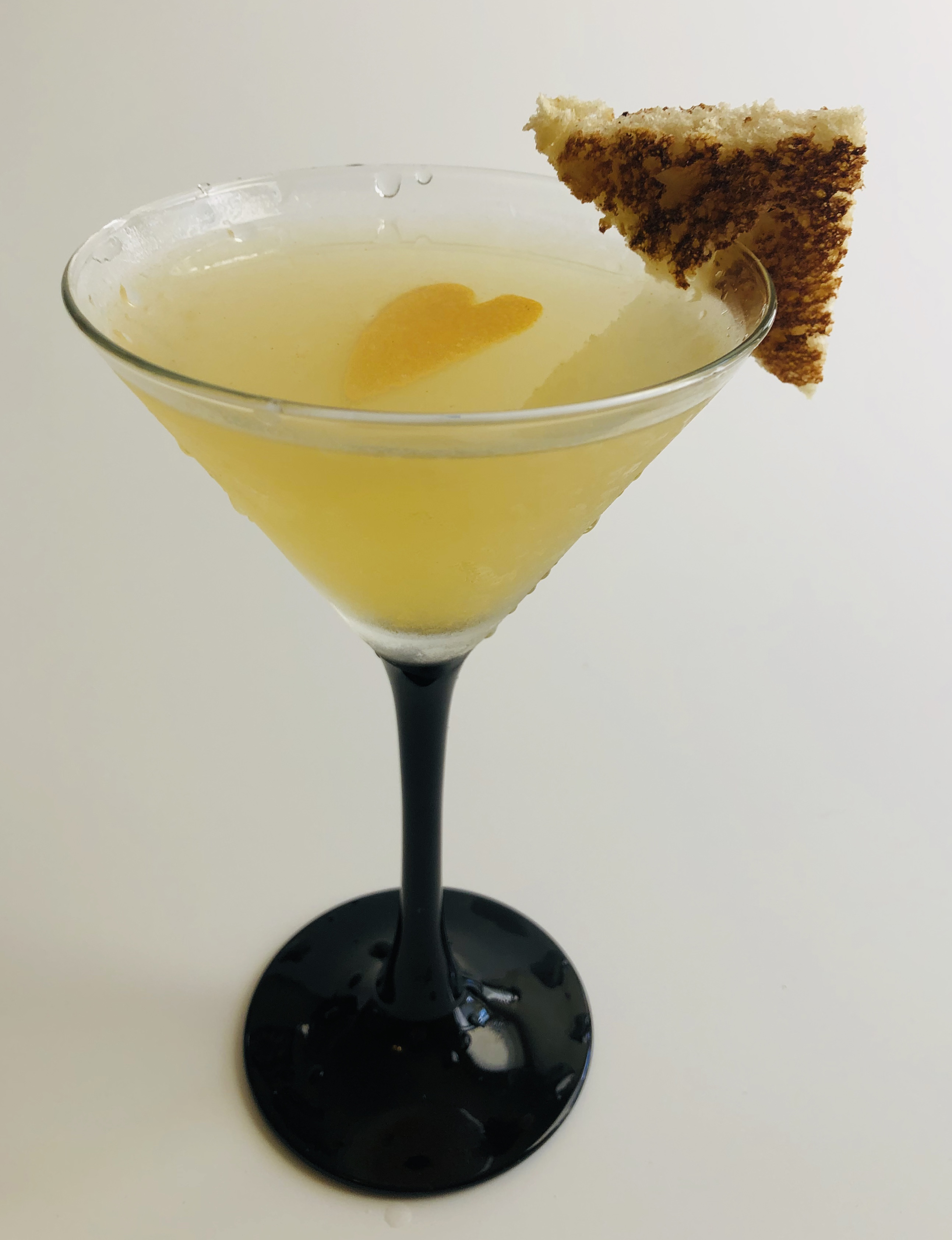
- Breakfast martini
- Type: Cocktail
- Ingredients: 2 shots (50 ml) gin 3/4 shot (18.75 ml) Cointreau or triple sec 3/4 shot fresh lemon juice 1 spoon orange marmalade
- Standard drinkware: Cocktail glass
- Standard garnish: lemon twist
- Served: Straight up: chilled, without ice
- Preparation: Mix or shake in cocktail shaker filled with ice cubes. Strain into glass and serve.

A breakfast martini is a marmalade cocktail with gin, marmalade, orange liqueur, and lemon juice (in place of vermouth), created by bartender Salvatore Calabrese. Although the drink contains no vermouth, the term "breakfast martini" is consistent with the trend of calling any straight liquor in a martini glass a "martini," such as the saketini or other variations.

The drink was invented in 1996 at the Library Bar at the Lanesborough Hotel in London, England. A similar drink, the Marmalade Cocktail, was invented in the 1920s by Harry Craddock and published in his standard reference book, the Savoy Cocktail Book.

The name has been applied to various other martini-style drinks as well.
