= Cocktail onion =

Pearl onion pickled in a brine

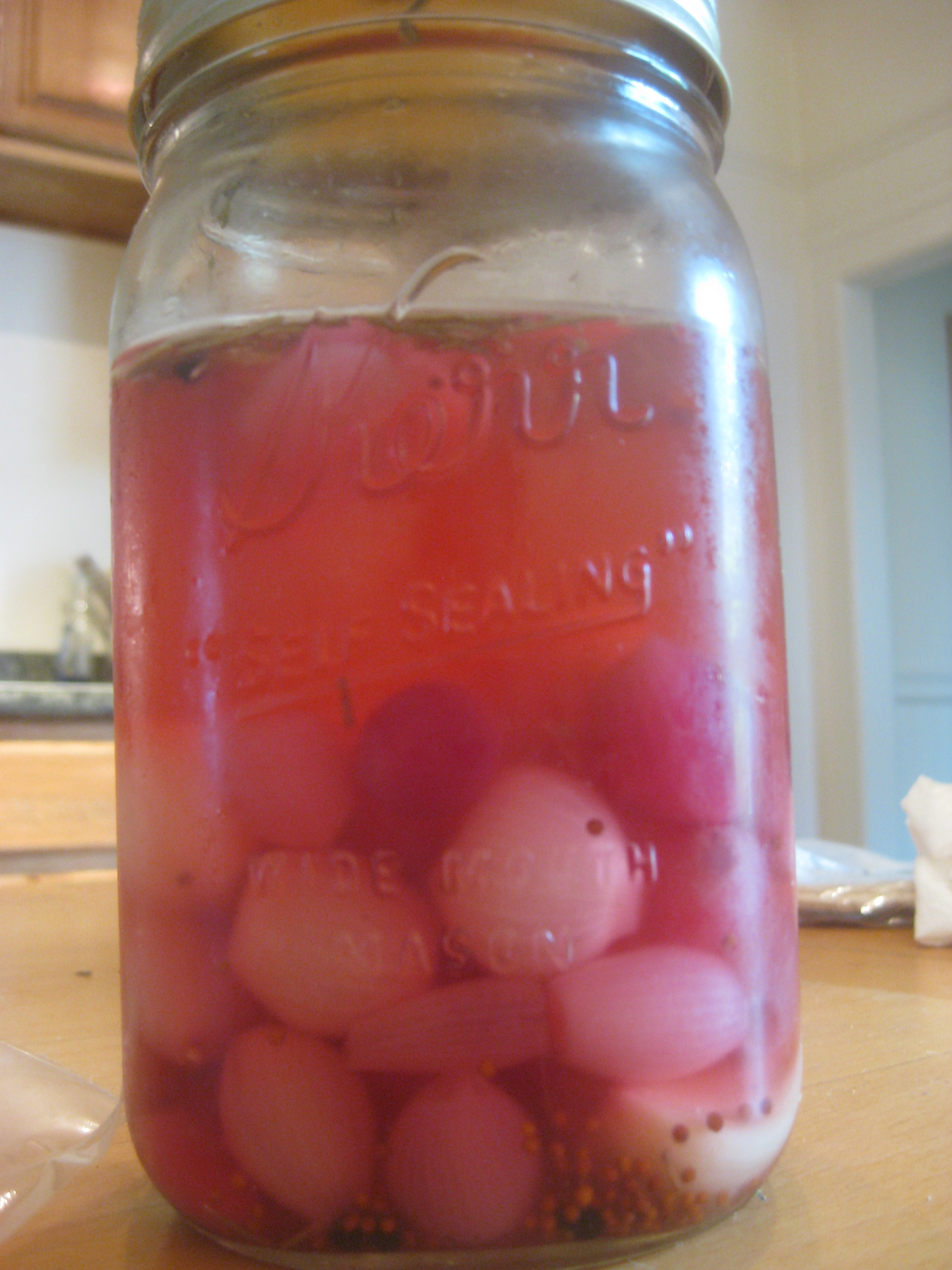
- A jar of cocktail onions.
- Type: Cocktail garnish

A cocktail onion is usually a pearl onion pickled in a brine with small amounts of turmeric and paprika. Pearl onions are usually chosen for their natural sweetness, but other sweet onions such as the crystal wax, also known as the white Bermuda, are also sometimes used. In many cases, white varieties of these sweet onions are used, since many consumers expect cocktail onions to be white. However, yellow or red sweet onions may be used as well. In northern California cuisine some haute bars may use sliced red onion pickled in vinegar. Some recipes also call for the onions to be packed in white vermouth instead.

Generally, the onion retains a slightly crunchy texture through the brining process, which can add a different mouthfeel to the drinking experience. Since the cocktail onion is made from a sweet onion, it is unlikely to upset the digestion with a sulfurous or eye-watering taste, although some cultures use more pungent onions as cocktail garnishes.

== Use as a garnish ==
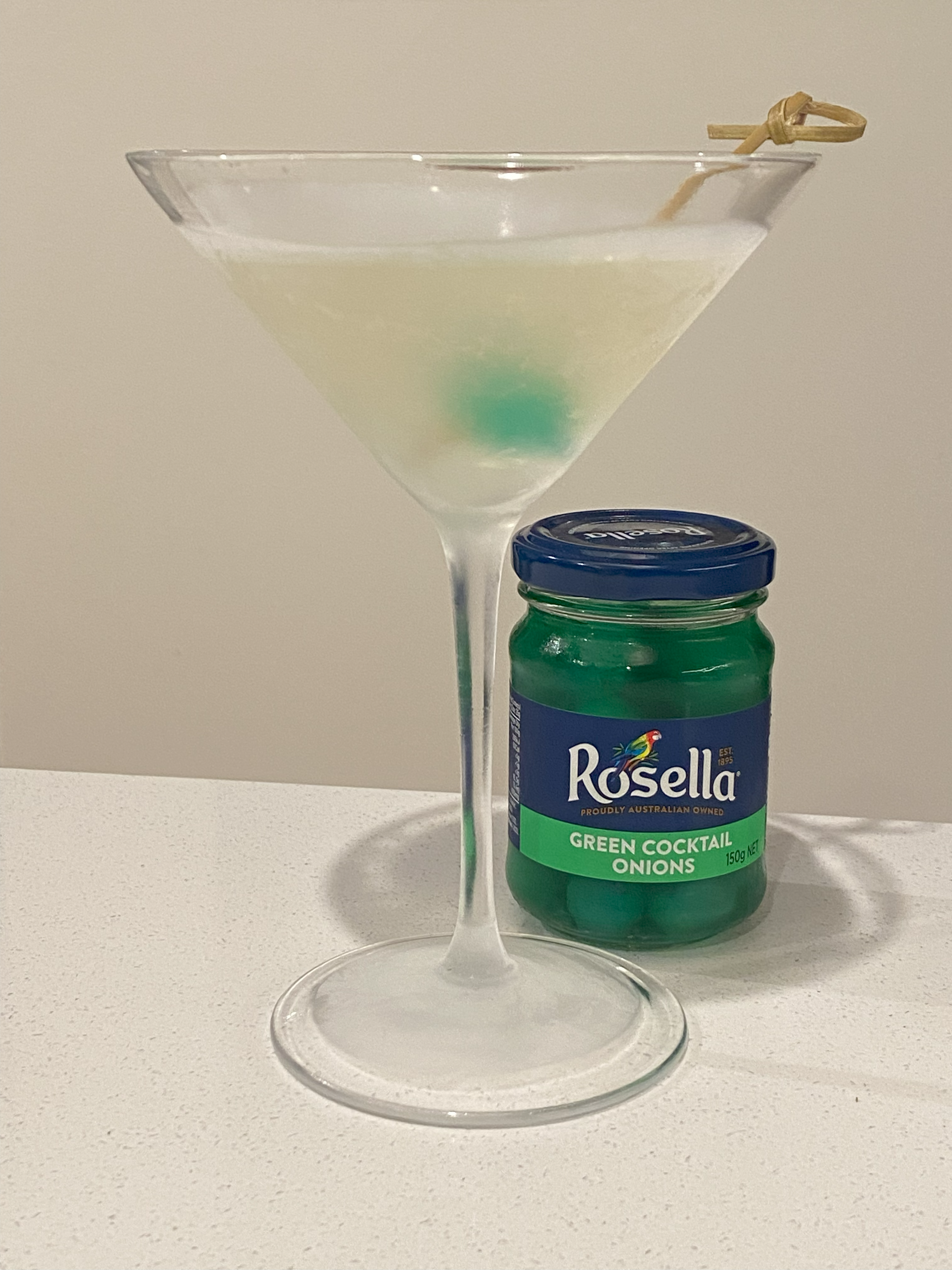
Gibson cocktail using green cocktail onion

While not as widely used as more common garnishes such as olives or lemon twists, the cocktail onion is the signature garnish of the Gibson, which consists of a standard Martini garnished with a cocktail onion instead of the standard olive.

== See also ==
- List of onion dishes
