= Pickled onion =

Onions pickled in a solution of vinegar or salt

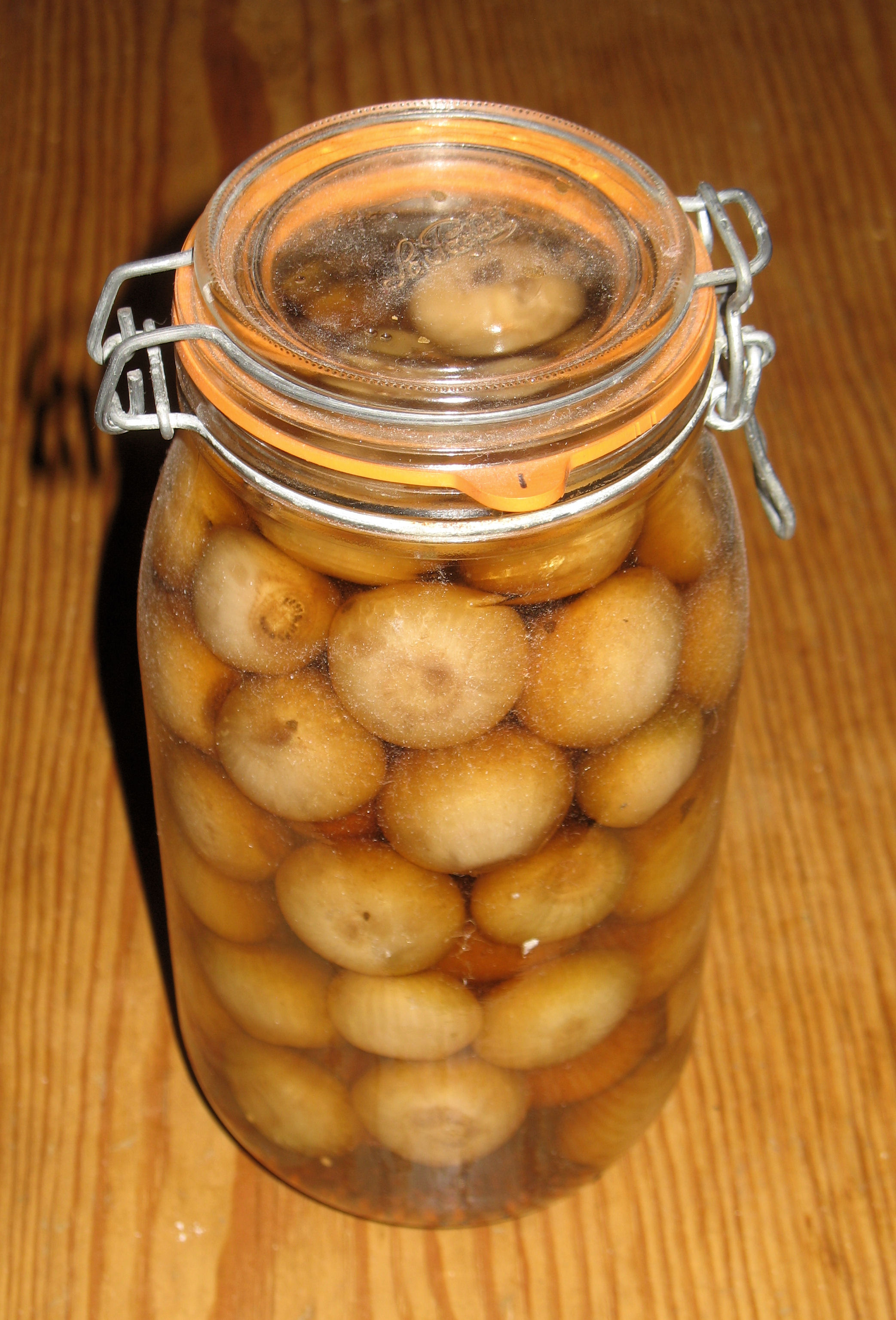
- A jar of homemade pickled onions in spiced malt vinegar
- Place of origin: Various
- Main ingredients: Onion
- Ingredients generally used: Vinegar, salt, spices

Pickled onions are a food item consisting of onions pickled in a solution of vinegar and salt, often with other preservatives and flavourings. There is a variety of small white pickled onions known as 'silverskin' onions; due to imperfections they are pickled instead of being wasted. They are frequently used as the distinguishing feature of a variation on the Martini cocktail, known as a Gibson.

Pickled onions are pickled in vinegar and can vary in size. Silverskin onions are pickled in white vinegar, and are considered to be small. Full sized onions, e.g., Spanish onions, can be pickled if sliced first.

== By country ==
In India, pickled onions or shallots called sirka sala pyaz are served with meals and tandoori foods. It is common in Indian restaurants and North Indian homes. Restaurants in India serve pickled onions, bright pink in colour in small bowls in the center of the table. In Hong Kong, pickled onions are served in many Cantonese restaurants, especially around dinner time, as a small dish before the main course is served.

In Mexican cuisine, one preparation, cebollas encurtidas, has sliced red onions pickled in a mixture of citrus juices and vinegar, which is served as a garnish or condiment. Sometimes cooked beets are added, producing a more strongly pink coloured dish. Pickled red onions in bitter orange juice are especially emblematic of Yucatán cuisine, where they are used as a garnish or condiment, especially for seafood.

In Switzerland, they are served to accompany raclette, along with pickled gherkins.

In the United Kingdom, the onions are traditionally eaten alongside fish and chips and with a ploughman's lunch. They are sometimes referred to simply as pickles.

In the United States, pickled onions are frequently served as a side dish and are also used as an ingredient in various regional recipes.

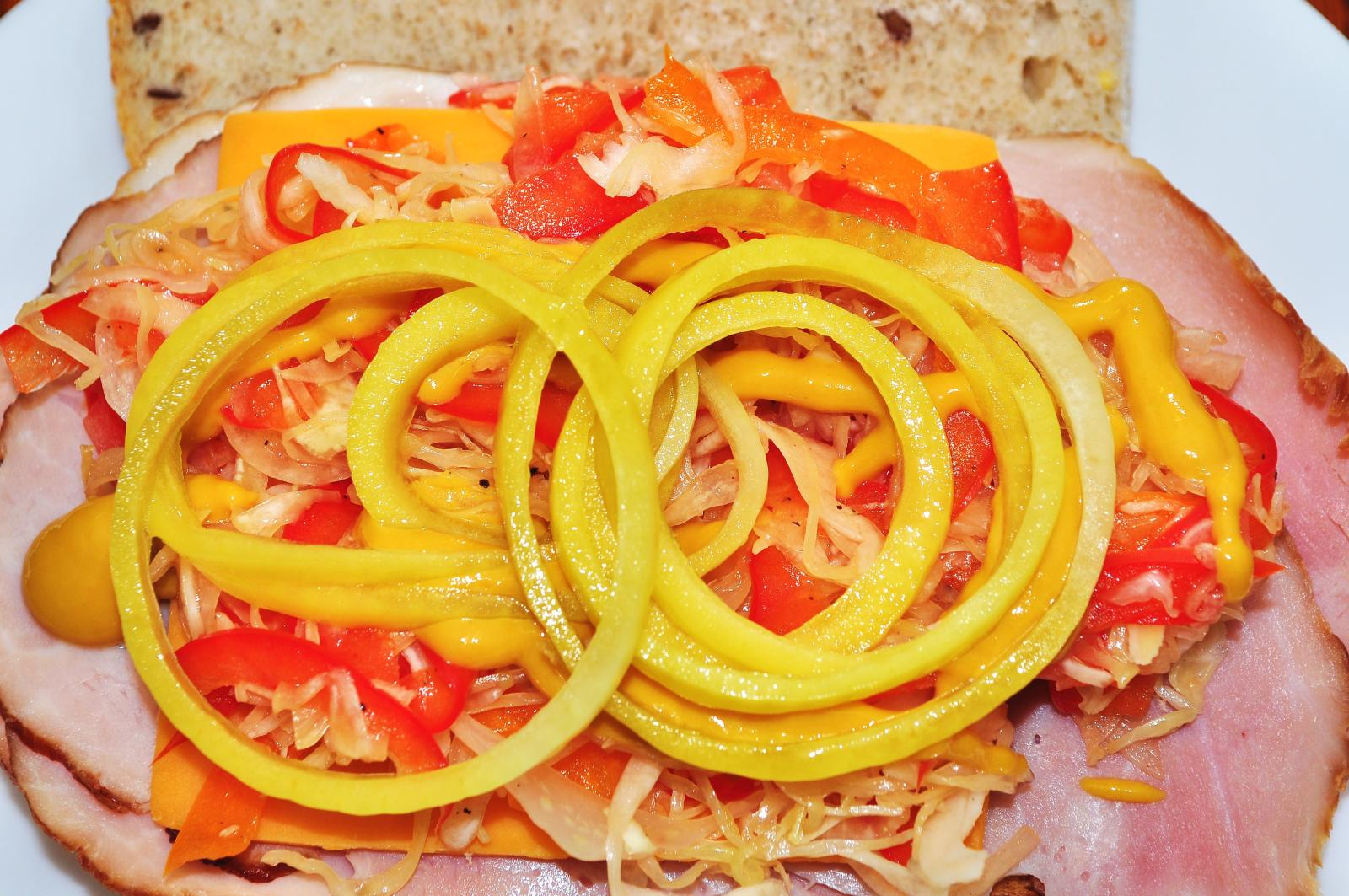
Sliced pickled onions atop a sandwich

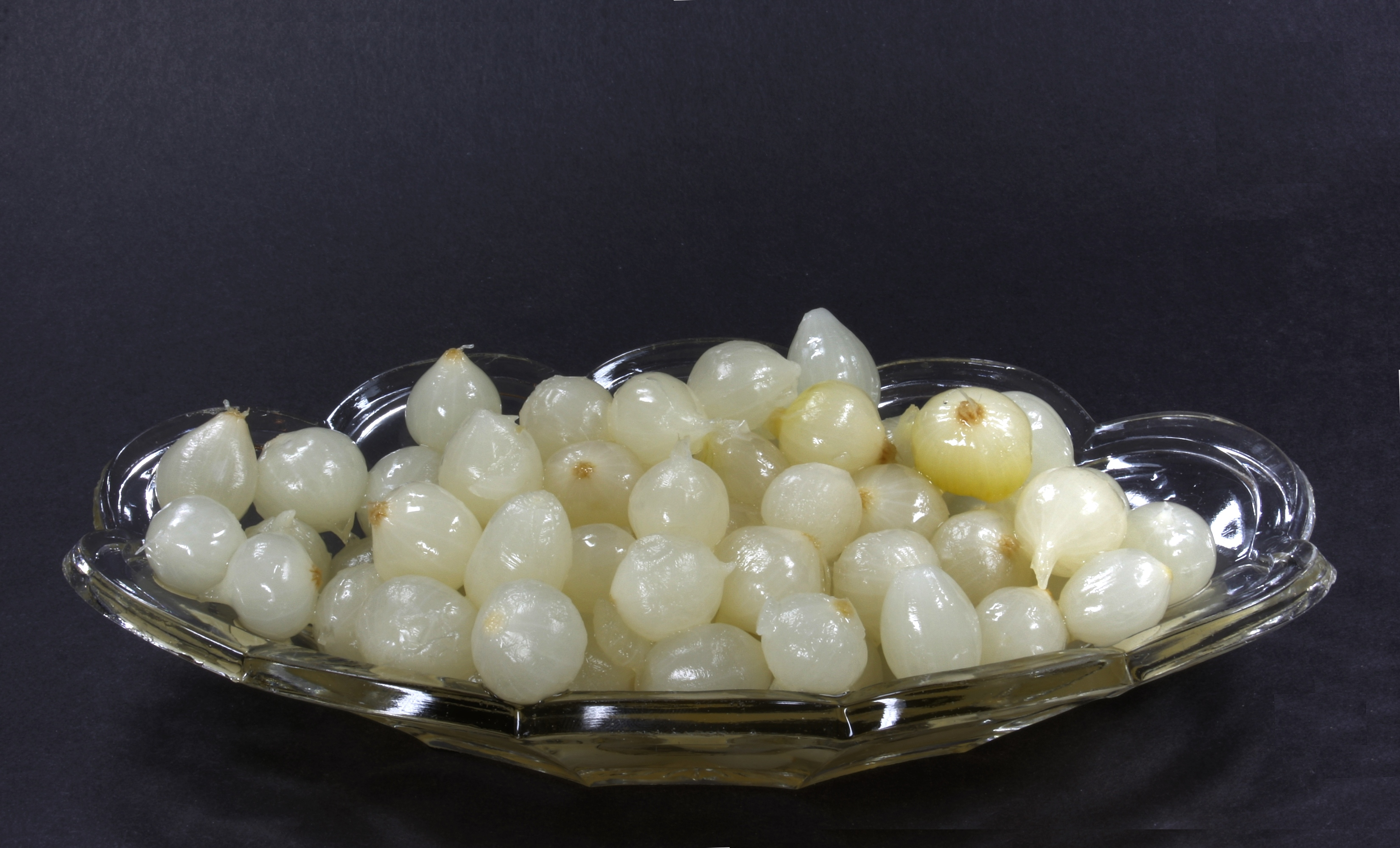
A dish of pickled silverskin onions

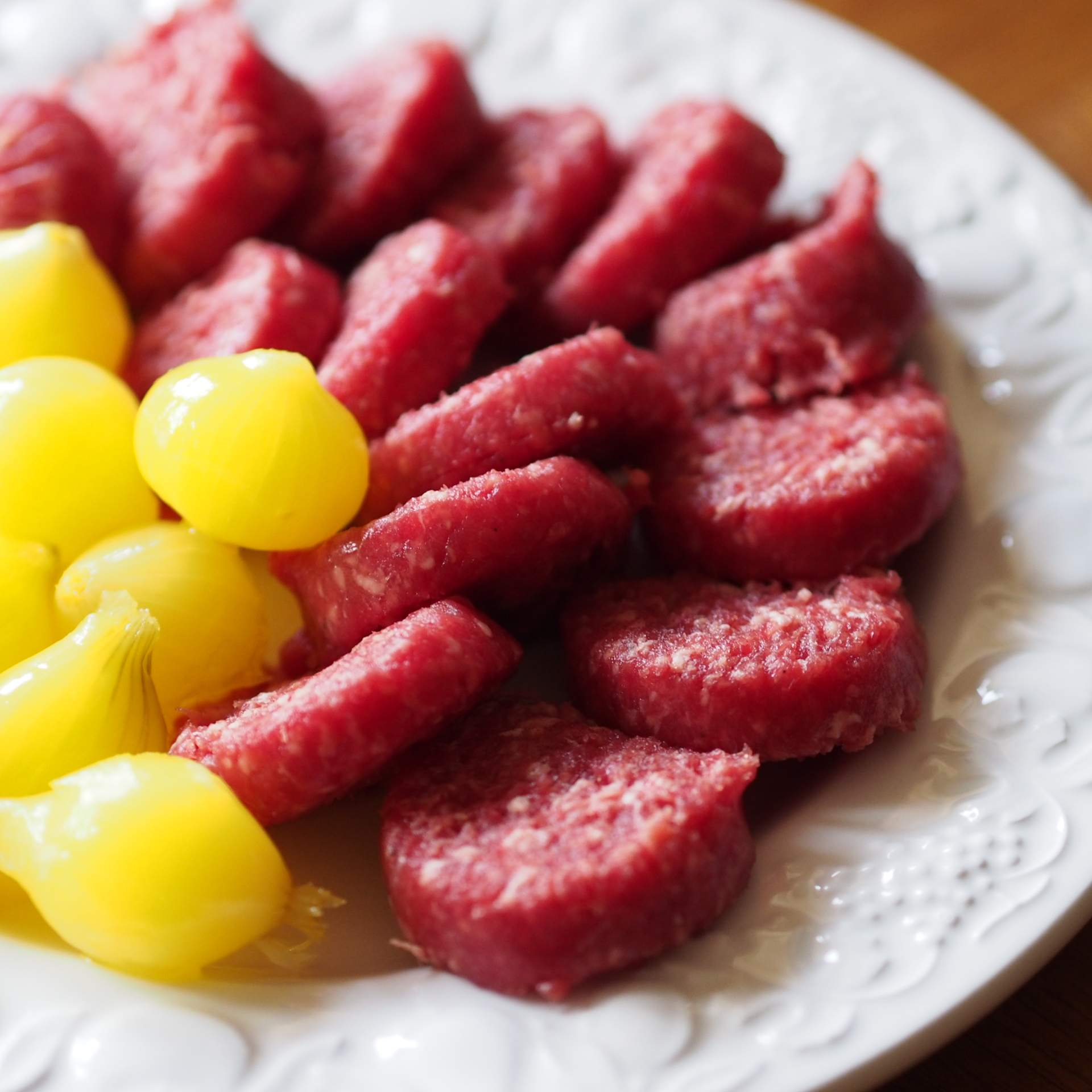
Dutch Amsterdamse uitjes (at left): small onions pickled with spices; the yellow colour is from either turmeric or saffron. Here served with ossenworst (smoked minced beef).

== See also ==
- List of pickled foods
