= Cosmopolitan (cocktail) =

Cocktail made with vodka

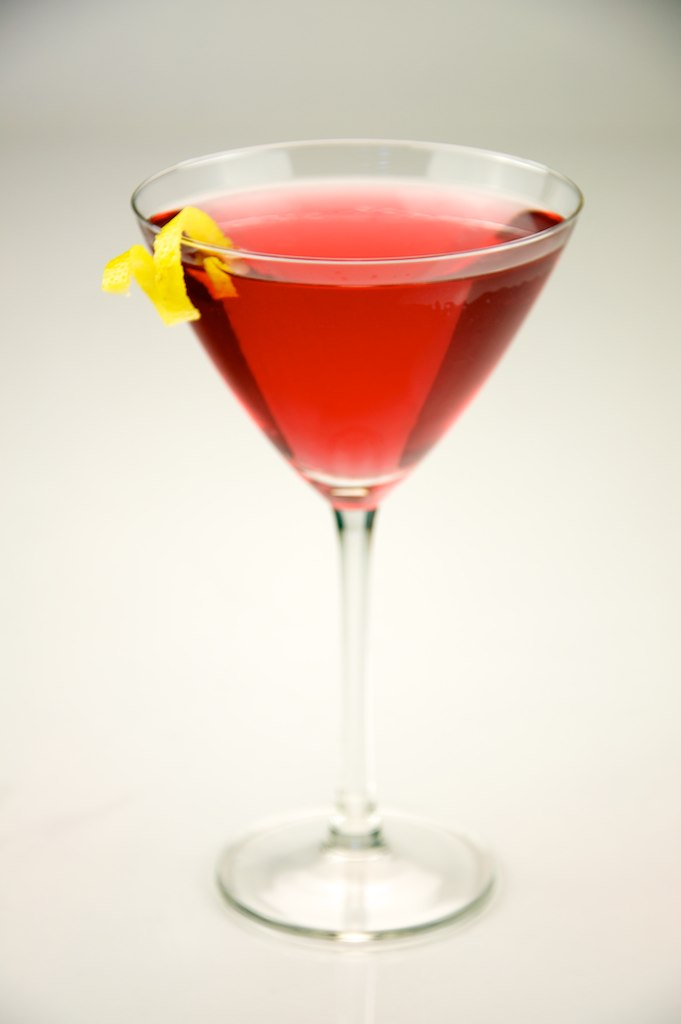
- A cosmopolitan garnished with a lemon twist
- Type: Cocktail
- Ingredients: 40 mL Vodka Citron; 15 mL Cointreau; 15 mL Fresh lime juice; 30 mL cranberry juice
- Standard drinkware: Cosmopolitan or cocktail glass
- Standard garnish: Lime slice
- Served: Straight up: chilled, without ice
- Preparation: Shake all ingredients in cocktail shaker filled with ice. Strain into a large cocktail glass. Garnish with lime slice.

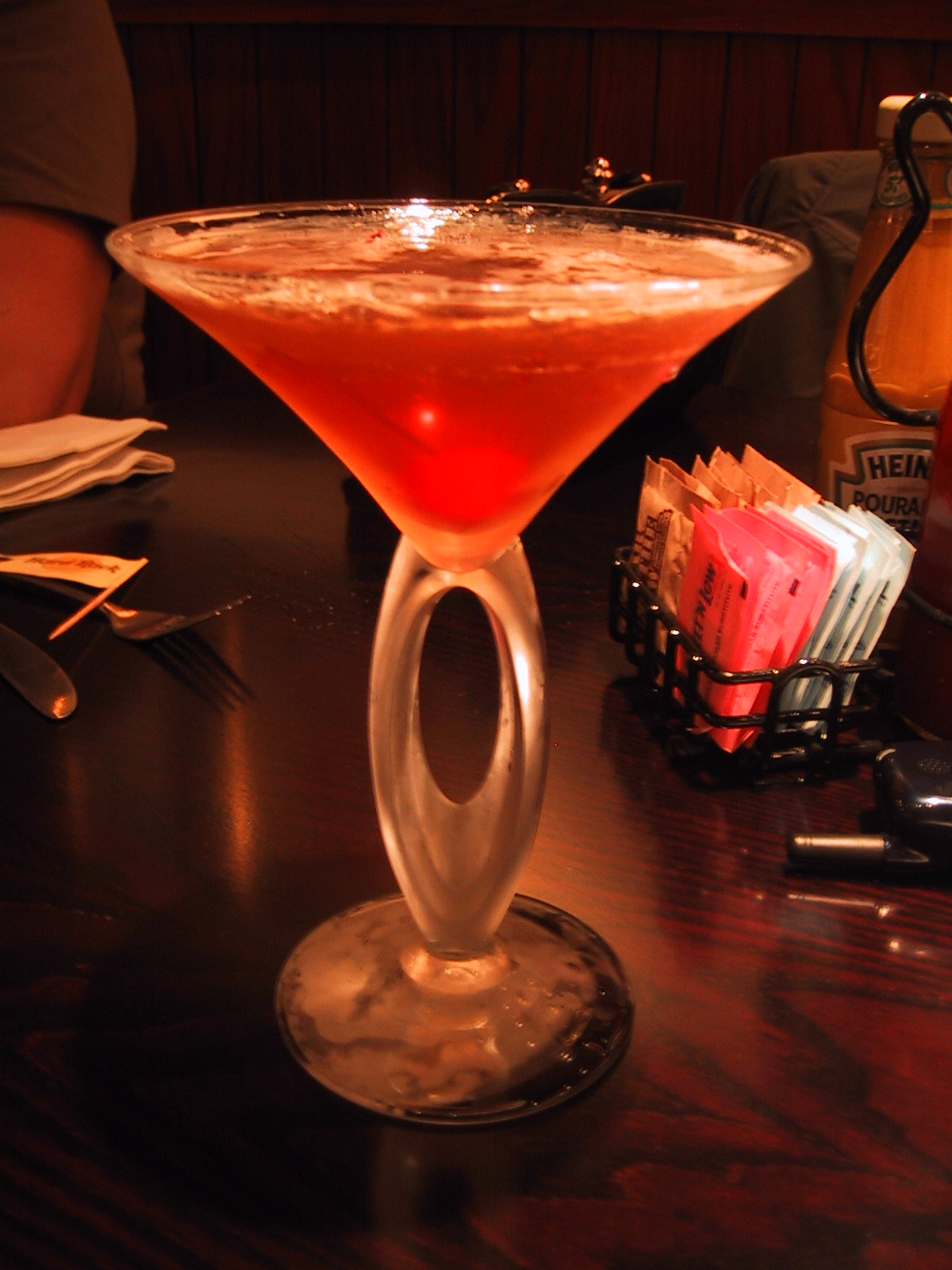
A cosmopolitan

A cosmopolitan, or, informally, a cosmo, is a cocktail made with vodka, Cointreau, cranberry juice, and freshly squeezed or sweetened lime juice. The traditional garnish is a lime slice but a twist or wedge can be used instead. Other variations substitute lemon or orange.

The cosmopolitan is a member of the Gimlet family of cocktails. Though often presented far differently, the cosmopolitan also bears a likeness in composition to the kamikaze shooter.

== Origins and mixology ==
The origin of the cosmopolitan is disputed, with some histories tracing it from the gay community in 1970s Provincetown, Massachusetts, moving west to Cleveland and Minneapolis, and landing in San Francisco. From there, it moved back east, with the contemporary recipe being mixed in 1989 in New York City. Another claim to the cosmo's origin is South Beach, Florida, in the mid-1980s.

Although the cocktail's origins are disputed, bartender Toby Cecchini is widely credited with creating the version of the cosmopolitan that became popular. Cecchini developed his recipe in 1988 while working at The Odeon in New York City, combining Absolut Citron vodka, Cointreau, fresh lime juice, and cranberry juice. In the mid-1990s, cocktail expert Dale DeGroff introduced a variation of the cosmopolitan featuring a flamed orange twist while working at the Rainbow Room.

== Preparation and serving ==
The International Bartenders Association recipe is based on vodka citron, a lemon-flavored vodka. Many bartenders, however, continue to use a standard unflavored vodka — this alternative would undoubtedly be historically consistent with any of the supposed predecessors of this drink that were popular in Ohio, Provincetown, or Minneapolis during the 1970s, or in San Francisco during the 1980s. A lemon twist is sometimes used to garnish.

The cosmopolitan is usually served in a large cocktail glass, also called a martini glass. For this reason, the drink is sometimes mistakenly categorized as a type of martini.

=== Various creation claims ===
==== The 1930s ====
While the cocktail is widely perceived to be a more modern creation, there is a recipe for a "Cosmopolitan Daisy" which appears in Pioneers of Mixing at Elite Bars 1903–1933, published in 1934:

Jigger of Gordon's Gin (1 1/2 US fl oz [44 mL] Beefeater)

2 dash Cointreau (1/2 US fl oz [15 mL] Cointreau)
Juice of 1 Lemon (1 US fl oz [30 mL] Lemon Juice)
1 tsp [5 mL] Raspberry Syrup (homemade)

Shake with ice and strain into a cocktail glass.

Made with ingredients that would have been readily available during the period, this identically named cocktail aims for the same effect. If this drink is, in fact, the source of the modern cosmopolitan, then it would be an adaptation of a Daisy rather than a Kamikaze.

==== c. 1970s: Provincetown ====
One version of the creation of this popular drink credits the accomplishment to the gay community in Provincetown, Massachusetts.

==== 1970s: John Caine ====
John Caine is the owner of several popular bars in San Francisco and a cosmopolitan expert. He partially credits the upsurge in cocktails during the 1970s to the Cosmo being served at fern bars. Caine is credited with bringing the Cosmo west from Cleveland.

==== 1975: Neal Murray ====
Bartender Neal Murray says he created the cosmopolitan in 1975 at the Cork & Cleaver steak house in Minneapolis, Minnesota. According to Murray, he added a splash of cranberry juice to a Kamikaze and the first taster declared, "How cosmopolitan."

Murray's Cosmopolitan used 1.5 oz Gordon's vodka, .75 oz Rose's Lime, .75 oz Leroux triple sec, and .5 oz cranberry juice.

==== c. 1985: Cheryl Cook ====
There are several other claims made as to the origin of the cosmopolitan. Cocktail historian Gary Regan credits bartender Cheryl Cook of the Strand Restaurant in South Beach, Florida, with the original creation. In a letter to Regan, Cook related the story of how she created the drink in 1985 or 1986:

What overwhelmed me was the number of people who ordered Martinis just to be seen with a Martini glass in their hand. It was on this realization that gave me the idea to create a drink that everyone could palate and was visually stunning in that classic glass. This is what the Cosmo was based on.

Cook's original recipes called for "Absolut Citron, a splash of Triple sec, a drop of Rose's lime and just enough cranberry to make it oh so pretty in pink." Although Absolut Citron was not introduced anywhere officially until 1988, it was test-marketed in Miami.

==== 1987: Patrick "Paddy" Mitten ====
Cheryl Charming's The Cocktail Companion credits a bartender named Patrick "Paddy" Mitten with bringing the drink to New York City from San Francisco in October 1987.

==== 1989: Toby Cecchini & Melissa Huffsmith-Roth ====
Bartender Gaz Regan says that the internationally recognized version of the cocktail was created by Toby Cecchini and Melissa Huffsmith-Roth in 1989 at The Odeon, a restaurant in Manhattan, based on a poorly described version of Cheryl Cook's creation. Cecchini and Huffsmith-Roth's Cosmopolitan includes 2 oz Absolut Citron vodka, 1 oz Cointreau, 1 oz lime juice, and .5 oz cranberry juice. Other sources give Cecchini sole credit for the contemporary drink's invention.

==== 1993: New York City ====
According to Sally Ann Berk and Bob Sennett, the Cosmopolitan appears in literature as early as 1993 and derives from New York City.

== Popularity ==
The cosmopolitan gained popularity in the 1990s thanks in part to Madonna. Dale DeGroff explains that after the singer was spotted drinking one in 1996, overnight he received calls across the globe, "as far away as Germany and Australia" for the recipe.

It was later frequently mentioned on the television program Sex and the City, in which Sarah Jessica Parker's character, Carrie Bradshaw, commonly ordered the drink when out with her girlfriends. The trend was spoofed in the 2008 film adaptation when Miranda Hobbes asks Carrie why she ceased drinking them, to which Carrie replies, "Because everyone else started."

== Variations ==
- One variation calls for stirring in a mixing glass, instead of shaking.
- An alternative ingredient in substitution for Cointreau is a variation of the French Martini.
- The Real Housewives of New Jersey star Kathy Wakile created a Red Velvet Cosmo, based on one of her favorite desserts, red velvet cake.
- For a virgin cosmopolitan, replace the vodka and triple sec with orange juice and pink lemonade.
- For a "constipolitan," use prune juice in place of cranberry juice.
- A CosNOpolitan, from Kimbal Musk's The Kitchen, has cranberry juice, lime, orange bitters, and soda.

== See also ==
- List of cocktails
- Martini
