= Three-martini lunch =

Business lunch

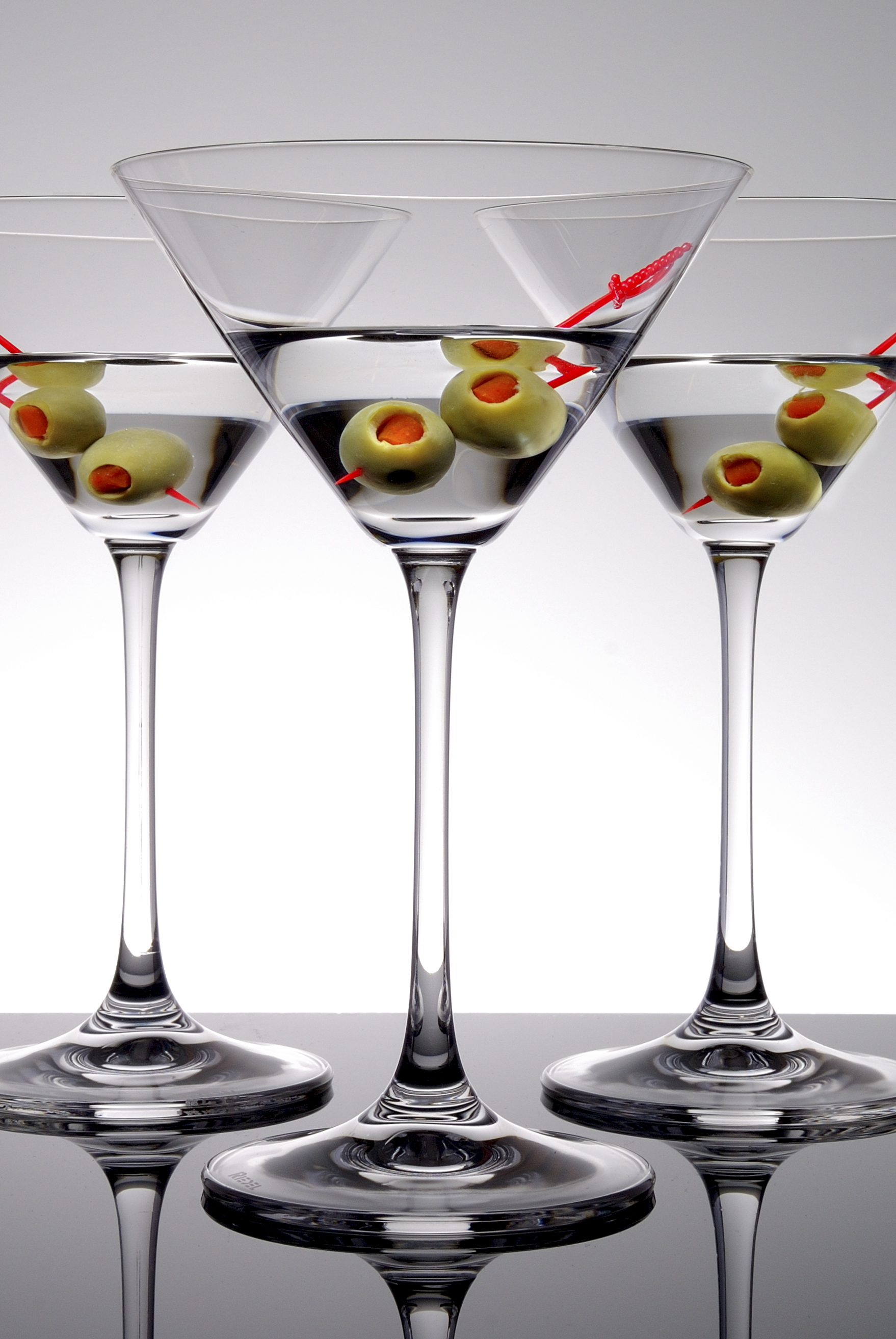
Three martinis with olives as a garnish

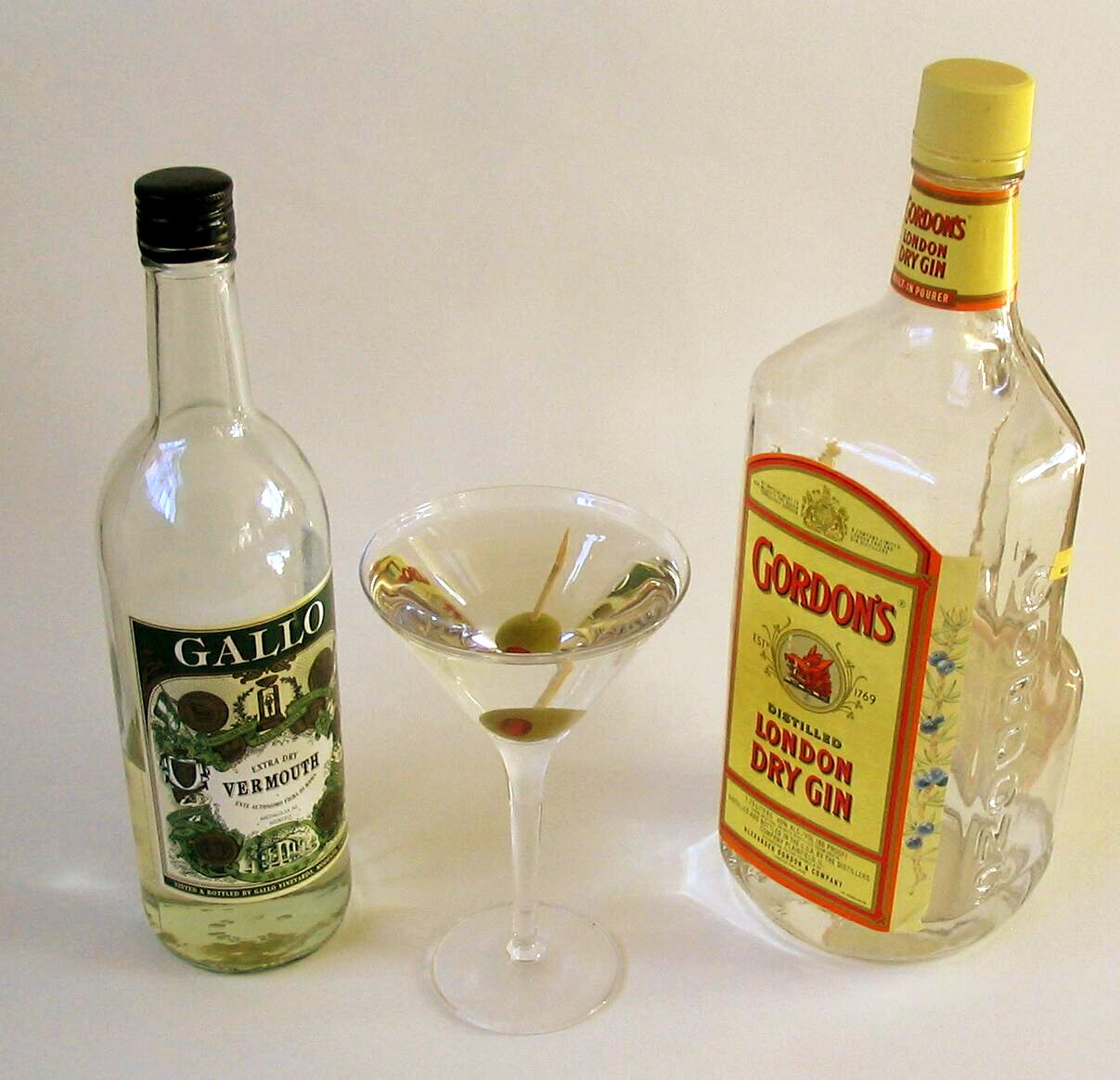
A martini: gin, vermouth, olive

In the United States, the three-martini lunch or noontime three-martini is a leisurely, indulgent lunch enjoyed by businesspeople or lawyers. It is named from the common belief that many people in the above-mentioned professions have enough leisure time and wherewithal to consume more than one martini during the work day. The three-martini lunch became particularly identified in popular culture with Madison Avenue advertising executives in the 1960s and 1970s, who supposedly became more creative after such lunchtime libations.

The term is sometimes used in political debates on tax deductibility of business meals in the United States.

== Decline ==
The three-martini lunch is no longer common practice for several reasons; these include the implementation of "fitness for duty" programs by numerous companies, the decreased tolerance of alcohol use, a general decrease in available leisure time for business executives and an increase in the size of the martini.

President John F. Kennedy called for a crackdown on such tax breaks in 1961, but nothing was done at the time. Jimmy Carter condemned the practice during the 1976 presidential campaign. Carter portrayed it as part of the unfairness in the nation's tax laws, claiming that the working class was subsidizing the "$50 martini lunch". A "rich businessman" could write off this type of lunch as a business expense, thereby reducing the cost by his effective tax rate. His opponent, Gerald Ford, in a 1978 speech to the National Restaurant Association, responded with: "The three-martini lunch is the epitome of American efficiency. Where else can you get an earful, a bellyful and a snootful at the same time?"

== Recent times ==
It was once popular in Washington, D.C., but has declined since the early 1990s. The practice has also been affected by changing views on alcohol consumption, while others have chosen to go with new drinks like the vodka martini and cosmopolitan. The cost of some drinks has increased three times faster than the inflation rate.

The entertainment deduction, which includes meals, was reduced to 80 percent in 1987 and to 50 percent in 1994.

Comedian George Carlin once commented that the crackdown on the three-martini lunch "shouldn't affect the working man's two-joint coffee break".

== See also ==
- List of cocktails
