= Nicotini =

Alcoholic drink with nicotine

A nicotini refers to any alcoholic drink that includes nicotine as an ingredient. Nicotinis are often made by infusing vodka with tobacco leaves, which is said to give the resulting beverage a 'smoky' flavor.

== Etymology ==
Its name is modeled after the word "martini" in the fashion of such drinks as the appletini.

== Usage and history ==
In places which ban smoking, use of the nicotini provides smokers with the opportunity to manage cravings without stepping outside to smoke. Where nicotinis are not sold, a similar experience can be had by consuming a nicotine replacement therapy product such as nicotine chewing gum, followed by the consumption of an alcoholic beverage.

== Ingredients and variations ==
Nicotine replacement therapy products may be used to add a verified quantity of nicotine to produce a nicotini. The New York Times Magazine reported that one variation of the nicotina includes Kahlúa, a coffee-flavored liquor.

== Health risks ==
Tobacco and nicotine use increase alcohol craving. Nicotine poisoning may occur from homemade tobacco infused drinks due to varying quantity of nicotine.

== See also ==
- Caffeinated alcoholic drink
