= Dukes Hotel =

Hotel in London, United Kingdom

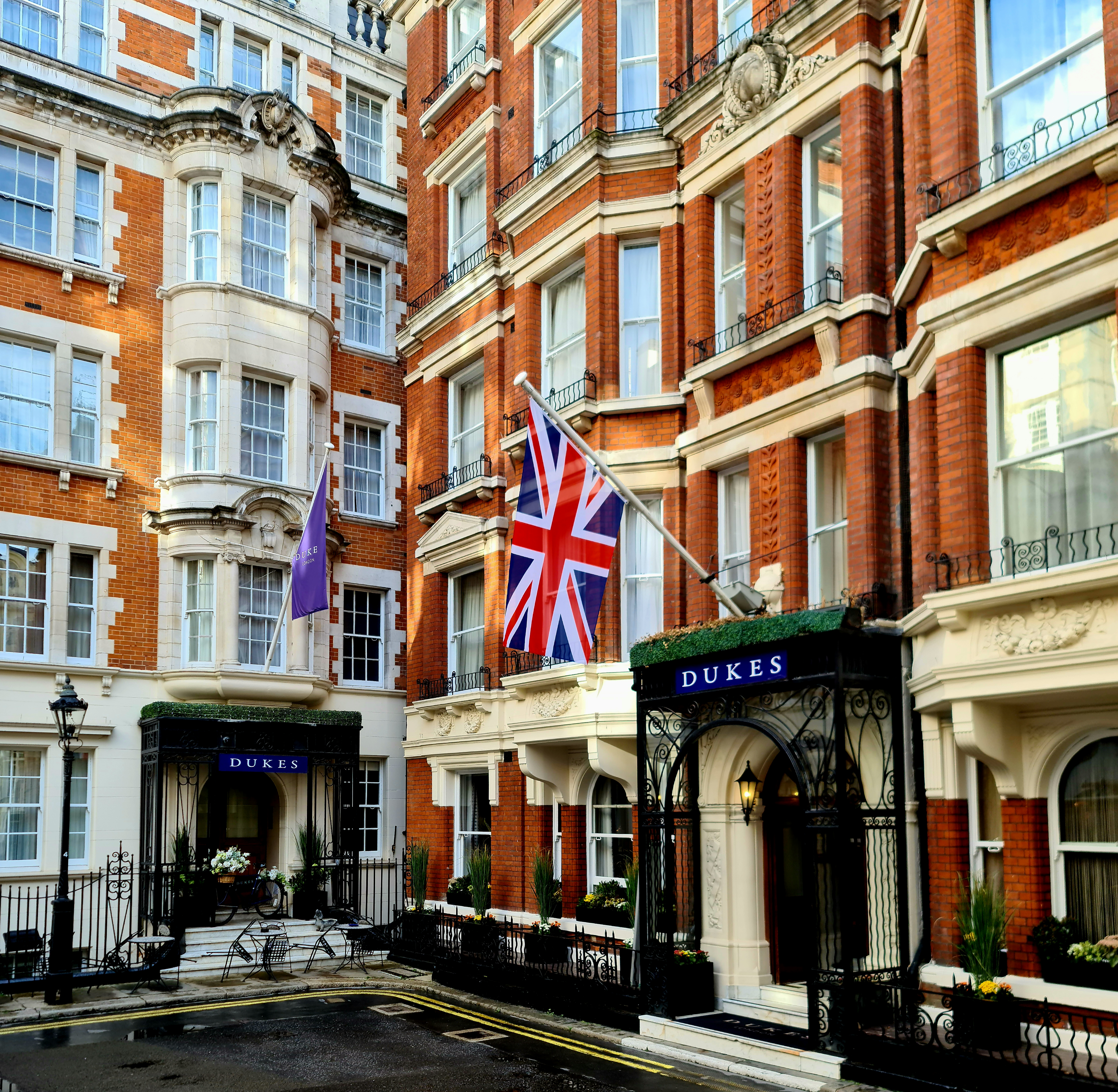

General information
- Location: 35 and 36 St James's Place, St James's, London, England
- Coordinates: 51.5055°N 0.1395°W
- Opening: 1908
- Operator: Seven Tides International

Other information
- Number of rooms: 90

Website
- www.dukeshotel.com

Dukes Hotel, now known just as Dukes, is a luxury 90 room/suite hotel at 35 and 36 St James's Place, London, founded in 1908. Previous guests have included the composer Edward Elgar, the author Ian Fleming, and various members of the British royal family.

== History ==
The close in which the hotel is situated was once known as Cleveland Court, which was named after Cleveland House, the London residence of the Duchess of Cleveland, a mistress of Charles II. In 1801, Henry Thomas Austen, brother of the novelist Jane Austen, had offices in Cleveland Court.

== Hotel and bar ==
According to The Daily Telegraph, the hotel is "reassuringly old-fashioned". Jack Brooksbank, Princess Eugenie's husband, is reported to have told Richard Eden, the Daily Mail's royalty editor, that there is a secret tunnel from the nearby St James's Palace to Dukes Bar. From the hotel itself, Dukes Bar is accessed via "a small, unmarked door". The clientele were once described as a typical Mayfair set: "wealthy, tawdry, and slightly disreputable" but fading into the background after a couple of the bar's martinis.

== Guests ==
Past guests have included the composer Edward Elgar, who often visited, and the James Bond author Ian Fleming who frequented Dukes Bar where he decided that Bond's favoured drink would be a vodka martini, "shaken, not stirred". The Vesper Martini is the Dukes Bar "signature drink" and includes five shots of gin, with a two-drink limit; any attempt to purchase a third one will be declined.

Queen Elizabeth The Queen Mother is rumoured to have been a regular, as well as Diana, Princess of Wales, who had "a small table in the drawing room permanently reserved" for afternoon tea.
