= Appletini =

Apple-flavored vodka cocktail

Appletini (aka apple martini)
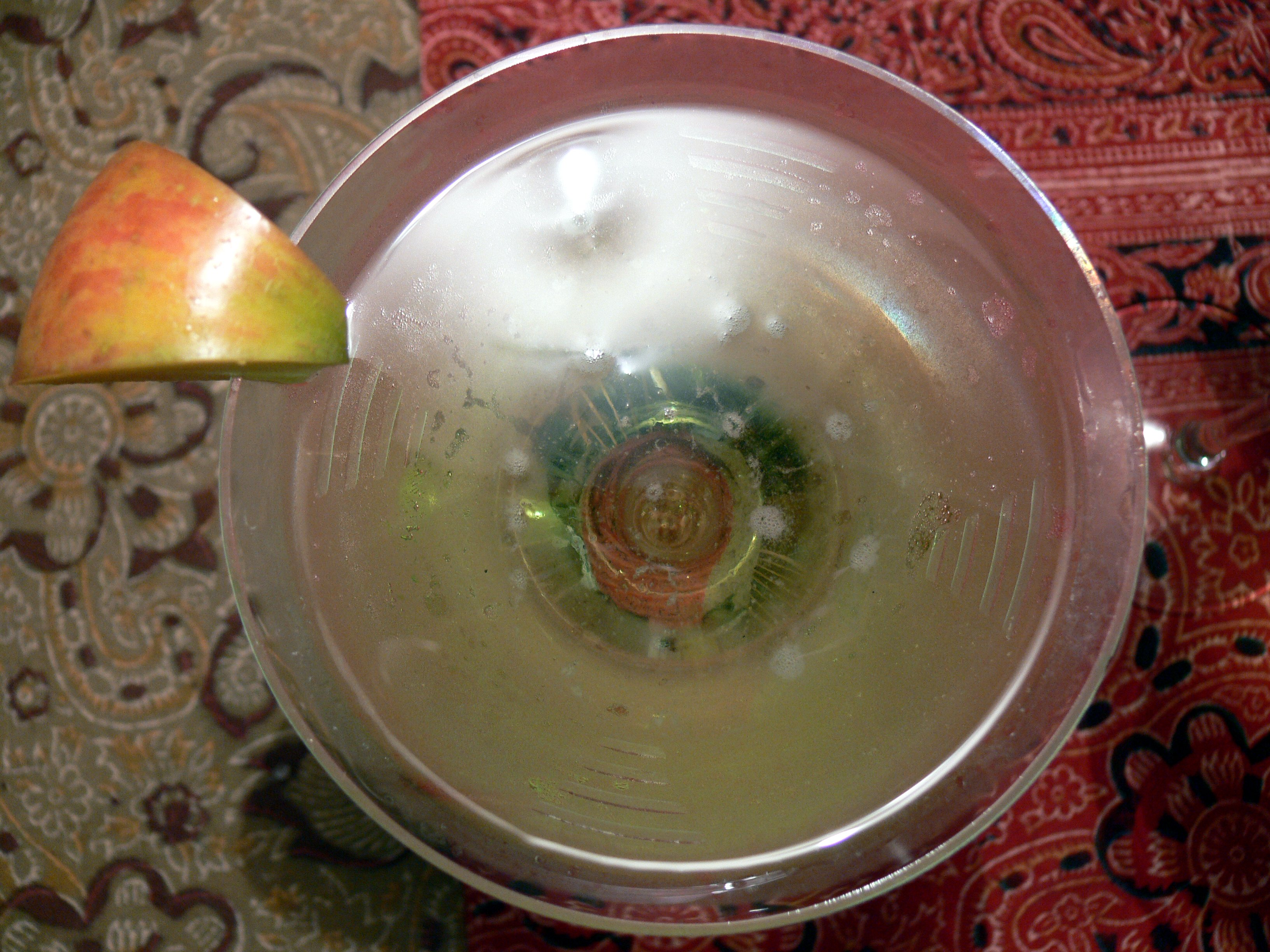
- Top view of an apple martini
- Type: Mixed drink
- Ingredients: 4.5 cl (3 parts) Vodka; 1.5 cl (1 part) Apple schnapps / Calvados; 1.5 cl (1 part) Cointreau
- Standard drinkware: Cocktail glass
- Standard garnish: Apple slice; Cherry
- Served: Straight up
- Preparation: Mix in a shaker, then pour into a chilled glass. Garnish and serve.

An apple martini (appletini for short) is a cocktail containing vodka and one or more of apple juice, apple cider, apple liqueur, or apple brandy. Although the drink contains no vermouth by default, the term "apple martini" is consistent with the trend of calling any straight liquor in a martini glass a "martini," such as the saketini or other variations.

This drink, originally called an Adam's Apple Martini because the bartender who created it was named Adam, was created in 1996 at Lola's West Hollywood restaurant.

== Recipe ==
In its purest form, it would contain:

4 cl (1 1/2 oz) top shelf vodka (or gin)
2 cl (2/3 oz) apple juice, cider or, most often, apple pucker

Typically, the ingredients are shaken or stirred and then strained into a cocktail glass.

=== Variations ===
A sweet and sour mix can also be added before shaking.

Optionally, vermouth may be included, as in a regular martini.

A similar cocktail can be made with Martini Bianco white vermouth and apple juice in a long drink glass filled with ice.

== In popular culture ==
TV and movies have used male characters drinking Appletinis to signify them as effeminate and presenting as gay, seen most prominently in the case of John "J.D." Dorian in Scrubs. The characterization is seen in other depictions such as Phil Dunphy in Modern Family, Alan Harper in Two and a Half Men and Ted Mosby in How I Met Your Mother. Professional wrestler Christopher Daniels incorporated the drinking of appletinis into his heel, "snarky [and] sarcastic", character work beginning in 2012 for Total Nonstop Action. Other media depict the cocktail as drunk by "college-aged girls" and "uncultured types".

== See also ==
- List of cocktails
