= Cheryl Charming =

American bar professional and author

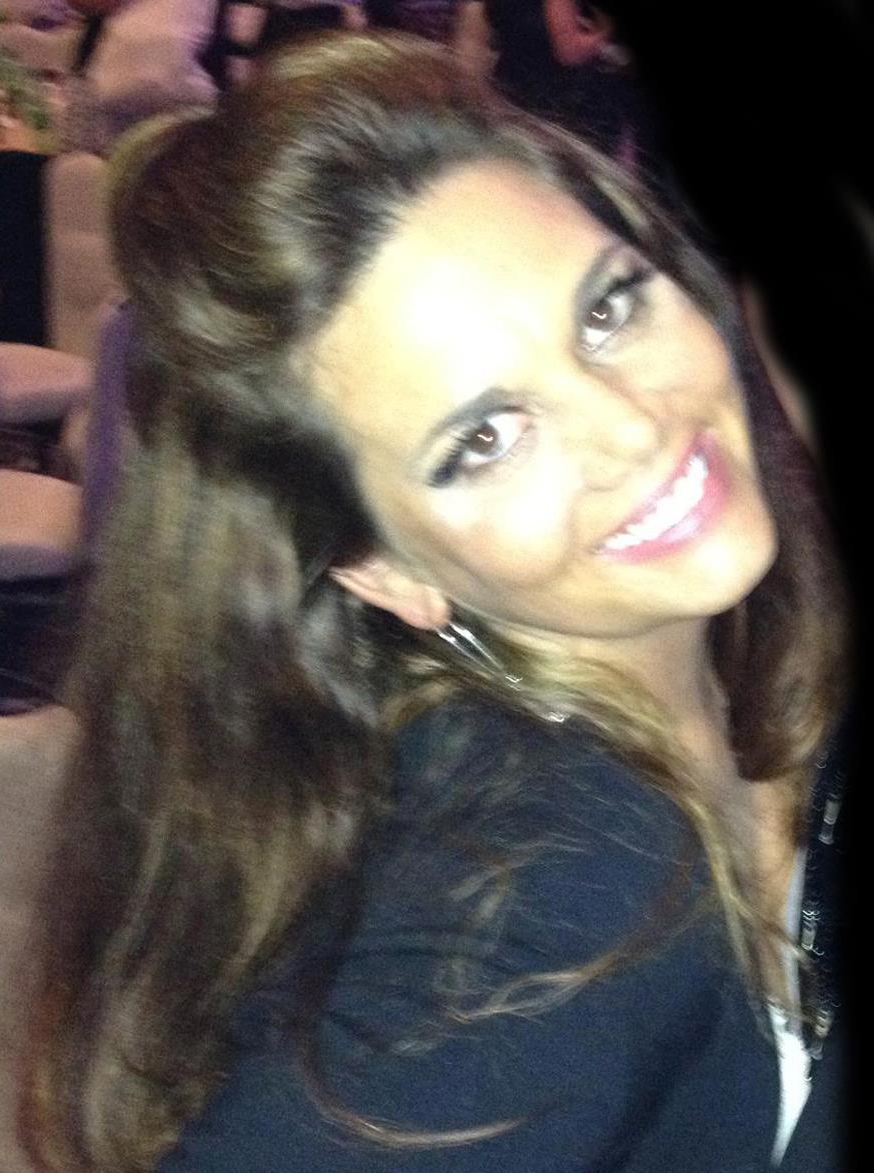
- 2012 Cheryl Charming at a cocktail awards event in New Orleans.
- Born: Cheryl Caple; November 19, 1960 (age 64); Azusa, California
- Known for: Writer

Cheryl Charming (born November 19, 1960) is an American bar professional and published author of 16 books on cocktails and bartending. She currently works as the Bar Director at the Bourbon "O” Bar in New Orleans, Louisiana, and in 2014 was named the New Orleans Magazine Mixologist of the Year. She is nationally known for her bartending and books.

== Early life ==
Charming was born on November 19, 1960, in Azusa, California, to Barbara and Gordon Caple. In 1965, the family moved to Little Rock, Arkansas.

While attending Bryant High School, Cheryl took her first job at age 16 as a waitress at a pizza parlor. This gave her the experience to obtain a food waitress position at John Barleycorn's Vision, a restaurant & bar in Little Rock with many themed rooms. A cocktail server called in sick one night and she was asked to cover the position – her bar career began. Later, Cheryl took a job as a cocktail server at the Cabaret on Kavanaugh Blvd. in the Heights. After six months, owner Lynda Johnson promoted her to head bartender. Cheryl found herself serving minor celebrities such as President Bill Clinton's brother and Gennifer Flowers.

== Career ==
Charming's first bartending job was at a cabaret nightclub in Arkansas. tending bar for five years aboard a Royal Caribbean cruise ship, Charming began working at Walt Disney World in Orlando, Florida, in 1989. She was part of the opening team of Pleasure Island. Later she transferred to the Grand Floridian Beach Resort & Spa where she tended the beach bar serving the rich and famous. There, her knack for bar tricks and bar magic earned her a job teaching those skills to other Disney cast members through Disney's food and beverage training program called Quest for the Best.

Bar tricks and bar magic was the subject of Charming's first book, Miss Charming's Book of Bar Amusements, published in 2000 because she had collected almost 1000 tricks. Since then, she has published a total of 16 books on cocktails, bar magic, and related subjects. Her most recent book (The Cocktail Companion) was released in November, 2019.

After the turn of the millennium, Charming went back to college to study graphic design, hosted seminars at the New Orleans–based Tales of the Cocktail Festival, and began working as a freelance mixologist and cocktail menu designer for Brown-Forman. While working on a book project, Cheryl needed to know when the first Cosmopolitan was mentioned on the television series, Sex and the City. Her Cosmopolitan research lasted many years and is documented on her website and in her 16th book.

In 2010 Charming moved to New Orleans and began working at the Bombay Club. In April 2013, she took over as bar director of the Bourbon "O” Bar in the Bourbon Orleans Hotel. Charming has been an early proponent of the craft cocktail movement, she set out to modernize her menu with contemporary seasonal cocktails, recipes for the Bourbon Street clientele, renovate the interior, and introduce a live jazz program. The Bourbon O Bar is the first "fresh" cocktail bar on Bourbon Street. Many of Charming's innovations and "bar hacks" have been widely recognized in cocktail culture and cocktail media.

In December 2014, Charming was named New Orleans Magazine's Mixologist of the Year in recognition of her work at the Bourbon "O”.

She has been called the "Martha Stewart of the cocktail world."
