= Cocktail garnish =

Decorative element added to a drink

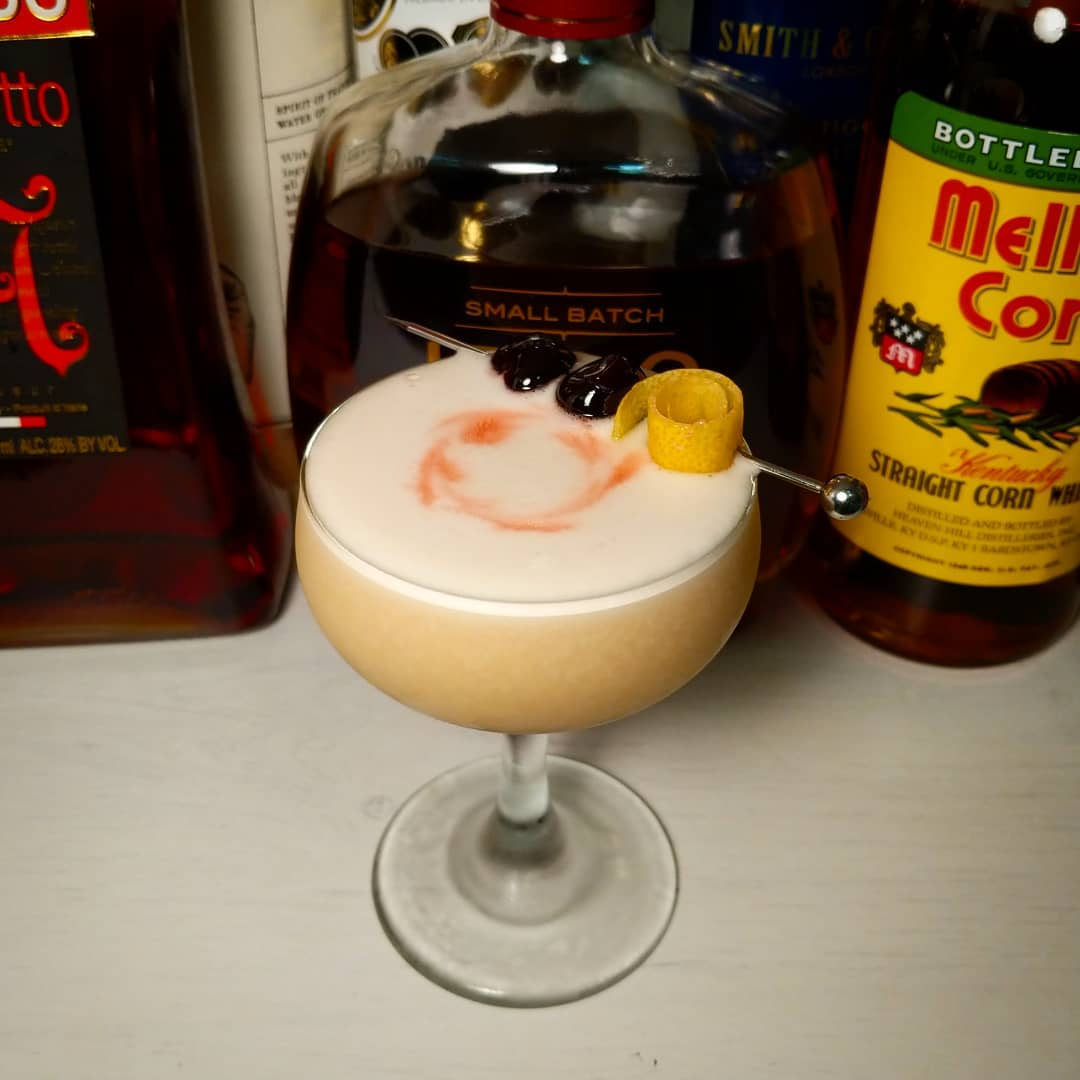
A whiskey sour, served in a coupe glass, is garnished with a spiral of lemon peel and two maraschino cherries on a cocktail pick, along with drops of bitters swirled into the foam (from egg white) atop the drink.

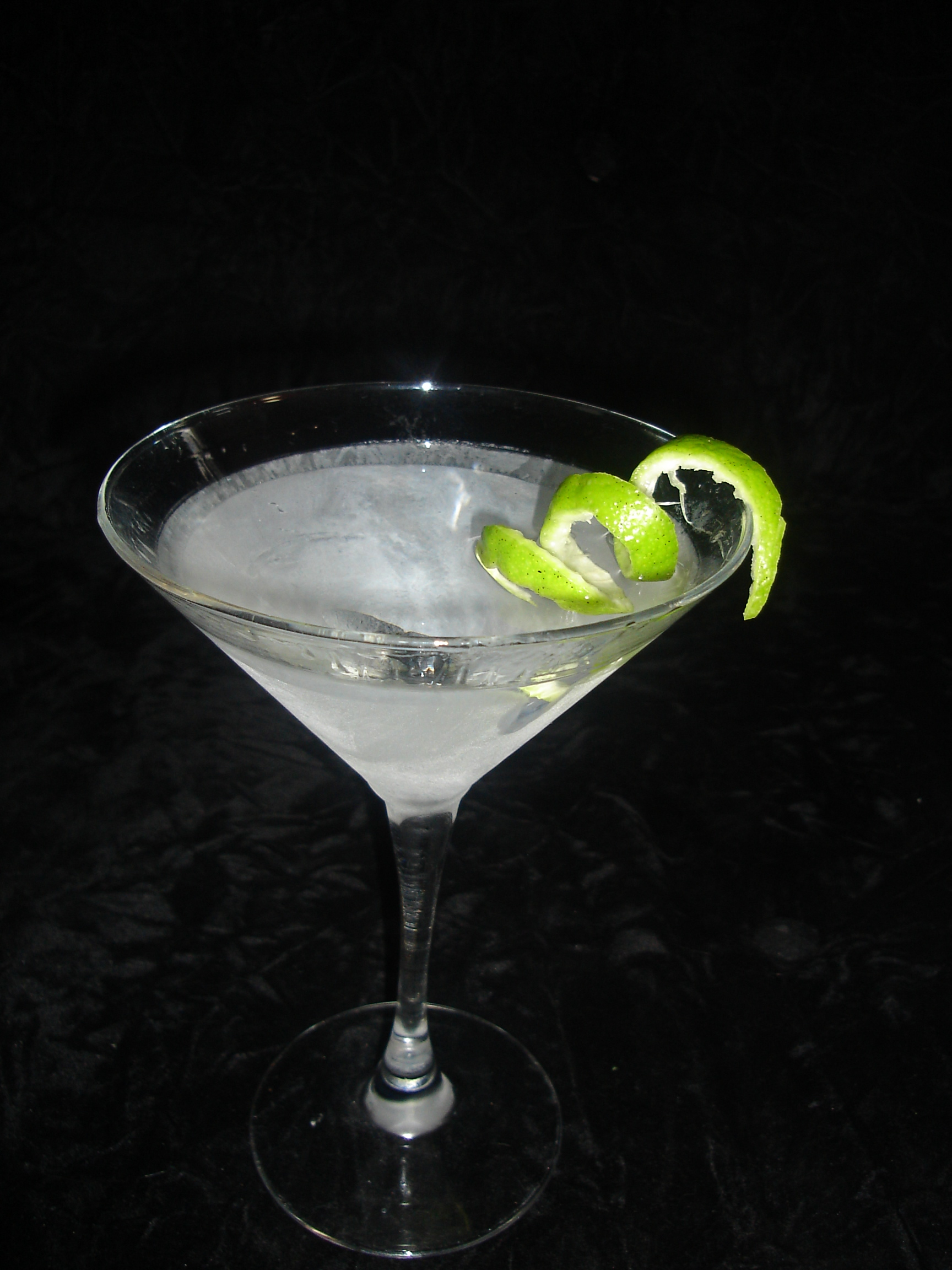
A lime peel "twist" for a garnish adds an elegant touch to this Martini

Cocktail garnishes are decorative ornaments that add character or style to a mixed drink, most notably to cocktails.

They are used to complement and enhance the flavors in a drink by stimulating the special nerve cells in the nose and mouth

A large variety of cocktail garnishes are used. Many rum-based cocktails, especially those with fruit flavors, tend to be decorated with tropical-themed garnishes or slices of fruit. Tequila-based drinks favor limes and other citrus fruits. Gin- and vodka-based drinks tend toward garnishes with a more dignified flair (olives, onions, or possibly a citrus twist or a single maraschino cherry), unless they are variations of a fruity rum-based drink. Whiskey- and brandy-based drinks tend toward minimal garnishment, if any. Restaurant chains and hotel bars tend to use larger and more ostentatious garnishes, and neighborhood bars tend to go the other extreme.

Some garnishes are essential to completing the recipe, as in the case of the olive in the Martini, the maraschino cherries in the Queen Mary and the Manhattan, or the onion in the Gibson. Another reason for garnishes is to make cocktails more "camera ready" so that when photos are taken for the press or social media, different drinks will not look so much alike.

== Common edible garnishes ==
Among common edible garnishes are the following:

- Bitters dashed onto the egg-white foam atop a shaken cocktail such as a whiskey sour.
- Candied ginger
- Carrot sticks
- Celery stalks (usually with leaves attached)
- Cinnamon, grated
- Cocktail olives (often stuffed with pimentos)
- Cocktail onions
- Flowers (commonly used Lilac flower)
- Lemon slice, twist, or wedge
- Lime slice, twist, or wedge
- Maraschino cherries
- Mint sprigs or leaves
- Nutmeg, grated
- Orange slice, twist, or wedge
- Pepper
- Pineapple slice or wedge
- Salt, coarse (applied to the rim of glasses)
- Shrimp
- Star anise
- Strawberries
- Sugar, granulated or powdered
- Watermelon wedge
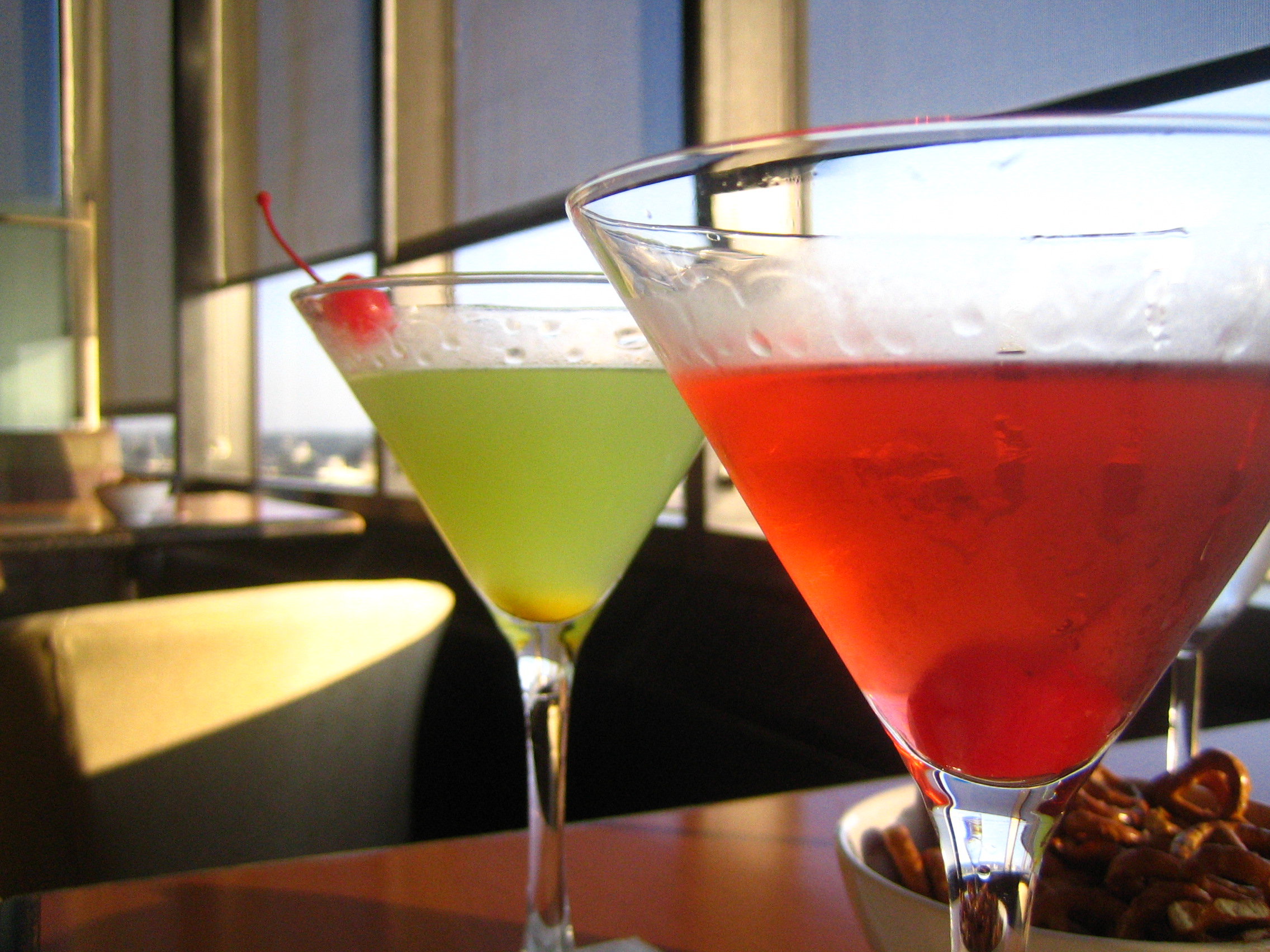
Maraschino cherry

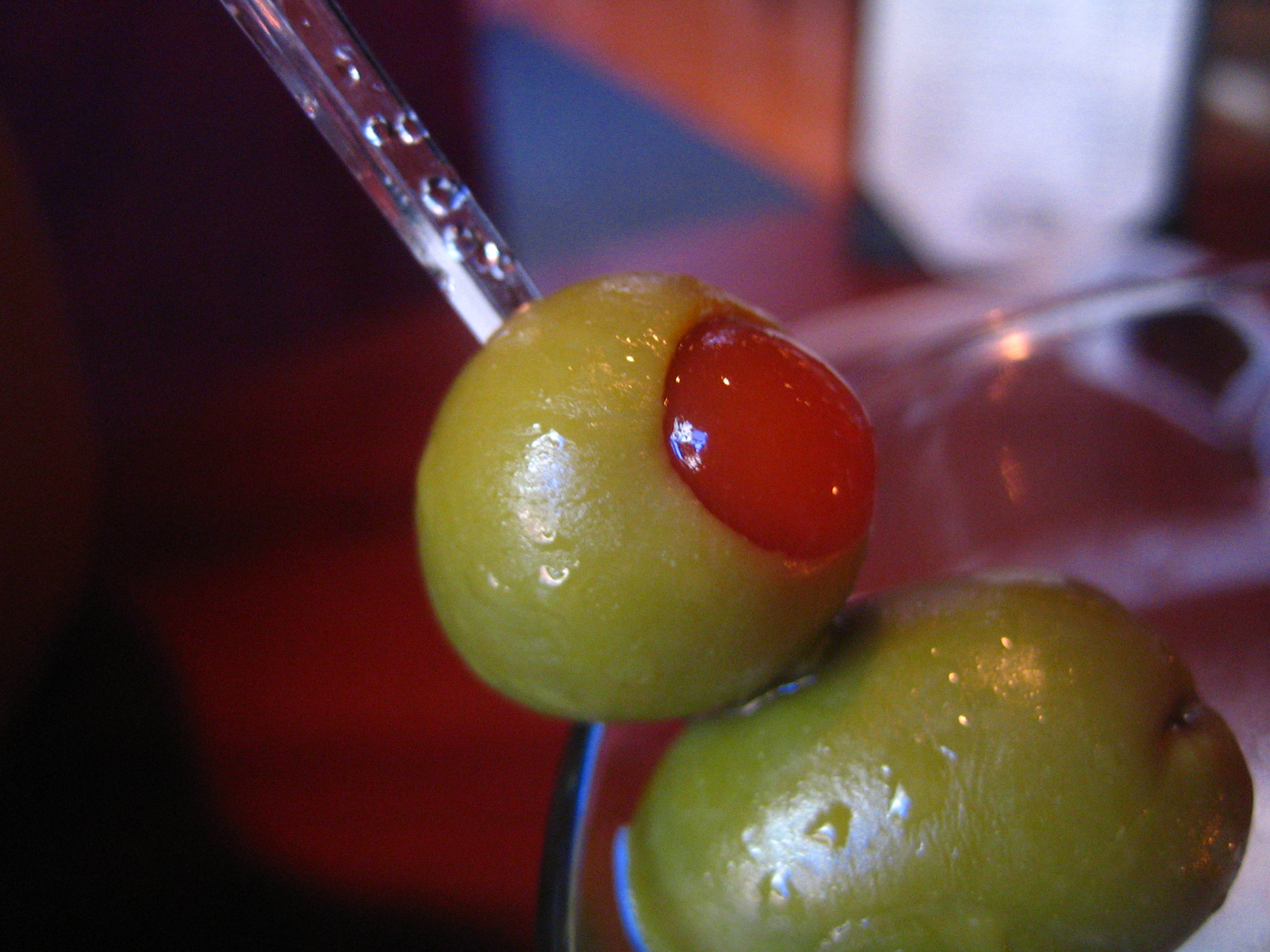
Cocktail olive

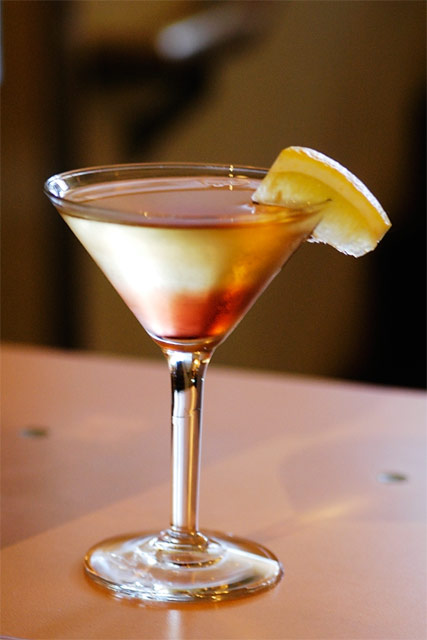
Lemon slice

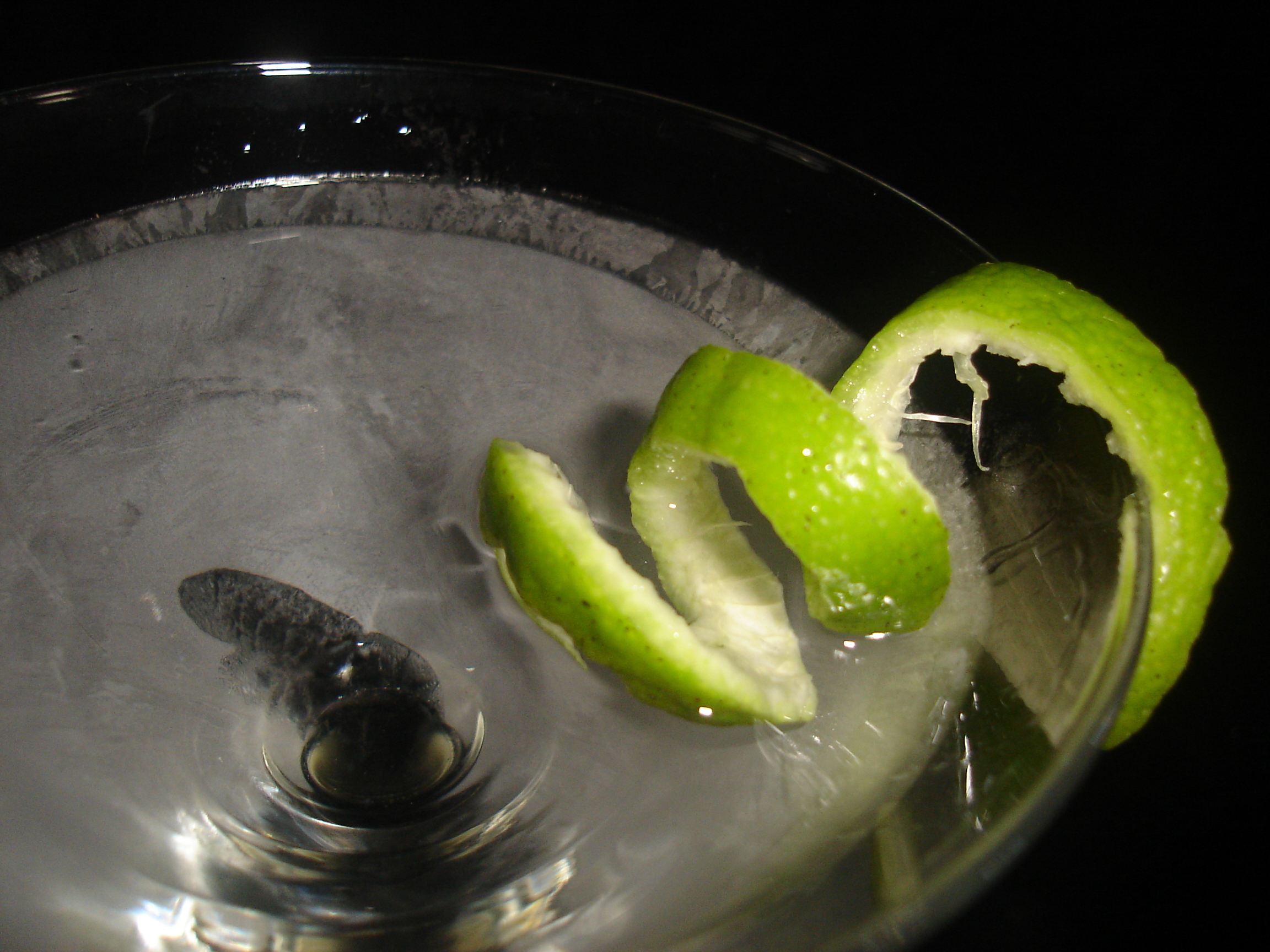
Lime twist

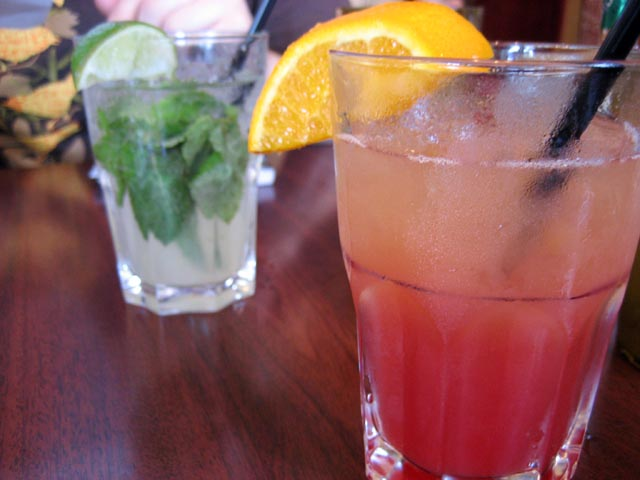
Orange, mint, and lime

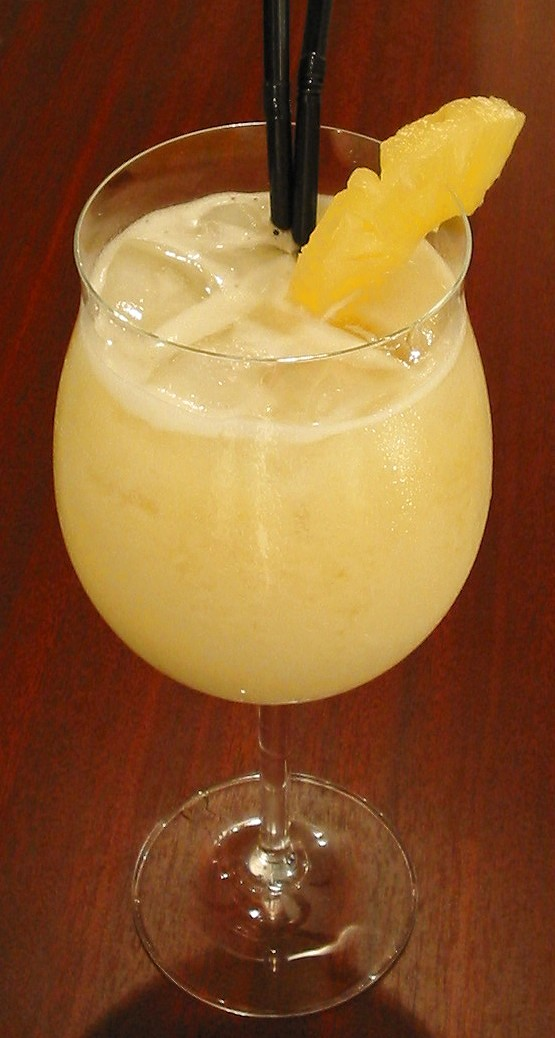
Pineapple wedge

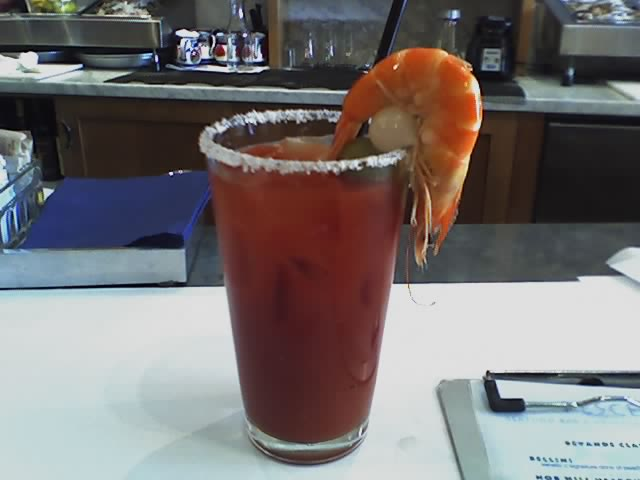
Shrimp

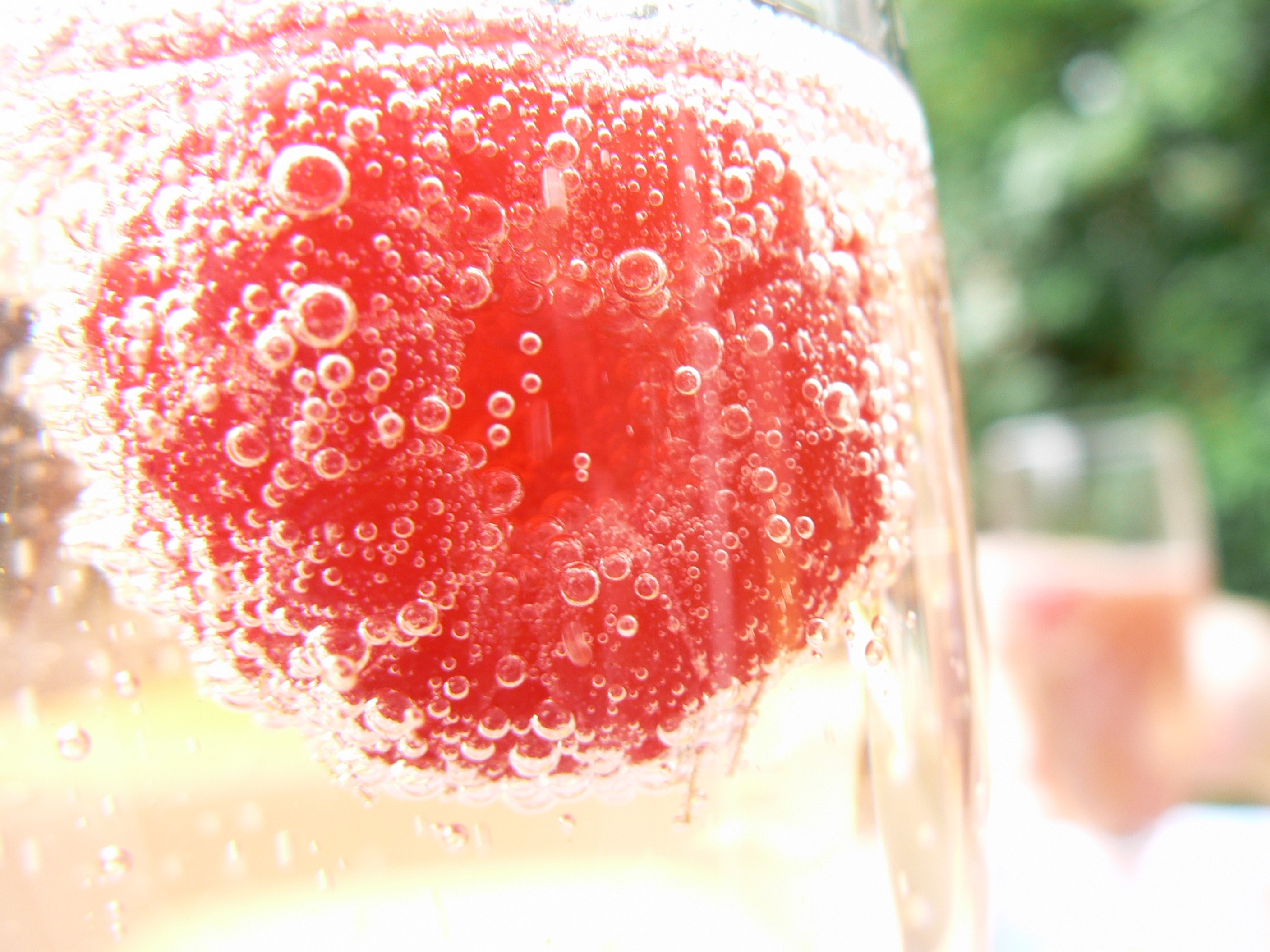
Raspberry

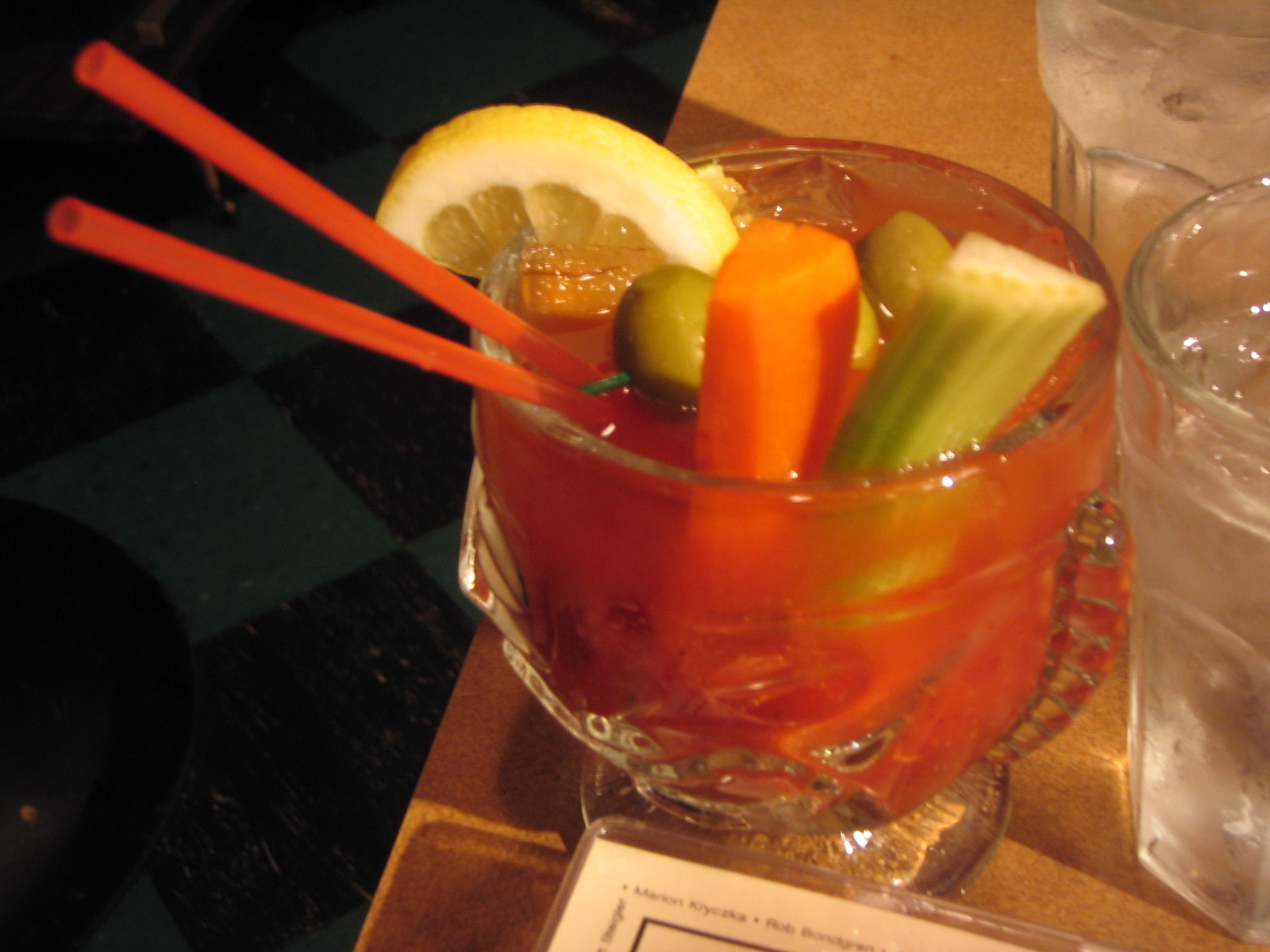
Carrot, celery, lemon, and olives

== Common inedible garnishes ==
These garnishes are purely for decoration or dramatic flair.

- Bead necklaces (especially common during Mardi Gras and Carnival)
- Candles
- Cocktail umbrellas
- Drinking straws (colorful or unusually shaped)
- Fire (see Flaming beverage)
- Flags
- Inedible flowers
- Plastic animals (attached to the rim of the glass)
- Plastic swords
- Sparklers
- Swizzle sticks
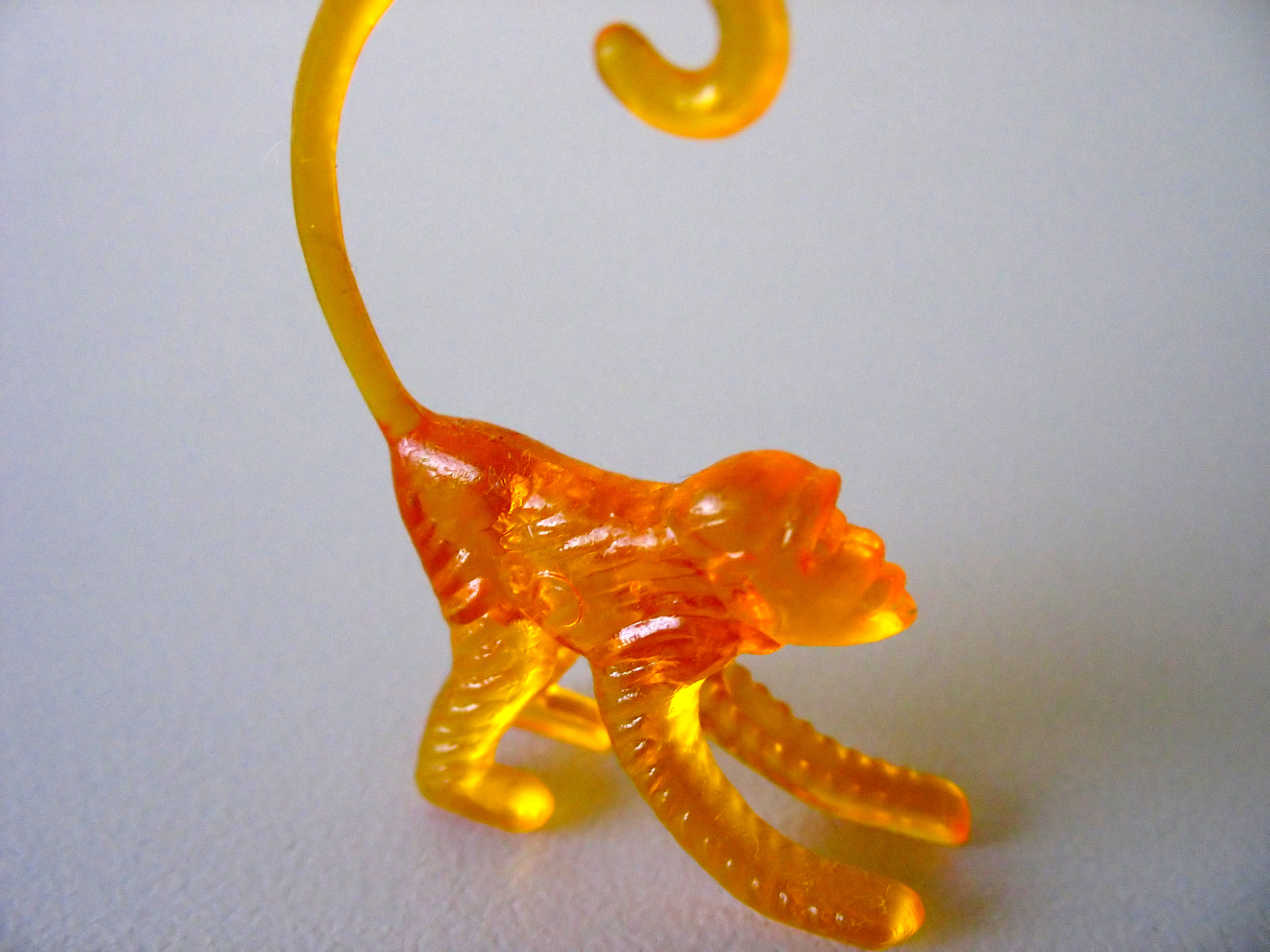
Cocktail monkey

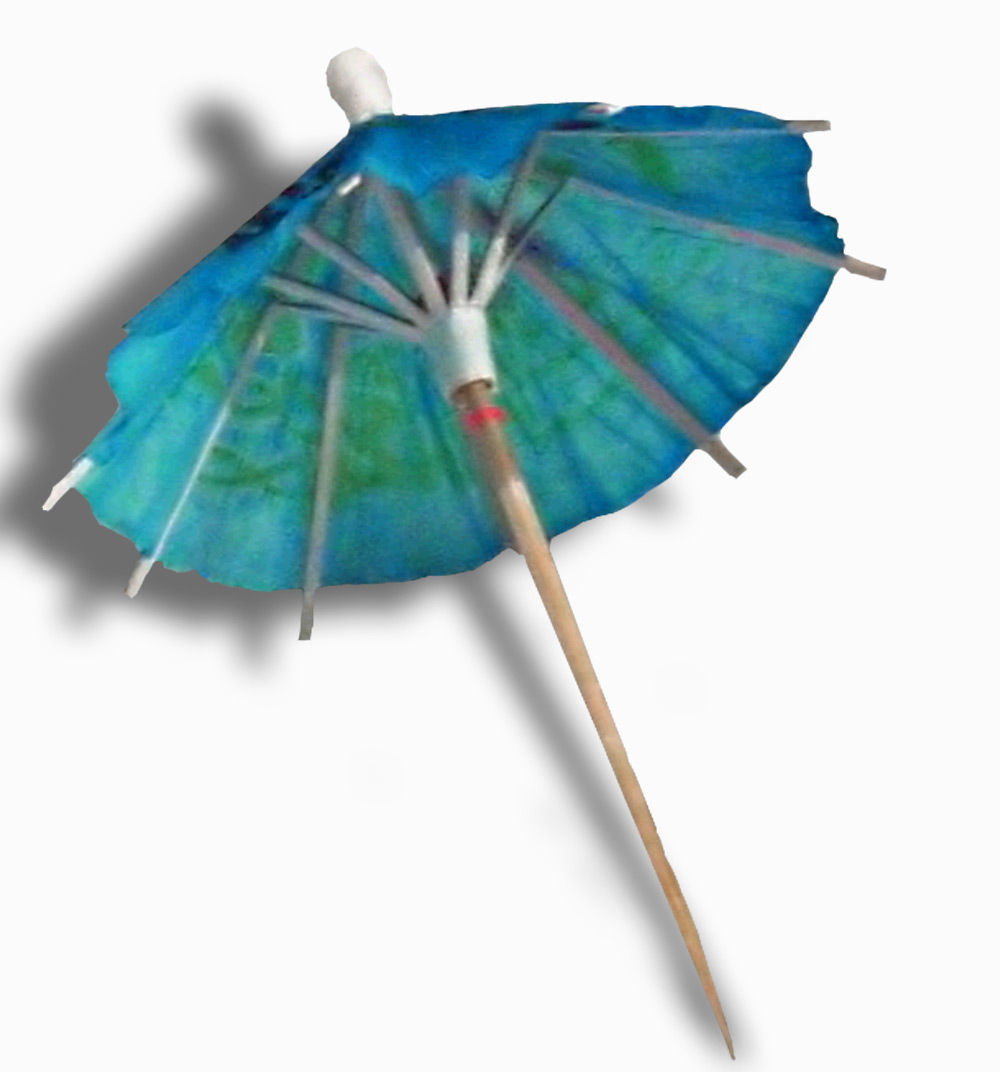
Cocktail umbrella

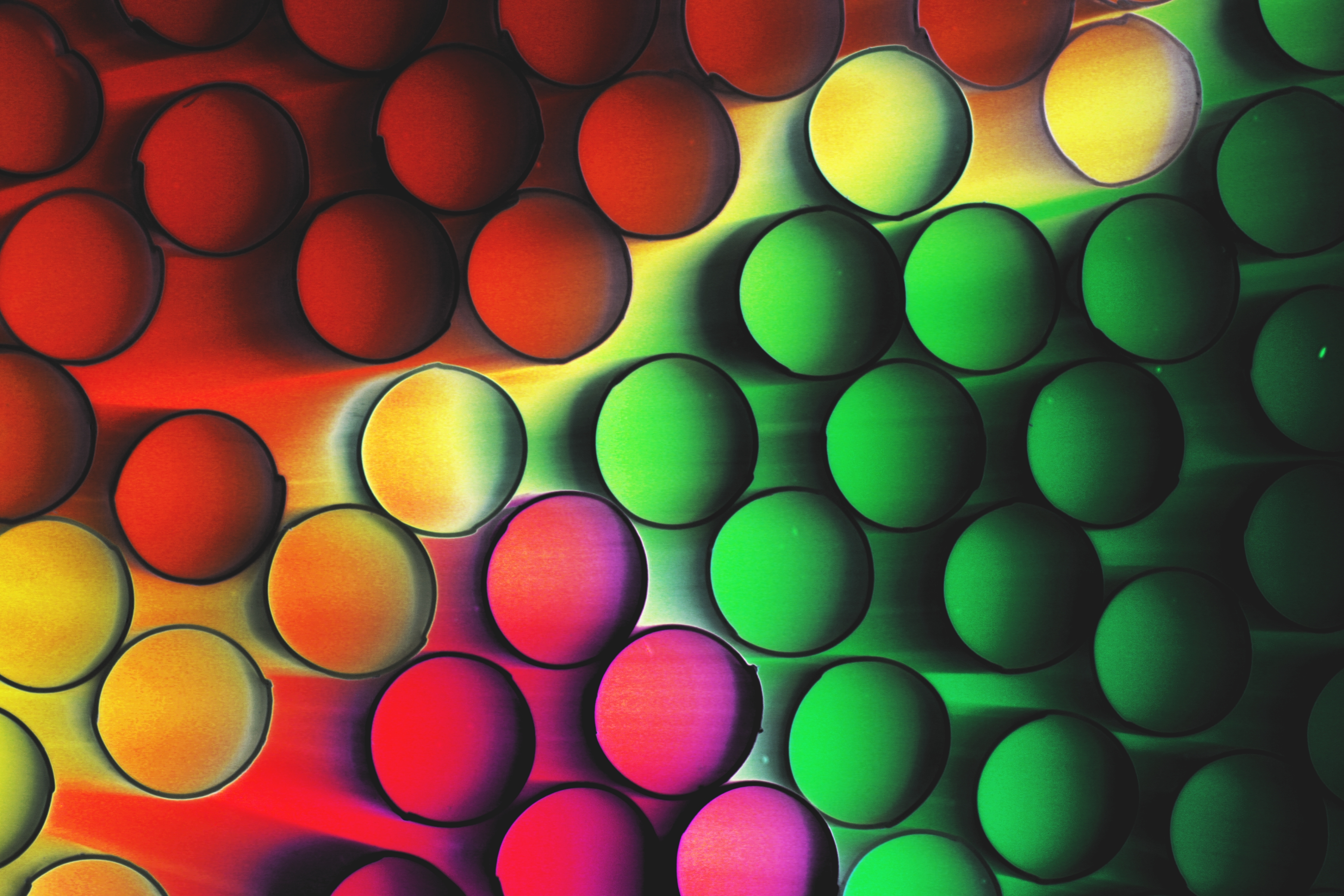
Drinking straws

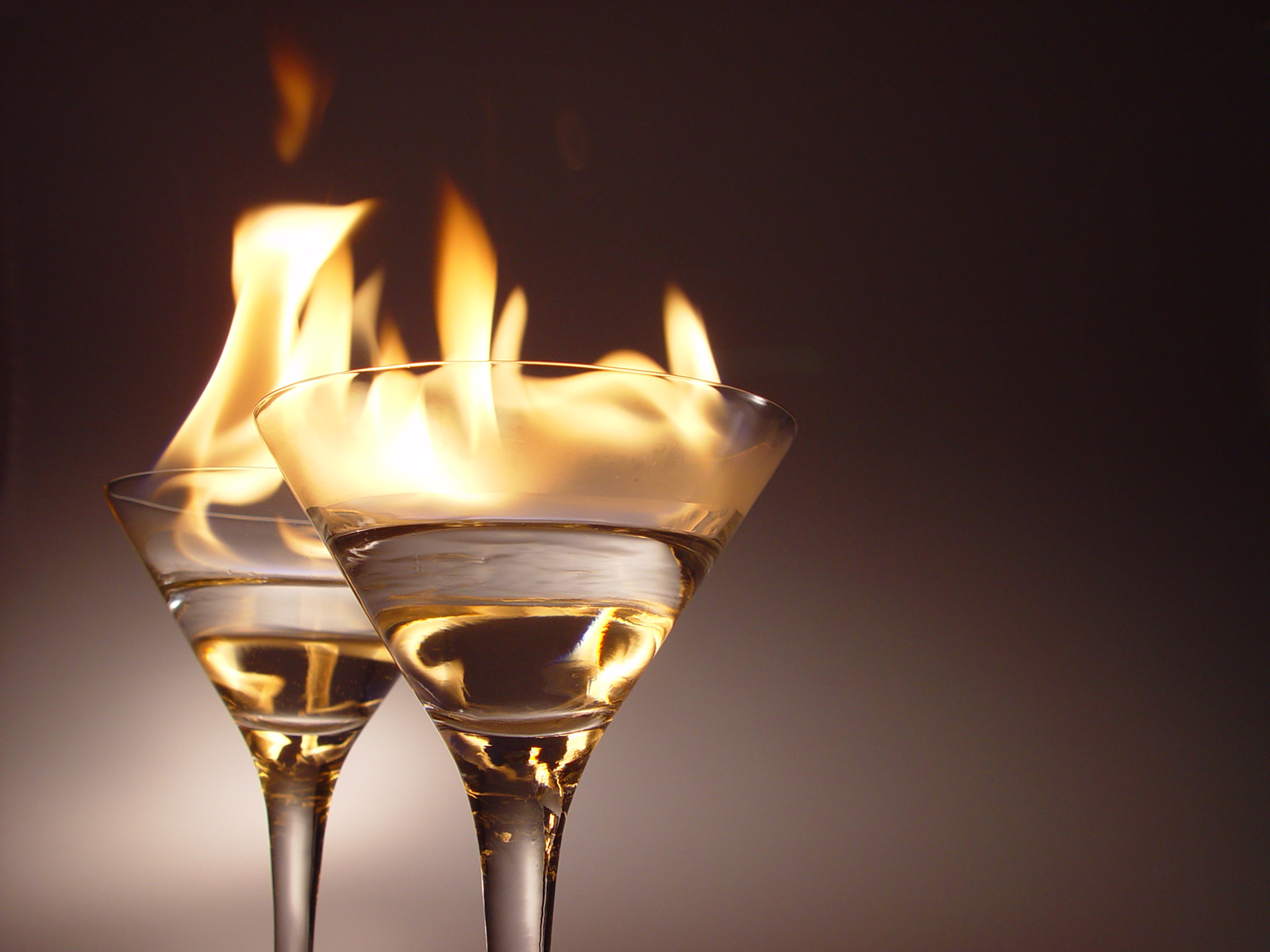
Fire

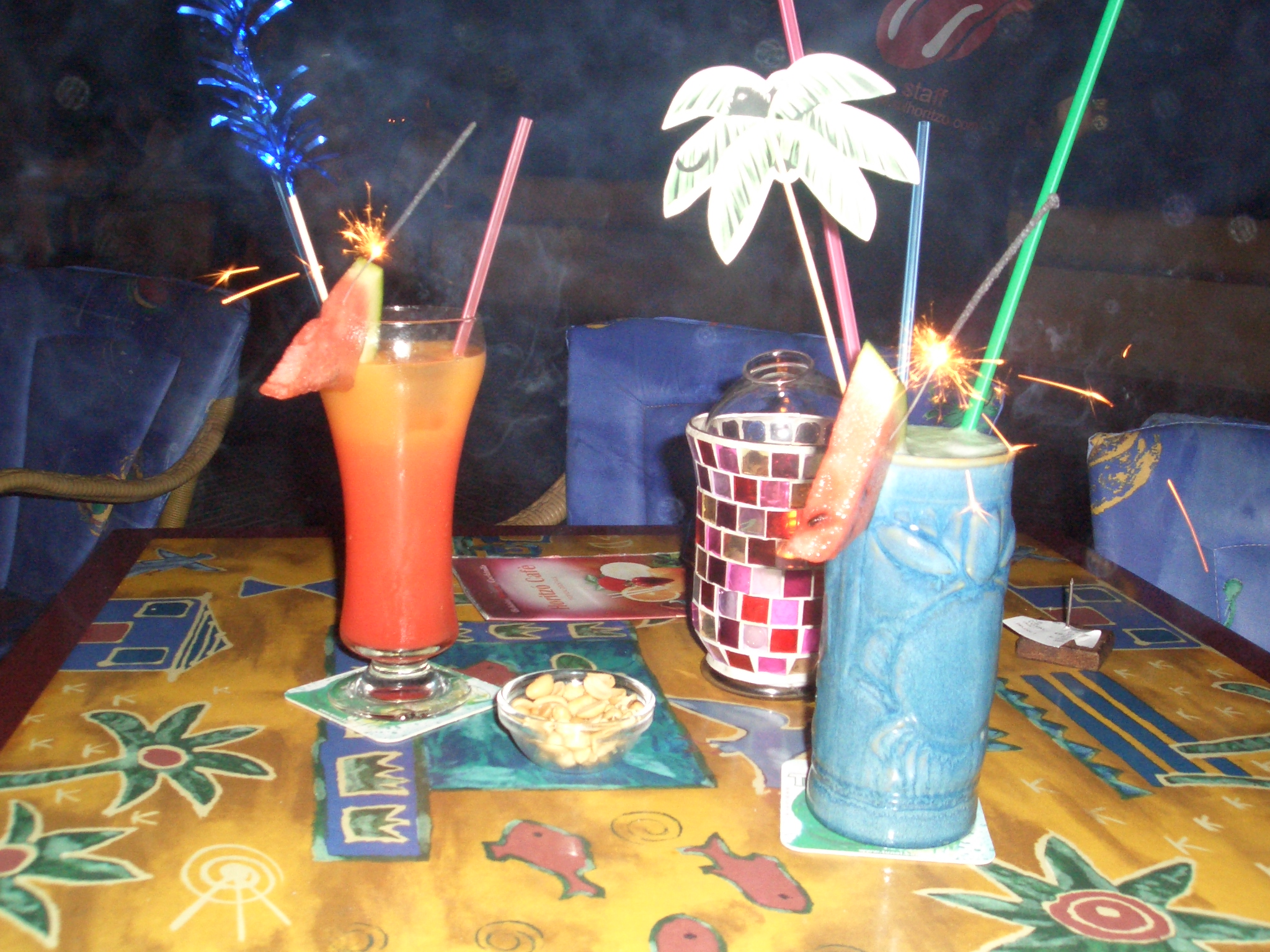
Sparklers, straws, watermelon and other decorations

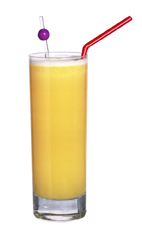
Swizzle stick and straw in a Collins glass

== See also ==
- Garnish
- Harry Yee
- List of cocktails
- Tiki bar
