= Gibson (cocktail) =

Gin and vermouth cocktail, often served with an onion

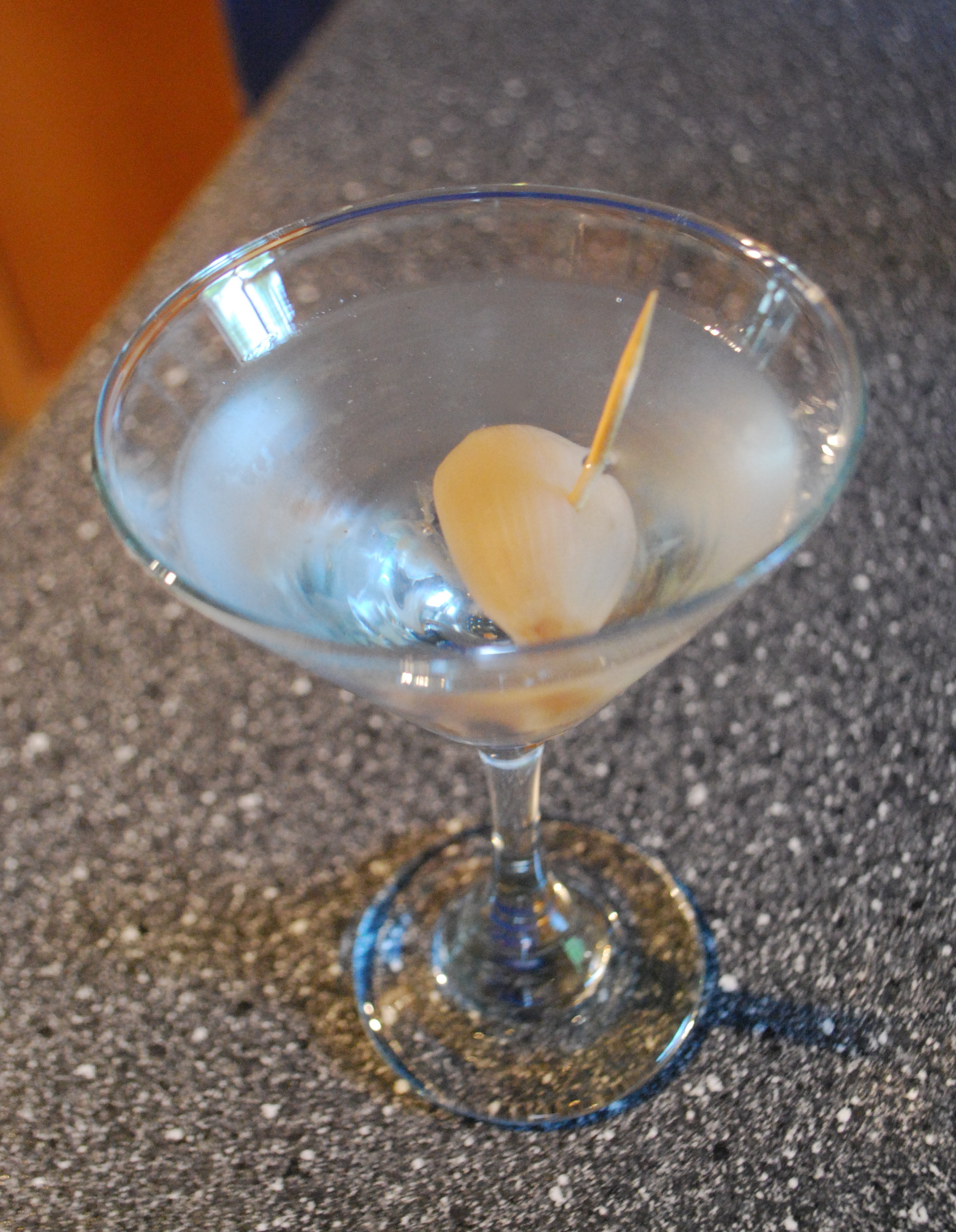
- Type: Cocktail
- Ingredients: 60 ml (2 US fl oz) (6 parts) gin; 10 ml (0.34 US fl oz) (1 part) dry vermouth
- Base spirit: Gin
- Standard drinkware: Cocktail glass
- Standard garnish: silverskin onion
- Served: Straight up: chilled, without ice
- Preparation: Stir well in a shaker with ice, then strain into a chilled martini glass. Garnish and serve

The Gibson is a mixed drink made with gin and dry vermouth, and often garnished with a pickled onion. In its modern incarnation, it is considered a cousin of the martini, distinguished mostly by garnishing with an onion instead of an olive.

== History ==
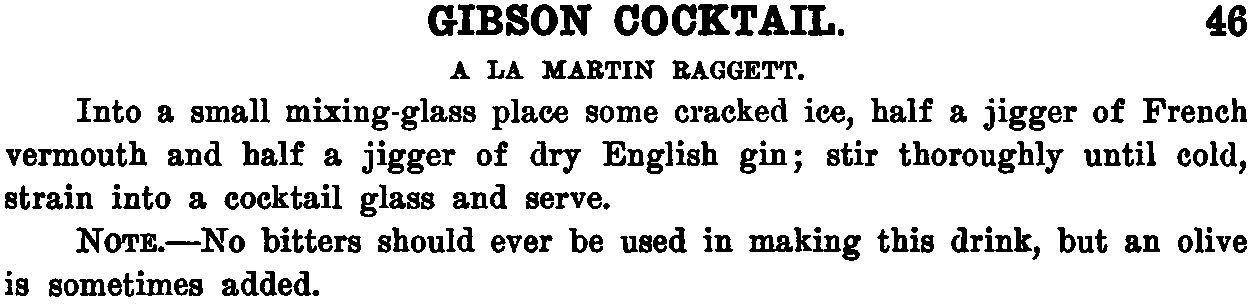
William Boothby's 1908 Gibson recipe

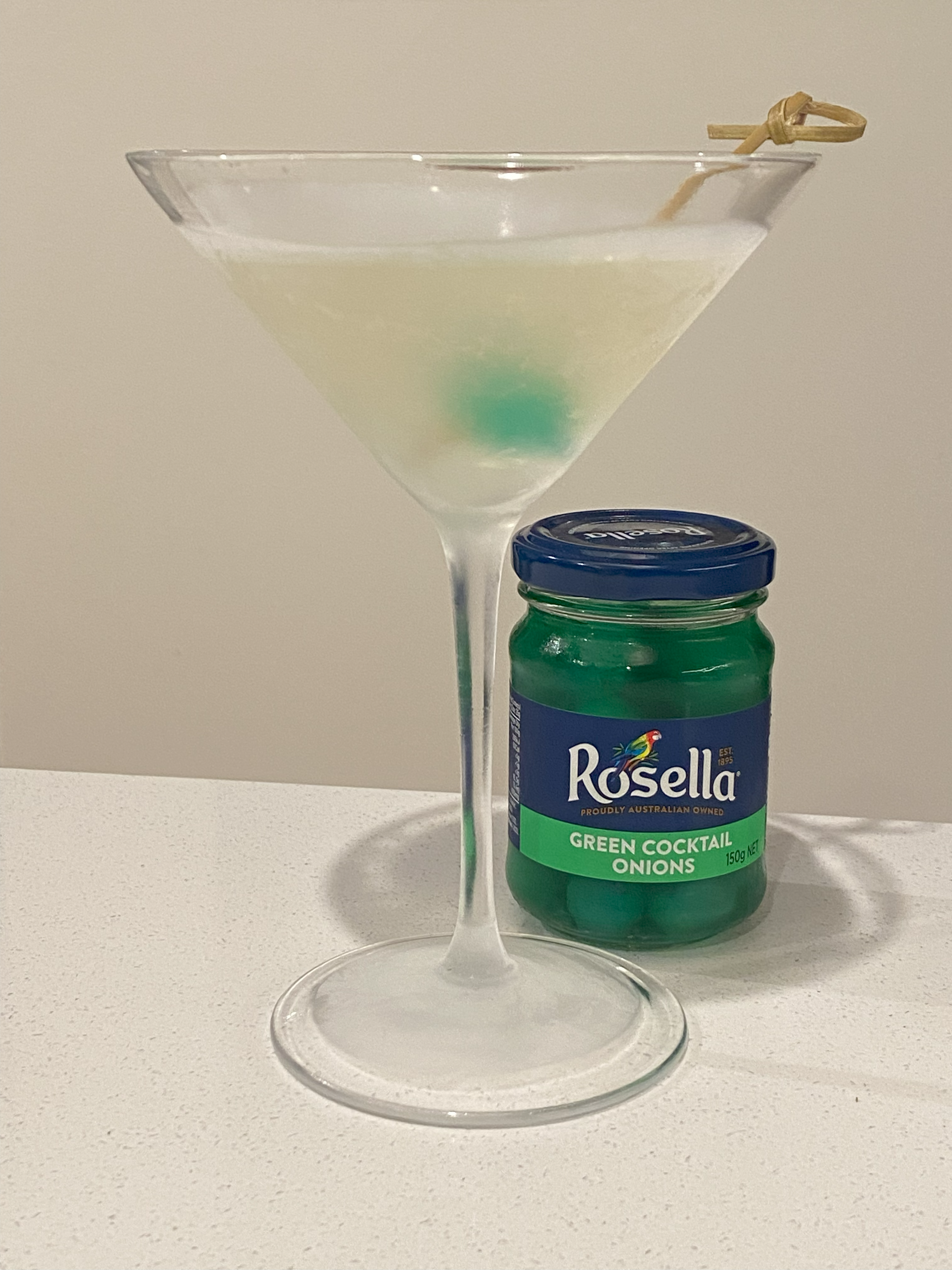
Gibson cocktail using green cocktail onion

The earliest recipes for a Gibson – including the first known recipe published in 1908 by William Boothby – are differentiated more by how they treat the addition of bitters.

Other pre-Prohibition recipes all omit bitters and none of them garnish with an onion. Some garnish with citrus twists. Others use no garnish at all. There is no known recipe for the Gibson garnished with an onion before William Boothby's 1908 Gibson recipe.

The exact origin of the Gibson is unclear, with numerous popular tales and theories about its genesis. According to one theory, it was invented in the early 20th century by Charles Dana Gibson, who created the popular Gibson Girl illustrations. Supposedly, he challenged Charley Connolly, the bartender of the Players Club in New York City, to improve upon a martini. As the story goes, Connolly simply substituted an onion for the olive and named the drink after the patron.

Another version now considered more probable recounts a 1968 interview with a relative of a prominent San Francisco businessman named Walter D. K. Gibson, who claimed to have created the drink at the Bohemian Club in the 1890s. Charles Clegg, when asked about it by Herb Caen, also said it was from San Francisco, not New York. Other reporting supports this theory: Edward Townsend, former vice president of the Bohemian Club, is credited with the first mention of the Gibson in print, in a humorous essay he wrote for the New York World published in 1898.

== See also ==
- List of cocktails
