= Twist (cocktail garnish) =

Citrus zest garnishing a cocktail

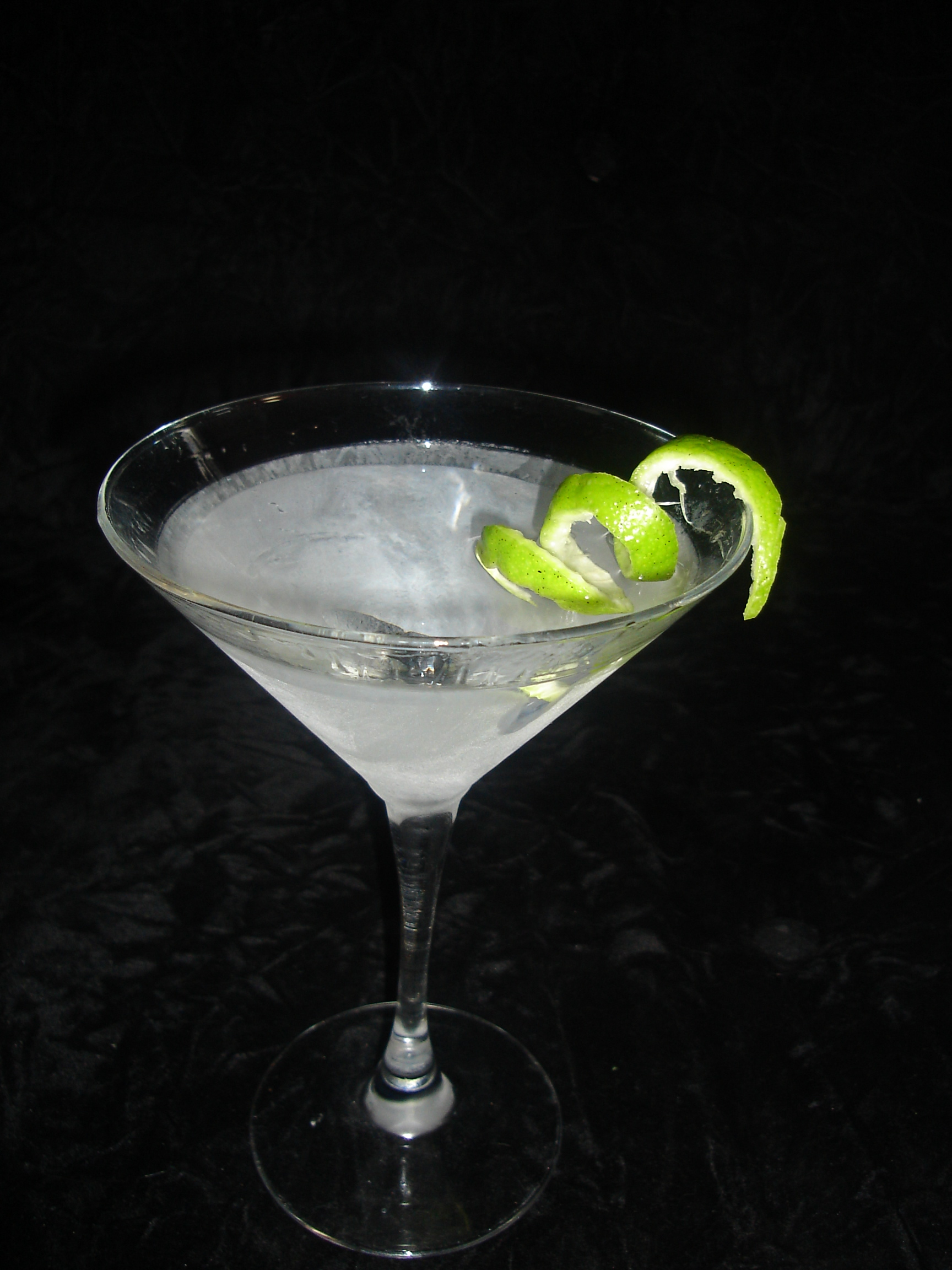
- Gin martini with a lime twist
- Type: Cocktail garnish

A twist is a piece of citrus zest used as a cocktail garnish, generally for decoration and to add flavor when added to a mixed drink.

There are a variety of ways of making and using twists. Twists are typically cut from a whole fresh citrus fruit with a small kitchen knife immediately prior to serving, although a peeler, citrus zesters, or other utensil may be used. A curled shape may come from cutting the wedge into a spiral, winding it around a straw or other object, or as a byproduct of the cutting.

The name may refer to the shape of the garnish, which is typically curled or twisted longitudinally, or else to the act of twisting the garnish to release fruit oils that infuse the drink. Other techniques include running the twist along the rim of the glass, and "flaming" the twist.

They are generally about 50 mm (2 inches) long (although length varies), and thin.

Cocktails featuring a twist include Horse's Neck. A lemon twist is also an optional garnish for the martini, and an orange twist is traditional for the old fashioned.
