= Saketini =

Cocktail that uses sake

The saketini is a cocktail that uses sake as its base, along with other ingredients such as simple syrups, distilled spirits, liqueurs, juices and garnishes. The name saketini is a portmanteau of "sake" and "martini", a cocktail traditionally made from gin and vermouth.

It is not a true martini, but is one of many drinks that incorporate the term martini into their names.

== History ==
The 2015 work "The Cocktail Detective" attributes the drink's invention to the chef Matsuda, in Queens during the 1964 World's Fair, and only later reviving it in the 1990s.

Preceding the resurgence in popularity of the martini in the early 2000s, people began using sake as a mixer in cocktails, simultaneous with a larger broadening of the term "martini" to include a wide variety of cocktails. Some cocktail purists feel the saketini is an insult to the integrity of the classic gin-vermouth cocktail. Others, such as mixologist Lucy Brennan, approve of the saketini and have adapted and concocted many sake-based cocktail recipes. Hiroaki Aoki, the founder of Benihana restaurants, says in the 2003 book Sake: Water From Heaven: "if a cocktail made with sake is pleasing to the palate, why should tradition stand in the way of progress?"

== See also ==
- Sake bomb
- Tamagozake
