= Brandy sour (disambiguation) =

A Brandy Sour is a mixed alcoholic cocktail made using brandy and citrus juice, commonly lemon, closely related to other sour cocktails. There are several varieties of Brandy Sour:

- A Brandy Daisy – Made using fresh lemon juice, commonly associated with the term Brandy Sour in many parts of the world
- A Sidecar (cocktail) - A cocktail commonly classified as a sour with brandy as the primary alcohol by volume
- Brandy Sour (Cyprus) – Developed on the Mediterranean island of Cyprus, and made using local brandy and lemon cordial.
