= Rickey (cocktail) =

Highball drink made from gin or bourbon

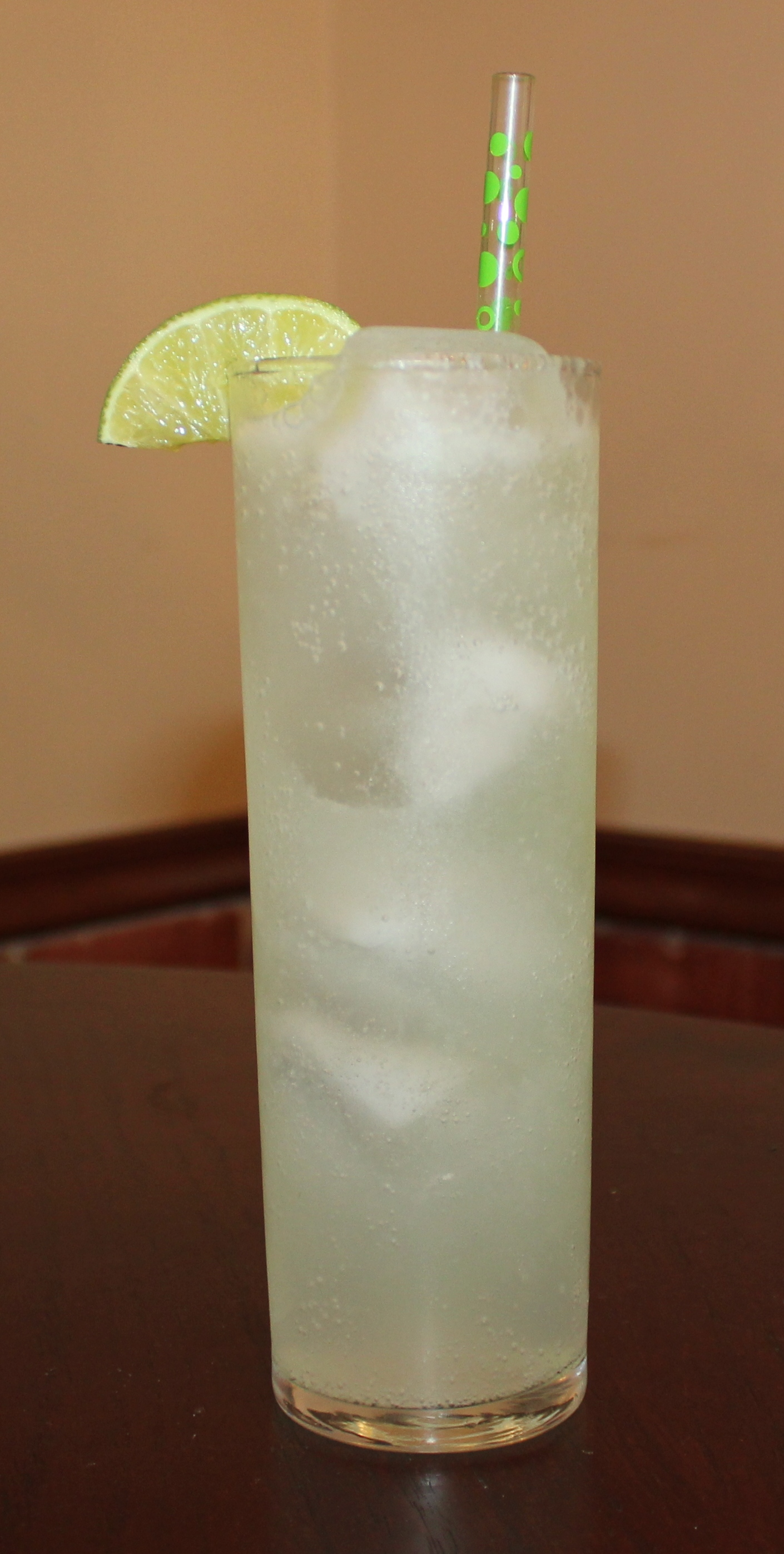
- Gin rickey
- Type: Cocktail
- Ingredients: 2 oz bourbon, rye whiskey, or gin; Half of a lime squeezed and dropped in the glass; Sparkling mineral water
- Base spirit: Gin, bourbon whiskey, rye whiskey
- Standard drinkware: Highball glass
- Standard garnish: lime half shell
- Served: On the rocks: poured over ice
- Preparation: Combine spirit, lime, and shell in a highball or wine glass. Add ice, stir and then add sparkling mineral water.

The rickey is a highball made from gin or bourbon, lime juice, and carbonated water. Little or no sugar is added to the rickey. It was created with bourbon in Washington, D.C., at Shoomaker's bar by bartender George A. Williamson in the 1880s, purportedly in collaboration with Democratic lobbyist Colonel Joe Rickey. Its popularity increased when made with gin a decade later. A non-alcoholic version is a lime rickey.

A recipe for the rickey appeared as early as 1903 in Daly's Bartenders' Encyclopedia by Tim Daly (p. 57):

GIN RICKEY. Use a sour glass. Squeeze the juice of one lime into it. One small lump of ice. One wine glass of Plymouth gin. Fill the glass with syphon seltzer, and serve with a small bar spoon.

== History ==
=== Colonel Joe Rickey ===
In 1883, Colonel Joe Rickey was purported to have invented the "Joe Rickey," after a bartender at Shoomaker's in Washington, D.C., added lime to his "mornin's morning," a daily dose of Bourbon with lump ice and Apollinaris sparkling mineral water. Some stories place the exact day as a Monday after Col. Joe Rickey celebrated his wager with a Philadelphian on the successful ascension of John G. Carlisle to Speaker of the House. Col. Joe Rickey was known as a "gentleman gambler" and placed many bets on the outcome of various political contests.

The American almanac, year-book, encyclopedia, and atlas: Volume 2 – Page 748 in 1903 "Rickey, Colonel Joseph Karr. at New York City, aged 61 years. Confederate veteran of the civil war; originator of the drink which bears his name April. 24."

Two days later, this was published:

The St. Louis Republic. (St. Louis, Mo.) April 26, 1903, PART IV

Washington. April S. The tragic death of Colonel Joe Rickey in New York was heard in Washington with much sorrow, for Colonel Rickey was well known at the national capital and many friends here. His death naturally recalls to Washington the famous drink which bears his name, although it was first concocted in the city 23 ago. Colonel Rickey had indulged not too wisely but too often and happened to stray into Shoemakers. George Williamson behind the polished bar. Asked for a bracer. Williamson placed a large-sized goblet before the Colonel and placed therein a chunk of Ice. Colonel Rickey looked at the Ice for a while and then said: some bourbon and fill it up with seltzer from a siphon.

The next day, Colonel Hatch, seeing a bowl of limes on the counter, said, "Say, Joe, why don't you try a lime in that stuff?" Colonel Rickey liked the suggestion, and Williamson squeezed a half lime In each glass before putting in the bourbon and seltzer.

Only one thing did he ever make clear to his real political convictions: that he was not a civil service reformer.

The name is also attributed to Rep. William Henry Hatch and Fred Mussey, who were said to be present when the drink was created and later came in asking for a "Joe Rickey drink" or "I'll have a Joe Rickey."

However, assigning credit for the name's provenance is complicated, as an edition of the Saint Paul Globe from June 17, 1900, claimed to have overheard Joe Rickey at the Waldorf-Astoria argue he never actually drank rickeys but enjoyed bourbon, carbonated water, and lemon. In the same account, Col. Joe Rickey ascribes the addition of lime to the bartenders at Shoomaker's. There are numerous other articles that describe Col. Joe Rickey's unhappiness with being ascribed authorship:

Some people are born to fame; others achieve it, while celebrity is thrust upon a few. Among the latter is Col. Joe Rickey of Missouri. But instead of feeling proud that he has given his name to a popular tipple, Col. Rickey feels very much aggrieved. "Only a few years ago," he said recently, "I was Col. Rickey of Missouri, the friend of senators, judges, and statesmen and something of an authority on political matters and political movements. ... But am I ever spoken of for those reasons? I fear not. No, I am known to fame as the author of the 'rickey,' and I have to be satisfied with that. There is one consolation in the fact that there are fashions in drinks. The present popularity of the Scotch high ball may possibly lose me my reputation and restore me my former fame. 'Tis a consummation devoutly to be wished for.'"

=== Shoomaker's resort ===
Shoomaker's was a well-known "resort" or bar, opened in 1858 by Captain Robert Otto "Charley" Hertzog and Major William Shoomaker and located at 1331 E Street near the National Theatre. Both men were German immigrants who served as officers in the Union Army in the Civil War and anglicized their names. After the two men died, Colonel Joseph "Joe" K. Rickey, a Democratic lobbyist from Missouri, bought Shoomaker's in 1883. The bar later moved in 1914 to 1311 E Street (the Library of Congress has a 1916 or 1917 photo of this location in its online archive). The stretch of E Street between the Willard Hotel and 13th street was known as "Rum Row."

Around the corner on 14th Street was "Newspaper Row," where many of the national newspapers had their Washington bureaus between E and F Streets. The original Washington Post building from 1893 was on E Street, right in the center of Rum Row, as was the Munsey Building, home to The Washington Times. Newspaper Row and Rum Row formed a symbiotic relationship: lobbyists and politicians would drink and entertain at their favorite bars, interacting with reporters who could walk around the corner to their bureau and file a story. This system ended when the Sheppard Act closed all saloons in the District on November 1, 1917—more than two years before national Prohibition began. The newspaper bureaux have long since been razed; the only reminder from Newspaper Row's glory days is the National Press Building.

Famous writers, politicians, and political types were frequent guests at Shoomaker's, including some of the "greatest men in the country." Elbert Hubbard wrote about the clientele of Shoomaker's and the convivial nature of the place:

The men who come here mostly live in palaces. They are rich and powerful. They bear big burdens. Here they relax and are free from the vigils of butlers, wives, daughters, or decent neighbors. It is democracy carried to the limit. ... Here, men get freedom from the tyranny of things. Nothing matters. The bartenders are your neighbors, the proprietor your long-familiar friend, and the patrons your partners.

Shoomaker's was well known for its whiskey and wine quality, prompting Judge Cowan of Texas during an investigation by the Congressional Agricultural Committee to declare Shoomaker's "as the place where the best whiskey in Washington is to be had." Shoomaker's also distributed spirits and wine and had their own rye whiskey, commonly used in the whiskey versions of the Rickey.

Shoomaker's lack of decor was infamous. It had two nicknames: "Shoo's" and "Cobweb Hall"—the latter because it was never dusted of cobwebs at its first location. The dingy look was much revered by its customers.

October 31, 1917, was the last wet day in the District—the Sheppard Act went into effect the next day. It is reported that Shoomaker's closed at 10 p.m. on October 31 when they ran out of liquor. The guests are purported to have sung a popular song at the time, "Over There." Shoomaker's reopened not as a saloon but as a place serving soft drinks, but the public was not interested. It, too, closed in March 1918.

=== George A. Williamson ===
Col. Joe Rickey was a shareholder in Shoomaker's and later purchased it outright when Major Shoomaker died in 1883. He installed Augustus "Gus" Noack and George A. Williamson as its president and secretary, respectively. Williamson was also a bartender and revered for his convivial nature and political astuteness. A 1915 obituary in the Washington Evening Star claimed, "Many a great question of national politics has been thrashed out, if not settled, in [Williamson's] presence and himself participating in the discussion."

Williamson was also known as the "King of Juleps" according to The Washington Post and called "...the most celebrated of [Shoomaker's bartenders]", according to a reminiscence of Joe Crowley, former president of Washington, D.C.'s Bartender's Union prior to Prohibition.

George Rothwell Brown placed Williamson as the rickey's inventor in his 1930 book, Washington: A Not Too Serious History. Brown suggested that an unknown stranger discussed with Williamson how drinks were prepared in the Caribbean with half of a lime, gave Williamson some limes, and asked him to substitute rye whiskey for rum. The following morning Williamson was said to have made one for Col. Rickey, who approved.

=== The gin rickey ===
By the 1890s, the gin rickey had supplanted the early bourbon version now known as the "Joe Rickey." George Rothwell Brown ascribed the creation of the gin rickey to the Chicago exposition of 1893, where the jinrikisha, or rickshaw, was introduced from Japan. It became a joke among travelers.

The joke appears in 1891 in the Omaha Daily Bee, originating from the Washington Star:

The first thing a toper asks for in Japan is a gin-ricksha.

By 1907, the gin rickey was of such import that an article from the Los Angeles Herald titled "Limes are on Time" stated:

Now let the warm weather come and let the siphons hiss because the limes are here, ready for the gin rickeys. Three hundred cases of rickeys, or to be more explicit, 2,000,000 junior lemons — for, to be sure, they lacked the carbonic water and gin — arrived today from the West Indies on the steamship Pretoria.

However, by the 1900s, some newspapers were already noting that the scotch highball and the Mamie Taylor were overtaking the popularity of the gin rickey.

Many variations of the gin rickey exist, such as the strawberry lime gin rickey, which includes gin, strawberries, lime juice, honey, mint leaves, club soda, and sugar.

== In popular culture ==
The gin rickey appears in Chapter 7 of F. Scott Fitzgerald's 1925 classic The Great Gatsby. The scene begins on a day that is "broiling, almost the last, certainly the warmest, of the summer." The narrator, Nick Carraway, describes Tom returning "preceding four gin rickeys that clicked full of ice. Gatsby took up his drink. 'They certainly look cool,' [Gatsby] said with visible tension. We drank in long, greedy swallows."

The Glenn Miller Orchestra recorded the song "Jukebox Saturday Night" (words by Albert Stillman) in which a nonalcoholic version of the drink is featured (recorded by the Glenn Miller Orchestra on July 15, 1942, with Marion Hutton and the Modernaires):

Mopping up sodapop rickeys
To our heart's delight
Dancing to swingeroo quickies
Jukebox Saturday night

In The Simpsons episode "Burns, Baby Burns," Mr. Burns is drinking a rickey when introduced to his illegitimate son Larry. Not realizing Larry is his son, he expostulates, "How dare you interrupt my lime rickey!"

Dr. Jason Wilkes ordered a gin rickey in the Agent Carter episode "A View in the Dark".

A teenage JFK asks, "Any chance I can sneak a gin rickey?" in Season 2, Episode 5 of Timeless.

In Our Flag Means Death, set in the Golden Age of Piracy, a character named Prince Ricky claims to have invented the drink.

In Palm Royale, Robert the pool boy drinks a gin rickey in a nod to the actor who portrays him, Ricky Martin.

In 1923 (TV series), Jack Dutton orders a gin rickey from an underground speakeasy.

In The Sopranos episode Walk Like a Man, Tony teases Chris by implying that while Chris is teetotaling he drinks Lime Rickeys.

=== D.C. Craft Bartenders Guild ===
The D.C. Craft Bartenders Guild, an independent guild of bartenders in the District, designated July as Rickey Month and has since held annual competitions to celebrate the District's native cocktail by inviting local bartenders to compete. In 2011, the Rickey was declared the District's official native cocktail, and the month of July was declared Rickey Month in D.C.

== Variations and similar cocktails ==
The Sheeney Rickey is a version of the gin rickey without adding the lime shell, according to The Life and Times of Henry Thomas, Mixologist. Thomas was a noted bartender from Washington, D.C., who worked at Shoomaker's and whose book was privately published in 1926 and 1929.

In contemporary times, Arizona Beverage Company produces a non-alcoholic, highly sweetened version of the Rickey in cherry & apple flavors. Despite the secondary flavors present, lime is still quite prominent in both the marketing on the package as well as the taste. Even though Arizona beverages are largely non-carbonated, their Rickey is fizzy like the cocktail.

Ranch water (also called Texas Ranch Water) is also a variation to the Rickey. It is a cocktail typically made with tequila, lime juice, and Topo Chico sparkling mineral water. It originates in Texas, often traced to an Austin restaurant that opened in 1998.

== See also ==
- List of cocktails
