= Juyoung Kang =

American bartender (born 1979)

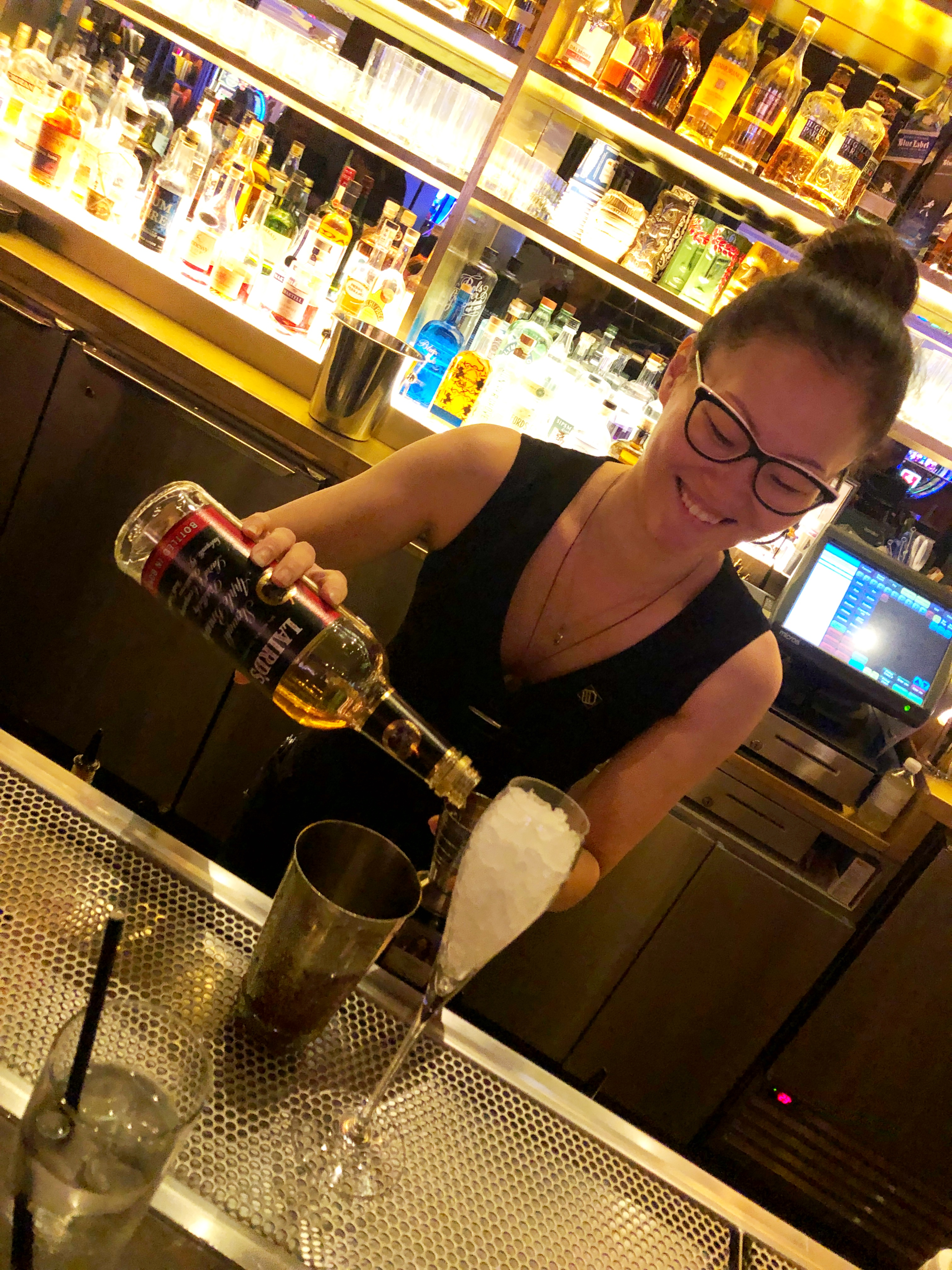
- Juyoung Kang bartending at the Dorsey in 2019.
- Born: 1979 (age 45–46); Philadelphia, Pennsylvania, United States
- Occupation: Bartender

Juyoung Kang is an American bartender. Kang serves as the head bartender at The Dorsey at The Venetian in Las Vegas, Nevada in the United States. Her work has been featured on KNPR and in The Atlantic, GQ, Food & Wine, Men's Health, Forbes Las Vegas Weekly and Eater. Kang was named "Most Imaginative Bartender of the Year" by the United States Bartenders' Guild and Bombay Sapphire in 2014 and the following year, she was named the Nevada Restaurant Association's Bartender of the Year. She was named one of Wine Enthusiast's top "40 Under 40 Tastemakers" in 2017.

== Early life and career ==
Juyoung Kang was born in Philadelphia, Pennsylvania. When she was 18-years-old, she answered a want ad and was hired as a banquet server. Eventually, she became a bartender at the restaurant after a bartender failed to show up for their shift to work during a wedding with 300 guests.

To familiarize herself with different spirits, Kang would go to local liquor stores and make notes about the different beverages sold. Kang was in college at the time, with hopes of working in marketing or filmmaking. She also studied wine, with interest in becoming a sommelier. In a 2016 interview with The Atlantic, Kang described school and studying wine as boring, and decided, after a tasting of Johnnie Walker whiskey, to pursue a career in bartending.

== Career ==
When you're creating a beverage menu, it's not about you, your creativity, or how cool your drinks are. It's about the guests that are sitting at your table. – Juyoung Kang, 2016

Kang decided to relocate from Philadelphia to California, where she preferred the California bartending trends of using fresh fruit. "It wasn't just about Jack and Cokes," she said in a 2016 interview. In Los Angeles, she bartended at The Peninsula Beverly Hills, followed by the Thompson Hotel.

Eventually, she relocated to Las Vegas, where she worked at Comme Ça and Rose.Rabbit.Lie. at the Cosmopolitan. At Comme Ça, Kang was mentored by bartender Sam Ross. She left the Cosmopolitan and opened Park on Fremont and Commonwealth, both in Downtown Las Vegas. She returned to the Las Vegas Strip and worked at The Linq's BLVD Cocktail Co.

Kang was lead bartender at Delmonico's Steakhouse at The Venetian from 2015 until 2017, taking over the bar from Max Solano. During her time at Delmonico's, Kang not only designed the seasonal cocktail menus, but also oversaw the restaurant's extensive whiskey selection. While at Delmonico's, Kang was named the Nevada Restaurant Association's Bartender of the Year.

Eventually, Kang left Delmonico's to become head mixologist at the Dorsey, which opened in 2016, also at the Venetian. At the Dorsey, Kang oversees the bar's Dorsey Sessions program, which brings bartenders from popular bars around the world to serve as bartenders in residence.

In 2018, Kang created a mint-based syrup for Cocktail Artist.

=== Style and cocktails ===
Kang describes designing a cocktail menu as a "long process." She notes that in Philadelphia, her drinks were more "booze forward," while in California, the drinks are longer lasting and "more refreshing," with Las Vegas cocktail culture being a bit of both styles.

Two of Kang's favorite types of drinks, and their variations, are a John Collins and Ramos Gin Fizz. In 2014, Kang was named Most Imaginative Bartender of the Year by the United States Bartenders' Guild and Bombay Sapphire for her variation on a Ramos Gin Fizz, the Lacy Fizz, which used a syrup made with eight spices and was garnished with flowers.

== Personal life ==
Three of Kang's favorite Las Vegas restaurants are Chada Thai, Raku and Izakaya Go. Kang's favorite bars include Other Mama, The Sand Dollar Lounge, District One Kitchen & Bar, Atomic Liquors, Bardot Brasserie, Herbs & Rye, the Vesper Bar, and the Laundry Room, the latter which she helped open. When Kang patronizes a bar, she asks the bartender to make whatever they want for her, preferring "a bit booze forward and bittersweet" cocktails.
