= John Collins (cocktail) =

Long drink of London dry gin, lemon juice, sugar and carbonated water

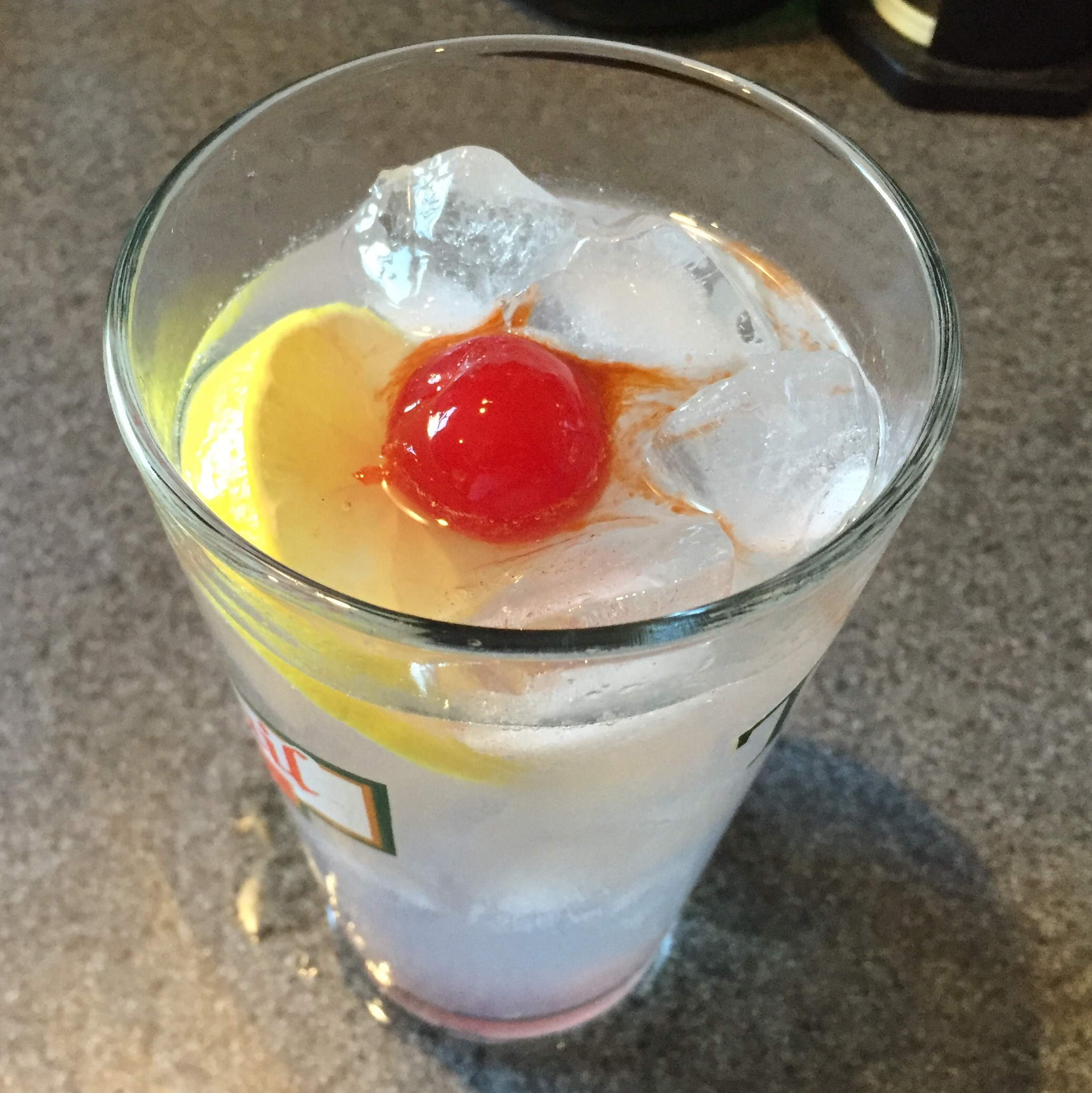
- Type: Mixed drink
- Ingredients: 45 ml gin; 30 ml fresh lemon juice; 15 ml simple syrup; 60 ml soda water
- Base spirit: Gin
- Standard drinkware: Collins glass
- Standard garnish: Lemon slice and maraschino cherry
- Served: On the rocks: poured over ice
- Preparation: Pour all ingredients directly into a Collins glass filled with ice. Stir gently.

A John Collins is a long drink of London dry gin, lemon juice, sugar and carbonated water, which was attested in 1869, but may be older. It is believed to have originated with a headwaiter of that name who worked at Limmer's Old House in Conduit Street in Mayfair, which was a popular London hotel and coffee house around 1790–1817. It is essentially a variant of Tom Collins, evidently a latter name for the same drink.

== Description ==
The John Collins is a Collins cocktail—that is, a long drink stirred with ice and topped with soda—made from London dry gin, lemon juice, sugar and carbonated water. A recipe for a John Collins is featured in the Steward and Barkeeper's Manual of 1869:

Teaspoonful of powdered sugar
The juice of half a lemon
A wine glass of Old Tom Gin
A bottle of plain soda
Shake up, or stir up with ice. Add a slice of lemon peel to finish.

Drinks historian David Wondrich has speculated that the original recipe that was introduced to New York in the 1850s would have been very similar to the gin punches that are known to have been served at London clubs such as the Garrick during the first half of the 19th century. He states that these would have been along the lines of gin, lemon juice, chilled soda water, and maraschino.

The specific call for Old Tom gin in the 1869 recipe is a likely cause for the subsequent name change to "Tom Collins" in Jerry Thomas's 1876 recipe. In contemporary parlance, the John Collins refers to a Tom Collins made with whiskey instead of gin. Earlier versions of the gin punch are likely to have used Dutch gin instead.

== In popular culture ==
The following rhyme was written by Frank and Charles Sheridan about John Collins:

My name is John Collins, head waiter at Limmer's,
Corner of Conduit Street, Hanover Square,
My chief occupation is filling brimmers
For all the young gentlemen frequenters there.

== See also ==
- Punch (drink)
- Singapore Sling
