= Highball =

Type of mixed alcoholic drink

- Type: Long drink
- Origin: Spritzer
- Introduced: 1830s England
- Ingredients: 1-2 parts liquor; 2+ parts drink mixer; On the rocks
- Standard drinkware: Highball glass

The highball is defined as an alcoholic beverage that is "built in a highball glass" and which calls "for a base spirit and mixer, such as soda or water." It is a type of long drink consisting of one or two parts of liquor, mixed over ice with upwards of two parts of a typically carbonated mixer. Stemming from the 1830s English re-interpretation of the Austro-Venetian spritzer, the highball was further expanded upon in America in the early 20th century, and was known worldwide by the mid-century, particularly in Japan.

== Etymology ==
The etymology of the term "highball" is shrouded by folk etymologies, in part due to the term's other meanings beyond drinking. The name came about in America around 1895, as a neologism for the newly popular scotch and soda spread from Britain. A prevailing theory is that is it derives from the Irish English "ball," or glass; the highball drink inherited the name from the taller highball glass, as opposed to the short lowball glass. Mixologist Gary Regan supported a different etymology stemming from the contemporary "highball" train whistle code, consisting of two short blasts followed by one long, comparable to the shorthand recipe for the highball.

Around the time of its introduction to America, the highball was also known as the splificator. According to writer David Wondrich, the term derives from the Irish English slang "splificated", meaning "drunk". Wondrich attests to a 1886 recipe for the splificator made from rye and ginger ale. In the 1895 American book The Mixicologist by C.F. Lawler, the "splificator" is described as a whiskey and soda, whilst the "high ball" is described as consisting of whiskey or brandy with soda. The term splificator was used for rye & ginger ale through American Prohibition but had been overtaken by the term highball by the 1950s.

== History ==
A highball without enough ice is a sickly mess, and a warm cocktail is revolting.

— Victor Jules "Trader Vic" Bergeron, Jr., 1972

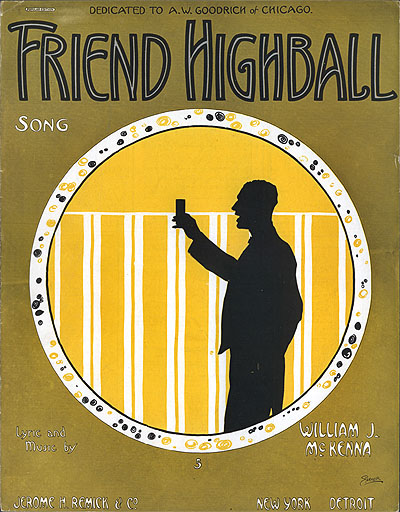
Sheet music cover for the 1915 "Friend Highball" by William J. McKenna

The highball originated in Great Britain in the 1830s, following the introduction of the spritzer from Austrian Venice: George Gordon, Lord Byron introduced the drink to the British zeitgeist with his 1819 poem Don Juan, but the constituent white wine began to be replaced with brandy, mixed with soda water. The drink format remained popular in Britain through the 19th century, through the introduction of the Tom Collins. Following the Great French Wine Blight, the whiskey and soda became popular, and became entrenched in America as imports of Scotch whisky and Irish whiskey replaced French wine imports.

In the early 20th century, further variations were introduced: liquors used expanded to rye whiskey and bourbon, and variations swapped the typical soda water of highballs began to be swapped for sodas like ginger ale and Coca-Cola, ultimately giving rise to the Cuba Libre. The highball spread through Latin America in the 40s and 50s with further variation, giving rise to the batanga. By the mid-20th century, the highball had become globally ubiquitous as a common mixed drink format.

=== Japan ===
Introduced to Japan in the American occupation, the term highball (Japanese: ハイボール, romanized: haibōru) became synonymous with Japanese whisky and soda in particular. The drink regained popularity particularly among Japanese women following an 2008 ad campaign by Suntory starring Kato Koyuki, targeting the women demographic. In the early 2010s, there began to be "highball bars" that specialized in wide whiskey selections for highballs.

== List of highballs ==
- Gin and tonic
- Rickey
- Screwdriver
- Whiskey and soda

== See also ==
- Fizz (cocktail)
