= Sour (cocktail) =

Family of classic mixed drinks

Sours
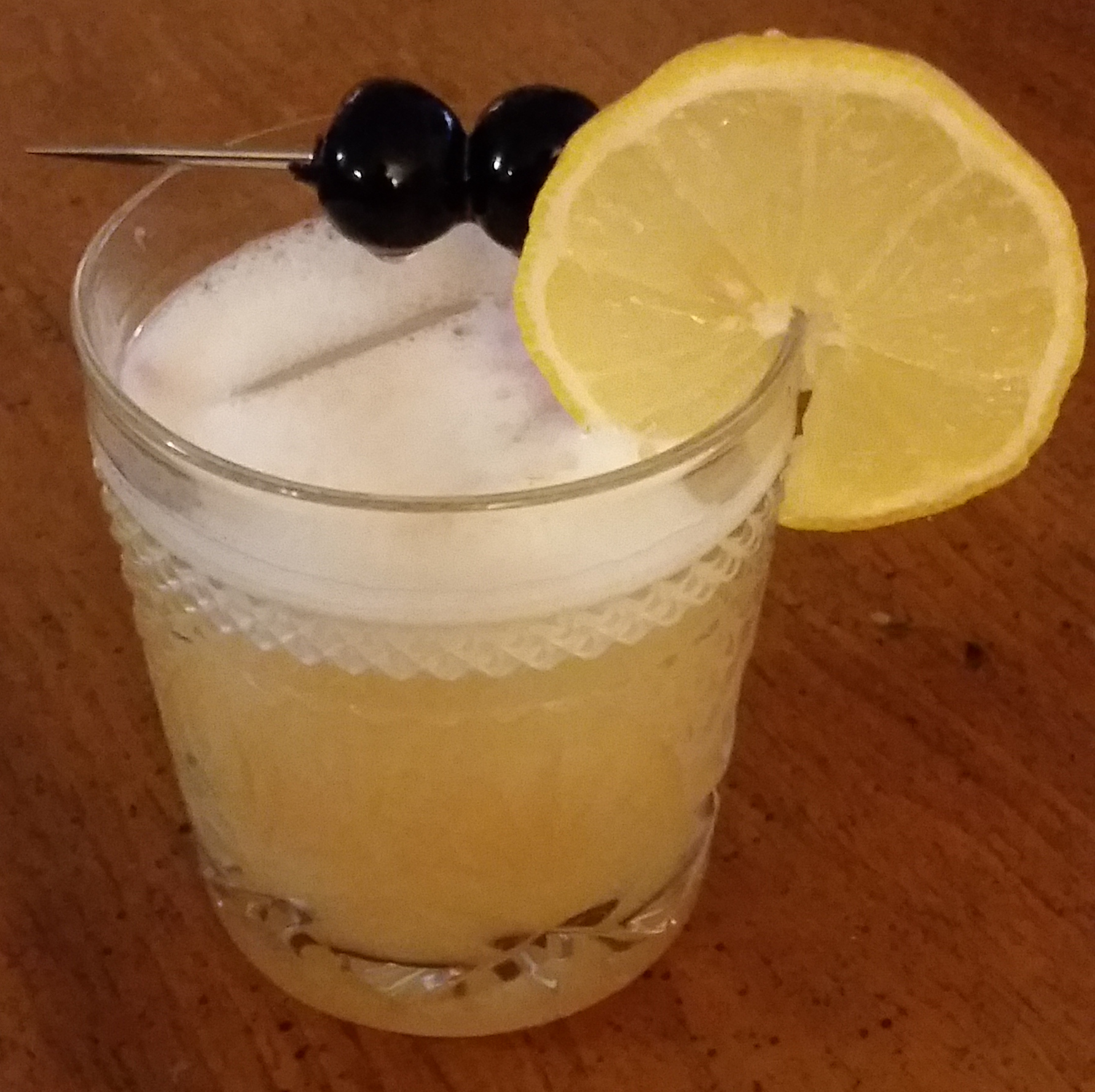
- A whiskey sour garnished with a wheel of lemon and maraschino cherries.
- Type: Cocktail family
- Base spirit: Gin, Bourbon whiskey, Brandy, Pisco, Rum, Amaretto

A sour is a traditional family of mixed drinks. Sours belong to one of the old families of original cocktails and are described by Jerry Thomas in his 1862 book How to Mix Drinks.

Sours are mixed drinks containing a base liquor, lemon or lime juice, and a sweetener (simple syrup or orgeat syrup). Egg whites are also included in some sours.

In contemporary mixology, fresh citrus juice in sours is increasingly being replaced by super juice (created via the oleo citrate method). This stabilized alternative maintains a consistent pH and acidity level while drastically reducing fruit waste, though bartenders must adjust the sugar balance in classic recipes to compensate for the lower natural sugar content of the substitute.

== Types of sours ==
=== Gin sour ===
The gin sour is a traditional mixed cocktail that predates Prohibition in the United States. It is a simple combination of gin, lemon juice, and sugar. Adding carbonated water to this turns it into a gin fizz.

It was popular during the 1940s, and Kevin Starr includes it in "an array of drinks (the gin sour, the whiskey sour, the gin Rickey, the Tom Collins, the pink lady, the old fashioned) that now seem period pieces, evocative of another era".

=== Pisco sour ===
The classic pisco sour recipe contains pisco brandy (usually an un-aged grape brandy from Perú), fresh lime juice, fresh lemon juice, simple syrup, egg white, and bitters. It is shaken, strained, and served straight in a cocktail glass then garnished with the bitters (cinnamon can be used). The addition of egg white creates a foamy head when shaken before serving. While pisco sour is flavoured with key lime by default, pisco is combined with other fruit to create mango sour, maracuya (passion fruit) sour, lucuma sour and so forth. Peru has a National Pisco Sour Day (which lasts a weekend) in mid-February, and Chile has Pisco Day in mid-May.

=== Rum sour ===
The basic Daiquiri, sometimes called a Daiquiri sour, is made with rum, lime juice and simple syrup. One account of the drink's origin is that the general manager of the Spanish-American Iron Core Company, which operated the "Daiquiri" mine, ran out of gin one night when making gin sour for his guests, and switched to rum. This rum sour became known as the Daiquiri. However, earlier printed recipes for rum sour exist such as one from Jerry Thomas from 1887.

=== Whiskey sour ===
The whiskey sour is a mixed drink containing bourbon whiskey or rye whiskey, lemon juice, sugar, and optionally a dash of egg white to make it a Boston Sour. It is shaken and served either straight or over ice. The traditional garnish is half an orange slice and a maraschino cherry. If floated with claret red wine it's called a New York sour.

A notable variant of the whiskey sour is the Ward 8, which often is based with either bourbon or rye whiskey, both lemon and orange juices, and grenadine syrup as the sweetener. The egg white sometimes employed in other whiskey sours is generally not included in this variation.

=== Other sours ===
- Amaretto sour: Amaretto liqueur, lemon juice and sometimes egg white, bitters or sugar syrup.
- Brandy sour or brandy daisy (Jerry Thomas, 1887): brandy, clear or orange curaçao, sugar, lemon juice, shaken and strained into a wine glass.
- Caipirinha: Cachaça, sugar, lime, ice in an old fashioned glass.
- Cypriot brandy sour: Cyprus brandy, lemon cordial and bitters, stirred in a tall glass, and topped with soda or lemonade.
- Midori sour: Honeydew melon liquor, grenadine, lemon juice. Poured properly, it resembles a green tequila sunrise with visible layers.
- Santa Cruz sour (Jerry Thomas, 1887): Santa Cruz rum, sugar, lemon juice, shaken and strained into a wine glass.
- Tequila sour: Tequila, lemon juice, lime juice, agave nectar, Bittercube Corazon bitters, egg white.

== See also ==
- List of cocktails
- List of lemon dishes and beverages
- Daisy (cocktail), a class of cocktails similar to a sour but sweetened with a liqueur rather than syrup or sugar

== Notes ==
1. Jacques Barzun, 2001 (reprint), Mr. Dooley in Peace and in War, University of Illinois, ISBN 0-252-07029-1. Originally published by Small, Maynard and Co., 1898. Collected from newspaper columns. Online sources cite 1897 as the year of this particular quotation.
2. Kevin Starr, 2002, "Embattled Dreams: California in War and Peace, 1940–1950 (Americans and the California Dream)", Oxford University Press, ISBN 0-19-512437-5, A9 page image
3. Tom Bullock, 1917, The Ideal Bartender. Project Gutenberg eBook. The directions "½ Lime Juice" and "½ Orange Juice" are as given in the source and presumably refer to the juice of half a lime and half an orange, respectively.
