= Salmoncito =

Mexican cocktail with gin, Campari, tonic, and grapefruit

Salmoncito is a cocktail composed of gin, Campari, tonic water and grapefruit served in a highball glass. It was created in 2013 by Khristian de la Torre at Maison Artemisia in Mexico City. Its name means "little salmon" and refers to the color of the cocktail.
