= Boker =

Boker may refer to:

== Surname (Boker) ==
- George Henry Boker (1823-1890), an American poet, playwright, and diplomat
- John G. Boker, creator of Boker’s Bitters (1828)
- John Robert Boker, Jr. (1913-2003), an award-winning philatelist
- Nava Boker (1970), an Israeli politician and journalist
- Zeev Boker, an Israeli Ambassador

== Place ==
- Sde Boker, a kibbutz in Israel

== Company ==
- Böker, a German cutlery company
