= Shoomaker's Saloon =

Former bar in Washington DC

Coordinates: 38.896°N 77.029°W

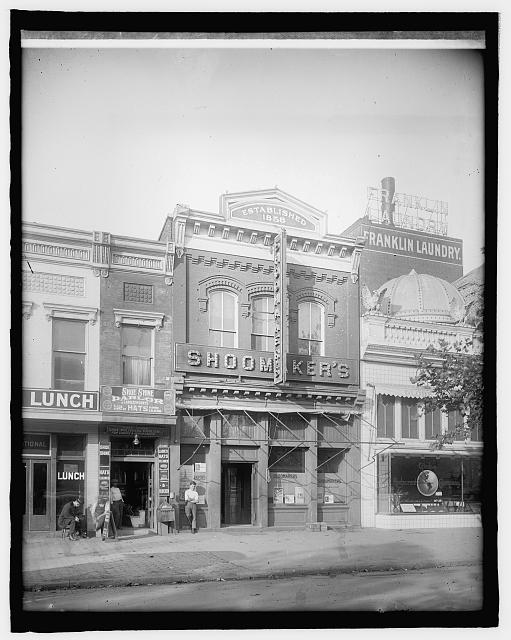
Shoomaker's Saloon (c. 1917) 1331 E Street NW, Washington, DC

Shoomaker's Saloon, a favorite bar of lobbyists and politicians, was located on Washington, DC's Rum Row. It is widely known as the birthplace of the Rickey cocktail.

== History ==
In 1858, German immigrants R.H. Otto "Charlie' Hertzog and Wilhelm (William) Shoomaker opened Shoomaker's Saloon at 1331 E Street NW in Washington, DC. This stretch of E Street was known as Rum Row for its abundance of drinking establishments. Shoomaker's or Shoo's as it was known, was purchased by Democratic lobbyist Colonel Joseph Rickey in 1883 after the deaths of Herzog and Shoomaker.

In 1909, writer Elbert Hubbard described Shoomaker's in detail saying:

...Shoomaker's is a grocery — a wet grocery — where no groceries have been sold since Lee surrendered to Grant. There are boxes piled to the ceiling in this grocery, and you make your way thru a narrow passage, past barrels and kegs and find yourself in the back room, vulgarly called the barroom. Outside the place is guiltless of paint, and the architecture is an eyesore to the surrounding neighbors. Near at hand are proud and lofty sky-scrapers, and counting-houses gay in their glitter of gaud and gold. So here sits Shoomaker's, elbowing the rich and elegant shops and stores, and betimes making much monies. The shabbiness of the place is its asset; the cobwebs are its charm.

Shoomaker's moved to 1311 E Street NW in 1914.

The Sheppard Act closed all saloons in the District on November 1, 1917—more than two years before national Prohibition began. It is reported that Shoomaker's closed at 10 p.m. on October 31, when they ran out of liquor. Shoomaker's reopened serving soft drinks, but was not successful. It closed in March 1918.

The J.W. Marriott Hotel now stands at Shoomaker's original 1331 E Street NW location.

== The Rickey ==
The Rickey cocktail is said to have been invented at Shoomaker's in the late 1800s by bartender George Williamson who named the drink after the bar's owner.

In 2011, 1331 Bar and Lounge inside of the J.W. Marriott commemorated the creation of the Gin Rickey at Shoomaker's with a plaque.
