= Rum Collins =

Rum based cocktail

A Rum Collins is a cocktail based on the Tom Collins substituting a light rum for the gin. It can also be referred to as a Ron Collins, "Ron" being the Spanish word for rum.

== Ingredients ==
- 2oz light rum
- Juice of one lime
- 1 teaspoon granulated sugar
- Carbonated water
- Lemon slice
- Cocktail cherry
- Ice cubes

== Mixing ==
Shake the rum, lime juice and sugar and pour into a Collins glass over ice. Fill glass with carbonated water, garnish with lemon and cherry and serve.

== Cultural references ==
James Bond was served a Rum Collins by Largo in the film Thunderball (1965). Hope Holiday asks for a Rum Collins in the film The Apartment (1960). Katherine March (Joan Bennett) orders one in Scarlet Street (1945). Also in 1945, Bert Pierce (Bruce Bennett) orders two Rum Collins for himself and ex-wife Mildred Pierce (Joan Crawford) in the eponymous movie when he takes her to see their daughter Veda performing at a tropical-themed nightclub. Arthur Peabody (William Powell) orders one in Mr. Peabody and the Mermaid (1948). Inspector Vance (Donald MacBride) orders one in Murder Over New York (1940). Sikorsky (Christopher Lloyd) also orders a Rum Collins in The Dream Team (1989). Carmody is served a Rum Collins by the omnipotent Melichrone in the novel Dimension of Miracles (1968).
