= Rum and Coke =

Highball cocktail

Cuba libre
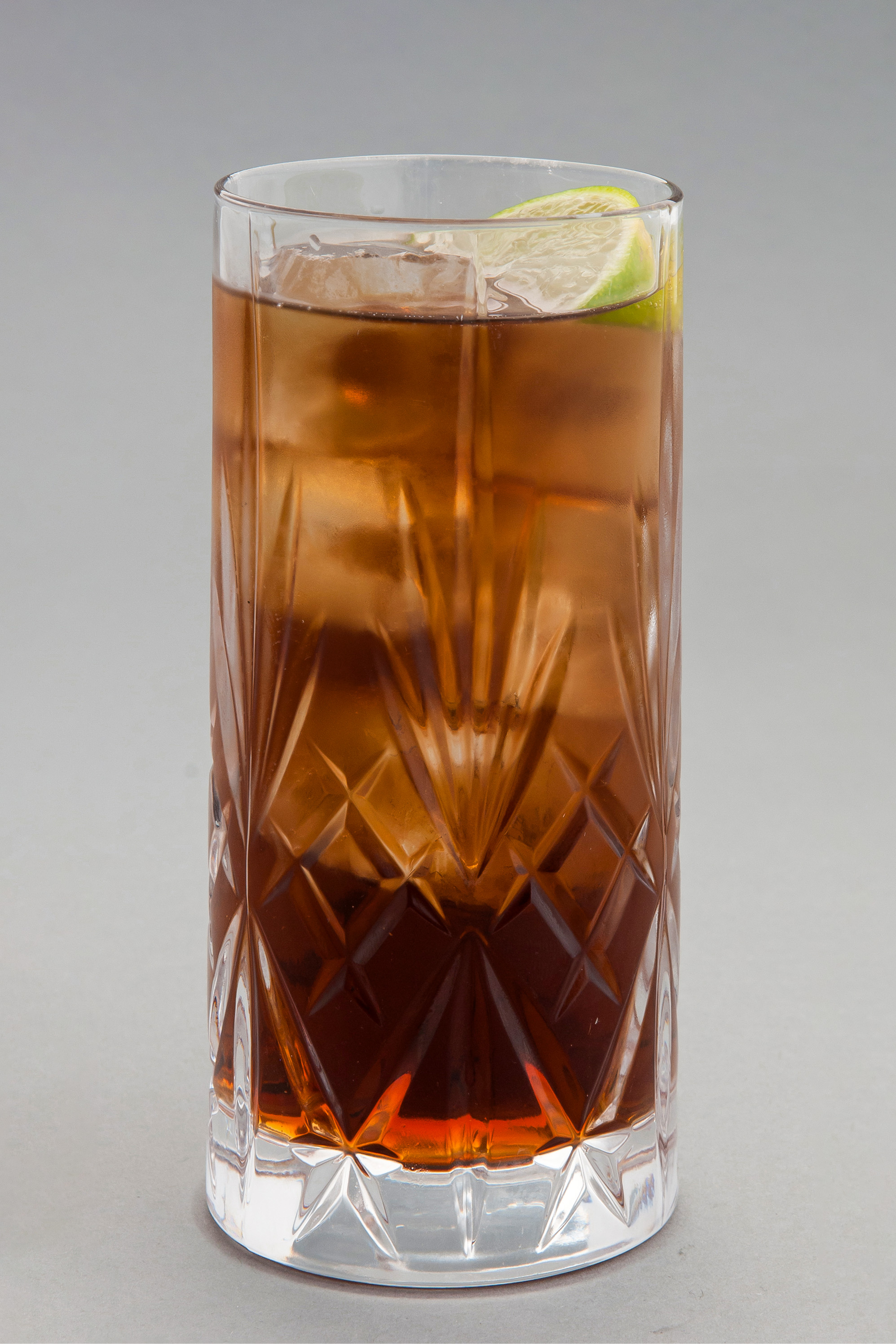
- Type: Cocktail
- Ingredients: 120 ml cola; 50 ml white rum; 10 ml fresh lime juice
- Base spirit: Rum
- Standard drinkware: Highball glass
- Standard garnish: Lime wedge
- Served: On the rocks: poured over ice
- Preparation: Build all ingredients in a highball glass filled with ice. Garnish with lime wedge.

Rum and Coke, or the Cuba libre (/ˌkjuːbə ˈliːbreɪ/ KEW-bə LEE-bray, Spanish: [ˈkuβa ˈliβɾe]; literally "Free Cuba"), is a highball cocktail consisting of cola, rum, and in many recipes lime juice on ice. Traditionally, the cola ingredient is Coca-Cola ("Coke") and the alcohol is a light rum such as Bacardi; however, the drink may be made with various types of rums and cola brands, and lime juice may or may not be included.

The cocktail originated in the early 20th century in Cuba, after the country won independence in the Spanish–American War. It subsequently became popular across Cuba, the United States, and other countries. Its simple recipe and inexpensive, ubiquitous ingredients have made it one of the world's most popular alcoholic drinks. Drink critics often consider the drink mediocre, but it has been noted for its historical significance.

== History ==
The drink was created in Cuba in the early 1900s, but its exact origins are not certain. It became popular shortly after 1900, when bottled Coca-Cola was first imported into Cuba from the United States. Its origin is associated with the heavy U.S. presence in Cuba following the Spanish–American War of 1898; the drink's traditional name, "Cuba libre" (Free Cuba), was the slogan of the Cuban independence movement. The Cuba libre is sometimes said to have been created during the Spanish–American War. However, this predates the first distribution of Coca-Cola to Cuba in 1900. A drink called a "Cuba libre" was indeed known in 1898, but this was a mix of water and brown sugar.

Fausto Rodriguez, a Bacardi advertising executive, claimed to have been present when the drink was first poured, and produced a notarized affidavit to that effect in 1965. According to Rodriguez, this took place in August 1900, when he was a 14-year-old messenger working for a member of the U.S. Army Signal Corps in Havana. One day at a local bar, Rodriguez's employer ordered Bacardi rum mixed with Coca-Cola. This intrigued a nearby group of American soldiers, who ordered a round for themselves, giving birth to a popular new drink. Bacardi published Rodriguez's affidavit in a Life magazine ad in 1966. However, Rodriguez's status as a Bacardi executive has led some commentators to doubt the veracity of his story. Another story states that the drink was first created in 1902 at Havana's El Floridita restaurant to celebrate the anniversary of Cuban independence.

The drink became a staple in Cuba, catching on due to the pervasiveness of its ingredients. Havana was already known for its iced drinks in the 19th century, as it was one of the few warm-weather cities that had abundant stores of ice shipped down from colder regions. Bacardi and other Cuban rums also boomed after independence brought in large numbers of foreign tourists and investors, as well as new opportunities for exporting alcohol. Light rums such as Bacardi became favored for cocktails as they were considered to mix well. Coca-Cola had been a common mixer in the United States ever since it was first bottled in 1886, and it became a ubiquitous drink in many countries after it was first exported in 1900.

Rum and Coke quickly spread from Cuba to the United States. In the early 20th century the cocktail, like Coca-Cola itself, was most popular in the Southern United States. During the Prohibition era from 1922 to 1933, Coca-Cola became a favored mixer for disguising the taste of low-quality rums, as well as other liquors. In 1921 H. L. Mencken jokingly wrote of a South Carolina variant called the "jump stiddy", which consisted of Coca-Cola mixed with denatured alcohol drained from automobile radiators. After Prohibition, rum and Coke became prevalent in the northern and western U.S. as well, and in both high-brow and low-brow circles.

Rum and Coke achieved a new level of popularity during World War II. Starting in 1940, the United States established a series of outposts in the British West Indies to defend against the German Navy. The American presence created cross-cultural demand, with American servicemen and the locals developing tastes for each other's products. In particular, American military personnel took to Caribbean rum due to its inexpensiveness, while Coca-Cola became especially prevalent in the islands thanks to the company shipping it out with the military. Within the United States, imported rum became increasingly popular, as government quotas for industrial alcohol reduced the output of American distillers of domestic liquors.

In 1943, Lord Invader's Calypso song "Rum and Coca-Cola" drew further attention to the drink in Trinidad. The song was an adaptation of Lionel Belasco's 1904 composition "L'Année Passée" with new lyrics about American soldiers in Trinidad cavorting with local girls and drinking rum and Coke. Comedian Morey Amsterdam plagiarized "Rum and Coca-Cola" and licensed it to the Andrews Sisters as his own work. The Andrews Sisters' version was a major hit in 1945 and further boosted the popularity of rum and Coke, especially in the military. Lord Invader and the owners of Belasco's composition successfully sued Amsterdam for the song's rights.

During the Cuban Revolution in 1959, Bacardi fled to Puerto Rico. The following year, the U.S. placed an embargo against Cuba, which made Cuban-made rum unavailable in the U.S. and Coca-Cola largely unavailable in Cuba. As such, it became difficult to make a rum and Coke with its traditional ingredients in either country.

== Popularity and reception ==
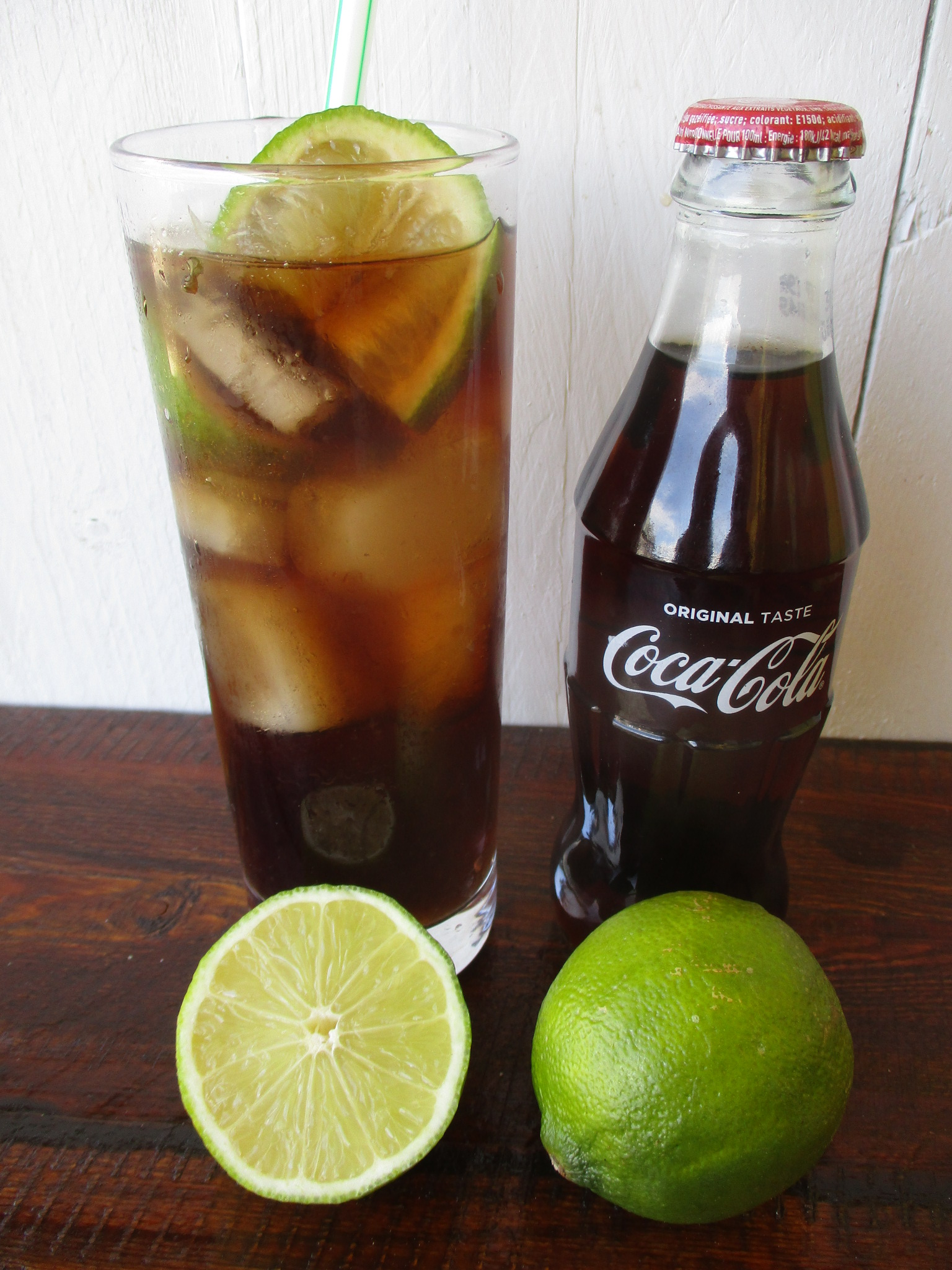
A Cuba libre with Coca-Cola and lime

The rum and Coke is very popular; Bacardi says that it is the world's second-most-popular alcoholic drink. Its popularity derives from the ubiquity and low cost of the main ingredients, and the fact that it is very easy to make. As it can be made with any quantity or style of rum, it is simple to prepare and difficult to ruin.

Drink critics often have a low opinion of the cocktail. Writer Wayne Curtis called it "a drink of inspired blandness", while Jason Wilson of The Washington Post called it "a lazy person's drink". Troy Patterson of Slate called it "the classic mediocre Caribbean-American highball", which "became a classic despite not being especially good".

Charles A. Coulombe considers the Cuba libre a historically important drink, writing that it is "a potent symbol of a changing world order – the marriage of rum, lubricant of the old colonial empires, and Coca-Cola, icon of modern American global capitalism". Additionally, both rum and Coca-Cola are made from Caribbean ingredients and became global commodities through European and American commerce. According to Coulombe, the drink "seems to reflect perfectly the historical elements of the modern world".

== Recipe and variations ==
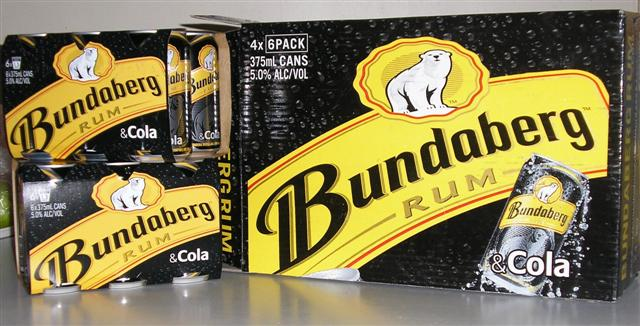
Pre-mixed Bundaberg Rum & Cola, 2006

Recipes vary somewhat in measures and additional ingredients, but the main ingredients are always rum and cola. The International Bartenders Association Cuba Libre recipe calls for 5 centiliters of light rum, 12 cl of cola, and 1 cl of fresh lime juice on ice. However, any amount and proportion of rum and cola may be used. Additionally, while light rum is traditional, dark rums and other varieties are also common.

Coca-Cola is the conventional cola in the drink, to the point that customers rarely order anything else. This dates back to the origin of the drink in Cuba and was solidified in the 1920s when Coca-Cola emerged as the primary cola brand following the bankruptcy of Pepsi and Chero-Cola, and therefore the preferred cola mixer in alcoholic drinks. Pepsi's later attempts to enter the cocktail market were unsuccessful, especially after the song "Rum and Coca-Cola" solidified the association in the public imagination.

Nonetheless, different colas are sometimes used. In Cuba, as Coca-Cola has not been imported since the U.S. embargo of 1960, the domestic TuKola is used in Cuba libres. Other common variants call for Mexican Coke (which uses cane sugar instead of high-fructose corn syrup), Moxie, Diet Coke (the Cuba Lite or rum and Diet) and Dr. Pepper (the Captain and Pepper, featuring Captain Morgan spiced rum).

Lime is traditionally included in the drink, though it is often left out, especially when the order is for just "rum and Coke". Some early recipes called for lime juice to be mixed in; others included lime only as a garnish. Other early recipes called for additional ingredients such as gin and bitters. Some sources consider lime essential for a drink to be a true Cuba libre, which they distinguish from a mere rum and Coke. However, lime is frequently included even in orders for "rum and Coke".

When aged añejo rum is used, the drink is sometimes called a Cubata, a name also used informally in Spain for any Cuba libre. Some modern recipes inspired by older ones include additional ingredients such as bitters. More elaborate variants with further ingredients include the cinema highball, which uses rum infused with buttered popcorn and mixed with cola. Another is the Mandeville cocktail, which includes light and dark rum, cola, and citrus juice along with Pernod absinthe and grenadine.

== See also ==
- Piscola, a similarly constructed cocktail made of pisco and cola
- Whiskey and Coke
