= Brandy sour =

Alcoholic cocktail

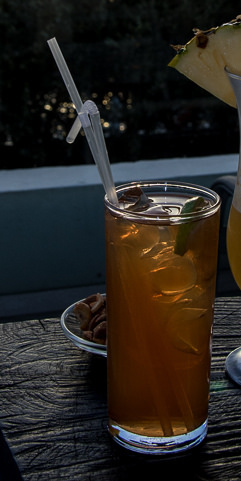
- Type: Cocktail
- Ingredients: 5 cl (two parts) Cyprus brandy; 2.5 cl (one part) lemon squash; 2–4 drops of bitters; Top with carbonated water
- Standard drinkware: Highball glass
- Served: On the rocks: poured over ice
- Preparation: Stir into glass over ice, garnish and serve.

The brandy sour is a mixed alcoholic cocktail considered the unofficial national cocktail of Cyprus. While other forms of the brandy sour cocktail exist, the Cypriot variety is a distinct mixture, which only shares the basic brandy and lemon flavourings with other variants. Both brandy and lemons are among Cyprus's major exports, and both have distinctive Cypriot characteristics.

== History ==
The Cypriot brandy sour style was developed following the introduction of the first blended brandy made on Cyprus, by the Haggipavlu family, in the early 1930s. The cocktail is said to have been developed by barman Mr Sourmelis at the Forest Park Hotel, in the hill-resort of Plátres, for the young King Farouk of Egypt, who often stayed at the hotel during his frequent visits to the island. The brandy sour was supposedly introduced as an alcoholic substitute for iced tea, as a way of disguising the Muslim monarch's preference for Western-style cocktails. The story lacks credibility, because no matter how lavish and extravagant the lifestyle of King Farouk was, he did not drink alcohol. The drink subsequently spread to other bars and hotels in the fashionable Platres area, before making its way to the coastal resorts of Limassol, Paphos and Kyrenia, and the capital Nicosia.

== Recipe and ingredients ==
A typical recipe for a Cypriot brandy sour includes:

- 5 cl (2 parts) Cypriot brandy (typically KEO VSOP or Haggipavlu Anglias brands)
- 2.5 cl (1 part) Cypriot lemon squash
- 2–4 drops of bitters (Angostura or Cypriot Cock Drops brands)
- Top up with soda water (some use lemonade instead)
- Ice

Cocktail brandy produced in Cyprus is typically less strongly flavoured than cognac or armagnac, and most brands have a caramel-biased aftertaste balance. Cyprus also produces distinctive, yellow-green coloured, bitter lemons — used by British author Lawrence Durrell for the title for his autobiographical novel Bitter Lemons of Cyprus. These lemons are used locally to produce a bitter-sweet lemon cordial, which forms the sour and bitter base for the brandy sour cocktail. Bitters are added to taste, and while the locally produced Cock Drops brand is widely available on the island, the internationally recognised Angostura brand is increasingly used. These ingredients are added to a tall glass and stirred, before the glass is topped up with lemonade (for a classic, slightly sweeter drink) or soda water (for less sweetness and a more pronounced brandy flavour), and plenty of ice. It is quite common to decorate the Brandy Sour cocktail with sugar on the rim of the highball glass and a Maraschino cherry.

== See also ==
- Brandy daisy
- Sour (cocktail)
