= Martinez (cocktail) =

Cocktail made with Old Tom gin and vermouth

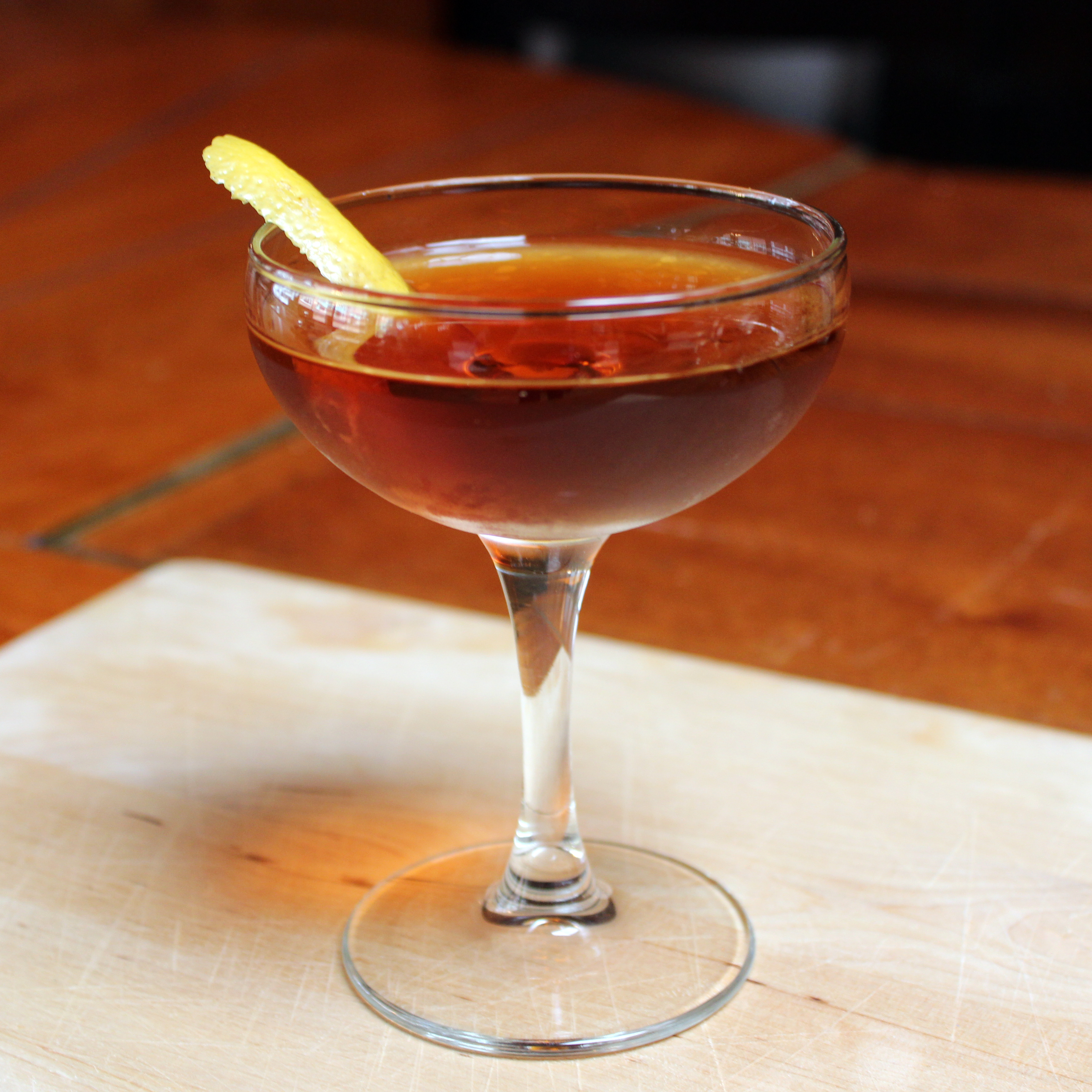
- Type: Cocktail
- Ingredients: 45 ml London Dry Gin; 45 ml Sweet Red Vermouth; 1 Bar Spoon Maraschino Liqueur; 2 Dashes Orange Bitters
- Base spirit: Gin
- Standard drinkware: Cocktail glass
- Standard garnish: lemon zest
- Served: Straight up: chilled, without ice
- Preparation: Stirred over ice, strained into a chilled glass, garnished, and served up.

The Martinez is a classic cocktail that is widely regarded as the direct precursor to the Martini. It serves as the basis for many modern cocktails, and several different versions of the original exist. These are generally distinguished by the accompaniment of either maraschino or curaçao, as well as differences in gin or bitters.

== History ==
The true origin of the Martinez cocktail is unclear. Two early stories attribute the making of a cocktail named the Martinez to bartender Jerry Thomas at the Occidental Hotel or by a bartender by the name of Richelieue who worked at a saloon in Martinez, California. Both stories are difficult to verify because records of drinks at the time are missing or incomplete, but the 1887 edition of Thomas' The Bar-Tender's Guide includes a recipe for the Martinez. It calls for a pony of Old Tom gin, a glass of vermouth, two dashes of Maraschino, and a dash of Boker's Bitters with ice, garnished with a slice of lemon.

An 1884 drink guide by O.H. Byron released just a few years earlier also listed a recipe for a cocktail called the Martinez by saying only: "Same as Manhattan, only you substitute gin for whisky." The book contained two recipes for a Manhattan, one of which called for 2 dashes of curaçao, 2 dashes of Angostura bitters, 1/2 a wine-glass whisky and 1/2 a wine-glass of Italian vermouth.

A later 1888 guide by Harry Johnson, the New and Improved Illustrated Bartender's Manual, listed a drink that may have been incorrectly spelled as the "martine", without the letter "z". The recipes and names eventually evolved to become two different cocktails, the Martinez and the Martini.

== Martinez ingredients ==
After Jerry Thomas' recipe for the Martinez, as well as Byron's, ingredients for the drink that would retain the name Martinez began to take more firm shape, with most variations based on differences between the use of maraschino or curaçao. The Old Mr. Boston Official Bartender's Guide called for 1 oz dry gin, 1 oz French vermouth, 1/4 tsp curaçao, and a dash of orange bitters. In the 1940 The Official Mixers Manual by Patrick Gavin Duffy the drink calls for gin, dry vermouth, orange bitters, and "4 teaspoons Curaçao or Maraschino". In 1947 Trader Vic's called for 3/4 oz gin, 3/4 oz French vermouth, 1/2 tsp orange bitters, and 1/2 tsp curaçao.

Difford's Guide lists several versions, including an "Old Tom" version with Old Tom gin, maraschino, and angostura bitters, a "London Dry" version with dry gin, maraschino, and angostura bitters, and an "Orange" version with dry gin, curaçao, and orange bitters.

== See also ==
- List of cocktails
