= South Side (cocktail) =

Alcoholic beverage

South Side or Southside
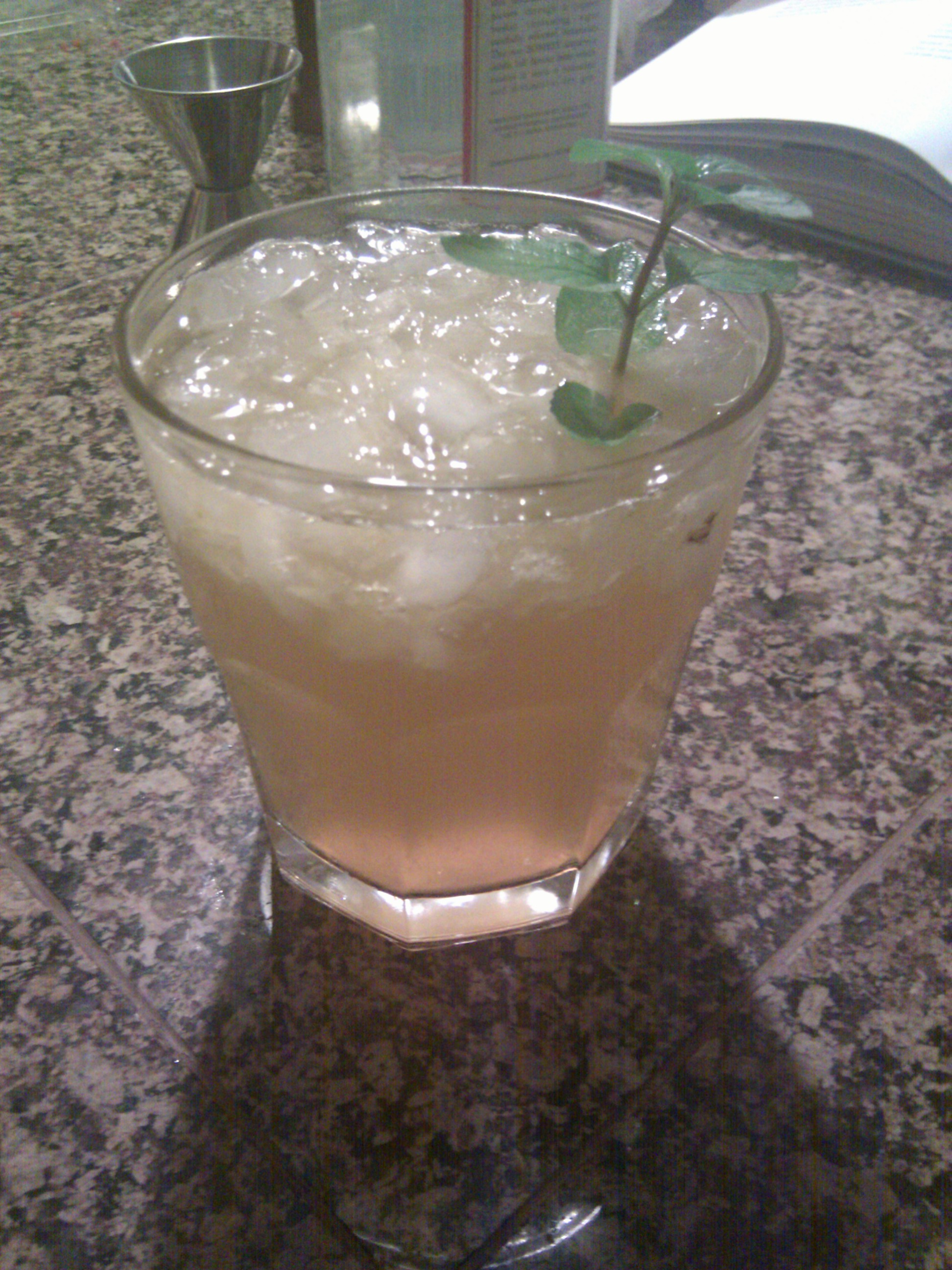
- Type: Cocktail
- Ingredients: 60 ml London Dry gin; 30 ml lemon juice; 15 ml simple syrup; 5–6 mint leaves; few drops of egg white (Optional)
- Base spirit: Gin
- Standard drinkware: Cocktail glass
- Standard garnish: mint sprigs
- Served: Straight up: chilled, without ice
- Preparation: Pour all ingredients into a cocktail shaker, shake well with ice, double-strain into chilled cocktail glass

A South Side or Southside is an alcoholic beverage made with gin, lemon juice, simple syrup and mint. A variant, the Southside Fizz, adds soda water.

== History ==
Its origins are subject to speculation. It has been proposed that it gets its name from either the South Side district of the city of Chicago, Illinois, or from the Southside Sportsmen's Club on Long Island.

The drink may have been the preferred beverage of Al Capone, whose gang dominated Chicago's South Side. The gin imported by Capone's rivals on the North Side of Chicago was smooth, and usually consumed with ginger ale. However, the gin consumed by Al Capone's gang had a rougher finish, and required more sweeteners to make it palatable. Thus the South Side was born.

== 21 Club recipe ==
The following list of ingredients for a south side is used by the famed 21 Club in New York City.

- 2 US fluid ounces (59 ml) Tanqueray gin
- 1 US fluid ounce (30 ml) mint simple syrup
- 4–5 fresh mint leaves
- juice of one lemon
- splash of soda

== South Side Fizz ==
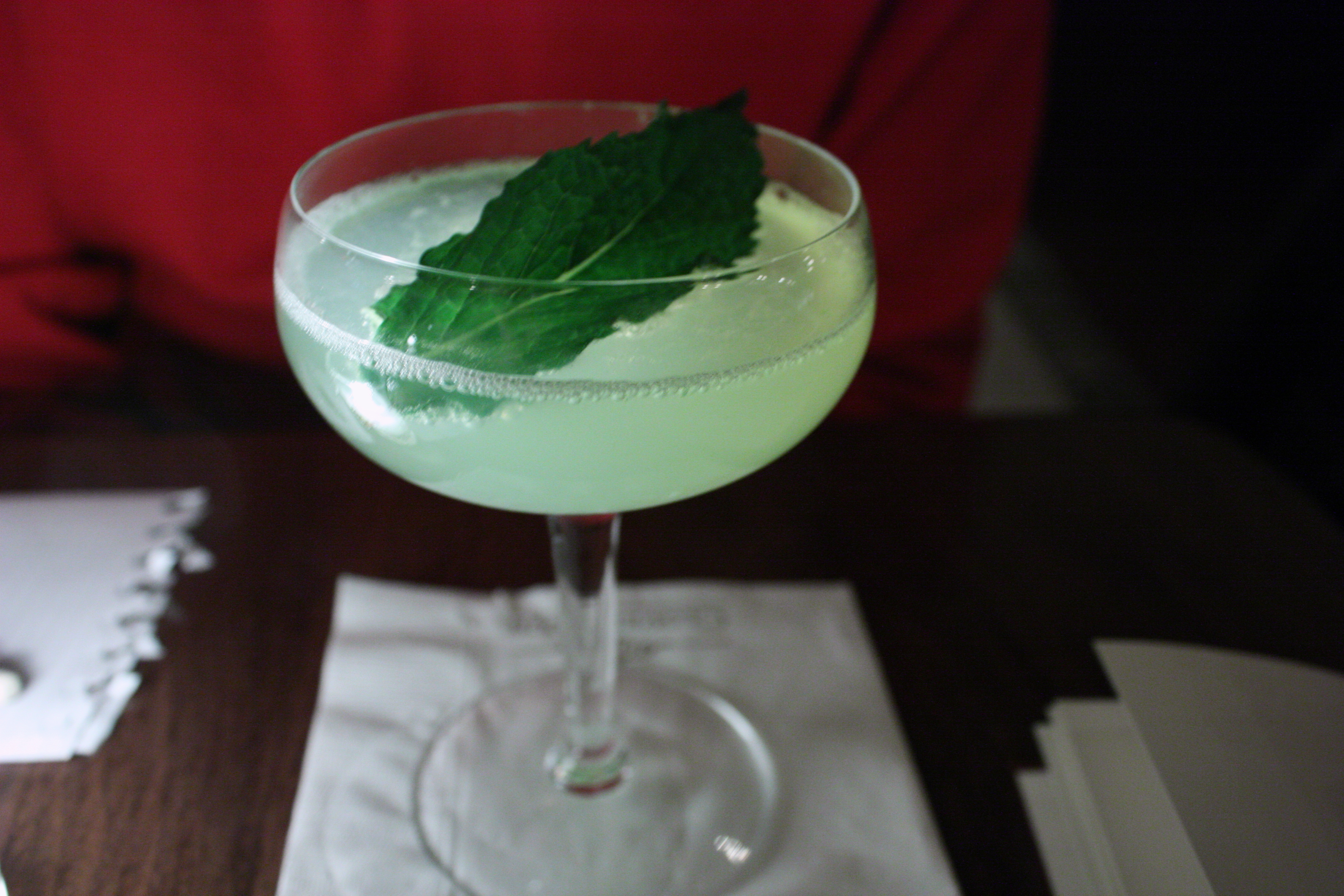
South Side Fizz

A South Side Fizz adds soda water:

- 1.25 US fluid ounces (37 ml) gin
- 1/2 US fluid ounce (15 ml) lime juice
- 1/2 US fluid ounce (15 ml) simple syrup
- 1 sprig mint (and one for garnish)
- club soda

In a shaker, muddle the mint, lime juice and simple syrup. Add the gin and fill with ice. Shake, and strain into a highball glass filled with crushed ice. Stir until frost appears on the outside of the glass. Fill with club soda and garnish with another mint sprig.

== Related drinks ==
The Tom Collins does not include mint, and is carbonated.
