= Jerry Thomas Speakeasy =

Bar in Rome

The Jerry Thomas Speakeasy, also called the Jerry Thomas Project, is a drinking establishment in Campo de' Fiori, Rome. The bar was opened in 2010, by Leonardo Leuci. It is named after the Nineteenth century American bartender Jerry Thomas, and themed after a speakeasy from the Prohibition era. The speakeasy is known for enforcing a list of rules, such as banning vodka from the premises, requiring patrons to have a paid membership, and having a password for entry that changes daily. It has been included on the list of The World's 50 Best Bars.
