= Tom Collins =

Cocktail made from gin, lemon juice, sugar and club soda

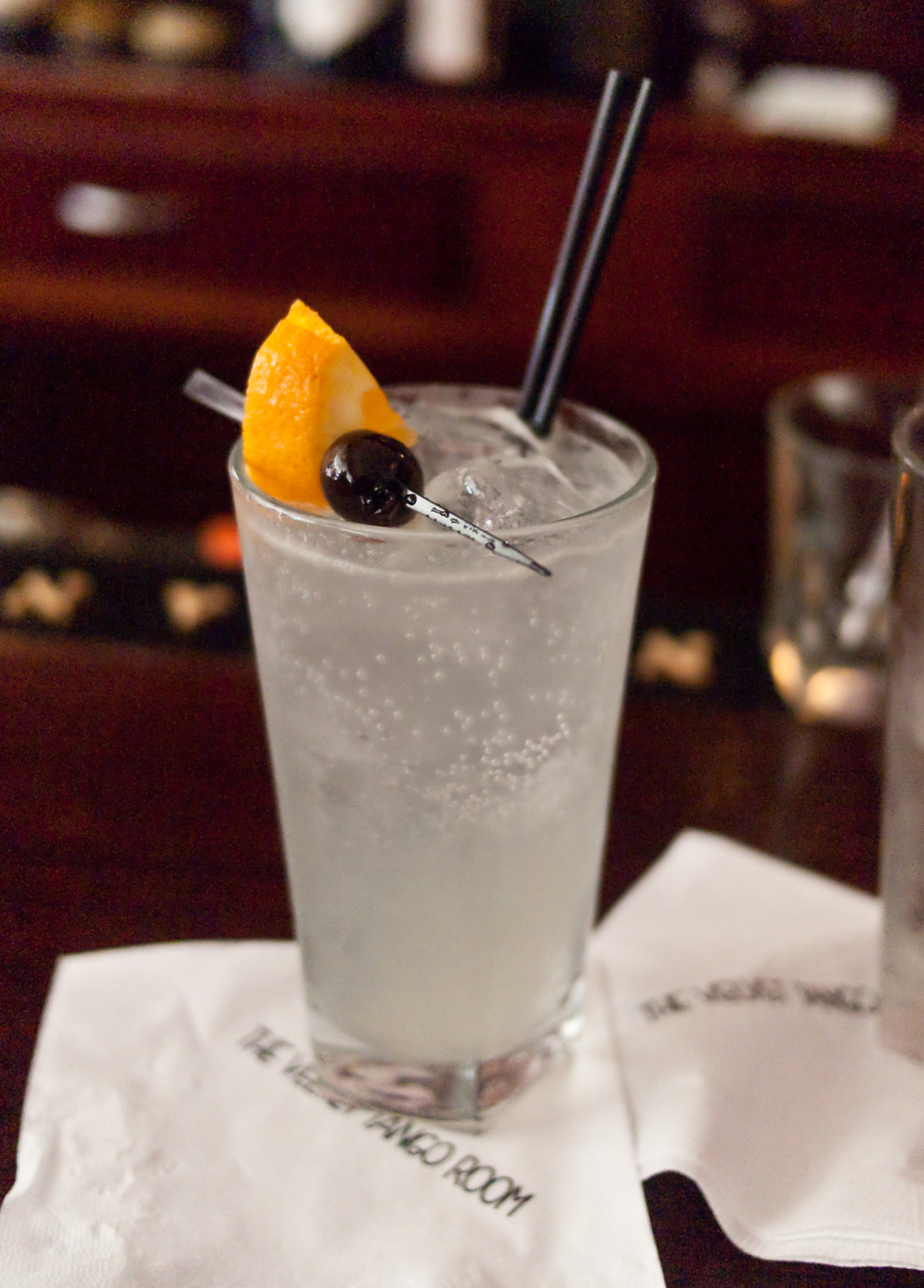
- Type: Highball
- Ingredients: 60 mL (2 US fl oz) Old Tom gin; 25 mL (0.8 US fl oz) lemon juice; 15 mL (0.5 US fl oz) simple syrup; 50 mL (1.7 US fl oz) club soda
- Base spirit: Gin
- Standard drinkware: Collins glass
- Standard garnish: Lemon slice and maraschino cherry
- Served: On the rocks: poured over ice
- Preparation: Mix the gin, lemon juice and sugar syrup in a tall glass with ice, top up with soda water, garnish and serve.

The Tom Collins is a Collins cocktail made from gin, lemon juice, sugar, and carbonated water. This "gin and sparkling lemonade" drink is typically served in a Collins glass over ice with a cherry garnish. A non-alcoholic "Collins mix" mixer is produced, enjoyed by some as a soft drink.

The drink is a variant of the similar John Collins.

== History ==
An August 1891 article from the British weekly magazine Punch disparaging British physician Sir Morell Mackenzie noting in August 1891 that the title of the song actually was "Jim Collins" and that Mackenzie otherwise inaccurately quoted and characterized the song.

The earliest publication of any Collins, as well as any Fizz recipe, are both located in the same book, American bartender and author Harry Johnson's 1882 Harry Johnson's New and Improved Bartender’s Manual, or How to Mix Drinks of the Present Style, in English and German. The book includes a Tom Collins calling for Old Tom gin and a John Collins calling for Holland Gin, most likely what is now known as Genièvre.

Johnson's recipe for Tom Collins from 1882 is as follows:

- 3/4 tsp (4 mL) of sugar
- 3 or 4 dashes of lime or lemon juice
- 3 or 4 pieces of broken ice
- 1 wine glass full of Old Tom gin
- 1 bottle of club soda
- Instructions: mix up well with a spoon, remove the ice, and serve. Attention must be paid not to let the foam of the soda water spread over the glass.

Cocktail historian David Wondrich stated that there are several other earlier mentions of this version of the drink and that it does bear a striking resemblance to the gin punches served at London clubs like the Garrick in the first half of the 19th century.

Clearly unaware of the drink's actual origins, in August 1891, British physician Sir Morell Mackenzie wrote an article in the influential 19th century magazine Fortnightly Review claiming that England was the originating country for the Tom Collins cocktail and a person named John Collins was its creator. In the article, Mackenzie quoted an old song called "John Collins". However, the British weekly magazine Punch immediately disparaged Mackenzie's efforts, noting in August 1891 that the title of the song actually was "Jim Collins" and that Mackenzie otherwise inaccurately quoted and characterized the song.

Confusion over the cocktail's origins continued as American writer Charles Montgomery Skinner noted in 1898 that the Tom Collins had made its way to the "American bars" in England, France, and Germany, where the American invention stimulated curiosity in Europe and served as a reflection of American art.

As time passed, interest in the Tom Collins diminished and its origins became lost. Early on, during the 1920s era of Prohibition in the United States, the American journalist and student of American English, H. L. Mencken, said:

The origin of the ... Tom-Collins ... remains to be established; the historians of alcoholism, like the philologists, have neglected them. But the essentially American character of [this and other drinks] is obvious, despite the fact that a number have gone over into English. The English, in naming their drinks, commonly display a far more limited imagination. Seeking a name, for example, for a mixture of whiskey and soda-water, the best they could achieve was "whiskey-and-soda". The Americans, introduced to the same drink, at once gave it the far more original name of "highball".

An alternate history of the Tom Collins places its origin in St. Louis (see under "Others" below).

=== John Collins ===
A drink known as a John Collins has existed since the 1860s at the very least. It is believed to have originated with a headwaiter of that name who worked at Limmer's Old House in Conduit Street in Mayfair, which was a popular London hotel and coffee house around 1790–1817.

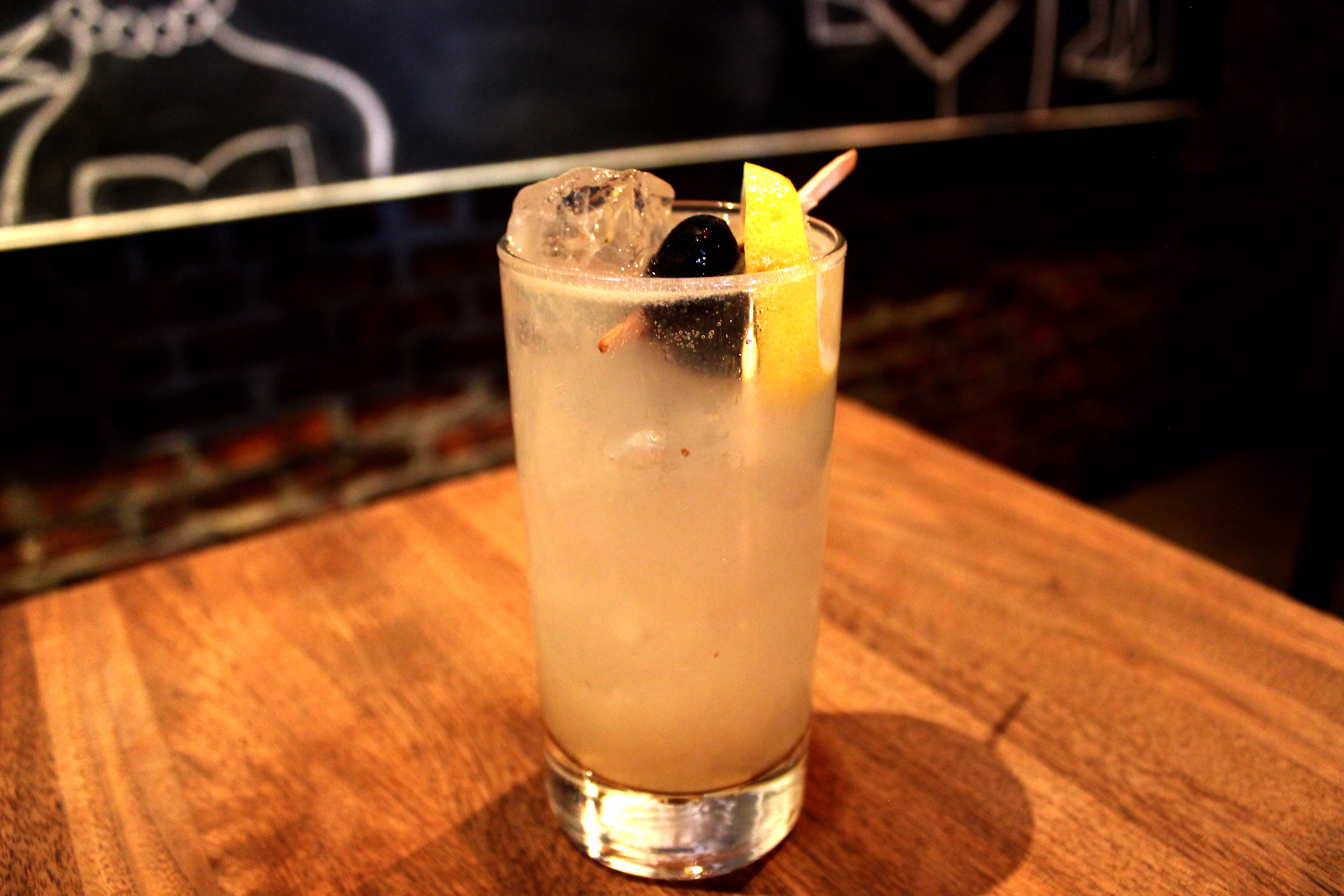
A Tom Collins served at Rye in San Francisco, California

The following rhyme was written by Frank and Charles Sheridan about John Collins:

My name is John Collins, head waiter at Limmer's,
Corner of Conduit Street, Hanover Square,
My chief occupation is filling brimmers
For all the young gentlemen frequenters there.

Drinks historian David Wondrich has speculated that the original recipe that was introduced to New York in the 1850s would have been very similar to the gin punches that are known to have been served at fashionable London clubs such as the Garrick during the first half of the 19th century. He states that these would have been along the lines of "gin, lemon juice, chilled soda water, and maraschino liqueur".

The specific call for Old Tom gin in the 1869 recipe is a likely cause for the subsequent name change to "Tom Collins" in Jerry Thomas's 1887 recipe. Earlier versions of the gin punch are likely to have used Dutch gin instead.

Some confusion regarding the origin of the drink and the cause for its change of name has arisen in the past due to the following:

=== The Tom Collins Hoax of 1874 ===
In 1874, people in New York; Pennsylvania; and elsewhere in the United States would start a conversation with, "Have you seen Tom Collins?" After the listener predictably reacts by explaining that they did not know a Tom Collins, the speaker would assert that Tom Collins was talking about the listener to others and that Tom Collins was "just around the corner", "in a [local] bar", or somewhere else near. The conversation about the nonexistent Tom Collins was a proven hoax of exposure. In The Great Tom Collins hoax of 1874, as it became known, the speaker would encourage the listener to act foolishly by reacting to patent nonsense that the hoaxer deliberately presents as reality. In particular, the speaker intended the listener to become agitated at the idea of someone talking about them to others such that the listener would rush off to find the purportedly nearby Tom Collins. Similar to the New York Zoo hoax of 1874, several newspapers propagated the very successful practical joke by printing stories containing false sightings of Tom Collins. The 1874 hoax quickly gained such notoriety that several 1874 music hall songs memorialized the event (copies of which are now in the U.S. Library of Congress).

=== Early recipes ===
The first published Tom Collins recipe appears to have been in Harry Johnson's 1882 book, New and Improved Bartender’s Manual or How to Mix Drinks of the Present Style. This book contains a recipe for two Collins drinks, the John Collins and the Tom Collins. The John Collins calls for Holland Gin, which is most likely what is also known as Genièvre, but the recipe for the Tom Collins in this book is as follows:

Tom Collins

(Use an extra large bar glass.) Three-quarters table-spoon of sugar; 3 or 4 dashes of lime or lemon juice; 3 or 4 pieces of broken ice; 1 wine glass full of Old Tom gin; 1 bottle of plain soda water; mix up well with a spoon, remove the ice, and serve.

Attention must be paid not to let the foam of the soda water spread over the glass.

In the 1884 book, The Modern Bartender’s Guide by O. H. Byron, there is a drink called a "John Collins' Gin" where he calls simply for gin with no specifications of which gin, lemon juice, sugar, and filled with soda. That book also has a "Tom Collins' Brandy", which consists of brandy, lemon juice, gum syrup and Maraschino liqueur, and filled with soda water built in the glass over ice. This book also lists a recipe for a "Tom Collins gin and whiskey", with the only instructions that it is "concocted in the same manner as a brandy receipt, substituting their respective liquors".

Another 1884 book, Scientific Barkeeping by E.N. Cook & Co, also includes both a John Collins and a Tom Collins, the former calling for Holland gin and the latter for whiskey. There is a recipe for the Tom Collins in the 1887 posthumous edition of Jerry Thomas' Bar-Tender's Guide. Since New York based Thomas would have known about the widespread hoax and the contents of his 1876 book were developed during or right after The Great Tom Collins hoax of 1874, it was believed by George Sinclair that the hoax event was the most plausible source of the name for the Tom Collins cocktail. Classified under the heading "Collins" with similarly named whisky and brandy drinks, Jerry Thomas' Tom Collins gin instructed:

Tom Collins (1887)

(Use large bar-glass.) Take 5 or 6 dashes of gum syrup. Juice of a small lemon. 1 large wine-glass of gin. 2 or 3 lumps of ice;

Shake up well and strain into a large bar-glass. Fill up the glass with plain soda water and drink while it is lively.

This was distinguished from the Gin Fizz cocktail in that the three dashes of lemon juice in the gin fizz was "fizzed" with carbonated water to essentially form a "gin and sodawater" whereas the considerably more "juice of a small lemon" in the Tom Collins essentially formed a "gin and sparkling lemonade" when sweetened with the gum syrup. The type of gin used by Thomas was not specified in his 1887 book, but was most likely Old Tom if that was responsible for the change in the drink's name.

=== Popularity ===
By 1878, the Tom Collins was being served in the barrooms of New York City and elsewhere. Identified as among 'the favorite drinks which are in demand everywhere' in an advertisement for the 1878 edition of The Modern Bartender's Guide by O. H. Byron, both Tom Collins gin and whiskey and Tom Collins brandy were considered fancy drinks. In the 1891 book, The Flowing Bowl: When and what to Drink, author William Schmidt listed the Tom Collins as including:

Tom Collins Gin (1891)
The juice of half a lemon in a large glass,
a bar-spoonful of sugar,
a drink of Tom gin; mix this well;
2 lumps of ice,
a bottle of plain soda.
Mix well and serve.

One turn-of-the-20th-century recipe subsequently replaced the lemon juice with lime juice.

=== Others ===
An alternate history places the origin in St. Louis.

== Modern mix ==
The 1986 The Book of Cocktails provides a modern take on Thomas' 1876 recipe for this long drink:

John (or Tom) Collins (1986)
ice cubes
2 oz. [6 cL] dry gin
2 oz. [6 cL] lemon juice
1 tsp [5 mL] sugar (gomme) syrup
soda water
slice of lemon
1 colored cherry
Place ample ice in large glass. Add gin, lemon juice and syrup. Top up with soda water and stir well. Serve with lemon slice, cherry and a straw.

== Variants ==
A simple Summer Collins is a two-ingredient cocktail consisting only of equal parts gin and lemonade, served over ice with an optional fruit garnish. The Vodka Collins uses vodka in place of gin. The South Side uses lime juice in addition to or in place of lemon and adds mint. A Rum Collins, also called a Ron Collins, uses light rum in place of gin and lime juice in place of lemon juice. A French 75 uses Champagne in lieu of soda water. The Juan Collins is made from tequila, lime juice, sugar or some other sweetening agent, and club soda. This drink typically is served in a Collins glass over ice.

== See also ==
- Collins glass
- Gin sour
- List of cocktails
