= Boker's Bitters =

American brand of bitters

Boker's Bitters was a brand of bitters manufactured by the L. J. Funke Company of New York City. The ingredient is specified in nearly every cocktail that called for bitters in Jerry Thomas' 1862 book, How to Mix Drinks or The Bon Vivant's Companion. Among the ingredients were quassia, cardamom, and bitter orange peel.

The Boker's company was a leading brand of bitters until the Pure Food and Drug Act of 1906 and eventually closed during the Prohibition era in the 1920s.

== History ==
Johann Gottlieb Böker created the bitters in 1828. The Boker's company was a leading brand of bitters until the Pure Food and Drug Act of 1906 and eventually closed during the Prohibition era in the 1920s.

Until 2009, no samples of the bitters were known to exist, and as the recipe had never been published, recreating it seemed unlikely. That year, a man showed up at the London Bar Show with a small remaining sample, which was then combined with extensive research (including interviewing descendants of John Boker), to recreate a facsimile of the bitters. Consequentially, as a result of the collaborative effort of beverage aficionados, the likely recipe began circulating online, and several well-established, modern bitters brands began offering their own renditions of the Boker's recipe — whether in perpetuity or as a one-off. Those brands include Philadelphia distillers, Dr. Adam Elmegirab, and The Bitter Truth.

== Cocktails with Boker’s Bitters ==
- Absinthe Cocktail
- Champagne Cocktail
- East India Cocktail
- Faivre's Pousse Cafe
- Fancy Brandy Cocktail
- Gin Cocktail
- Improved Cocktail
- Japanese Cocktail
- Jersey Cocktail
- Knickerbein
- Manhattan Cocktail
- Martinez
- Old Tom Gin Cocktail
- St. Croix Crusta
- Saratoga Cocktail
- Sherry Wine and Bitters
- Soda Cocktail
- Vermouth Cocktail
- Whiskey Cocktail
- Whiskey Crusta
