= Nathaniel Gubbins =

British journalist

- Born: 1893
- Died: 1976 (aged 82–83)
- Occupations: Journalist and humorist

Nathaniel Gubbins (1893–1976), born Norman Gubbins, was a British journalist and humorist.

As a boy he worked in the Daily Express archives; after he fought in World War I he was rehired as a reporter, but later was laid off. He worked as a freelancer and for the Daily Mirror.

From 1930 onwards he wrote a highly popular column in the Beaverbrook-owned Sunday Express called Sitting on the Fence. The column was particularly successful during the Second World War, and is associated with London's spirit during the Blitz by many. According to Time: "Once a week Nat Gubbins speaks for the British man-in-the-street better than the British man-in-the-street can speak for himself...Dry-eyed sentimentalist, sly humorist, casual reformer, recorder of mutton-headed remarks, he has become the most widely read of British columnists. He has no U.S. parallel."

Nathaniel aka Norman Gubbins is not to be confused with an earlier writer known as Nathaniel Gubbins, Edward Spencer Mott (1844–1910), author of Cakes and Ale, A Mingled Yarn, Pink Papers, Bits of Turf and The Flowing Bowl.
