= Cyprus brandy =

Brandy produced in Cyprus

Xynisteri grapes, as used to make brandy on Cyprus.

Cyprus brandy is a variety of brandy made on the Mediterranean island of Cyprus.

== History ==
The production of brandy on Cyprus began in 1871 under the leadership of winemaker Christodoulos Haggipavlu's sons Demetris and Demosthenis Haggipavlu. ETKO, the winemaking firm founded by the elder Haggipavlu in 1844, split into two subsidiaries in 1947, with ETKO Ltd focusing on the production of wines and Haggipavlu Co. focusing on the production of spirits.

Data coming from the English explorer Samuel Baker revealed that in 1875 the volume of "Rakı, or native Brandy" produced in the Limassol District alone amounted to 467,711 okes. Brandy production expanded during the administration of British Cyprus, and in 1928 there were seven distilleries on Cyprus: three at Limassol, three at Nicosia, and one at Larnaca. The average production of brandy for the five years ending in 1926 was 1,380,000 gallons. The popularity of Cyprus brandy increased due to its inclusion in the King's Christmas Pudding.

Disruption in trade during the formation of Northern Cyprus and a 1975 ban on Greek-Cypriot-produced brandy has resulted in brandy smuggling to the North.

== Distinguishing characteristics ==
Cypriot brandy continues to be widely distilled, particularly in the Limassol district. Unlike most European brandies, Cyprus brandies tend to be around 32% alcohol by volume, slightly lower than the 36% European standard. In 2001, European Union authorities demanded changes to brandy production in Cyprus if the product were to continue being labeled as "brandy" in the EU. Some Cyprus brandies are stronger, such as KEO Five Kings at 40%. Cyprus brandies possess a characteristic sweetish tinge with a lingering aftertaste.

Cyprus brandy is typically produced by double distillation of xynisteri-based white wines; the xynisteri grapes are indigenous to the island of Cyprus.

== Use in mixed drinks ==
Cypriot brandy forms the base for the brandy sour cocktail, which was legendarily invented when King Farouk of Egypt visited Cyprus and desired a drink that would visually resemble nonalcoholic iced tea. It is considered the national cocktail of Cyprus.

== See also ==
- Zivania
