= Imbibe! =

2007 book by David Wondrich

- Author: David Wondrich
- Language: English
- Publisher: Perigee Books; Penguin Random House
- Publication date: November 2007, 1st ed; 2015, 2nd ed
- Publication place: United States
- ISBN: 1436277000

Imbibe! is a book by the cocktail historian David Wondrich. It was first published in November 2007 by Perigee Books.

== Synopsis ==
The book is intended as a follow up to Jerry Thomas' 1862 book How to Mix Drinks, or The Bon Vivant's Companion. The life of Thomas, as well as various celebrity bartenders who preceded him, is also explored in the book. The book describes the history of American bar culture, as well as the development of the mixed drink. Included are numerous recipes for cocktails from Thomas' book, and their historical origins as well as more modern additions.

== Reception ==
The book received generally positive reviews, and became extremely popular after its publication. It was featured in publications such as The Washington Post, GrubStreet, Wine & Spirits, New York, and Wine Enthusiast.

A revised edition featuring additional recipes expanded historical backgrounds was published by Perigee and Penguin Random House in 2015.
