= Long drink =

Alcoholic mixed drink with a relatively large volume

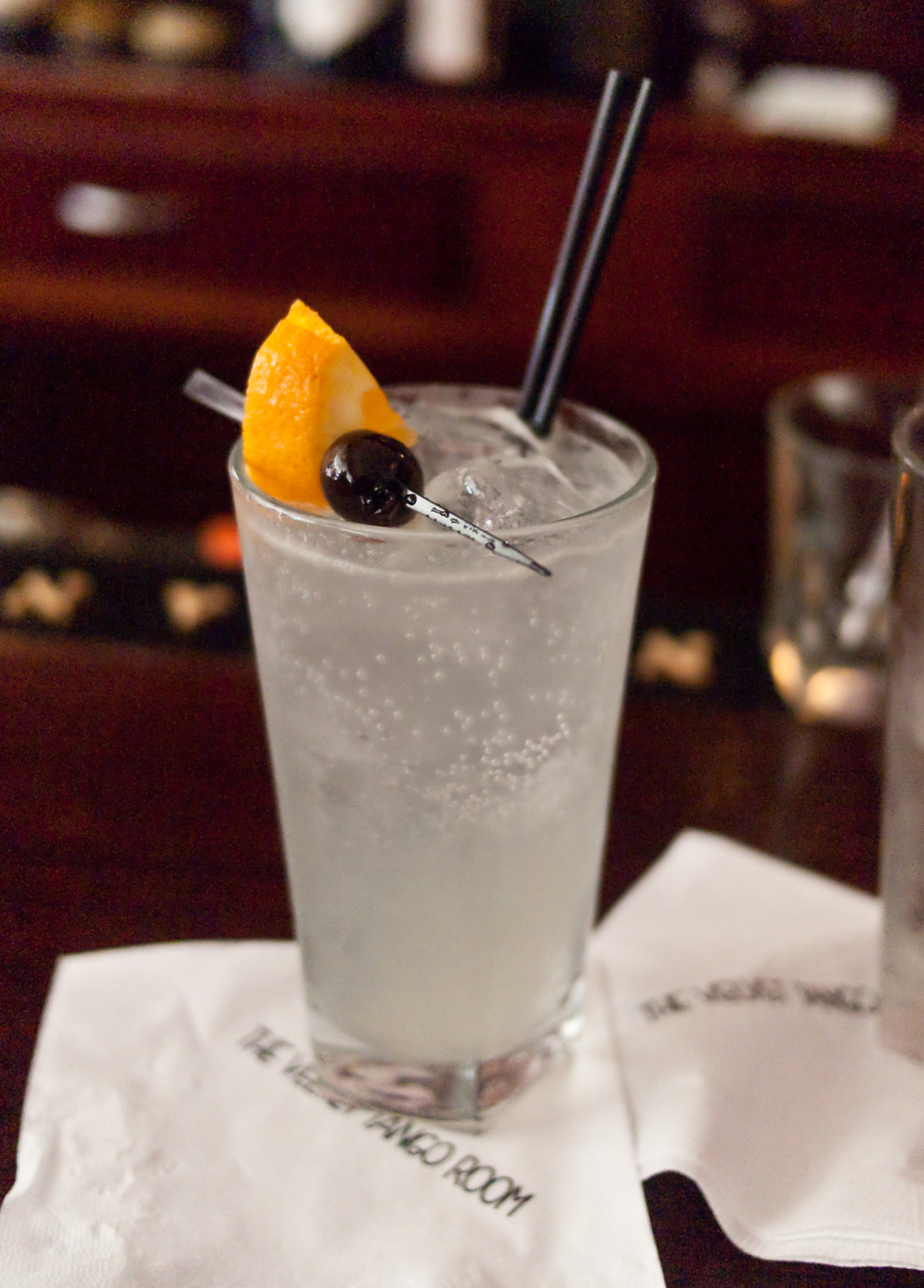
A classic long drink, the Tom Collins

A long drink or tall drink is an alcoholic mixed drink with a volume of more than 120 ml (4.1 US fl oz), frequently 160–400 ml (5.4–13.5 US fl oz). The phrase "long drink" is also sometimes used to refer specifically to the Finnish long drink, also known as a lonkero.

A long drink typically has a high proportion of mixer, whereas a short drink (or shooter) contains less mixer, or none. Short drinks are generally stronger, since both types tend to contain a similar total amount of alcohol per drink.

A classic long drink is a Tom Collins. A simple style of long drink is the highball, a cocktail composed of one liquor and one mixer (excluding garnish or ice). A classic example of the highball is the Scotch and soda.

== Finnish long drink ==
In Finland, long drink (in Finnish lonkero) refers to a very popular mixed drink made from gin and a mixer, traditionally grapefruit soda, though many other flavours (almost always fruit) are available. It is ubiquitously available in Finnish stores, bars, and restaurants, and has more recently started becoming available in international markets.

== See also ==
- drink can § Standard sizes
