= Old Tom gin =

18th century gin recipe

Old Tom gin (or Tom gin or Old Tom) is a gin recipe popular in 18th-century England. In modern times, it became rare but has experienced a resurgence in the craft cocktail movement. It is slightly sweeter than London dry gin, but slightly drier than the Dutch Jenever; it is thus sometimes called "the missing link".

The name Old Tom gin purportedly came from wooden plaques shaped like a black cat (an "Old Tom") mounted on the outside wall of some pubs above a public walkway in 18th-century England. Owing to the Gin Craze, the British government tried to stem the flow of gin with prohibitive taxes and licensing, which drove the scene underground. Under the cat's paw sign was a slot to put money into and a lead tube. From the tube would come a shot of gin, poured by the bartender inside the pub.

Old Tom gin was formerly made under licence by a variety of distillers around the world; however, one was recently relaunched by Hayman's Distillery based on an original recipe. Since then a number of other companies have followed suit, such as Booth's; Secret Treasures; The Liberty Distillery; Tanqueray; Langley's; Jensens; Ransom; Master of Malt; The Dorchester Hotel; The London Distillery Company Ltd; Cotswolds Distillery, and Sacred Spirits.

An Old Tom gin made by J. Wray and Nephew Ltd. of Jamaica is also commonly found on the market.

Old Tom gin is specified for Jerry Thomas' cocktail called the Martinez in his 1887 Bartender's Guide, How to Mix All Kinds of Plain and Fancy Drinks. An early record of it being used in the Tom Collins cocktail was the 1882 book, Harry Johnson's New and Improved Bartender's Manual.

== See also ==
- Tom Collins
