= Scotch and soda =

Cocktail

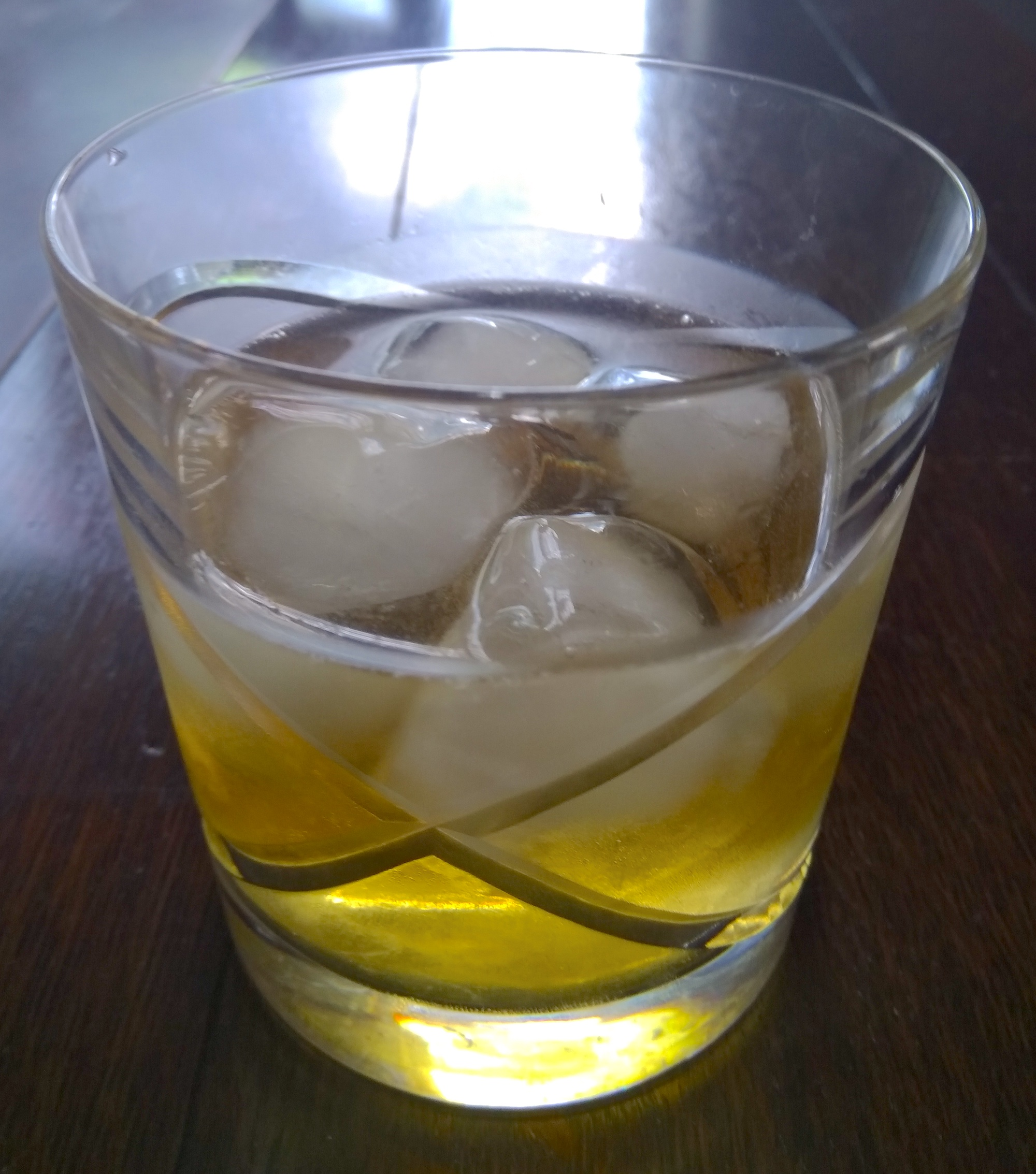
- Scotch and soda (made approximately in ratio 1:2), served with ice
- Type: Highball
- Ingredients: Scotch whisky and carbonated water
- Standard drinkware: Old fashioned glass
- Preparation: Measure whisky into glass (with or without ice), top with water as desired

Scotch and soda is a mixed drink consisting of Scotch whisky and soda water or other sparkling water.

There is no fixed ratio of the ingredients: the amount of water can vary according to taste from a splash to several times that of the whisky. The drink can be variously served with or without ice, and sometimes also with a simple garnish such as a citrus twist.

The glassware used can be any of the tumbler type, most commonly either old fashioned or highball glass. The latter, being larger, is used especially when adding ice or a relatively larger quantity of water.

== Using other whiskies ==
Similar whisky-and-soda drinks can be made with other whiskies and will have largely similar characteristics. The generic name is whisky soda (or whisky and soda).

In Japan, whisky and soda, typically made of Suntory Kakubin, is synonymous with highball.

A stengah is a drink made from equal measures of whisky and soda water, served over ice. In the early 20th century, it was a popular drink among British subjects in areas of the British Empire in Asia. The term derives from the Malay word for "half" (setengah).

== See also ==
- List of cocktails
