= Jerry Thomas (bartender) =

American bartender (1830–1885)

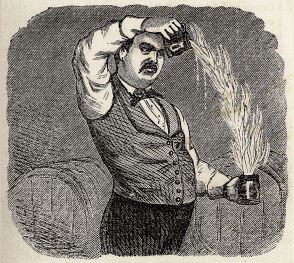
- Thomas mixing his signature drink, The Blue Blazer
- Born: October 30, 1830; Sackets Harbor, New York, U.S.
- Died: December 15, 1885 (aged 55); New York City, U.S.
- Occupation: Bartender

Jeremiah P. Thomas (October 30, 1830 – December 15, 1885) was an American bartender who owned and operated saloons in New York City. Because of his pioneering work in popularizing cocktails across the United States as well, he is considered "the father of American mixology". In addition to writing the seminal work on cocktails, Bar-Tender's Guide, Thomas displayed creativity and showmanship while preparing drinks and established the image of the bartender as a creative professional. As such, he was often nicknamed "Professor" Jerry Thomas.

== Early life, education and work ==
Thomas was born about 1830 in Sackets Harbor, New York. (His 1885 obituary in the New York Times said 1832.) As a young man, he learned bartending in New Haven, Connecticut, before sailing for California during its mid-19th century Gold Rush. While in California, Thomas worked as a bartender, gold prospector and minstrel show manager. According to his 1885 obituary, he was left some money by his father, which helped in these travels.

== Saloon keeper and bartender ==
Thomas moved back to the East Coast in 1851, settling in New York City. He opened a saloon below Barnum's American Museum; it would be the first of four saloons he would run in New York City over his lifetime. After running this first bar, Thomas went on the road for several years, working as the head bartender at hotels and saloons in St. Louis, Missouri; Chicago, Illinois; San Francisco, California; Virginia City, Nevada; Charleston, South Carolina; and New Orleans, Louisiana. At one point he toured Europe, carrying along a set of solid-silver bar tools. He was well known for his showmanship as a bartender; he developed elaborate and flashy techniques of mixing cocktails, sometimes while juggling bottles, cups and mixers. He often wore flashy jewelry and had his bar tools and cups embellished with precious stones and metals. At the Occidental Hotel in San Francisco, Thomas was earning $100 a week—more than the Vice President of the United States.

=== Bar-Tender's Guide ===
In 1862, Thomas finished Bar-Tender's Guide (alternately titled How to Mix Drinks or The Bon-Vivant's Companion), the first drink book ever published in the United States. The book collected and codified what was then an oral tradition of recipes from the early days of cocktails, including some of his own creations; the guide laid down the principles for formulating mixed drinks of all categories. He would update it several times in his lifetime to include new drinks that he discovered or created. The first edition of the guide included the first written recipes of such cocktails as the Fizz, Flip, Sour and variations of the earliest form of mixed drink, Punch. The 1876 edition included the first written recipes for the Tom Collins, which appeared just after The Tom Collins Hoax of 1874, and one of the earliest known recipes for the Brandy Daisy.

=== Virginia City, Nevada ===
From "IMBIBE !" by David Wondrich:

The fortunes of Thomas' book were likely affected by the Professor's next move: rather than stay at the Occidental (SF), where he could have passed the volume along to the steady stream of clay-moistening literati who stopped in at his bar, he pulled up stakes yet again and headed east to witness the vast and vulgar spectacle that was unfolding 200 miles away in Virginia City, Nevada where a city of 30,000 had sprung up overnight on top of the massive mountain of silver known as the Comstock Lode. By 1864, Thomas was there, either (as local legend has it) at the famous Delta Saloon or at the Spalding Saloon on C Street, where the city directory found him- or, of course, at both.

==== Sign located to the right of entrance doors of the Delta Saloon in Virginia City, Nevada ====
Nunc Est Bibendum

Head Bartender at the Delta Saloon in 1863 was Prof. Jerry Thomas, most celebrated barman in American history. Coming to Virginia City, according to the Territorial Enterprise** of that year, from the Occidental in San Francisco, he did much to elevate the tastes and drinking habits of the then uncouth Comstock.

** Territorial Enterprise newspaper (Samuel Clemens, aka Mark Twain, reporter)

=== San Francisco and the Blue Blazer ===
Thomas developed his signature drink, the Blue Blazer, at the El Dorado gambling saloon in San Francisco. The drink is made by lighting whiskey afire and passing it back and forth between two mixing glasses, creating an arc of flame. Thomas continued to develop new drinks throughout his life. His mixing of the "Martinez", which recipe was published in the 1887 edition of his guide, has sometimes been viewed as a precursor to the modern martini. Thomas claimed to have invented the Tom and Jerry and did much to popularize it in the United States; however, the history of the drink predated him.

=== In New York City ===
Upon returning to New York City, he became head bartender at the Metropolitan hotel. In 1866 he opened his own bar again, on Broadway between 21st and 22nd Streets, which became his most famous establishment. Thomas was one of the first to display the drawings of Thomas Nast. In his saloon he hung Nast's caricatures of the political and theatrical figures; one notable drawing, now lost, was of Thomas "in nine tippling postures colossally." The saloon included funhouse mirrors. This historic bar has been adapted for use as a Restoration Hardware store.

Thomas was an active man about town, a flashy dresser who was fond of kid gloves and his gold Parisian watch. He enjoyed going to bare-knuckle prize fights, and was an art collector. He enjoyed traveling. By middle age he was married and had two daughters. Always a good sport, at 205 pounds he was one of the lighter members of the Fat Men's Association. He had a side interest in gourds; at one point in the late 1870s, Thomas served as president of The Gourd Club after producing the largest specimen.

=== Later years and death ===
Toward the end of his life, Thomas tried speculating on Wall Street, but bad judgments rendered him broke. He had to sell his successful saloon and auction off his considerable art collection; he tried opening a new bar but was unable to maintain the level of popularity as his more famous location. He died in New York City of a stroke (apoplexy) in 1885 at the age of 55. His death was marked by substantial obituaries across the United States. The New York Times obituary noted that Thomas was "at one time better known to club men and men about town than any other bartender in this city, and he was very popular among all classes." He is interred at Woodlawn Cemetery in the Bronx, New York City.

== Sites today ==
- The Delta Saloon, Virginia City, Nevada
- Occidental Cigar Club, San Francisco: "While the Occidental Cigar Club was established in 2001, its roots go far back in San Francisco history to the 1860's and The Occidental Hotel. This "Quiet House of Peculiar Excellence" was the first real cocktail lounge in the City. Principal Barman Professor Jerry Thomas plied his trade there and was the originator of the Martini. The first bi-coastal celebrity bartender, he brought civility to the bar scene as well as creativity to mixology. The wood cut etchings found in his book, The Bon Vivant's Companion or How To Mix Drinks adorn our walls, and his spirit is embodied in the drinks we pour today. The Occidental Cigar Club pays homage to that San Francisco institution."
- The Jerry Thomas Speakeasy, Rome, Italy

== Bibliography ==
Thomas is known to have authored two books: How to Mix Drinks, or The Bon-Vivant's Companion (originally published in 1862, with new and updated editions in 1876, and again posthumously in 1887) and Portrait Gallery of Distinguished Bar-Keepers (originally published in 1867 and considered a lost book).

The titles of the books are organized by their outside cover titles / inside cover titles.

- How to Mix Drinks / How to Mix Drinks, or The Bon-Vivant's Companion (Dick & Fitzgerald Publishers, 1862)
- Portrait Gallery of Distinguished Bar-Keepers (1867)
- How to Mix Drinks (1876)
- Jerry Thomas' Bar-Tenders Guide / The Bar-Tender's Guide, or How to Mix All Kinds of Plain and Fancy Drinks - An Entirely New and Enlarged Edition (Fitzgerald Publishing Corporation, 1887)

== Legacy and honors ==
- March 2003, a tribute was held for Jerry Thomas at the Oak Room at the Plaza Hotel in New York City, where bartenders gathered to make the many cocktails published in his books. The event was organized by David Wondrich, author of Esquire Drinks and a later biography of Thomas, and Slow Food, the organization devoted to traditional preparations of food.
- Thomas is featured in the exhibits of the Museum of the American Cocktail, founded in 2004.
- Cocktail writer David Wondrich wrote Imbibe! about Jerry Thomas and his cocktail recipes. In 2008, it became the first cocktail book to win a James Beard Award.
- The Jerry Thomas Speakeasy opened in Rome, Italy, is named for the bartender.
- Bitter Truth bottles and sells Jerry Thomas' Own Decanter Bitters using the bartender's original recipe.
- Del Professore gin from Italy is named in Jerry Thomas' honour https://www.delprofessore.com/gin/
- The Delta Saloon continues to operate in Virginia City, Nevada.
