= Brandy daisy =

Cocktail

- Type: Cocktail
- Ingredients: 1½ ounces brandy; ¾ ounce yellow Chartreuse; ¾ ounce lemon juice
- Standard drinkware: Champagne coupe
- Served: straight up (without ice)
- Preparation: Shake with ice in a cocktail shaker, then strain into a chilled Coupe glass and top with a splash of chilled club soda or seltzer.

The brandy daisy is a cocktail which first gained popularity in the late 19th century. One of the earliest known recipes was published in 1876 in the second edition of Jerry Thomas's The Bartenders Guide or How to Mix Drinks: The Bon-Vivants Companion:

- 3 or 4 dashes gum syrup
- 2 or 3 dashes of Curaçao liqueur
- The juice of half a lemon
- 1 small wineglass of brandy

Fill glass half full of shaved ice. Shake well and strain into a glass, and fill up with Seltzer water from a syphon.

Other daisies with base spirits such as whiskey or gin instead of brandy were also included in the guide. Over the years, additional variations were developed. The gin-based daisy, in at least one bartender's guide from the mid-1930s, is considered an early incarnation of the Cosmopolitan, a drink today well known as a citrus vodka-based concoction. Fresh citrus – typically lemon juice, but occasionally orange or lime juice – is common throughout most daisy recipes. Liqueurs or cordials also figure prominently, ranging from Curaçao to maraschino or yellow Chartreuse (a suggestion from the writer Nathaniel Gubbins in his 1899 book The Flowing Bowl), distinguishing the daisy from other sour cocktails. Additional sweeteners sometimes added range from gomme syrup to grenadine syrup, raspberry syrup, or bar sugar.

A later recipe, published in 1941 in Old Mr Boston's De Luxe Official Bartender's Book includes the following instructions:

- 2 oz California brandy
- juice of ½ lemon
- 1 tsp raspberry syrup or grenadine
- ½ tsp powdered sugar
- fill cracked ice

Shake well with cracked ice and strain into stein or 8 oz. metal cup. Add cube of ice and decorate with fruit.

The daisy was the forerunner to other popular cocktails, notably the sidecar, from around the end of World War I, and the margarita, during the late 1930s and early 1940s. Even as the margarita has become especially popular during the late 20th and early 21st centuries, its base spirit has also surfaced in both tequila daisies and sidecars.
