= Fizz (cocktail) =

Type of carbonated alcoholic mixed drinks

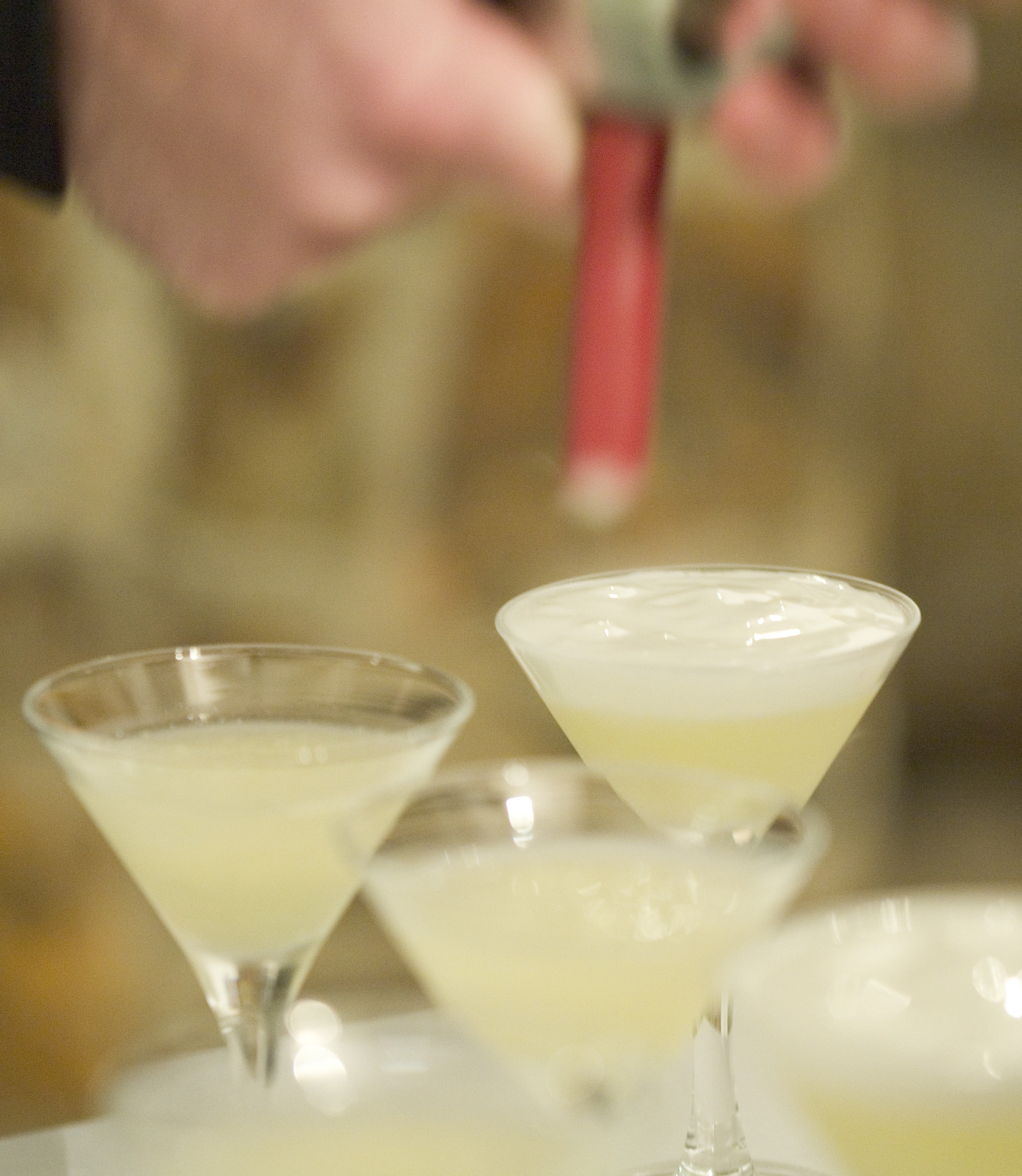
- Type: Cocktail family
- Base spirit: Gin, Whiskey, Rum

A "fizz" is a mixed drink variation on the older sours family of cocktail. Its defining features are an acidic juice (such as lemon or lime) and carbonated water. It typically includes gin or rum as its alcoholic ingredient.

== History ==
The fizz became widely popular in America between 1900 and the 1940s. Known as a hometown specialty of New Orleans, the gin fizz was so popular that bars would employ teams of bartenders that would take turns shaking the drinks. Demand for fizzes went international at least as early as 1950, as evidenced by its inclusion in the French cookbook L'Art Culinaire Francais published that year.

== Gin fizz ==
Gin fizz
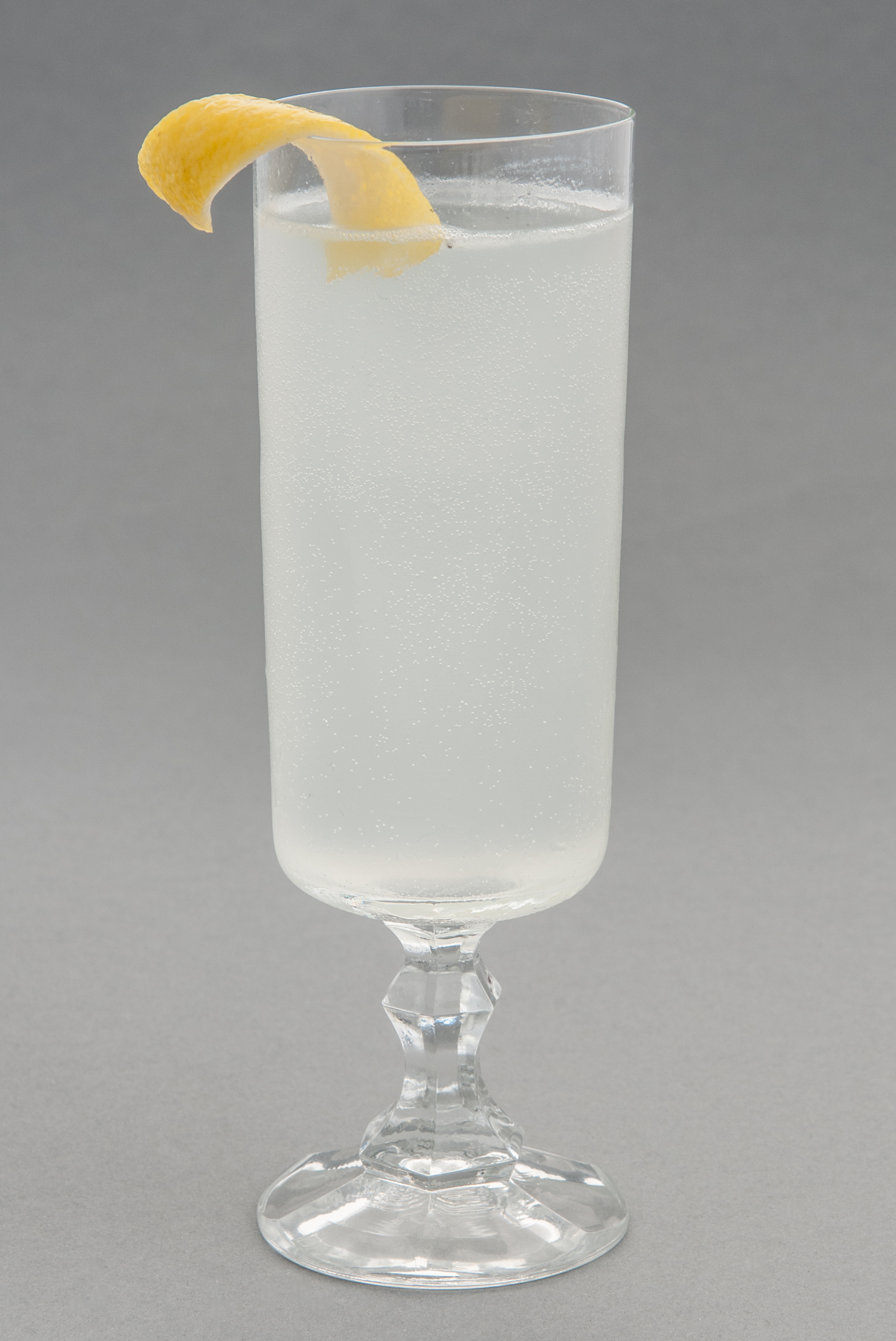
- Type: Cocktail
- Ingredients: 5 cl gin; 3 cl fresh lemon juice; 1 cl simple syrup; Splash of soda water
- Base spirit: Gin
- Standard drinkware: Old fashioned glass
- Standard garnish: lemon slice
- Served: Straight up: chilled, without ice
- Preparation: Shake all ingredients with ice cubes, except soda water. Pour into glass. Top with soda water.

A gin fizz is the best-known cocktail in the fizz family. A gin fizz contains gin, lemon juice, and sugar, which are shaken with ice, poured into a tumbler and topped with carbonated water. The drink is similar to a Tom Collins, with a possible distinction being a Tom Collins historically used "Old Tom gin" (a slightly sweeter precursor to London Dry Gin), whereas the kind of gin historically used in a gin fizz is unknown.

Simple variations on the gin fizz are

- Silver fizz – addition of egg white
- Golden fizz – addition of egg yolk
- Royal fizz – addition of whole egg
- Diamond fizz – sparkling wine instead of carbonated water, more commonly known as a "French 75".
- Green fizz – addition of a dash of green crème de menthe

== Ramos gin fizz ==
Ramos gin fizz
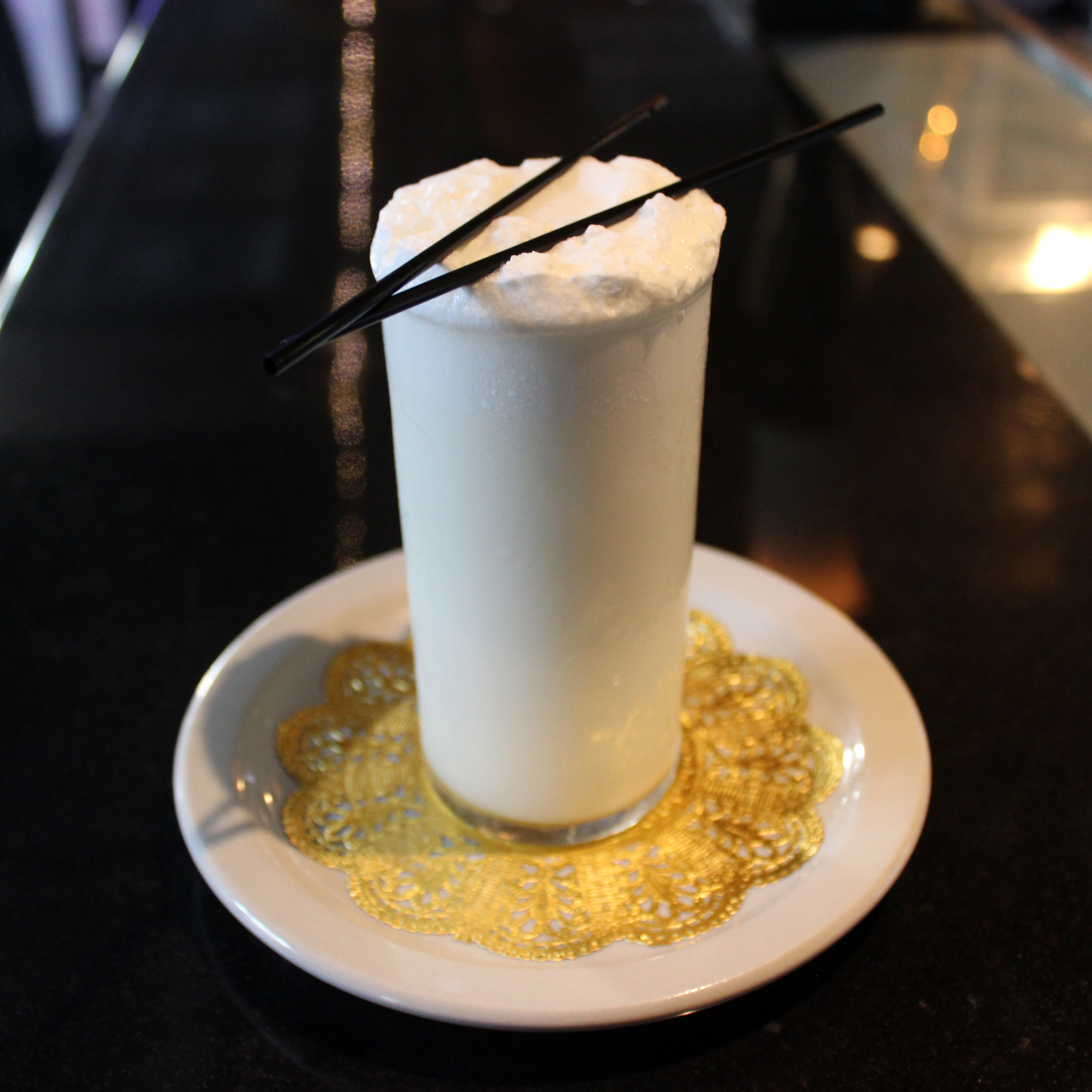
- Ramos gin fizz at a bar in New Orleans
- Type: Cocktail
- Ingredients: 4.5 cl gin; 1.5 cl fresh lime juice; 1.5 cl fresh lemon juice; 3 cl simple syrup; 6 cl cream; 1 egg white; 3 dashes orange flower water; 2 drops vanilla extract; soda water
- Base spirit: Gin
- Standard drinkware: Collins glass
- Served: Straight up: chilled, without ice
- Preparation: All ingredients except the soda are poured in a mixing glass, dry shaken (no ice) for two minutes, then ice is added and shaken hard for another minute. Strain into a highball glass without ice and topped with soda.

A Ramos gin fizz (also known as a "Ramos fizz" or "New Orleans fizz") contains gin, lemon juice, lime juice, egg white, sugar, cream, orange flower water, and soda water. It is served in a large non-tapered 12-to-14-US-fluid-ounce (350 to 410 ml) Collins glass.

The orange flower water and egg significantly affect the flavor and texture of a Ramos, compared to a regular gin fizz. The key to making this egg cocktail is dissolving the sugar before adding ice; the sugar acts as an emulsifier, and it and the alcohol "cook" the egg white.

Henry C. Ramos invented the Ramos gin fizz in 1888 at his bar, the Imperial Cabinet Saloon on Gravier Street, New Orleans, Louisiana. It was originally called a "New Orleans fizz", and is one of the city's most famous cocktails. Before Prohibition, the drink's popularity and exceptionally long 12-minute mixing time had over 20 bartenders working at the Imperial at once making nothing but the Ramos gin fizz – and still struggling to keep up with demand. During the carnival of 1915, 32 staff members were on at once, just to shake the drink.

The Roosevelt Hotel in New Orleans also popularized the drink, abetted by Governor Huey Long's fondness for it. In July 1935, Long brought a bartender named Sam Guarino from the Roosevelt Hotel to the New Yorker Hotel in New York City to teach its staff how to make the drink so he could have it whenever he was there. The Museum of the American Cocktail has newsreel footage of this event. The Roosevelt Hotel group trademarked the drink name in 1935 and still makes it today.

== Sloe gin fizz (purple fizz) ==
Sloe gin fizz
- Type: Cocktail
- Ingredients: 6 cl sloe gin; 3 cl fresh grapefruit juice; 1 cl simple syrup; 8 cl soda water; 1 egg white (optional)
- Standard drinkware: Highball glass
- Standard garnish: grapefruit slice, maraschino cherry
- Served: On the rocks: poured over ice
- Preparation: Shake all ingredients with ice cubes, except soda water. Pour into glass. Top with soda water.

A traditional sloe gin fizz contains sloe gin (a blackthorn plum flavored spirit), grapefruit juice, simple syrup, egg white, and carbonated water. A popular alternative eliminates the egg white. Though the original recipe uses grapefruit juice, variants including lemon juice exist as well.

== Less common gin fizzes ==
- Japanese gin fizz – a standard gin fizz with a shot of lychee liqueur added
- Kaikan fizz – normal gin fizz added with milk. Also known as "Morning Fizz".
- Meyer lemon fizz – uses the sweeter Meyer lemon instead of normal lemon, and adds orange juice
- New Orleans "fiss" – 75% dry gin, 25% Creme Yvette, 1 egg white, 1/2 tsp. powdered sugar, 1 tsp. cream, juice each of 1/2 of an orange, lime, & lemon
- Sour melon fizz – gin, lime juice, midori and ginger ale
- Strawberry gin fizz – gin, St. Germain liqueur, strawberries, club soda, mint; or gin, lime juice, sparkling water, mint sprigs
- Tillhammer – gin, Spezi, a frozen dill pickle

== Non-gin fizzes ==
- Chicago fizz – rum, port wine, lemon juice, sugar, and egg white
- Manhattan cooler – whisky (Scotch), lemon juice, sugar, and lemon-lime soda
- Mimosa (or Buck's fizz)IBA – champagne, orange juice, sometimes grenadine
- Pink fizz (or May blossom fizz) – Swedish punsch, lemon juice, grenadine, soda water
- Morning glory fizz – whisky (Scotch), absinthe, lemon juice, one egg white, sugar, soda water
- Whiskey fizz – whiskey (American blend), lemon juice, sugar, and lemon-lime soda
- Vodka fizz - vodka (plain or flavored), fruit juice, and sparkling water or soda
- Mojito – white rum, sugar, lime juice, soda water, and mint.

== See also ==
- List of cocktails with gin
