= Sheppard Bone-Dry Act =

1917 Ban on alcoholic beverages in Columbia's district

- Long title: An Act to prevent the manufacture and sale of alcoholic liquors in the District of Columbia, and for other purposes.
- Nicknames: District of Columbia Prohibition Act
- Enacted by: the 64th United States Congress
- Effective: March 3, 1917

Citations
- Public law: 64-383
- Statutes at Large: 39 Stat. 1123

Legislative history
- Introduced in the Senate as S. 1082 by Morris Sheppard (D-TX) on February 11, 1916; Passed the Senate on January 9, 1917 (59-34); Passed the House on February 28, 1917 (276-143); Signed into law by President Woodrow Wilson on March 3, 1917

The Sheppard Bone-Dry Act, sponsored by Sen. Morris Sheppard (D) of Texas, was passed by the US Congress in 1917. It imposed a ban on alcoholic beverages in the District of Columbia. The act prohibited alcohol production and sales but included exceptions for religious and medical use. It was a precursor to the 18th Amendment, which Sheppard also championed, leading to national Prohibition in 1920. The term “bone-dry” refers to its strict prohibition measures, reflecting Sheppard’s temperance advocacy. The act remained in effect until Prohibition’s repeal in 1933.
