= Tall glass =

Glass tumbler used to serve mixed drinks

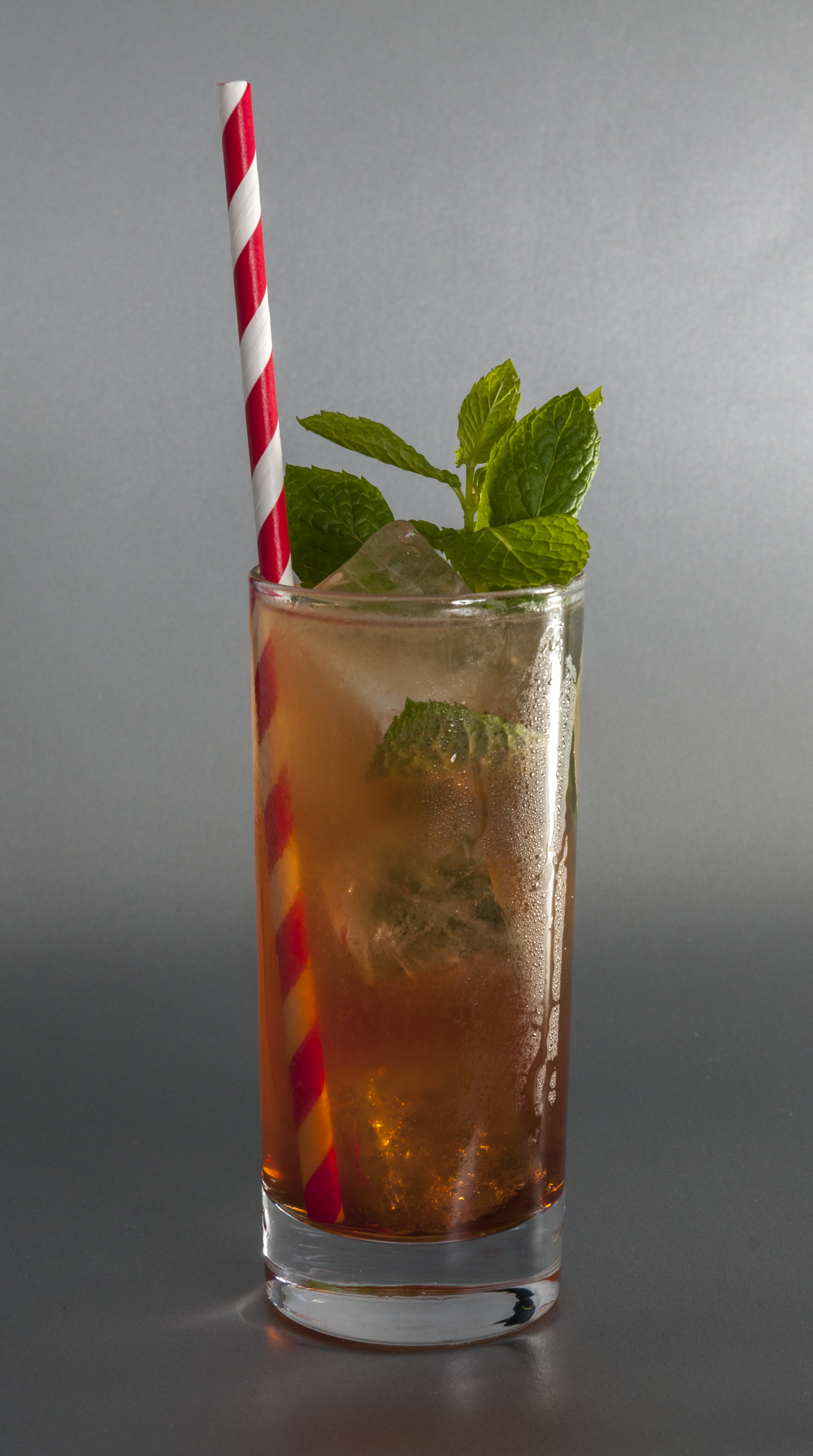
- Mojito served in a Collins glass
- Type: Tumbler
- Other names: Chimney glass; Collins glass; Highball glass; Fizz glass
- Introduced: 1870s

A tall glass is a variety of tumbler intended for bubbly mixed drinks, particularly long drinks. A traditional bar glass, it is flat-bottomed with a thin, minimally tapered or perpendicular wall. Large and small tall glasses are called a Collins glass and highball glass respectively, for their respective eponymous cocktails, the Collins and the highball (the latter as opposed to a lowball glass). The fizz glass is an archaic, further smaller tall glass for fizzes.

A tall glass of 10–12 US fluid ounces (300–350 ml) can be used interchangeably as a Collins glass or highball glass: a Collins glass typically holds about 10–14 US fluid ounces (300–410 ml), whilst a highball glass may hold about 8–12 US fluid ounces (240–350 ml). In some bars, a tall glass may be replaced with the readily available pint glass. The tall Collins glass or chimney glass is a larger 16 US fluid ounces (470 ml) glass used for large cocktails like the Singapore sling or Zombie.

== History ==
The tall glass was introduced in the 1870s to keep carbonated mixed drinks fizzy for longer, owing to its narrow shape. The larger Collins glass and the 6 US fluid ounces (180 ml) fizz glass came about first, with the highball glass arriving as a go-between size in the 1890s.

The gin and tonic is typically served in a tall glass in the Anglosphere. In early 21st century Spain, the tall glass has been increasingly swapped for a large balloon glass (Spanish: copa de balón) for gin and tonic (gintonic); the alternate choice of glass has been introduced to Britain from British tourism to Spain.
