= List of IBA official cocktails =

International Bartenders Association cocktails

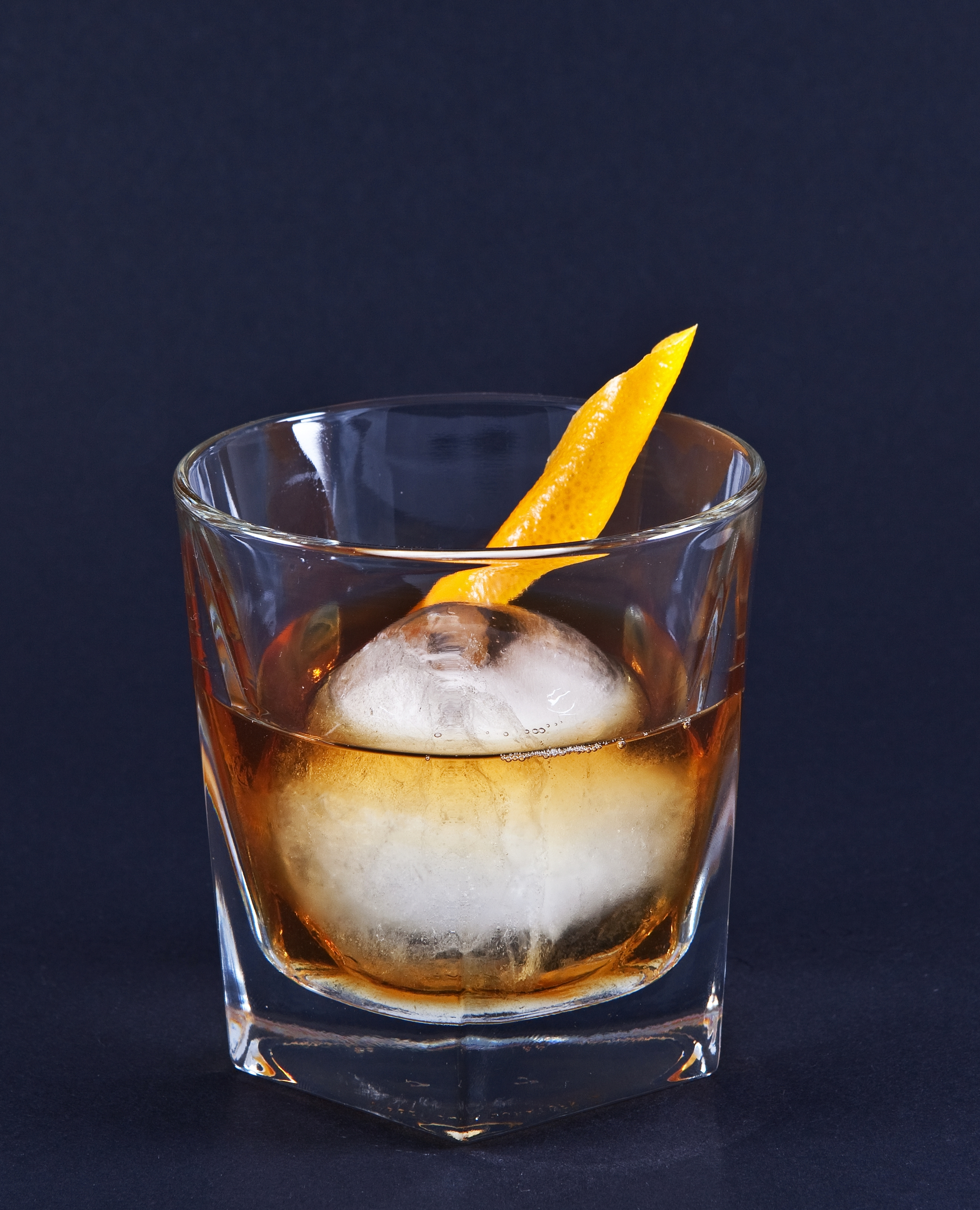
The old fashioned is an IBA official cocktail in the "Unforgettables" category.

The IBA official cocktails are cocktails recognised by the International Bartenders Association (IBA) to be the most requested recipes. The list was developed starting in 1960, and the first version was announced in 1961, comprising 50 cocktails. It has since undergone periodic revisions, and as of 2026 comprises 102 cocktails in 3 categories; see § History for more.

== List of cocktails ==
As of 2024, there are 102 IBA official cocktails, divided into three equal categories of 34: The Unforgettables, Contemporary Classics, and New Era Drinks.

=== The Unforgettables ===
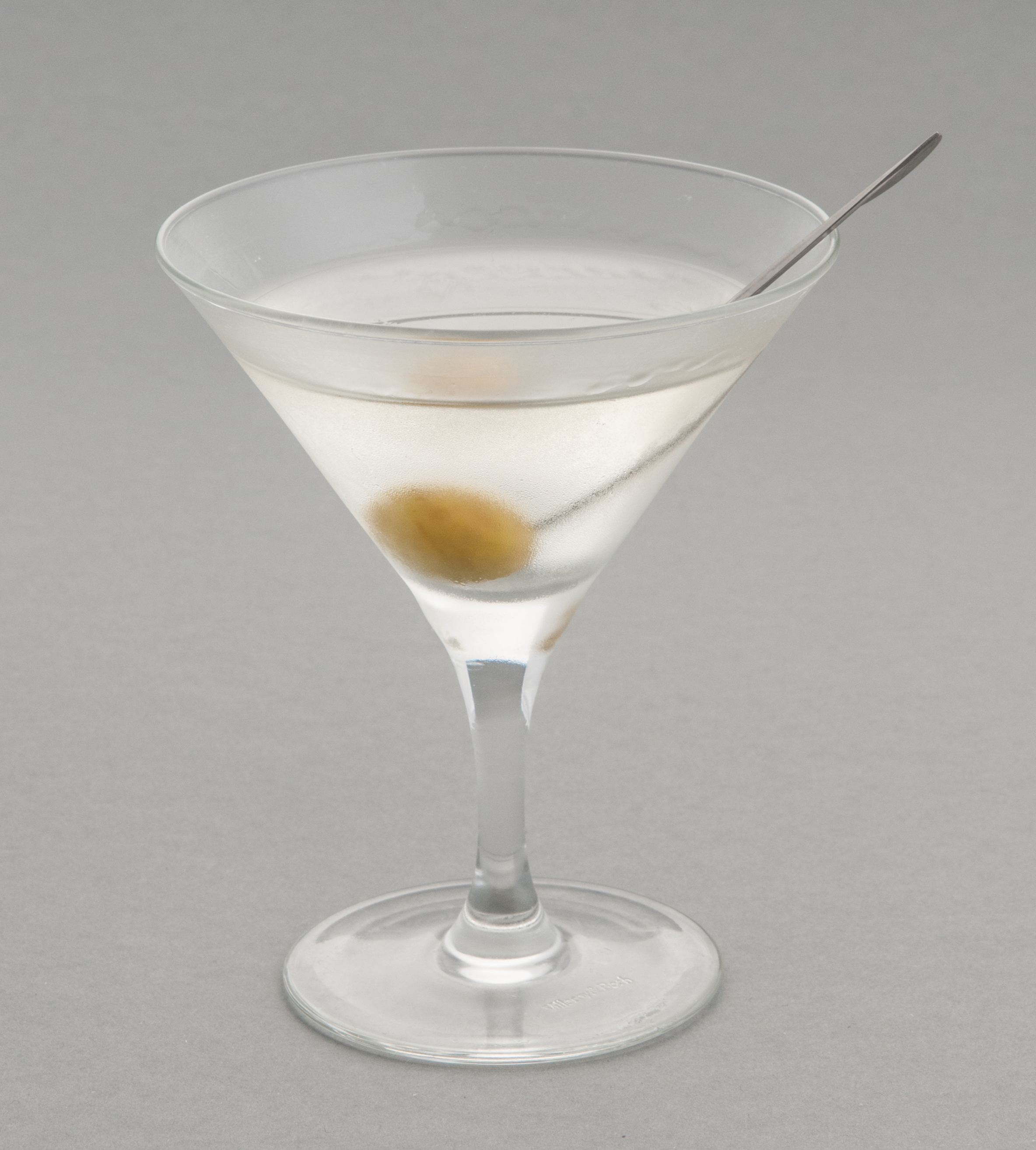
The martini is a well-known cocktail.

Alexander
Made with cognac, cocoa liqueur (crème de cacao), and cream.
Americano
Made with Campari, sweet vermouth, and for the sparkling version, club soda and garnished with a slice of lemon.
Angel face
Made with gin, apricot brandy and Calvados in equal amounts.
Aviation
Made with gin, maraschino liqueur, crème de violette, and lemon juice. Some recipes omit the crème de violette.
Between the sheets
Made with white rum (or other light rum), cognac, triple sec, and lemon juice.
Boulevardier
Made with bourbon or rye whiskey, sweet red vermouth, and bitter Campari.
Brandy crusta
Made with brandy, maraschino liqueur, curaçao, fresh lemon juice, sugar syrup, and Angostura bitters.
Casino
Made with gin, maraschino liqueur, orange bitters and fresh lemon juice.
Clover Club
Made with gin, lemon juice, raspberry syrup, and an egg white.
Daiquiri
Made with rum, citrus juice (typically lime juice), and sugar or other sweetener.
Dry Martini
Made with gin and white vermouth, and garnished with an olive or a lemon twist.
Gin fizz
Made with gin, lemon juice, and sugar, which are shaken with ice, poured into a tumbler and topped with carbonated water.
Hanky panky
Made with gin, sweet vermouth, and Fernet-Branca.
John Collins
Made from gin, lemon juice, simple syrup, and carbonated water.
Last word
Made with equal amounts of gin, green Chartreuse, maraschino liqueur, and fresh lime juice, which are combined in a shaker with ice. After shaking, the mix is poured through a cocktail strainer (sieve) into the glass so that the cocktail contains no ice and is served "straight up".
Manhattan
Made with whiskey, sweet vermouth, and bitters.
Martinez
A classic cocktail made from gin, sweet vermouth, maraschino liqueur, and orange bitters that is widely regarded as the direct precursor to the Martini.
Mary Pickford
Made with white rum, fresh pineapple juice, grenadine, and maraschino liqueur. It is served shaken and chilled, often with a maraschino cherry.
Monkey gland
Made with gin, orange juice, grenadine and absinthe. Created in the 1920s by Harry MacElhone, owner of Harry's New York Bar in Paris, France.
Negroni
An Italian cocktail made with one part gin, one part vermouth rosso (red, semi-sweet), and one part Campari, garnished with orange peel.
Old fashioned
Made by muddling sugar with bitters, adding whiskey or, less commonly, brandy, and garnishing with a twist of citrus rind and a cocktail cherry.
Paradise
Made with gin, apricot brandy (apricot liqueur), and orange juice in a 2:1:1 ratio, with a splash of lemon juice.
Planter's punch
Made with Jamaican rum, fresh lime juice, and sugar cane juice.
Porto flip
Made with brandy, ruby port, and one egg yolk.
Ramos fizz
Made with gin, lemon juice, lime juice, egg white, sugar, cream, orange flower water, and soda water. It is served in a large non-tapered 12-to-14-US-fluid-ounce (350 to 410 ml) Collins glass.
Remember the Maine
Made with rye whiskey, sweet vermouth, cherry brandy, and absinthe.
Rusty nail
Made by mixing Drambuie and Scotch whisky.
Sazerac
A local New Orleans variation of a cognac or whiskey cocktail, named for the Sazerac de Forge et Fils brand of cognac brandy that served as its original main ingredient. The drink is most traditionally a combination of cognac or rye whiskey, absinthe, Peychaud's Bitters, and sugar, although bourbon whiskey is sometimes substituted for the rye and Herbsaint is sometimes substituted for the absinthe.
Sidecar
Made with cognac, orange liqueur (Cointreau, Grand Marnier, Dry Curaçao, or triple sec), plus lemon juice.
Stinger
Duo cocktail made by adding crème de menthe to brandy (although recipes vary).
Tuxedo
Made with gin, dry vermouth, orange bitters, maraschino, and absinthe.
Vieux Carré
Made with rye whiskey, cognac, sweet vermouth liqueur, Bénédictine, and Peychaud's bitters.
Whiskey sour
Mixed drink containing whiskey (often bourbon), lemon juice, sugar, and optionally, a dash of egg white.
White Lady
Made with gin, triple sec and lemon juice.

=== Contemporary Classics ===
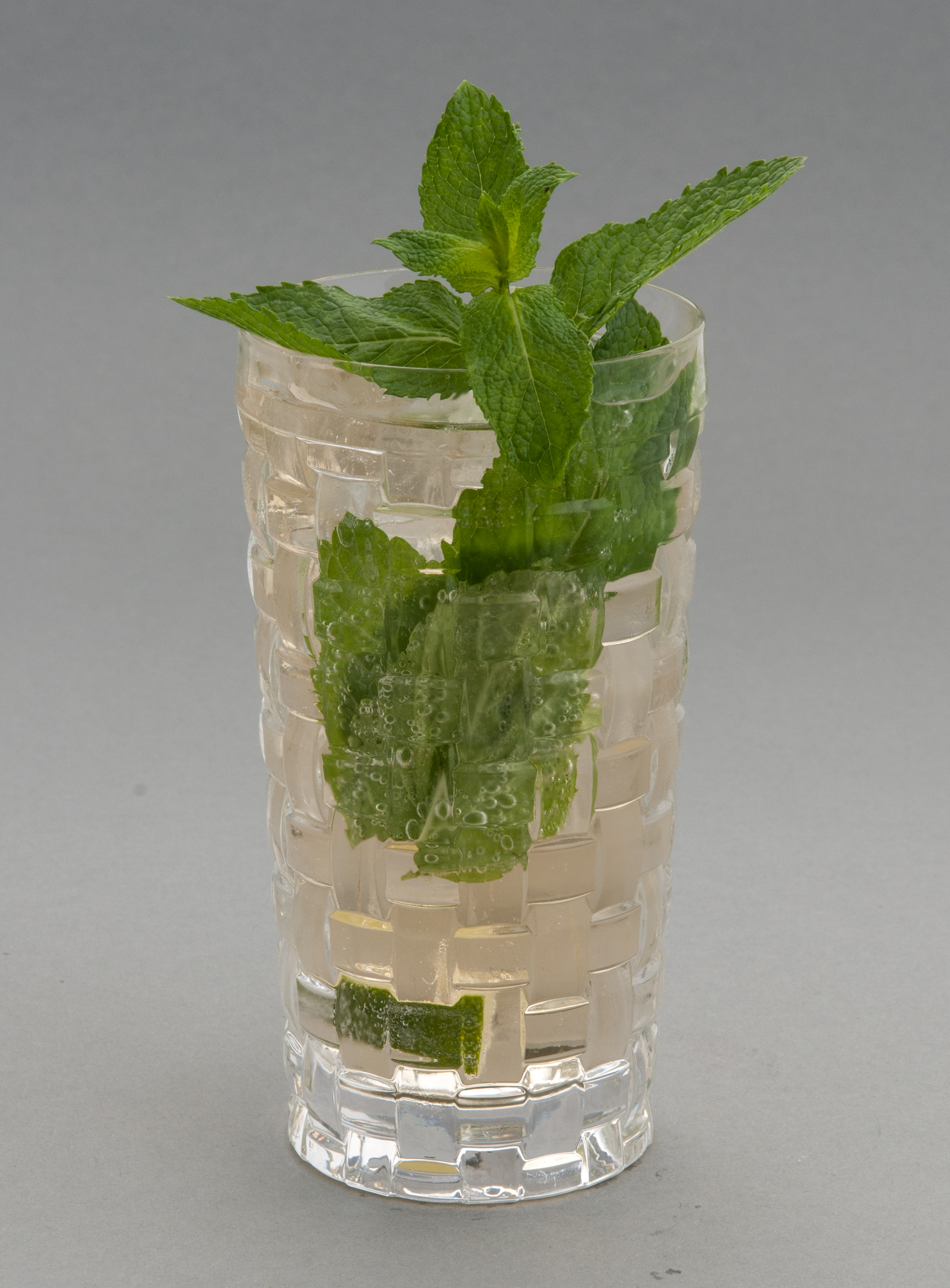
A mojito

Bellini
Made with Prosecco and peach purée or nectar.
Black Russian
Made with vodka and coffee liqueur.
Bloody Mary
Made with vodka, tomato juice, and other spices and flavorings including Worcestershire sauce, hot sauces, garlic, herbs, horseradish, celery, olives, salt, black pepper, lemon juice, lime juice, and celery salt.
Caipirinha
Brazil's national cocktail, made with cachaça (sugarcane hard liquor), sugar, and lime.
Cardinale
Made with gin, dry vermouth, and Campari.
Champagne cocktail
Made with sugar, Angostura bitters, Champagne, brandy, and a maraschino cherry as a garnish.
Corpse reviver #2
Consists of equal parts gin, lemon juice, orange liqueur (commonly Cointreau), Kina Lillet (now usually replaced with Cocchi Americano, as a closer match to Kina Lillet than modern Lillet Blanc), and a dash of absinthe.
Cosmopolitan
Made with vodka, triple sec, cranberry juice, and freshly squeezed or sweetened lime juice.
Cuba libre
Made with cola, rum, and lime juice on ice.
French 75
Made from gin, Champagne, lemon juice, and sugar.
French Connection
Made with equal parts cognac and amaretto liqueur.
Garibaldi
Made with Campari and orange juice.
Grasshopper
Made with equal parts green crème de menthe, white crème de cacao, and cream shaken with ice and strained into a chilled cocktail glass.
Hemingway special
Made with rum, lime juice, maraschino liqueur, and grapefruit juice and served in a double cocktail glass.
Horse's neck
Made with brandy (or sometimes bourbon) and ginger ale, with a long spiral of lemon peel draped over the edge of an 'old-fashioned' or highball glass.
Irish coffee
Made with hot coffee, Irish whiskey, and sugar, stirred, and topped with cream. The coffee is drunk through the cream.
Kir
Made with a measure of crème de cassis (blackcurrant liqueur) topped up with white wine, traditionally Bourgogne Aligoté. It's called kir royal when the wine is replaced with champagne, and Cardinal if replaced with red wine, traditionally a Burgundy red (pinot noir) like Irancy. It is widely appreciated that there be a good amount of crème de cassis, 2 to 3 cl.
Lemon drop
A vodka-based cocktail that is prepared with the addition of lemon juice, triple sec, and simple syrup.
Long Island iced tea
Typically made with vodka, tequila, light rum, triple sec, gin, and a splash of cola, which gives the drink the same amber hue as iced tea.
Mai Tai
Based on rum, Curaçao liqueur, orgeat syrup, and lime juice, associated with Polynesian-style settings.
Margarita
Made with tequila, orange liqueur, and lime juice, often served with salt on the rim of the glass.
Mimosa
Made with Champagne (or other sparkling wine) and chilled citrus juice, usually orange juice unless otherwise specified.
Mint julep
Made primarily with bourbon, sugar, water, crushed or shaved ice, and fresh mint.
Mojito
Made with white rum, sugar (traditionally sugar cane juice), lime juice, soda water, and mint.
Moscow mule
Made with vodka, spicy ginger beer, and lime juice, garnished with a slice or wedge of lime.
Piña colada
Made with rum, cream of coconut or coconut milk, and pineapple juice, usually served either blended or shaken with ice.
Pisco sour
The Peruvian pisco sour uses Peruvian pisco as the base liquor and adds freshly squeezed lemon juice, simple syrup, ice, egg white, and Angostura bitters. The Chilean version is similar, but uses Chilean pisco and pica lime, and excludes the bitters and egg white. Other variants of the cocktail include those created with fruits like pineapple or plants such as coca leaves.
Rabo de galo
Made with cachaça, sweet vermouth, Cynar, and Angostura bitters.
Sea breeze
Made with vodka, cranberry juice, and grapefruit juice.
Sex on the beach
Made with vodka, peach schnapps, orange juice, and cranberry juice.
Singapore sling
A gin-based sling cocktail from Singapore.
Tequila sunrise
Made with tequila, orange juice, and grenadine syrup.
Vesper
Originally made of gin, vodka, and Kina Lillet. The formulations of its ingredients have changed since its original publication in print, and so some modern bartenders have created new versions which attempt to more closely mimic the original taste.
Zombie
Made with fruit juices, liqueurs, and various rums.

=== New Era Drinks ===
Bee's knees
Made with gin, fresh lemon juice, and honey. It is served shaken and chilled, often with a lemon twist.
Bramble
Made with dry gin, lemon juice, sugar syrup, crème de mûre (blackberry liqueur), and crushed ice.
Canchanchara
Made with Cuban aguardiente, honey, and fresh lime juice.
Chartreuse swizzle
Made with Chartreuse, pineapple juice, fresh lime juice, and Falernum.
Dark 'n' stormy
Made with Goslings Black Seal Rum (the "dark") and ginger beer (the "stormy") served over ice and garnished with a slice of lime.
Don's special daiquiri
Made with gold Jamaican rum, Cuban rum, passion fruit juice, fresh lime juice, and honey syrup.
Espresso martini
Made with vodka, espresso coffee, coffee liqueur, and sugar syrup. It is not a true martini as it contains neither gin nor vermouth, but is one of many drinks that incorporate the term into their names.
Fernandito
A long drink of Argentine origin consisting of the Italian amaro liqueur fernet and cola, served over ice.
French martini
The key ingredient that makes a martini "French" is Chambord, a black raspberry liqueur that has been produced in France since 1685.
Gin basil smash
Made with gin, fresh lemon juice, simple syrup, and basil leaves.
Grand margarita
Made with tequila, Grand Marnier, and fresh lime juice.
IBA Tiki
Made with Ron Profundo Havana Club (a white rum), Ron Smoky Havana Club (a barrel-aged rum), Licor Amaretto (almond liqueur), Licor Frangelico (hazelnut liqueur), Maraschino, passion fruit purée, fresh pineapple juice, fresh lime juice, and a slice of ginger root.
Illegal
Made with mezcal, Jamaica overproof white rum, Falernum, maraschino liqueur, lime juice, simple syrup, and optionally a few drops of egg white.
Jungle Bird
Made with Blackstrap rum, Campari, pineapple juice, fresh lime juice, and demerara simple syrup.
Missionary's downfall
Made with white rum, peach brandy, fresh lime juice, honey mix, mint leaves, and pineapple chunks.
Naked and famous
Made with equal parts mezcal, yellow Chartreuse, Aperol, and fresh lime juice.
New York sour
Made with whiskey (rye or bourbon), simple syrup, lemon juice, egg white, and red wine (Shiraz or Malbec).
Old Cuban
Created in 2001 by mixologist Audrey Saunders, it is made with aged rum, fresh lime juice, simple syrup, Angostura bitters, mint leaves, and topped with Champagne brut.
Paloma
Most commonly prepared by mixing tequila, lime juice, and a grapefruit-flavored soda such as Fresca, Squirt, or Jarritos and served on the rocks with a lime wedge. Adding salt to the rim of the glass is also an option.
Paper plane
Made with equal parts bourbon, Aperol, amaro liqueur, and lemon juice.
Penicillin
Made with whisky, ginger, honey syrup, and fresh lemon juice.
Pisco punch
Made with Pisco, fresh pineapple juice, simple syrup, fresh lemon juice, dry white wine, and cloves.
Porn star martini
Made with vanilla vodka, passion fruit liqueur, passion fruit purée, vanilla sugar, and Champagne on the side.
Russian spring punch
Made with vodka, crème de cassis, sugar syrup, and lemon juice.
Sherry cobbler
Made with two kinds of sherry (Amontillado and Palo Cortado), sugar, orange wheel, and lemon wheel.
South Side
Made with gin, lemon juice, simple syrup, and mint (also known as "Southside").
Spicy Fifty
Made with vodka, elderflower cordial, honey syrup, red chili pepper, and fresh lime juice.
Spritz
Made with Prosecco, bitters, and soda water.
Suffering bastard
Name for two different mixed drinks, one being more of a standard cocktail associated with World War II and the other being more of an exotic drink associated with Tiki bars.
Three dots and a dash
Made with Martinique rum, blended aged rum, Falernum, allspice liqueur, honey syrup, fresh lime juice, fresh orange juice, and Angostura bitters.
Tipperary
Made with Irish whiskey, sweet red Vermouth, green Chartreuse, and Angostura bitters.
Tommy's margarita
Made with tequila, lime juice, and agave nectar or simple syrup, and orange bitters served in a cocktail glass. It is distinct from the margarita in its omission of orange liqueur and its preferred substitution of agave nectar to highlight the natural agave notes in tequila.
Trinidad sour
Made with Angostura bitters, orgeat syrup, lemon juice, and rye whiskey.
Ve.n.to
Made with white smooth grappa, lemon juice, honey mix (made with chamomile infusion if desired), chamomile cordial, and optionally, egg white.

== Former drinks ==
The following drinks were removed on various updates of the list:

- B-52
- Bacardi
- Barracuda
- Derby
- Dirty martini, a martini containing a splash of olive brine or olive juice and typically garnished with an olive
- Godfather
- Godmother
- Golden dream
- Harvey Wallbanger
- Kamikaze
- Orgasm
- Rose
- Screwdriver
- Vampiro
- Yellow bird

== History ==
After the initial 1961 list, there have been revisions in 1987, 1993, 2004, 2011, 2020, and 2024.

=== 1961 ===
The 1961 list consisted of 50 drinks: Adonis, Affinity, Alaska, Alexander, Angel Face, Bacardi, Bamboo, Bentley, Between The Sheets, Block And Fall, Bloody Mary, Bobby Burns, Bombay, Bronx, Brooklyn, Caruso, Casino, Claridge, Clover Club, Czarina, Daiquiri, Derby, Diki-Diki, Duchess, Est-India, Gibson, Gin And It, Grand Slam, Grasshopper, Manhattan, Martini Dry, Martini Sweet, Mary Pickford, Mikado, Monkey Gland, Negroni, Old Fashioned, Old Pal, Orange Blossom, Oriental, Paradise, Parisian, Planters, Princeton, Rob Roy, Rose, Sidecar, Stinger, White Lady, Za-Za.

=== 1987 ===
The 1987 list consisted of 73 drinks: Alexander, Americano, Apotheke, Bacardi, Banana Bliss, Banana Daiquiri, B & B, Bellini, Black Russian, Bloody Mary, Blu Lagoon, Bronx, Buck’s Fizz, Bull Shot, Champagne Cocktail, Champagne Pick Me Up, Collins (Tom Collins), Coffes (Irish Whiskey), Daiquiri, Egg Nogs (Cognac), Fizzes (Gin), Florida, French Connection, Frozen Daiquiri, Garibaldi, Gibson, Gimlet (Gin O Vodka), Gin And French, Gin And It, Golden Cadillac, Golden Dream, God Father, God Mother, Grasshopper, Harvey Wallbanger, Horse’s Neck, King Alfonzo, Kir, Kir Imperial, Kir Royal, Mai Tai, Manhattan, Margarita, Martini, Negroni, Old Fashioned, Paradise, Pimm’s Cup N°1, Piña Colada, Planter’s Punch, Porto Flip, Prairie Oyster, Pussy Foot, Rob Roy, Rose, Rusty Nail, Salty Dog, Screwdriver, Shirley Temple, Sidecar, Singapore Sling, Snowball, Sours (Whiskey), Spritzer, Stinger, Strawberry Daiquiri, Tequila Sunrise, Tequini, Velvet Hammer, Vodkatini, White Lady, White Russian, White Spider.

A total of 24 drinks were removed: Adonis, Affinity, Alaska, Bamboo, Bentley, Block And Fall, Bobby Burns, Bombay, Brooklyn, Caruso, Claridge, Czarina, Diki-Diki, Duchess, Est-India, Grand Slam, Martini Sweet, Mikado, Old Pal, Orange Blossom, Oriental, Parisian, Princeton, Za-Za.

=== 1993 ===
The 1993 list consisted of 60 drinks: Alexander, Americano, Bacardi, Banana Frozen Daiquiri, Bellini, Black Russian, Bloody Mary, Brandy Egg Nog, Bronx, Buck’s Fizz ( Mimosa ), Bull Shot, Champagne Cocktail, Daiquiri, Florida (non-alcoholic), French Connection, Frozen Daiquiri, Garibaldi, Gibson, Gin And French, Gin And It, Gin Fizz, Golden Cadillac, Golden Dream, God Father, God Mother, Grasshopper, Harvey Wallbanger, Horse’s Neck, Irish Coffee, John Collins, Kir, Kir Royal, Manhattan, Manhattan Dry, Manhattan Perfect, Margarita, Martini Dry, Martini Perfect, Martini Sweet, Martini Vodka, Negroni, Old Fashioned, Paradise, Parson’s Special (non-alcoholic), Piña Colada, Planter’s Punch, Porto Flip, Pussy Foot (non-alcoholic), Rob Roy, Rose, Rusty Nail, Screwdriver, Shirley Temple (non-alcoholic), Sidecar, Singapore Sling, Stinger, Tequila Sunrise, Whiskey Sour, White Lady, White Russian.

=== 2004 ===
The 2004 list consisted of 66 drinks in five categories:

- Pre Dinner (23 drinks): Americano, Bacardi Cocktail, Daiquiri, Banana Daiquiri, Frozen Daiquiri, Bronx, Kir, Kir Royal, Manhattan, Manhattan Dry, Manhattan Perfect, Margarita, Martini Dry, Martini Perfect, Martini Sweet, Martini Vodka, Gibson, Negroni, Paradise, Old Fashioned, Rob Roy, Rose, Whiskey Sour
- After Dinner (11 drinks): Brandy Alexander, Black Russian, White Russian, French Connection, God Father, God Mother, Golden Cadillac, Golden Dream, Grasshopper, Porto Flip, Rusty Nail
- Long Drink Style (17 drinks): Bellini, Bloody Mary, Brandy Egg Nog, Buck’s Fizz, Mimosa, Bull Shot, Champagne Cocktail, John Collins*, Gin Fizz, Harvey Wallbanger, Horse’s Neck, Irish Coffee, Pina Colada, Planter’s Punch, Screwdriver, Singapore Sling, Tequila Sunrise
- The Most Popular (14 drinks): Caipirinha*, Cosmopolitan, Japanese Slipper, Kamikaze, Long Island Iced Tea, Mai-Tai, Mojito, Orgasm, B 52, Salty Dog, Sea-Breeze, Cuba Libre, Sex On The Beach, Apple Martini
- Special Cocktails (1 drink): Ladyboy

=== 2011 ===
The 2011 list consisted of 77 drinks in three categories:

- The Unforgettables (30 drinks): Alexander, Americano, Angel Face, Aviation, Bacardi, Between The Sheets, Casino, Clover Club, Daiquiri, Derby, Dry Martini, Gin Fizz, John Collins, Manhattan, Mary Pickford, Monkey Gland, Negroni, Old Fashioned, Paradise, Planters Punch, Porto Flip, Ramos Gin Fizz, Rusty Nail, Sazerac, Screwdriver, Sidecar, Stinger, Tuxedo, Whiskey Sour, White Lady
- Contemporary Classics (31 drinks): Bellini, Black Russian, Bloody Mary, Caipirinha, Champagne Cocktail, Cosmopolitan, Cuba Libre, French 75, French Connection, Godfather, Godmother, Golden Dream, Grasshopper, Harvey Wallbanger, Hemingway Special, Horses Neck, Irish Coffee, Kir, Long Island Iced Tea, Mai Tai, Margarita, Mimosa, Mint Julep, Mojito, Moscow Mule, Pina Colada, Rose, Sea Breeze, Sex On The Beach, Singapore Sling, Tequila Sunrise
- New Era Drinks (16 drinks): B-52, Barracuda, Bramble, Dark N Stormy, Dirty Martini, Espresso Martini, French Martini, Kamikaze, Lemon Drop Martini, Pisco Sour, Russian Spring Punch, Spritz Veneziano, Tommy's Margarita, Vampiro, Vesper Martini, Yellow Bird

=== 2020 ===
The IBA list was significantly updated in 2020, with 24 new drinks, 11 removed drinks, 2 movements between sections, and 1 renaming.

The following 24 drinks were added in the 2020 update:

- 6 drinks added to The Unforgettables: Boulevardier, Brandy Crusta, Hanky Panky, Last Word, Martinez, Vieux Carré.
- 2 drinks added to Contemporary Classics: Corpse Reviver #2, Zombie.
- 16 drinks added to New Era Drinks: Bee's Knees, Canchanchara, Fernandito, Illegal, Naked and Famous, New York Sour, Old Cuban, Paloma, Paper Plane, Penicillin, Southside, Spicy Fifty, Suffering Bastard, Tipperary, Trinidad Sour, Ve.n.to.

The following 11 drinks were removed in the 2020 update:

- 3 drinks removed from The Unforgettables: Bacardi, Derby, Screwdriver
- 4 drinks removed from Contemporary Classics: Godfather, Godmother, Harvey Wallbanger, Rose
- 4 drinks removed from New Era Drinks: B-52, Dirty Martini, Kamikaze, Vampiro

Other changes:

- Pisco Sour and Vesper both moved from "New Era Drinks" to "Contemporary Classics"
- "Spritz Veneziano" was renamed "Spritz", and remained in "New Era Drinks"

=== 2024 ===
The IBA list was updated in early November 2024 with 15 new drinks, 3 removed drinks, and 1 movement between sections. For the first time ever, each category is evenly split, with 34 drinks in each.

The following 15 drinks were added in the 2024 update:

- 1 drink added to The Unforgettables: Remember the Maine
- 3 drinks added to Contemporary Classics: Cardinale, Garibaldi, Rabo De Galo.
- 11 drinks added to The New Era: Chartreuse Swizzle, Don's Special Daiquiri, Gin Basil Smash, Grand Margarita, IBA Tiki, Jungle Bird, Missionary's Downfall, Pisco Punch, Porn Star Martini, Sherry Cobbler, Three Dots and a Dash.

The following 3 drinks were removed in the 2024 update:

- 1 drink removed from Contemporary Classics: Golden Dream
- 2 drinks removed from The New Era: Barracuda, Yellow Bird.

Other changes:

- Lemon Drop Martini was moved from "New Era Drinks" to "Contemporary Classics"
- "Southside" was briefly removed in early 2021, but was present from mid-2021 to mid-2023. It was again removed from mid-2023, before being added in the 2024 update as "South Side".

== See also ==
- List of cocktails
- List of national drinks
