= Orgasm (cocktail) =

Cocktail with three liqueurs

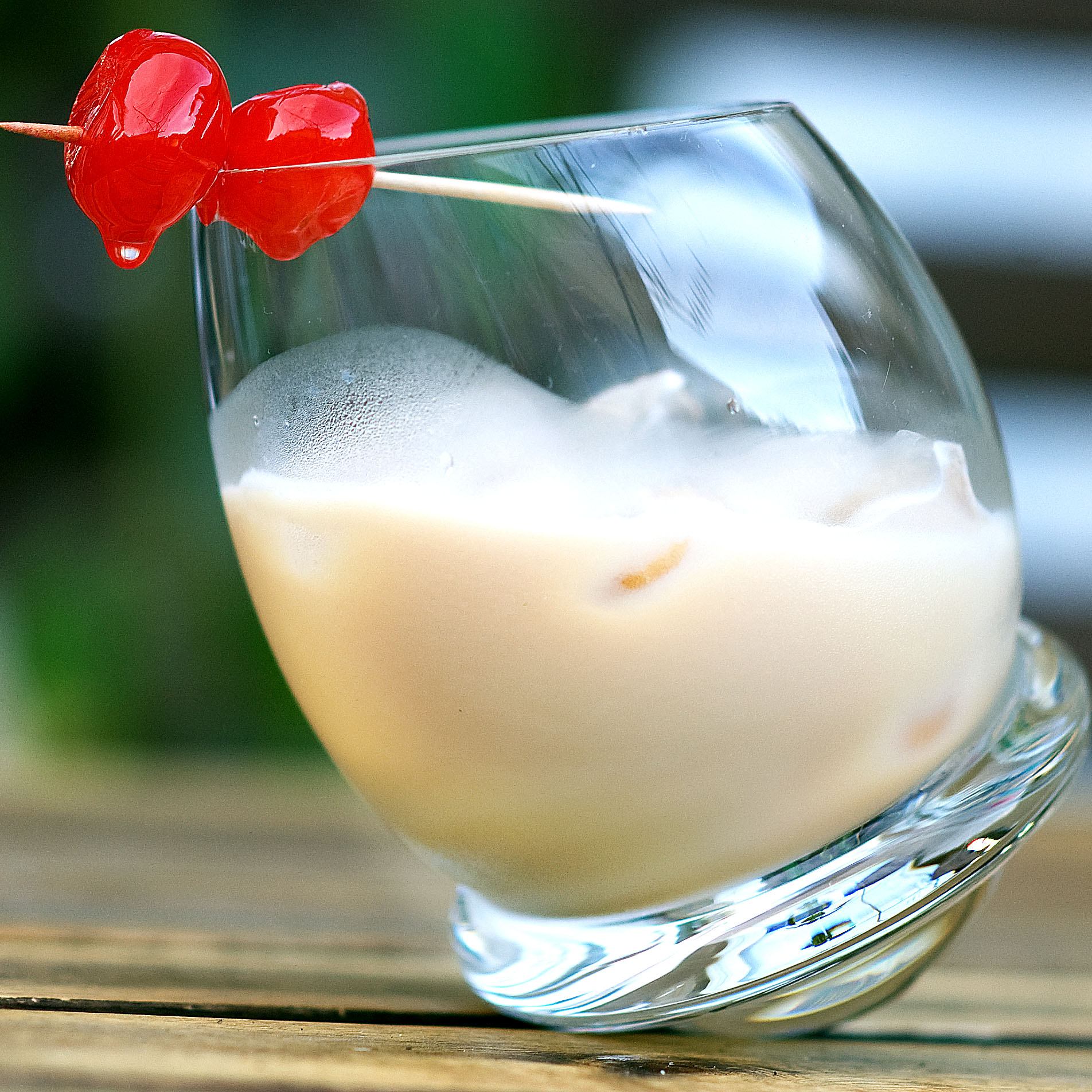
- Type: Cocktail
- Ingredients: 3 cl Cointreau; 3 cl Irish Cream; 2 cl Grand Marnier; 1 Maraschino cherry
- Base spirit: Grand Marnier, Irish cream
- Standard drinkware: Old fashioned glass
- Standard garnish: Cherry
- Served: On the rocks: poured over ice
- Preparation: Build all ingredients over ice in an old fashioned glass or shot glass.

The orgasm is a cocktail that can be served either on the rocks or layered and drunk as a shooter.

There are many versions of this popular mixed drink. Bartending 101 gives one version as equal parts Amaretto, Kahlúa and Baileys Irish Cream. One version is "made on your B.A.C.K.", meaning it is made with Baileys, Amaretto, half and half (cream) and Kahlúa, with each ingredient having one part. Another variation contains 1/3 oz. each of Vodka, Amaretto, Triple Sec, White Crème de cacao, and 1 oz. of light cream. The "screaming orgasm" is often made with 2 cl Vodka, Kahlúa, Amaretto, and Bailey's, and 4 cl milk.

Since 2011, the cocktail is no longer part of the official IBA cocktails of the International Bartenders Association (IBA).
