= Jungle Bird =

Cocktail with blackstrap rum, Campari, pineapple juice, lime juice, and demerara syrup

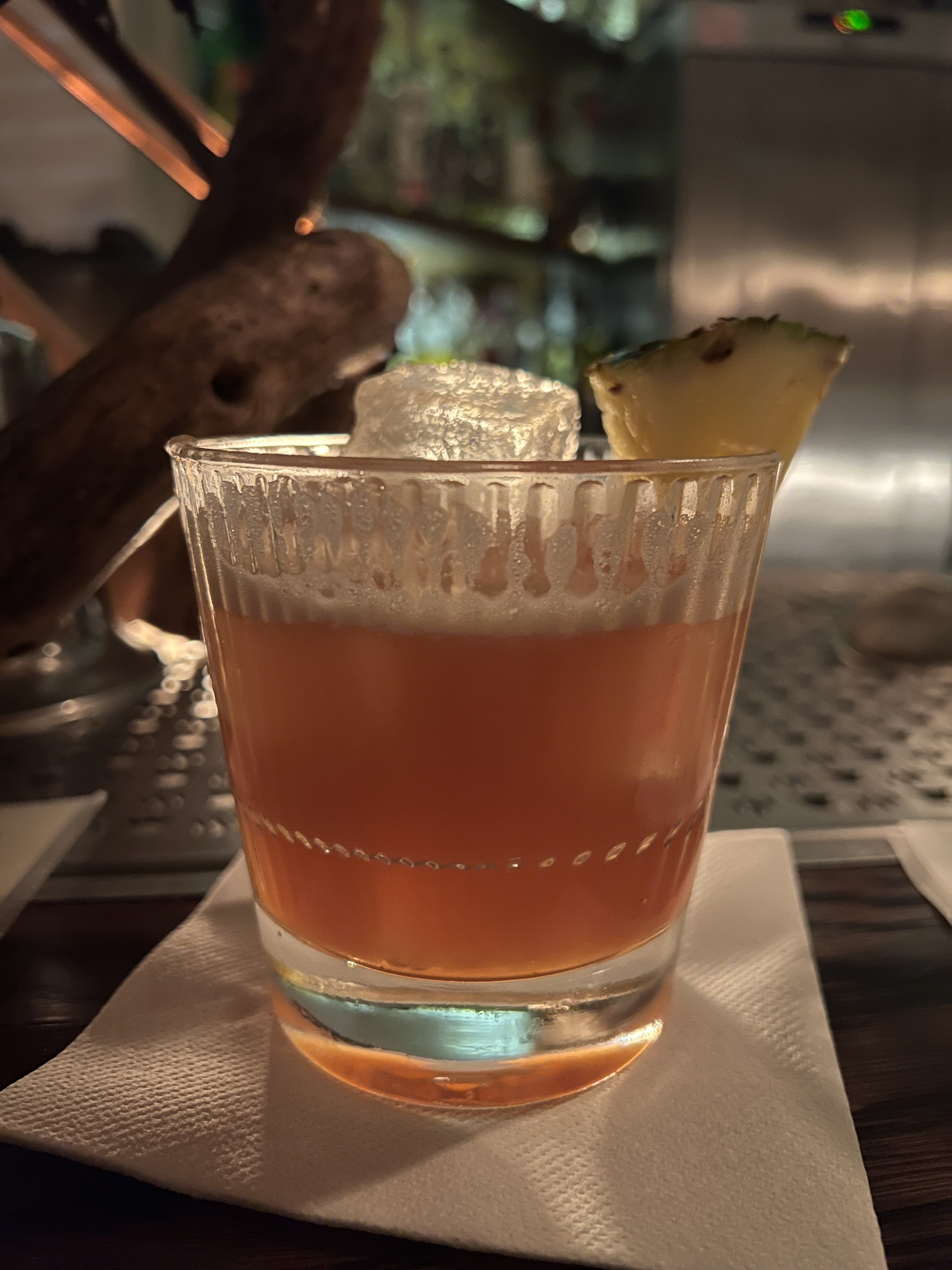
- Type: Cocktail
- Ingredients: 45 mL blackstrap rum; 22.5 mL Campari; 45 mL pineapple juice; 15 mL lime juice; 15 mL demerara syrup
- Base spirit: Rum
- Standard drinkware: Rocks glass
- Standard garnish: Pineapple wedge
- Served: On the rocks
- Preparation: Shake with ice and strain into a rocks glass filled with ice.

The Jungle Bird is a tiki cocktail made with blackstrap rum, Campari, pineapple juice, lime juice, and demerara syrup. Invented by Malaysian beverage manager Jeffrey Ong in 1973, it has been recognized by the International Bartenders Association as an official cocktail since 2024.

== History ==
The Jungle Bird debuted on 6 July 1973 at the Aviary Bar at the Hilton hotel in Kuala Lumpur, where beverage manager Jeffrey Ong invented it as the welcome drink for guests. The cocktail's name was inspired by the colorful tropical birds fenced in at the namesake aviary visible from the bar. The drink was originally served in a bird-shaped ceramic vessel.

The cocktail gained international recognition after it was included in the 1989 book The New American Bartender's Guide by John J. Poister, with the recipe generically calling for dark rum. American mixologist and tiki historian Jeff "Beachbum" Berry encountered the Jungle Bird in Poister's book and adapted it for his 2002 tropical beverage book Intoxica!, tweaking the recipe to call for "dark Jamaican rum" specifically. On what inspired him to include the cocktail in the book, Berry recounted: "The only thing that made it interesting was that Campari was in it. A tropical drink with an amaro was unusual." He remarked, "It definitely was on no one’s radar before I published it."

In 2010, the Jungle Bird reached its modern form at Painkiller, a now-closed bar in New York City, where bartender Giuseppe González specified the more intense blackstrap rum and reduced the pineapple juice from 4 US fl oz to 1.5 US fl oz. González's recipe has become widely accepted by bartenders as the canonical formula.

The Jungle Bird's popularity in the United States increased in the 2010s. In a 2014 article in The New York Times, it was called a "hitherto obscure tiki drink" that "has bloomed into a bartender favorite whose popularity goes well beyond the parameters of the resurgent tiki culture." Berry suggests that the Jungle Bird's inclusion of Campari allowed it to bridge the gap between tiki culture and the craft cocktail movement, explaining, "It was the one tiki drink you'd find in craft cocktail bars that wanted nothing to do with tiki."

Malaysian newspaper The Star named the Jungle Bird "Malaysia's only internationally recognised classic cocktail" in an obituary following the death of Jungle Bird inventor Jeffrey Ong in 2019.
