= Tommy's margarita =

Variant of the margarita cocktail

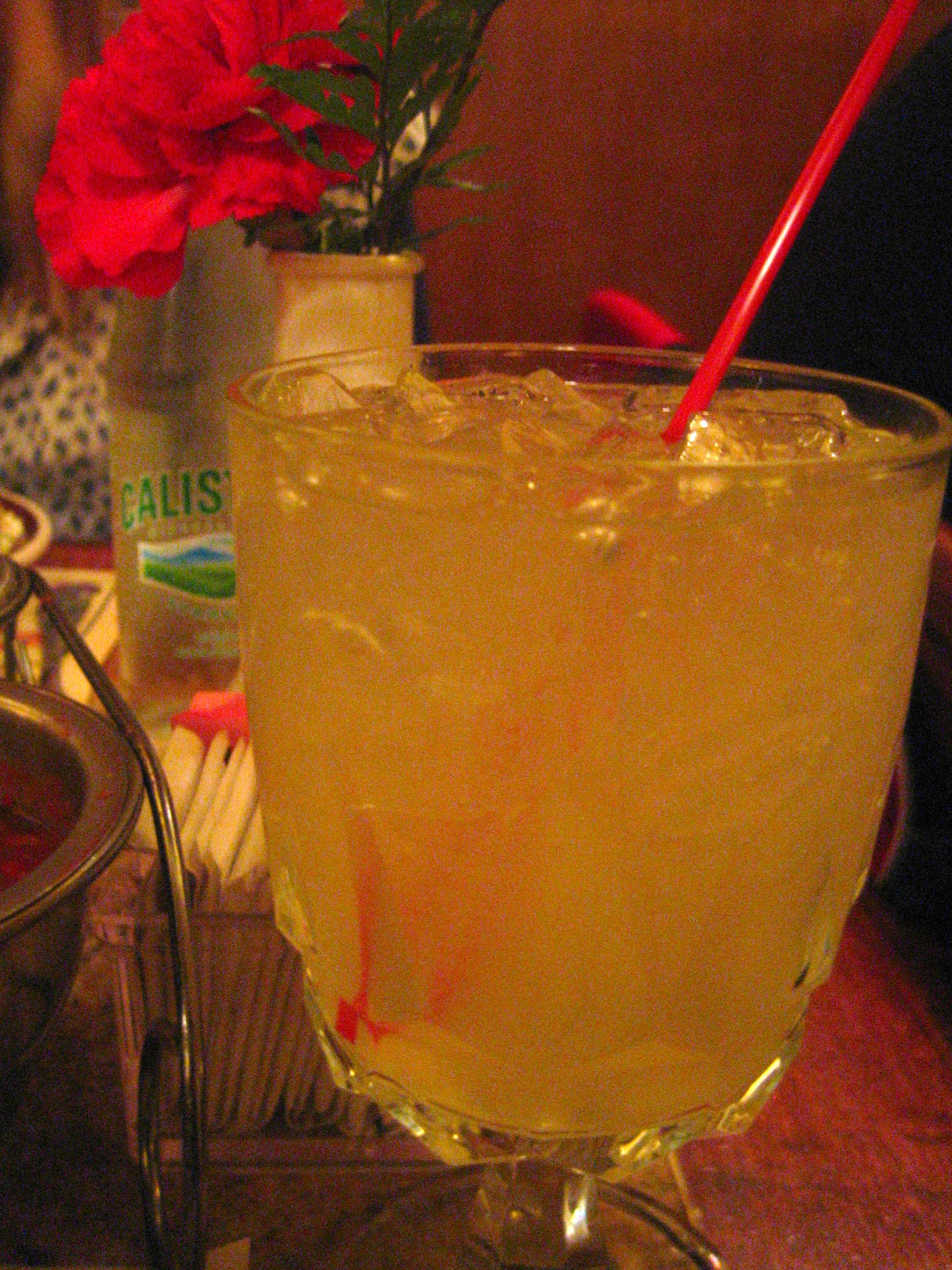
- Tommy's margarita as it is served at Tommy's Mexican Restaurant
- Type: Mixed drink
- Ingredients: 60 ml Tequila 100% agave; 30 ml Fresh lime juice; 30 ml Agave syrup (1/2 water + 1/2 agave nectar)
- Base spirit: Tequila
- Standard drinkware: Old fashioned glass
- Standard garnish: Lime slice
- Served: On the rocks: poured over ice
- Preparation: Pour all ingredients into a cocktail shaker, shake well with ice, strain into a chilled rocks glass filled with ice.

Tommy's margarita is a variant of the margarita cocktail that uses agave nectar instead of triple sec and simple syrup. It is recognized by the IBA as a new era drink.

== Mixture ==
It is made with tequila, lime juice, and agave nectar, and served in a cocktail glass with ice. It is distinct from the classic margarita due to its omission of orange liqueur and its preferred substitution of agave, which accents the notes in the agave-based tequila.

== History ==
The cocktail was conceived in 1990 by Julio Bermejo while working at Tommy's Mexican Restaurant in San Francisco. Bermejo had been recently introduced to agave nectar as an ingredient, and, although it was expensive at the time, he preferred to use it to enhance the agave flavor of the tequila instead of using triple sec to highlight the citrus flavor in the original margarita recipe.

In 2008, it became the first venue-specific cocktail to be added to the IBA manual.

== See also ==
- List of cocktails
- List of IBA official cocktails
