= Rabo de Galo =

IBA official cocktail from Brazil

- Type: Cocktail
- Ingredients: 60 ml Cachaça; 20 ml Sweet Vermouth; 15 ml Cynar; 2 dashes Angostura bitters (optional)
- Standard drinkware: Old fashioned glass
- Standard garnish: Orange twist
- Served: On the rocks
- Preparation: Build all ingredients in a rocks glass over ice and stir briefly.

Rabo de Galo (Portuguese for "rooster's tail") is a Brazilian cocktail made with cachaça, sweet vermouth and Cynar, and is one of the official cocktails recognised by the International Bartenders Association (IBA), which lists it among the Contemporary Classics.

The drink rose to popularity in São Paulo in the mid-1950s, after the Italian vermouth producer Cinzano opened a factory in the city. To encourage Brazilians to mix their domestic cachaça with imported vermouth, the producer promoted the practice of combining two spirits in a single glass. The resulting aperitif took its name from the Portuguese words rabo ("tail") and galo ("rooster" or "cock"), and it has since become one of the most widely consumed cocktails in Brazil.

According to the IBA specification, the cachaça, sweet vermouth and Cynar are combined directly in an old fashioned glass over ice and stirred briefly; a few dashes of Angostura bitters may be added optionally. The drink is garnished with an orange twist.

== See also ==
- List of IBA official cocktails
- List of cocktails
