= Canchanchara =

IBA official cocktail made with Cuban aguardiente, honey, and fresh lime juice

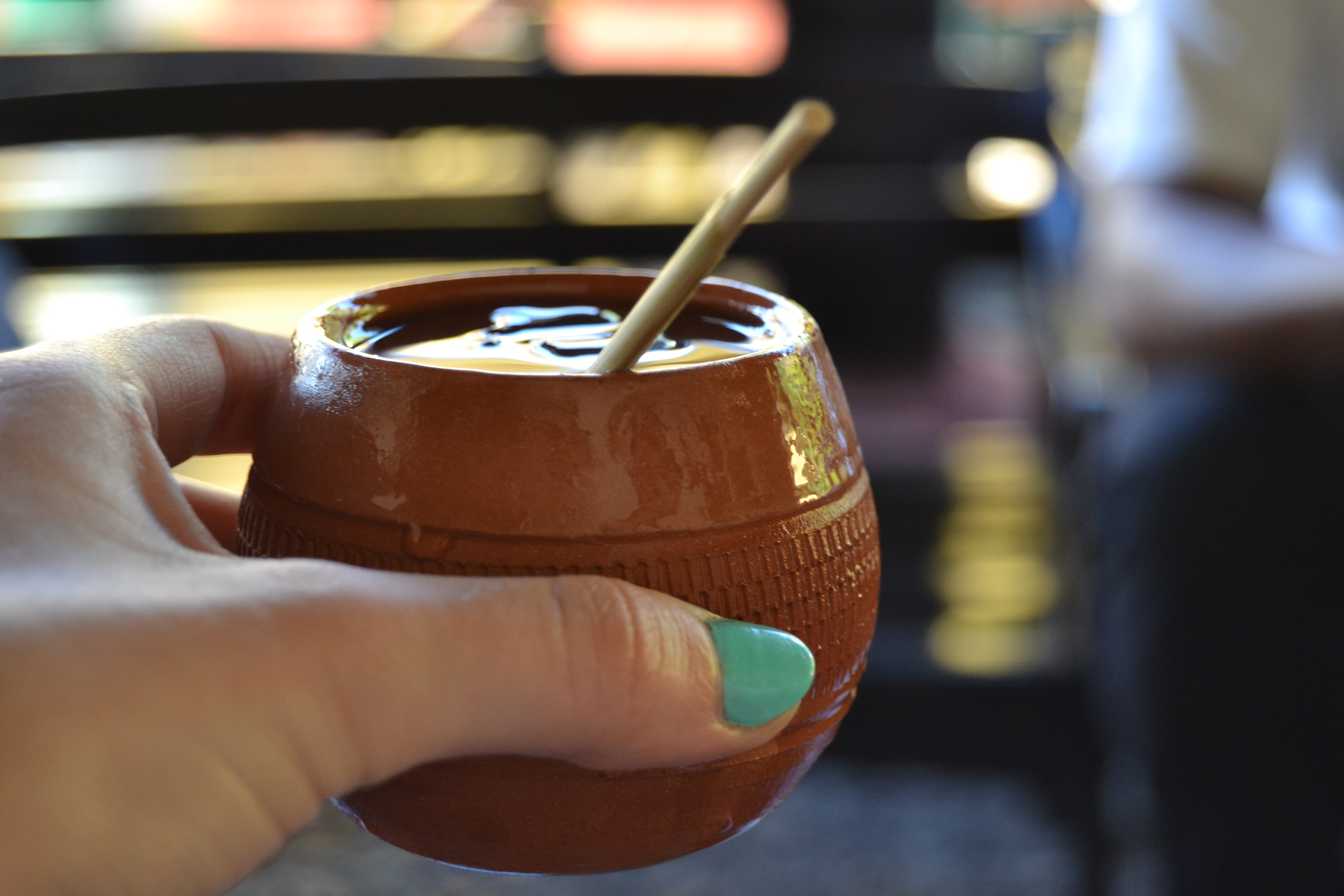
- Canchanchara
- Type: Cocktail
- Ingredients: 60 ml Cuban aguardiente; 15 ml fresh lime juice; 15 ml raw honey; 50 ml water
- Standard drinkware: Old fashioned glass
- Standard garnish: Lime wedge
- Served: On the rocks: poured over ice
- Preparation: Mix honey with water and lime juice and spread the mixture on the bottom and sides of the glass. Add cracked ice, and then the rum. End by energetically stirring from bottom to top.

The Canchanchara is an IBA official cocktail made with Cuban aguardiente, honey, and fresh lime juice.

== See also ==
- List of cocktails
