= Orange liqueur =

Orange liqueur is a liqueur produced from oranges. Orange liqueurs include:

- Curaçao
- Grand Marnier
- Triple sec such as Cointreau
