= Ve.n.to =

Grappa-based IBA official cocktail

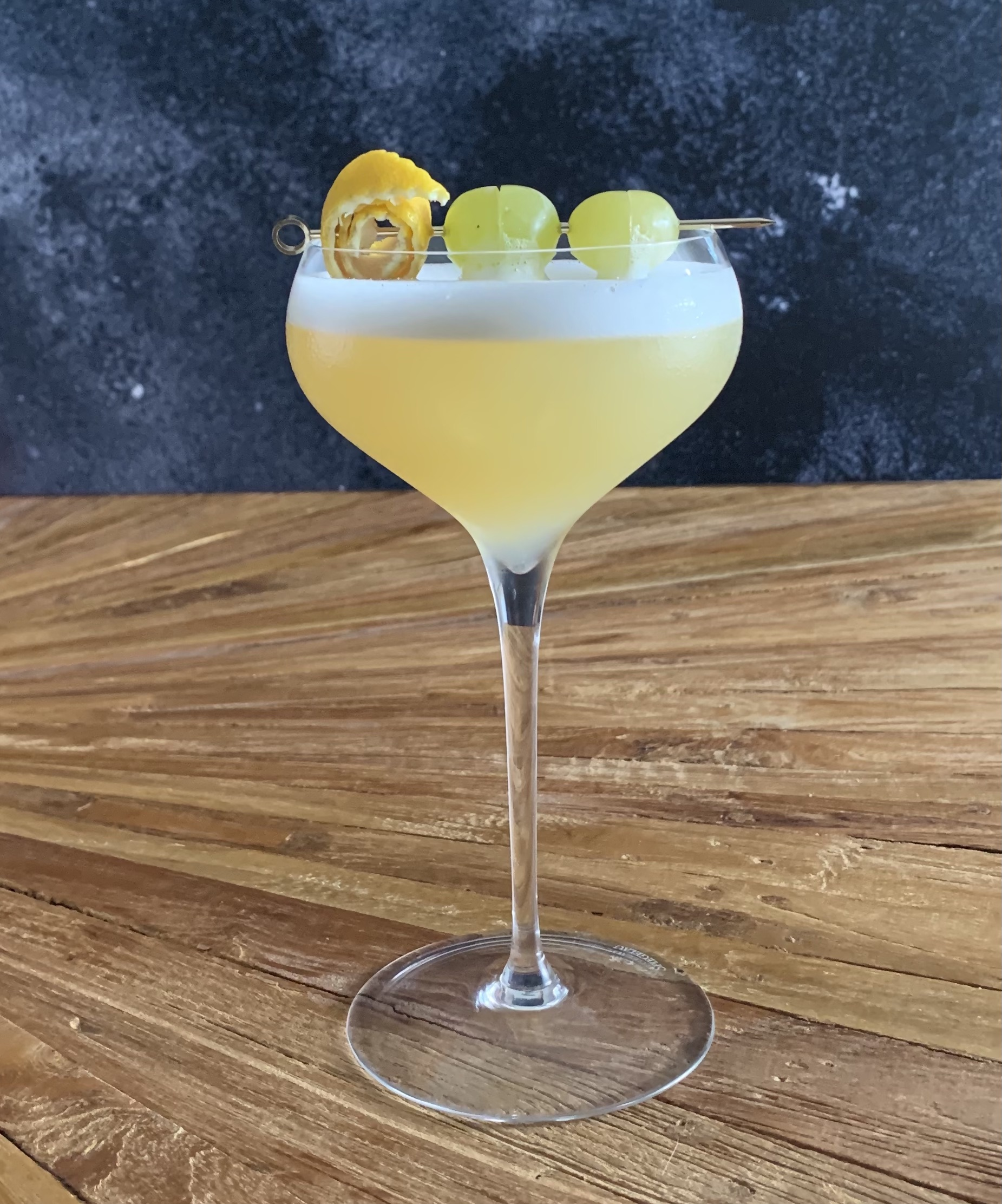
- Type: Cocktail
- Ingredients: 4.5 cl white smooth grappa; 2.25 cl fresh lemon juice; 1.5 cl honey mix (made with chamomile infusion if desired); 1.5 cl chamomile cordial; 1 cl egg white (optional)
- Base spirit: Grappa
- Standard drinkware: Tumbler
- Standard garnish: Lemon zest and white grapes
- Served: On the rocks: poured over ice
- Preparation: Pour all ingredients into the shaker. Shake vigorously with ice. Strain into a chilled small tumbler glass filled with ice.

The Ve.n.to, sometimes referred to as the Vento, is a cocktail made of grappa, fresh lemon juice, honey, and chamomile cordial, with an optional egg white. It is the only grappa-based cocktail included in the official list of the International Bartenders Association (IBA), where it is classified among the New Era Drinks.

== History ==
The Ve.n.to is regarded as the first grappa-based cocktail to gain international recognition, following its inclusion among the New Era Drinks in the IBA official cocktail list published in 2020.

The recipe is credited to the Italian bartenders Samuele Ambrosi and Leonardo Veronesi, developed with the involvement of the promotional project Grappa Revolution founded by Leonardo Pinto. The drink's addition to the IBA list was supported by Giorgio Fadda, then president of the International Bartenders Association. The creators' stated aim was to showcase grappa as a distinctively Italian spirit, building on the traditional pairing of grappa and honey.

The name Ve.n.to is an acronym formed from the initial letters of Veneto and Trentino, two regions historically associated with grappa production, which also supply the cocktail's ingredients.

== Preparation ==
According to the official IBA recipe, the ingredients—white smooth grappa, fresh lemon juice, a honey mix (in which the water may be replaced with a chamomile infusion), chamomile cordial, and optionally a few drops of egg white—are poured into a shaker and shaken vigorously with ice. The mixture is then strained into a chilled small tumbler glass filled with ice and garnished with lemon zest and white grapes.

== See also ==
- List of cocktails
