= Garibaldi (cocktail) =

Cocktail of Campari and orange juice

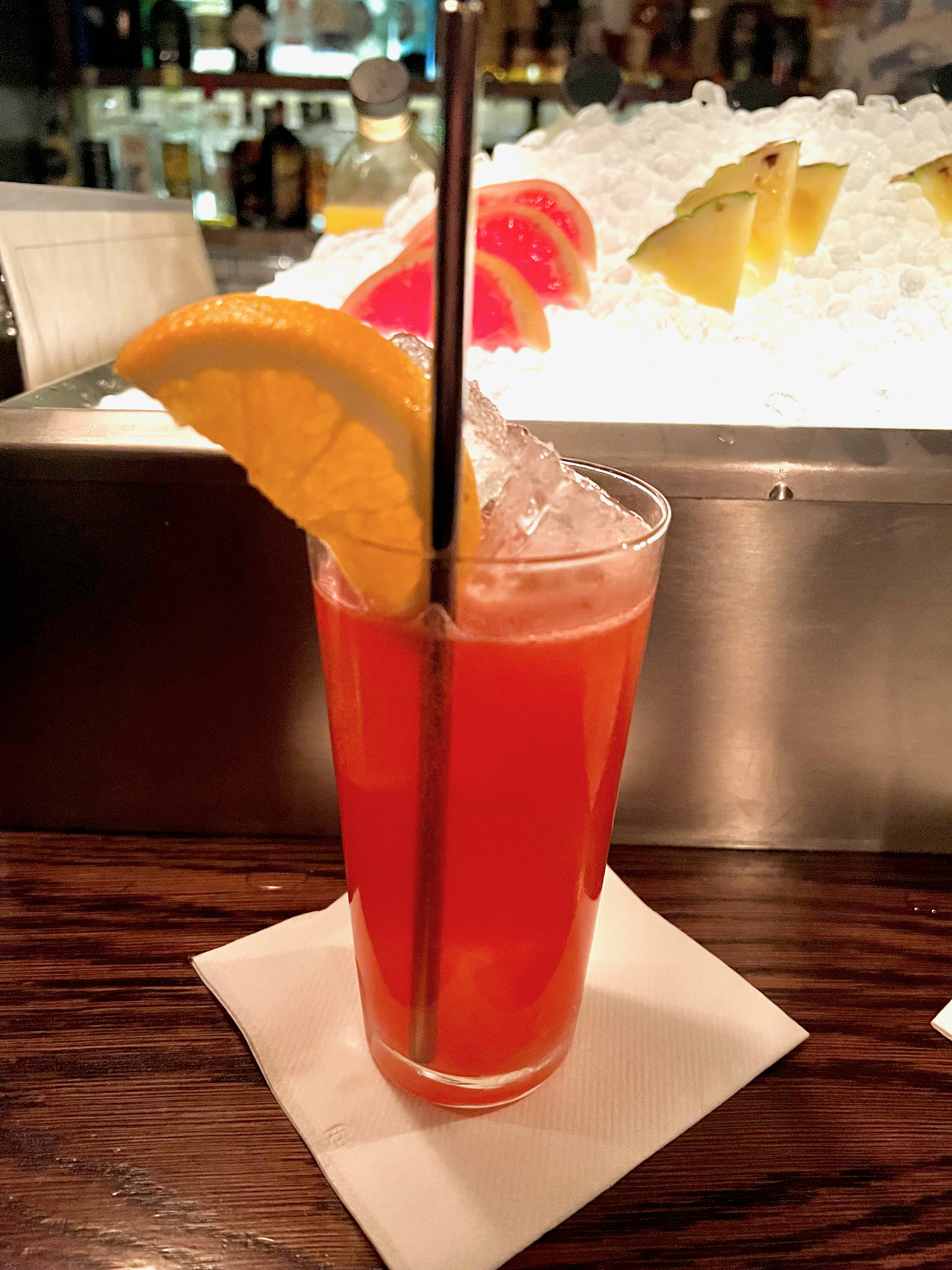
- Type: Cocktail
- Ingredients: 1½ oz (45 ml) Campari; 4 oz (120 ml) freshly squeezed orange juice; (approx. the juice of 1 orange)
- Standard drinkware: Highball or Rocks glass
- Standard garnish: Orange wedge
- Served: Over ice
- Preparation: Fill glass with ice cubes. Add the Campari and orange juice (optional: Stir to combine. Garnish.)

The Garibaldi is an Italian aperitivo cocktail made with Campari and freshly squeezed orange juice, typically served over ice. The drink is named after Giuseppe Garibaldi, the 19th-century Italian general associated with the movement toward Italian unification.

== History ==
Popularized circa 1960, the Garibaldi was included in the list of IBA official cocktails in 1986, 1993 and after being removed for a few decades was re-added to the list of Contemporary classics in 2024. Named after Italian hero Giuseppe Garibaldi, the cocktail's ingredients are said to symbolically evoke the unification of Italy with Campari from the northern city of Milan evoking the north and/or Garibaldi's Redshirts, and the oranges from the southern island of Sicily evoke the south and/or the landing spot of the Redshirt in the Campaign of 1860, making the cocktail a symbolic pairing of the two.

Modern trade websites recommend that the orange juice be freshly pressed and some recommend increasing the frothiness by blending it.

== See also ==
- List of cocktails
- List of IBA official cocktails
