= Gin basil smash =

Cocktail of gin, lemon, sugar, and basil

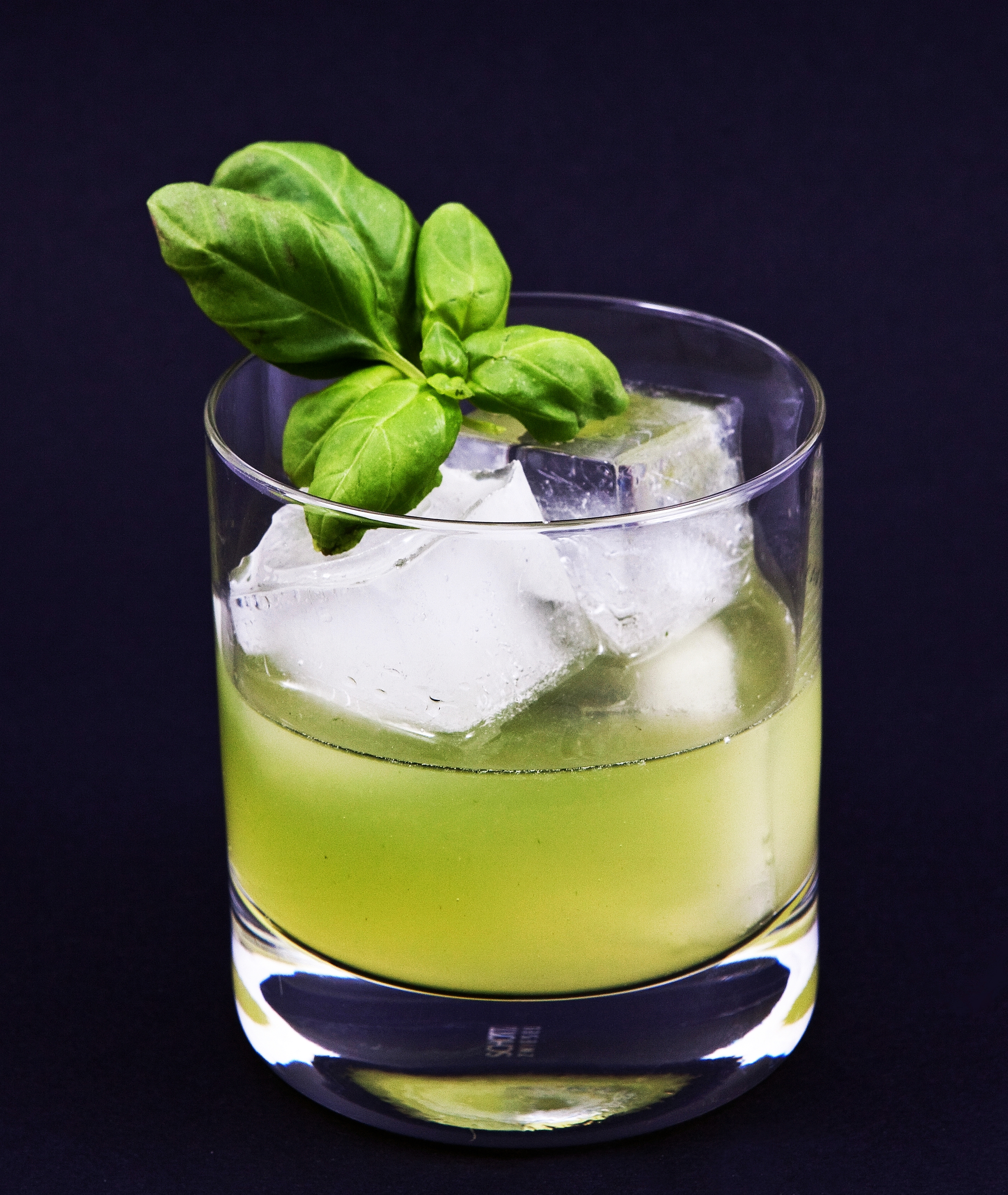
- Type: Cocktail
- Ingredients: 60 ml gin; 22.5 ml lemon juice; 22.5 ml simple syrup; 10 Genovese basil leaves
- Base spirit: Gin
- Standard drinkware: Cocktail glass
- Served: Straight up: chilled, without ice

The gin basil smash is a cocktail consisting of gin, lemon juice, simple syrup, and Genovese basil. It is a type of smash, a cocktail made of muddled fruit or herbs.

== History ==
The gin basil smash was created in 2008 by German bartender Jörg Meyer. Meyer first created and served the drink at his bar, Le Lion, in Hamburg, Germany. The gin basil smash was inspired by the Whiskey Smash. Meyer initially sold the drink as Gin Pesto before changing it to its current name.

== Preparation ==
The International Bartenders Association prescribes that all ingredients should be shaken in a shaker tin and then strained into a chilled cocktail glass. The drink may also be served on the rocks, rather than straight up, and garnished with a sprig of basil.

== See also ==
- List of cocktails
