= Missionary's downfall =

Tiki cocktail with rum, peach brandy, lime, honey, mint, and pineapple

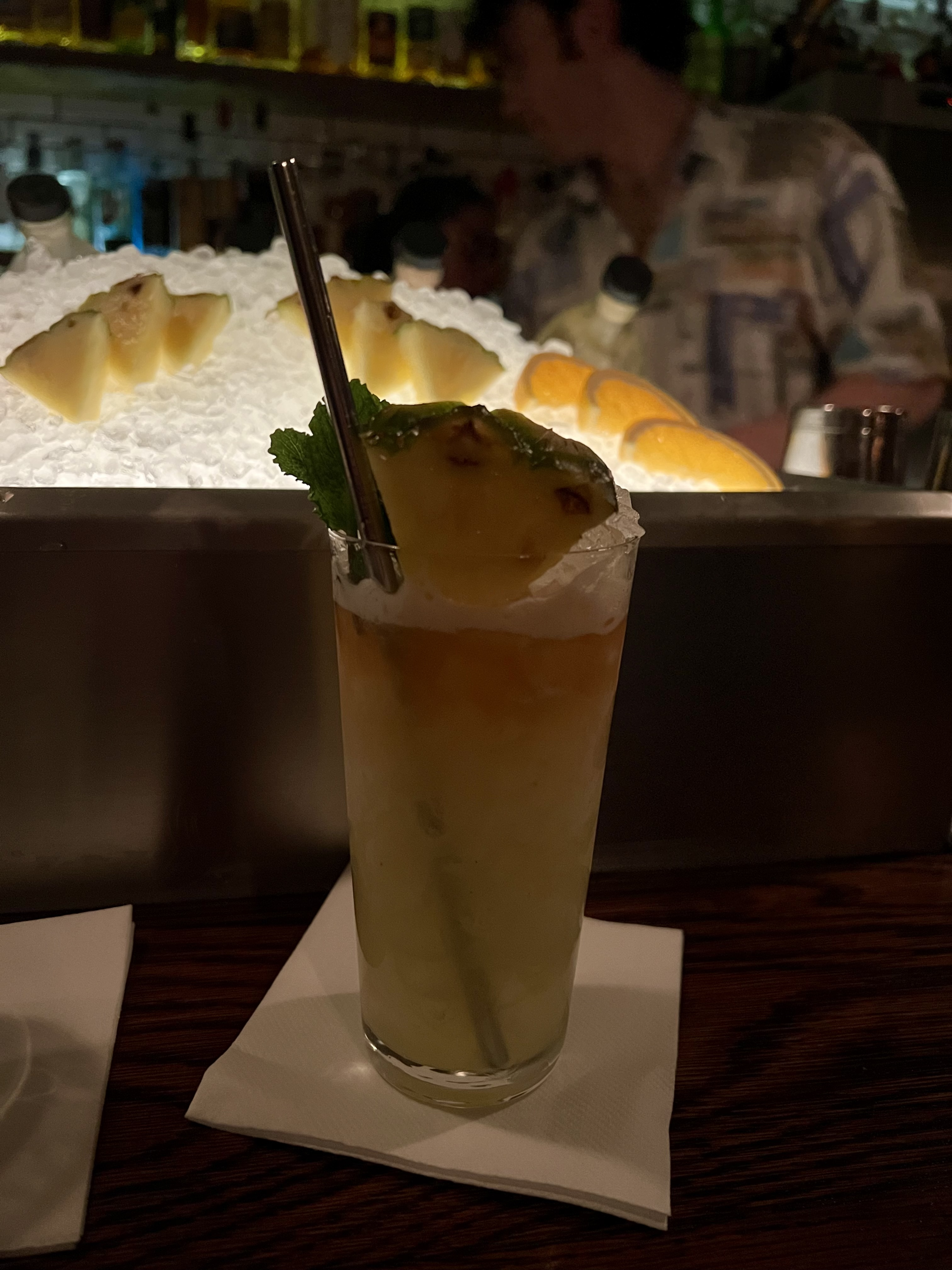
- A Missionary's downfall
- Type: Cocktail
- Ingredients: 30 mL white rum; 15 mL peach brandy; 15 mL fresh lime juice; 30 mL honey mix; 10 mint leaves; 3–4 pineapple chunks
- Standard garnish: Mint sprig and pineapple slice
- Preparation: Blend all ingredients with crushed ice and serve.

The Missionary's downfall is a tiki cocktail made with white rum, peach brandy, lime juice, honey, mint leaves, and pineapple.

== Preparation ==
All of the ingredients are blended with about half a cup of crushed ice and served in a large coupe. The drink is garnished with a mint sprig and a slice of pineapple.

== See also ==
- List of IBA official cocktails
- Tiki culture
