= Porto flip =

Type of cocktail

Porto Flip
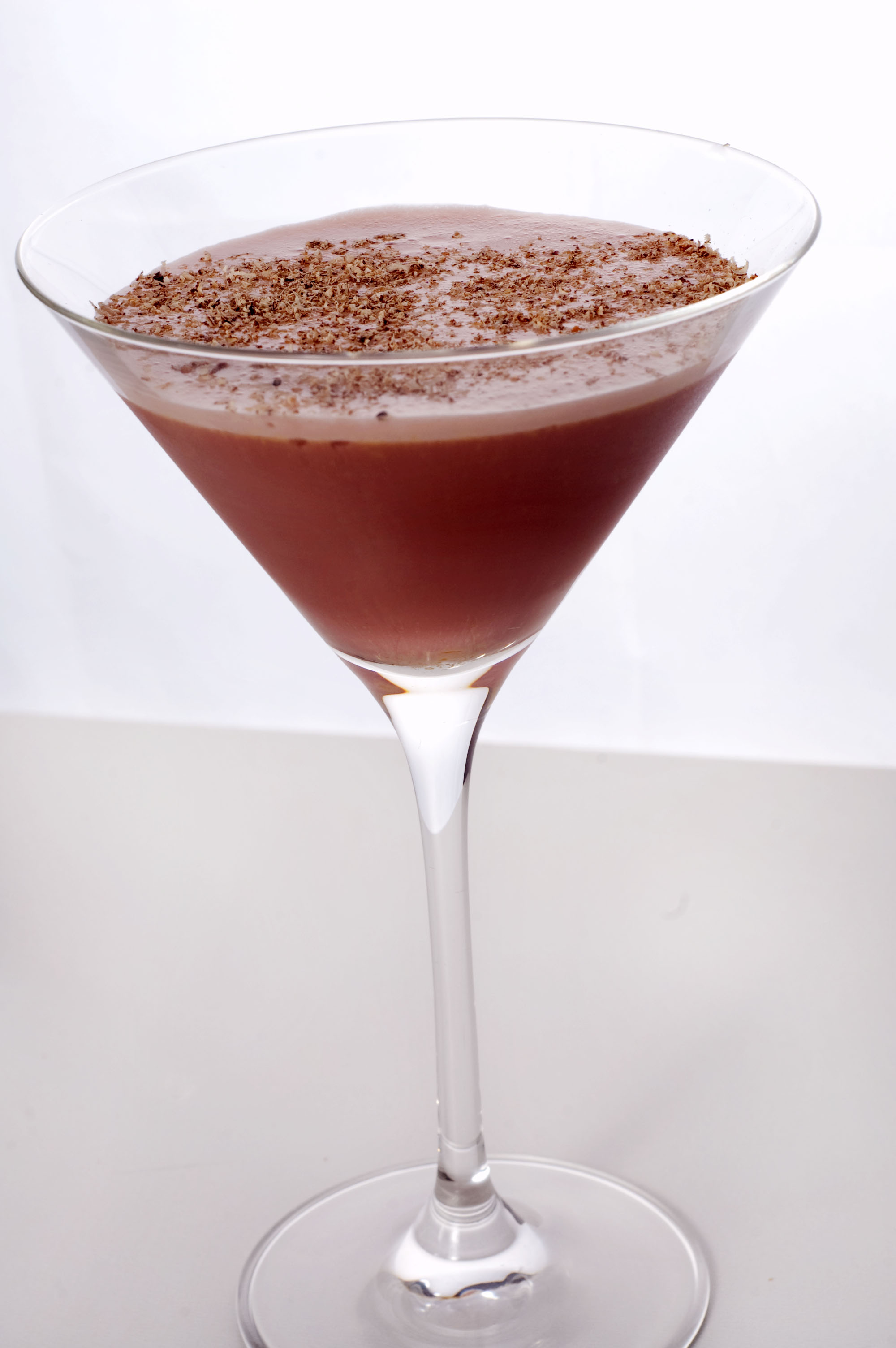
- Type: Cocktail
- Ingredients: 1.5 cl (3 parts) brandy; 4.5 cl (9 parts) port; 1 cl (2 parts) egg yolk
- Base spirit: Port
- Standard drinkware: Cocktail glass
- Standard garnish: Grated nutmeg
- Served: Straight up: chilled, without ice
- Preparation: Shake ingredients together in a mixer with ice. Strain into glass, garnish and serve

A Porto flip is a type of drink. It is typically made with brandy, ruby port, and one egg yolk.

The Porto Flip was first recorded by Jerry Thomas in his 1862 book The Bartender’s Guide: How to Mix Drinks; A Bon Vivant’s Companion. albeit under the name "Coffee Cocktail", named for its appearance rather than its ingredients.
