= Remember the Maine (cocktail) =

IBA official cocktail

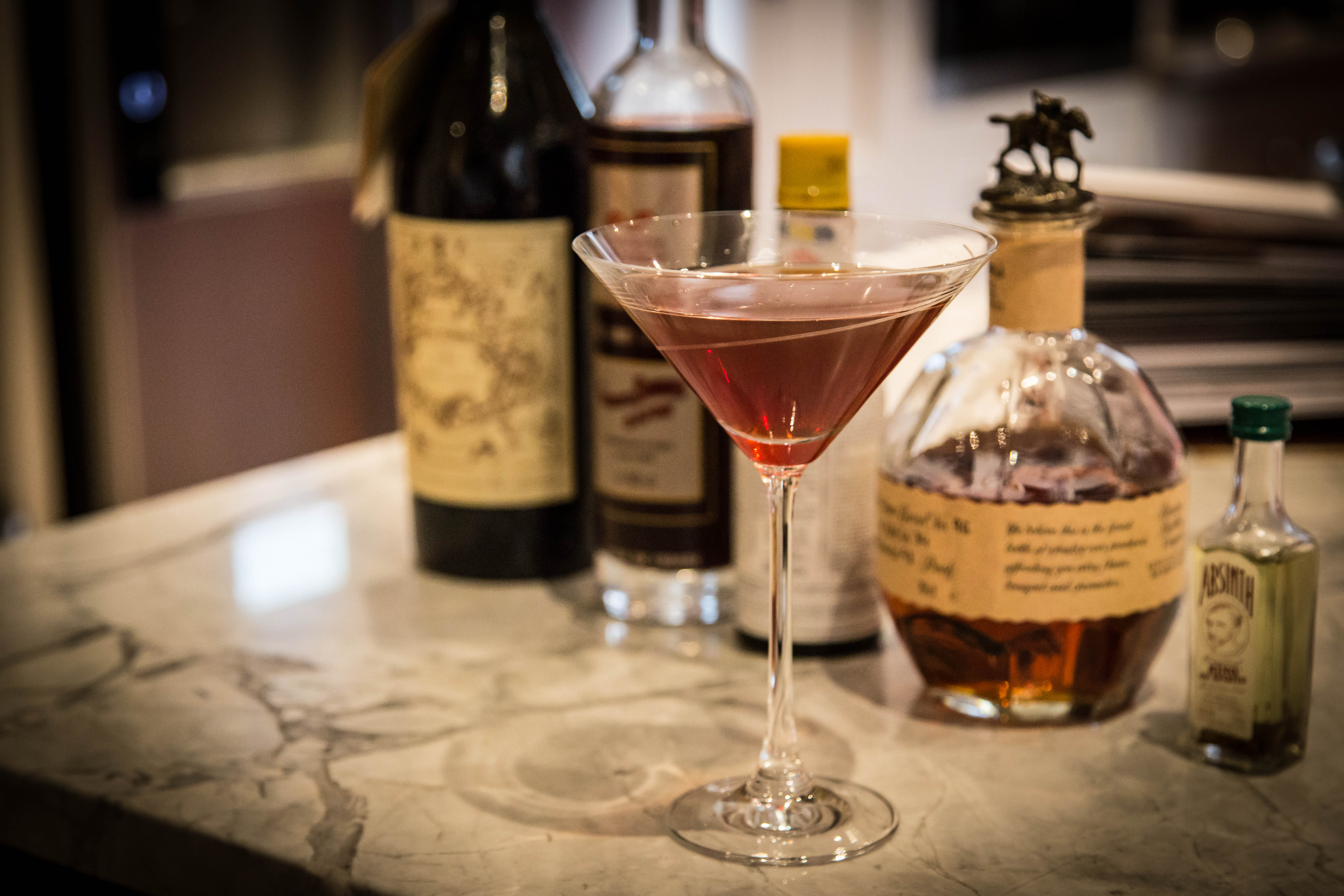
- A Remember the Maine cocktail
- Type: Mixed drink
- Ingredients: 60 ml Rye Whiskey; 22.5 ml Sweet Vermouth; 15 ml Cherry Brandy Luxardo; 7.5 ml Absinthe
- Standard drinkware: Champagne coupe
- Standard garnish: Lemon zest
- Served: Chilled
- Preparation: Coat coupe glass with absinthe. In a mixing glass, add other ingredients with ice, stir until chilled, and strain into coupe glass.

The Remember the Maine is an IBA official cocktail made with rye whiskey, cherry brandy, sweet vermouth, and absinthe. The Gentleman’s Companion, by Charles H. Baker, Jr. states that he encountered the cocktail in Havana, Cuba during the Cuban Revolution of 1933. The drink is classified as one of the Unforgettables by the IBA.

== History ==
The cocktail was first documented in Charles H. Baker Jr.'s The Gentleman's Companion (1939), where he describes it as a drink he enjoyed in Havana, Cuba, in 1933. The name references the phrase "Remember the Maine, to Hell with Spain!"—a rallying cry following the explosion of the USS Maine in Havana Harbor in 1898, an event that contributed to the start of the Spanish–American War. In 1935, Old Waldorf Astoria Bar Book wrote about a nearly identical cocktail called McKinley’s Delight (McKinley was also the president during the Maine incident).

== Preparation ==
Absinthe is poured into a coupe glass and swirled to coat the inside of the glass, then discarded. This glass is set aside. In a mixing glass, the whiskey, brandy, and vermouth are added, then the glass is filled three-quarters with ice. It is stirred until chilled. The mixture is strained into the coupe glass. The drink is garnished with lemon zest. Cherries can also be used as garnish.

== Variations ==
The Remember the Maine is similar to a Manhattan. Pastis can substitute the absinthe. Bourbon can substitute the rye whiskey. There are endless other variations, such as substituting the whiskey with tequila.

== See also ==
- List of cocktails
