= Pineapple juice =

Juice from the pineapple fruit

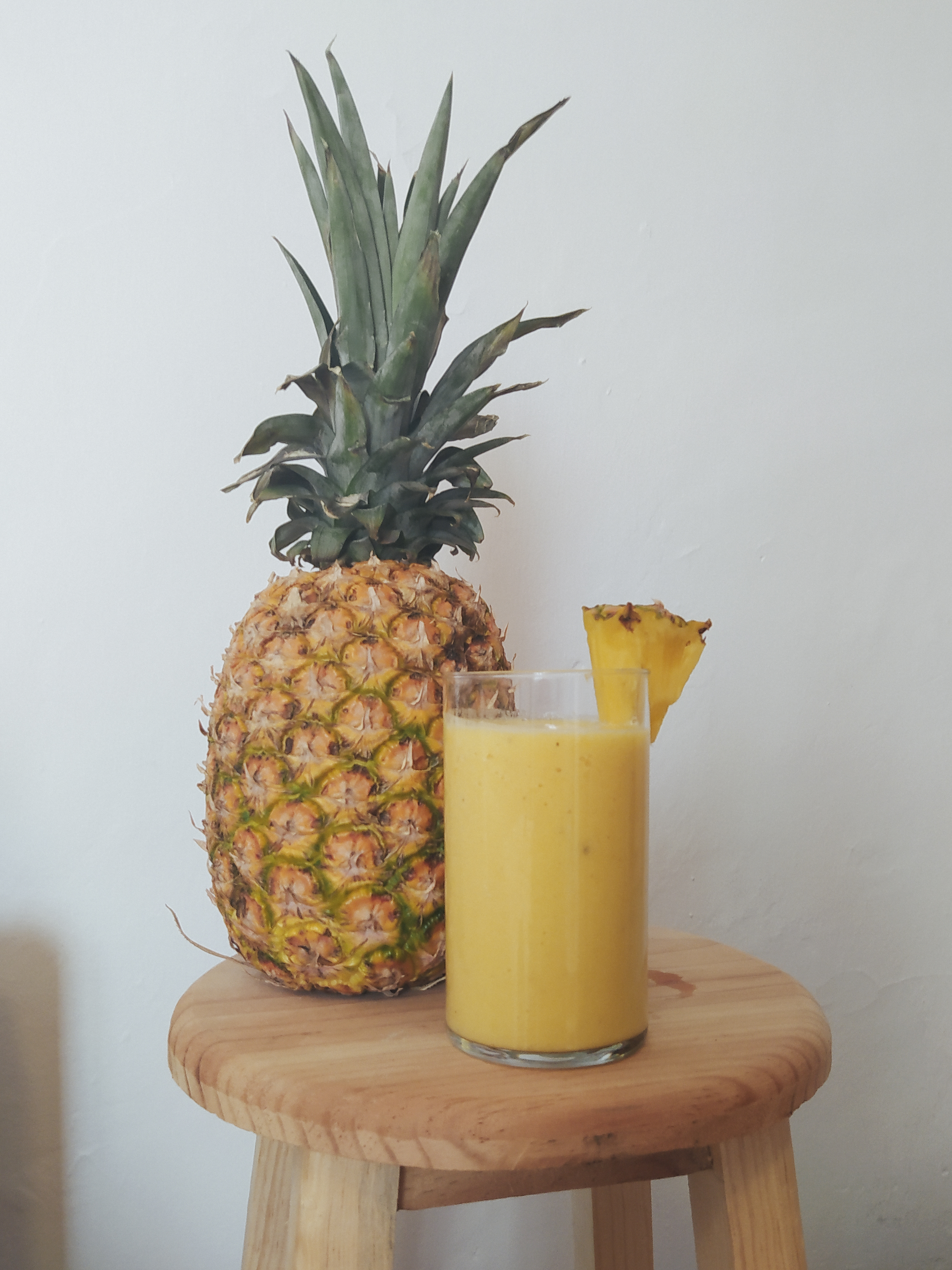
Pineapple juice in glass

Pineapple juice is a juice made from pressing the natural liquid out from the pulp of the pineapple (a fruit from a tropical plant). Numerous pineapple varieties may be used to manufacture commercial pineapple juice, the most common of which are Smooth Cayenne, Red Spanish, Queen, and Abacaxi. In manufacturing, pineapple juice is typically canned.

Pineapple juice is used as a single or mixed juice beverage, and for smoothies, cocktails, culinary flavor, and as a meat tenderizer. Pineapple juice is a main ingredient in the piña colada and tepache.

== History ==
There is no record of how or when pineapples arrived in Hawaii, with some accounts of pineapples being washed ashore from a Spanish or Portuguese shipwreck or brought ashore by sailors.The fruit may have arrived with the Spanish years before the arrival of Captain James Cook in 1778, but another source states the first pineapple was planted by Don Francisco de Paula Marin. While Marin was a horticulturalist who introduced many new plants to Hawaii, he may not have been the first person to introduce pineapples to Hawaii, but did describe pineapple planting in his journals in 1813.

Pineapple juice contributed to the success of the pineapple industry in the 1930s. In 1932, the Hawaiian Pineapple Company successfully developed a process of clarifying the juice, while capturing the aroma and flavor of the fruit. Large-scale cultivation of pineapples led to the formation of a pineapple commerce association which had strict production limits on the canning of whole, cut and crushed pineapple. Although industry members had agreed on these limitations in a 1934 pool agreement, the industry turned to canning of pineapple juice to expand commercial opportunities, while taking advantage of fruit juice as a new trend in breakfast drinks.

== Manufacturing ==
Pineapple juice is manufactured from ripe pineapples. To clean pineapples before juicing, a brush and spray cleaning machine is used to remove stains, imperfections and pesticide residue. After cleaning, the fruit is put into a pineapple peeling and extractor machine to obtain pulps which are put into a spiral juice extractor. A juice fine filter is then used to remove all solids, fiber and colloidal particles from the pineapple juice.

Sterilized pineapple juice is cooled to 50 °C (122 °F). Pasteurizing pineapple juice stops the enzymes that cause browning. Juice for export is typically concentrated to reduce shipping costs, then reconstituted with water later. The pineapple juice prepared for marketing is put into bottles or cans using a filling machine.

Pineapple juice powder is made by spraying pineapple juice on tapioca maltodextrin and leaving it to dry.

=== Quality ===
The quality of pineapple juice is assessed by its color (golden to amber), flavor, odor, content of pulp, levels for brix and acidity, pesticides, and microbial content. Imported juices are screened for heavy metals and additives.

Pineapple juice (canned, solids and liquids)
Nutritional value per 100 g (3.5 oz)
- Energy: 251 kJ (60 kcal)
- Carbohydrates: 15.7 g
- Sugars: 14.45 g
- Dietary fiber: 0.8 g
- Fat: 0.08 g
- Protein: 0.42 g
Vitamins and minerals
Vitamins	Quantity %DV^{†}
Thiamine (B1)	8% 0.1 mg
Riboflavin (B2)	2% 0.02 mg
Niacin (B3)	2% 0.28 mg
Pantothenic acid (B5)	3% 0.15 mg
Vitamin B6	4% 0.07 mg
Folate (B9)	1% 5 μg
Choline	1% 4.8 mg
Vitamin C	11% 9.5 mg
Minerals	Quantity %DV^{†}
Calcium	1% 14 mg
Copper	10% 0.09 mg
Iron	2% 0.28 mg
Magnesium	3% 14 mg
Manganese	49% 1.12 mg
Phosphorus	0% 6 mg
Potassium	4% 122 mg
Sodium	0% 1 mg
Zinc	1% 0.10 mg
- Other constituents: Quantity
- Water: 83.5 g
- Link to USDA Database entry
- ^{†}Percentages estimated using US recommendations for adults, except for potassium, which is estimated based on expert recommendation from the National Academies.

== Nutrition ==
Pineapple juice is 84% water, 16% carbohydrates, and contains negligible fat and protein (table). In a 100 ml (g) reference amount, pineapple juice supplies 60 calories, with only manganese in significant content (49% of the Daily Value, DV), while vitamin C content is moderate (table).

== Cooking ==
Pineapple juice powder can be used in pies, cakes, muffins, scones, chutneys, jams, chilis, candies, sauces, and stews. Pineapple juice powder can be used to marinate chicken and fish.

== Regulations ==
European Union regulations for pineapple juice cover food additives, pollutants, pesticide residues, microbial and heavy metal levels, packaging, and product labels. Food safety certification is required.

According to the U.S. Food and Drug Administration, manufactured and canned pineapple juice can have finely insoluble solids, although it cannot have coarse or hard substances or excessive pulp. It can be sweetened with a dry nutritive carbohydrate sweetener. In concentrated form, pineapple juice can be sweetened with a liquid.

== Market ==
In 2024, Europe accounted for more than 63% of global imports of single-strength pineapple juice and 51% of global imports of pineapple juice concentrate. European imports in 2024 were 292,489 tonnes (644,828,000 lb) valued at 397 million euros.

The Netherlands is the largest European importer and serves as an important distribution and re-export hub. Costa Rica was the largest supplier to Europe in 2024, exporting 113,576 tonnes.

The market has been affected by reduced pineapple harvests, rising prices, and droughts in major pineapple production countries.

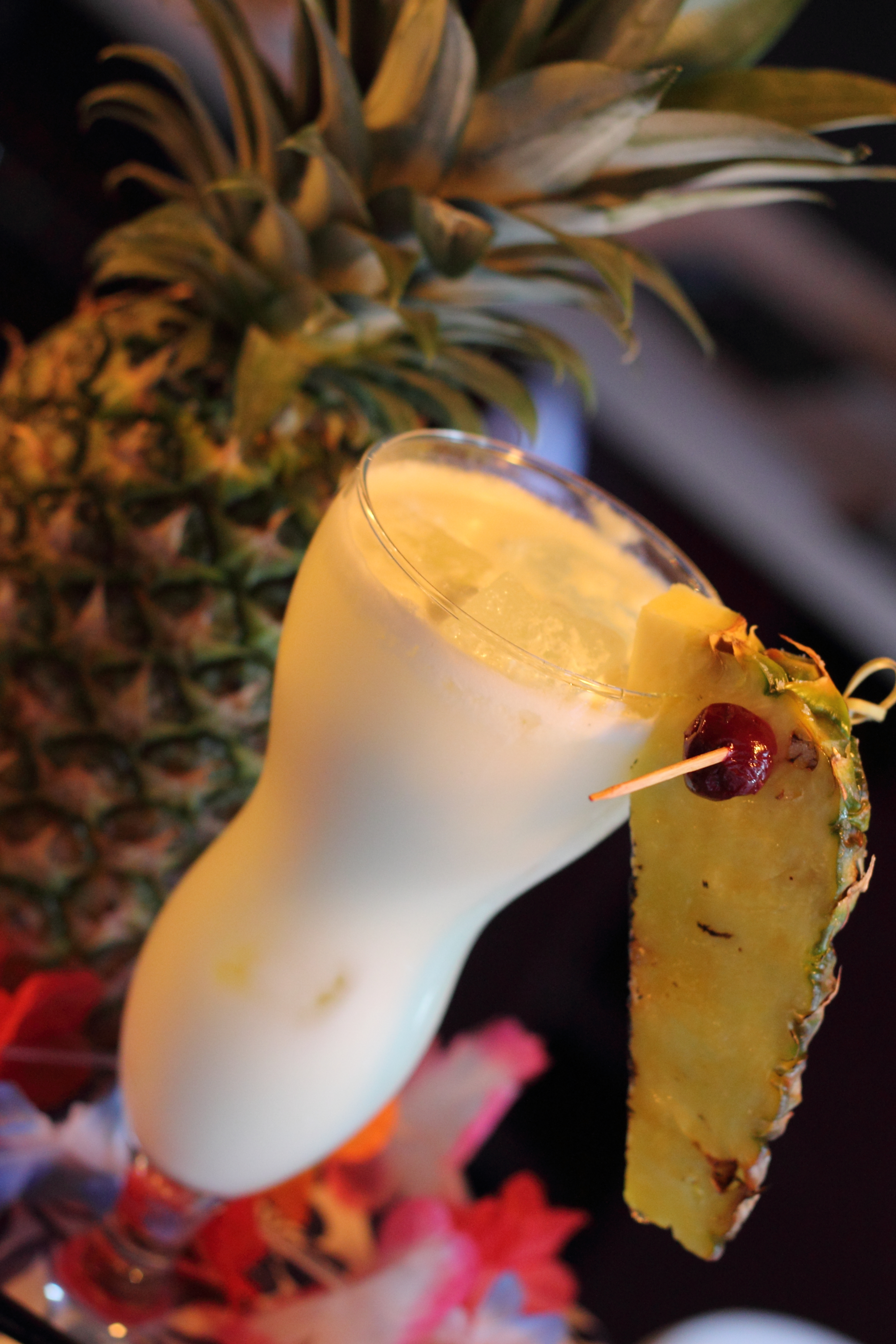
Piña colada with garnish

== Beverages ==
Tepache is made from the skin and core of pineapples, sugar cane and cinnamon. Developed in Puerto Rico as its national drink, the piña colada is a cocktail made with white rum, coconut cream, and pineapple juice. Developed in Singapore, the Singapore sling is a cocktail made with Gin, Cherry brandy, Cointreau, Bénédictine, lemon juice, pineapple juice and bitters. The Staten Island Ferry is a cocktail made of Malibu rum and pineapple juice.

== See also ==
- Juicing
- List of juices
- Pineapple juice cocktail
