= Grand Marnier =

Orange-flavored brandy liqueur

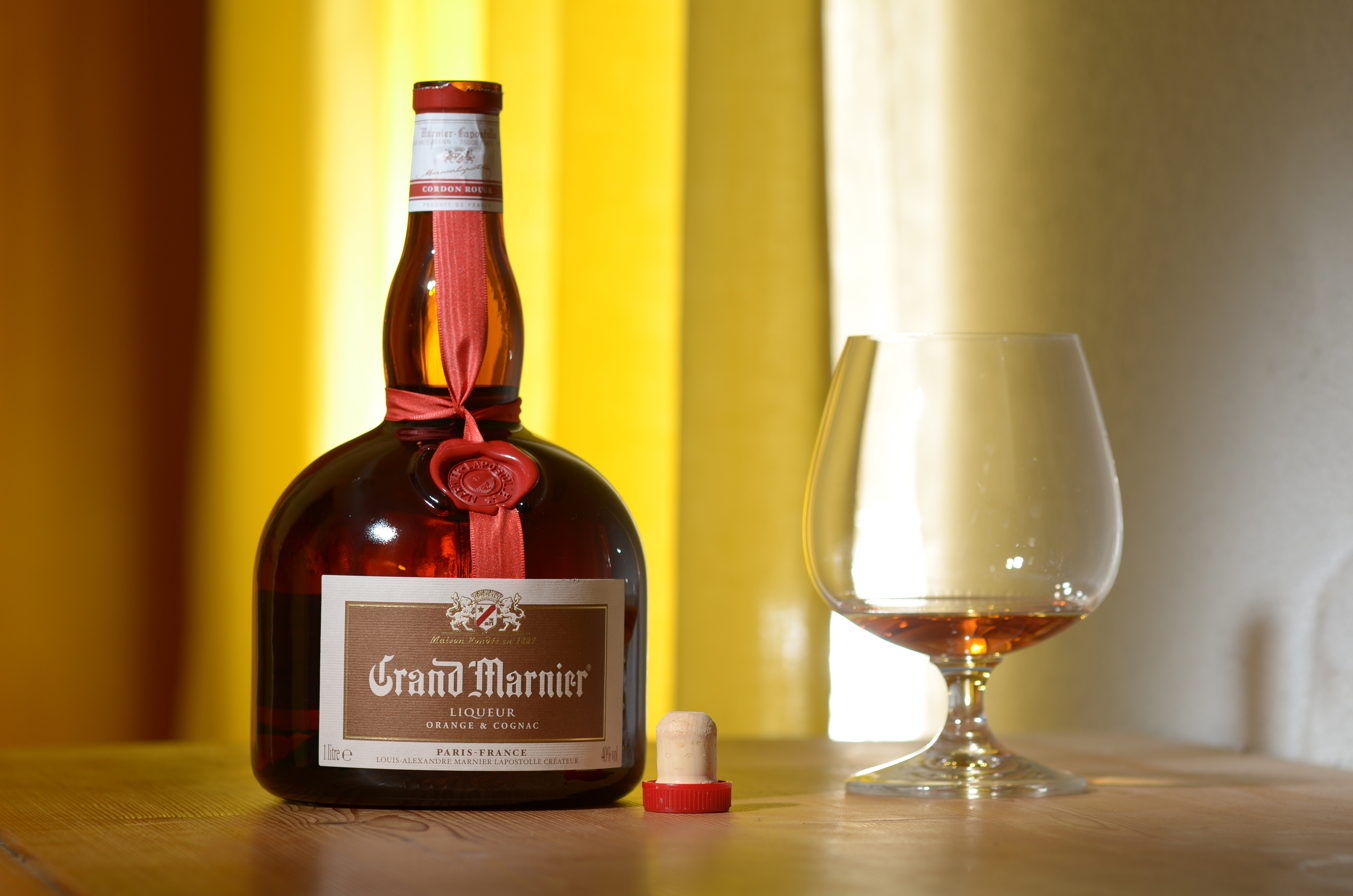
- Type: Curaçao
- Manufacturer: Marnier Lapostolle
- Origin: France
- Introduced: 1880
- Alcohol by volume: 40%
- Proof (US): 80° US / 70° UK
- Colour: Orange
- Flavour: Orange
- Website: www.grand-marnier.com

Grand Marnier (French pronunciation: [ɡʁɑ̃ maʁnje]) is a French brand of Curaçao liqueurs. The brand's best-known product is Grand Marnier Cordon Rouge, an orange-flavored liqueur created in 1880 by Alexandre Marnier-Lapostolle. It is made from a blend of Cognac brandy, distilled essence of bitter orange, and sugar, containing 40% alcohol (70 British proof/ 80 US proof). It is commonly consumed "neat" as a cordial or a digestif, and can be used in mixed drinks and desserts. Popular examples include crêpes Suzette and crêpes au Grand Marnier.

Aside from Cordon Rouge, the Grand Marnier line includes other liqueurs, most of which can be used similarly.

== History ==
According to its official website, Grand Marnier's first distillery was built in 1827 by Jean Baptiste Lapostolle in the village of Neauphle-le-Château. His granddaughter Julia married Louis-Alexandre Marnier in 1876, and four years later, the Marniers released a signature cognac with Haitian bitter orange.

Swiss hotelier César Ritz (1850–1918) reportedly came up with the name "Grand Marnier" for Marnier-Lapostolle, who in return helped him purchase and establish the Hotel Ritz Paris. During the extravagant Belle Époque, Grand Marnier was served in the Ritz Hotel as well as the Savoy Hotel. The brand has released anniversary editions of its well-known liqueur lines and became popular in the United States in the 1980s.

On 15 March 2016, the Campari Group announced a friendly takeover offer for Société des Produits Marnier Lapostolle S.A., the owner of Grand Marnier.

== Varieties ==
=== Cordon Rouge ===
Cordon Rouge ("Red Ribbon") is an orange-flavored cognac liqueur and the original Grand Marnier liqueur, created in 1880 by Alexandre Marnier-Lapostolle. It is consumed neat and is also used in mixed drinks and desserts.

==== Signature Series ====
- Natural Cherry – A blend of Grand Marnier Cordon Rouge with wild tropical Haitian and Dominican oranges and European Griotte cherries.
- Raspberry Peach – A blend of European raspberries and rare red peaches from Ardèche, in the South of France, combined with Grand Marnier Cordon Rouge.

=== Cordon Jaune ===
Cordon Jaune (Yellow Ribbon) was a triple-sec Curaçao-like liqueur that was made with neutral grain spirit instead of Cognac. The production stopped on 1 January 2017, after the company was taken over by Campari.

=== Cuvée du Centenaire ===
Cuvée du Centenaire ("Centennial Edition") was first released in limited quantities in 1927 to commemorate the 100th anniversary. It is made with up to 25-year-old fine cognacs and is consumed neat. On average, Cuvée du Centenaire is $145 per bottle.

=== Cuvée Spéciale Cent Cinquantenaire ===
The Cuvée Spéciale Cent Cinquantenaire ("Special Sesquicentennial Edition") was created in 1977 to honor the brand's 150th anniversary and is currently the most expensive variety of Grand Marnier. It is made with up to 50-year-old cognacs in frosted glass bottles featuring hand-painted Art Nouveau decorations. In 2005, it was marketed with the slogan "Hard to find, impossible to pronounce, and prohibitively expensive."

=== Cuvée Louis-Alexandre Marnier-Lapostolle ===
Cuvée Louis-Alexandre Marnier-Lapostolle is a special tribute to the founder of Grand Marnier, Louis-Alexandre Marnier Lapostolle. Made from 82% Cognac and 18% orange liqueur, it has a rich intensity of macerated citrus combined with the warming flavors of Cognac, pine, and Earl Grey tea on the finish.

== Uses ==
=== As a cordial ===
Grand Marnier is commonly consumed "neat" as a liqueur or a digestif.

=== In mixed drinks ===
Grand Marnier can be used in mixed drinks. It can be used as an alternative to Cointreau or triple sec, orange-flavored liqueurs made from neutral spirits. Some examples of these include the Cosmopolitan, Margarita, Sangria, Sidecar, and the B-52.

=== In food ===
Grand Marnier is used in the preparation of flambé dishes, such as crêpes Suzette, Grand Marnier soufflé, and crème brûlée. It can also be used in the sauce of the "Canard à l'orange" roasted duck dish. It is also an ingredient in several kinds of pastries, such as liquor cream buns and the French Christmas dessert known as Bûche de Noël (Yule log). It is frequently used in recipes for cranberry sauce, as its sweetness and citrus can contrast with the bitterness of cranberries. It can be used in some fruitcake recipes instead of brandy. It can also be drizzled over vanilla ice cream.

== Awards and recognition ==
In 2001, Grand Marnier's Cordon Rouge won the Gold Medal at the San Francisco World Spirits Competition. It was also awarded the 4 Star recommendation from F. Paul Pacult's Kindred Spirits in the Spirit Journal Guide.

Cuvée du Centenaire:

- 5-star recommendation from F. Paul Pacult's Kindred Spirits, the Spirit Journal Guide
- Double Gold medal at the San Francisco World Spirits Competition 2001
- Gold Medal at the San Francisco World Spirits Competition 2007

Cuvée Spéciale Cent Cinquantenaire:

- "Best of the Best" Spirits in the Robb Report
- 5-star recommendation from F. Paul Pacult's Kindred Spirits, the Spirit Journal Guide
- Gold Medal at the Salon des Arts Ménagers 1983 – Brussels
- "Best Liqueur” at the San Francisco World Spirits Competition 2001
- Double Gold Medal at the San Francisco World Spirits Competition 2007

== See also ==
- Cointreau
- Triple Sec
- Curaçao (liqueur)
