= Cointreau =

Brand of triple sec

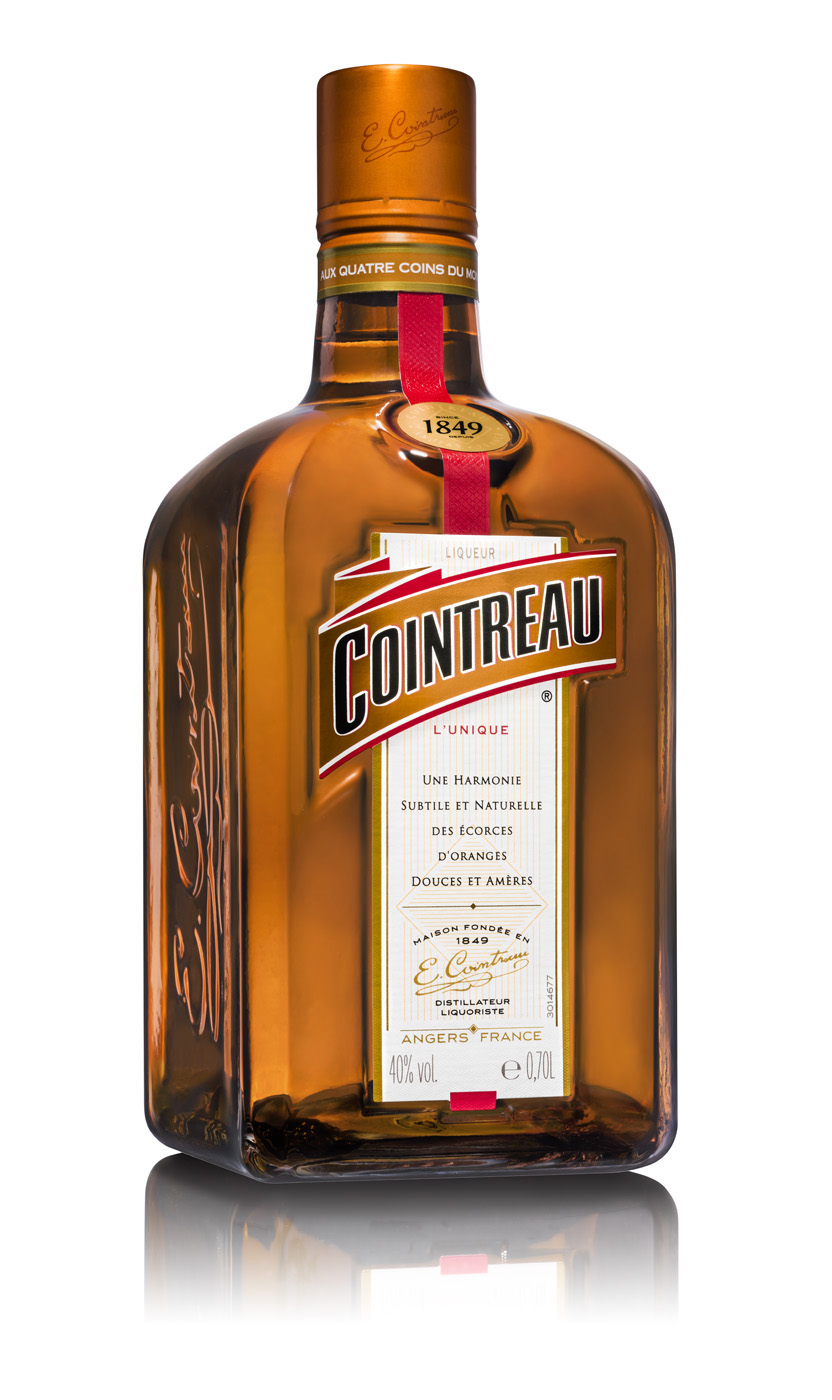
- Type: Orange liqueur (triple sec)
- Manufacturer: Rémy Cointreau
- Origin: France
- Introduced: 1849
- Alcohol by volume: 40%
- Proof (US): 80
- Colour: Colourless
- Flavour: Orange
- Variants: Cointreau Noir
- Website: www.cointreau.com

Cointreau (UK: /ˈkwɒntroʊ, ˈkwɑːn-/, US: /kwɑːnˈtroʊ, kwæ̃ˈ-/, French: [kwɛ̃tʁo]) is a brand of orange-flavoured triple sec liqueur produced in Saint-Barthélemy-d'Anjou, France. It is consumed as an apéritif and digestif, and is a component of several well-known cocktails. It was originally called Curaçao Blanco Triple Sec. Despite the orange bottle, Cointreau is colourless. Cointreau also produces Cointreau Noir, a blend of 70% Cointreau and 30% cognac from the House of Rémy Martin. Though the term Cointreau is usually used to refer to the triple sec liqueur itself, the specific term Cointreau L'Unique may be used to distinguish it from related products, such as the aforementioned Cointreau Noir.

== Production ==
Cointreau Distillery was set up in 1849 by Adolphe Cointreau, a confectioner, and his brother Édouard-Jean Cointreau. Their first success was the cherry liqueur Guignolet, but they also found success blending sweet and bitter orange peels with pure alcohol from sugar beets. The first bottles of Cointreau were sold in 1875. Today, an estimated 13 million bottles are sold each year, in more than 150 countries. Ninety percent of production is exported. Cointreau & Cie SA was family-owned until 1990, when it merged with Rémy Martin to form Rémy Cointreau, now a publicly traded company.

The production methods and recipe are a family secret, but the facility offers public tours. Photography is restricted in many areas to protect the production process from being copied.

== Cocktails ==
In addition to being consumed neat (or often on ice), Cointreau is used in many popular cocktails. The official IBA recipes for the Corpse Reviver #2 and the Cosmopolitan include Cointreau. When mixed with water, Cointreau exhibits the Ouzo effect.

== Publicity ==
In the 1980s, Avirex, now Cockpit USA, issued an A-2 limited-edition leather flight jacket featuring Cointreau Original Margarita nose art on the back. In early 2008, the burlesque entertainer Dita Von Teese became the new face of Cointreau's "Be Cointreauversial" advertising and marketing campaign, a campaign created in 2003 by the New York advertising agency KraftWorks. The product's "MargaRight" advertising campaign began in 2023 with Aubrey Plaza as its spokesperson.

== See also ==
- Grand Marnier
