= Triple sec =

Type of orange liqueur

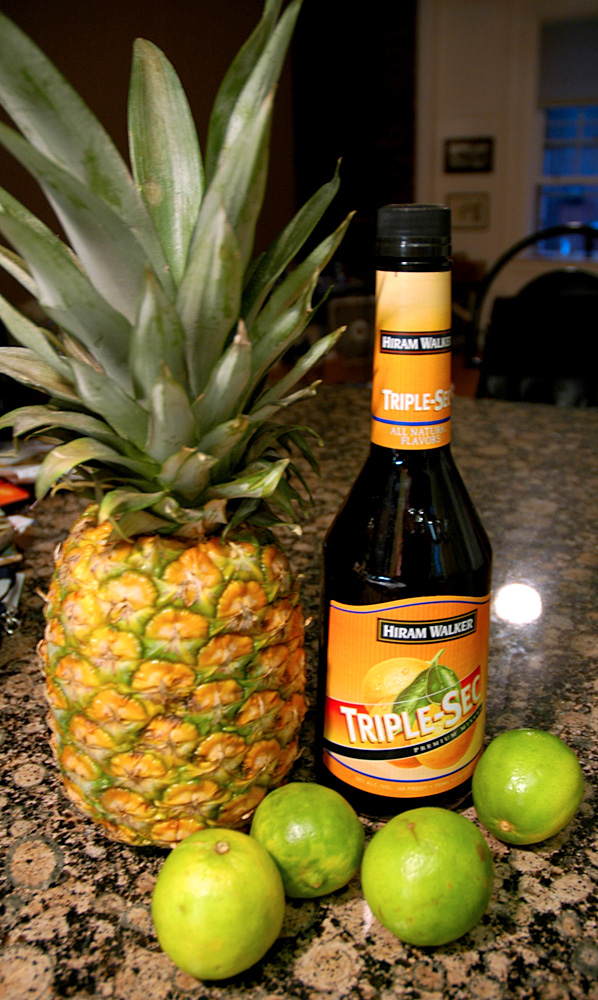
- Type: Liqueur
- Origin: France
- Introduced: 19th century
- Alcohol by volume: 20%-40%
- Proof (US): 40-80° US / 35-70° UK
- Color: Clear; golden; blue
- Flavor: Orange

Triple sec is an orange-flavoured liqueur that originated in France. It usually contains 20–40% alcohol by volume.

Triple sec is rarely consumed neat, but is used in preparing many mixed drinks such as margaritas, cosmopolitans, sidecars, Long Island iced teas, and mai tais.

== Etymology ==
The origin of the name triple sec is disputed. The term is French and composed of triple, with the same meaning as in English, and sec, the French word for "dry". Some sources claim that it came from a triple distillation process used to create the liqueur, but others say that a triple distillation is not used. Cointreau, a brand of triple sec, is reported to have invented the term based on the three types of orange peels used in the liqueur, although other reports have Cointreau claim the triple to mean "three times the flavour of Curaçaos".

== History ==
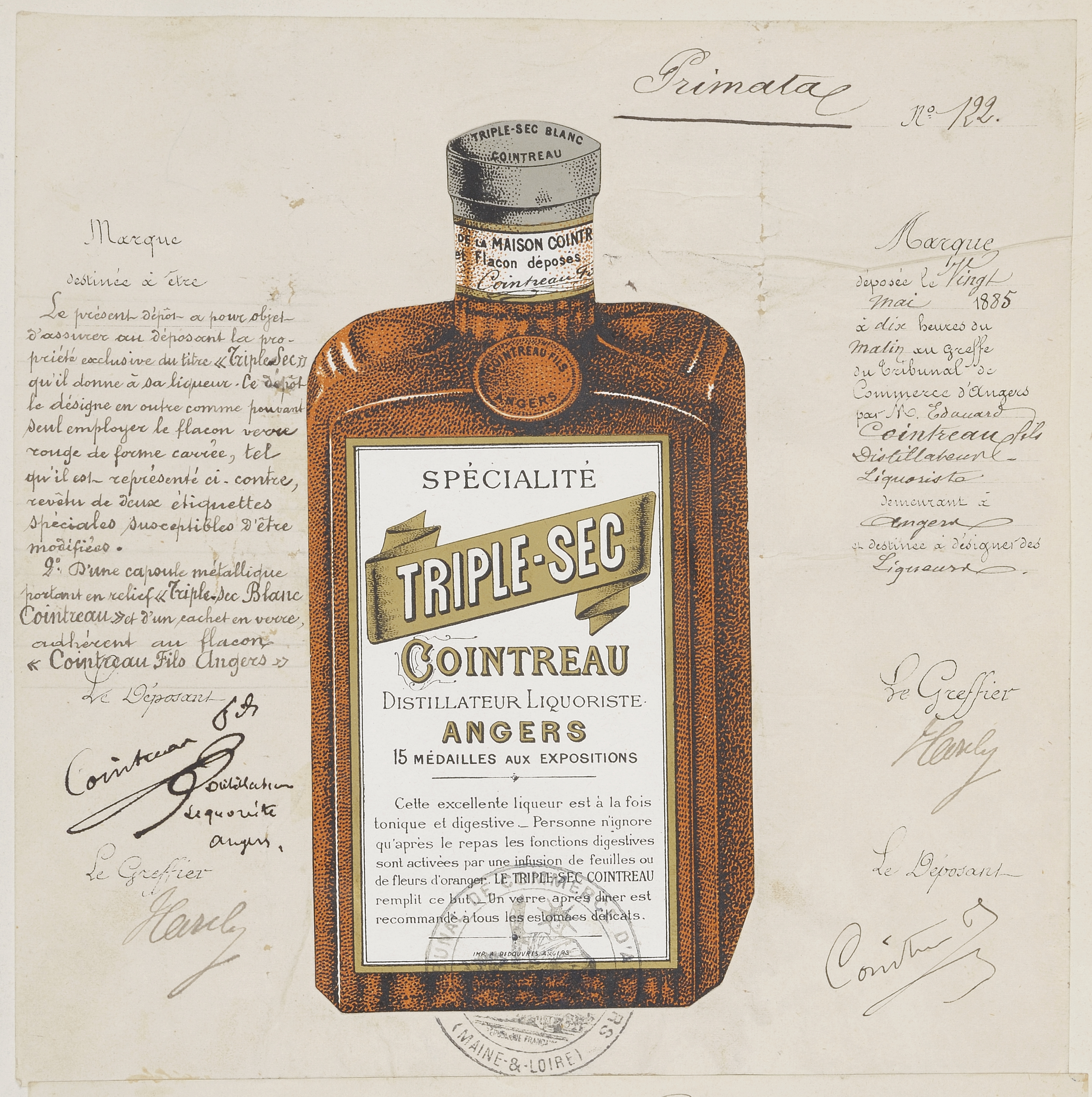
May 1885 trademark application for Cointreau triple sec liqueur

Triple sec has been popular for more than 150 years. The Dutch East India Company created orange liqueurs by steeping dried orange peels from places such as the island of Curaçao. Unlike the modern-day triple sec, which contains only the flavour of orange peel, the Dutch version includes herbs and spices, and comes in a variety of colours such as clear, orange, and blue.

The Combier distillery claims that Jean-Baptiste Combier and his wife Josephine invented triple sec in 1834, in their kitchen in Saumur, France. The liqueur was made by sun-drying the various orange peels. After at least 48 hours, they would begin distilling this mixture in copper pots. Lastly, they would put it through a third distillation to purify the flavour.

In 1875, Cointreau created its version of triple sec and calls it one of the most popular brands. Triple sec gained popularity and was widely known by 1878; at the Exposition Universelle of 1878 in Paris, several distillers were offering "Curaço [sic] triple sec", as well as "Curaço doux".

There has been recent innovation in the world of triple sec outside of France. Due to the popularity of the margarita, other triple sec citrus liquors have been created. In 2024, Mexican distiller Hillhamn Salome distilled a Mexican triple sec using a neutral grain-based liquor, rather than sugar beet, with sweet and bitter oranges, mandarins, and pomelos. Flor de Azar has become known in cocktail circles in both the US and Mexico for its variety of citrus fruits and Mexican origin. Instead of sweetening with traditional sugar beet or cane sugar, the product is sweetened with agave syrup.

== Production ==
Triple sec is usually made from a spirit derived from sugar beets (used for its neutral flavor), in which orange peel is steeped. The oranges are harvested when their skin is still green and not fully ripened, so the essential oils remain in the skin rather than the fruit's flesh. The spirit is redistilled and mixed with more neutral spirit, water, and powdered beet sugar to produce the final liqueur. This process creates a spirit with a robust, distinct orange flavour.

== See also ==
- List of orange liqueurs
