= International Bartenders Association =

Professional association founded 1951

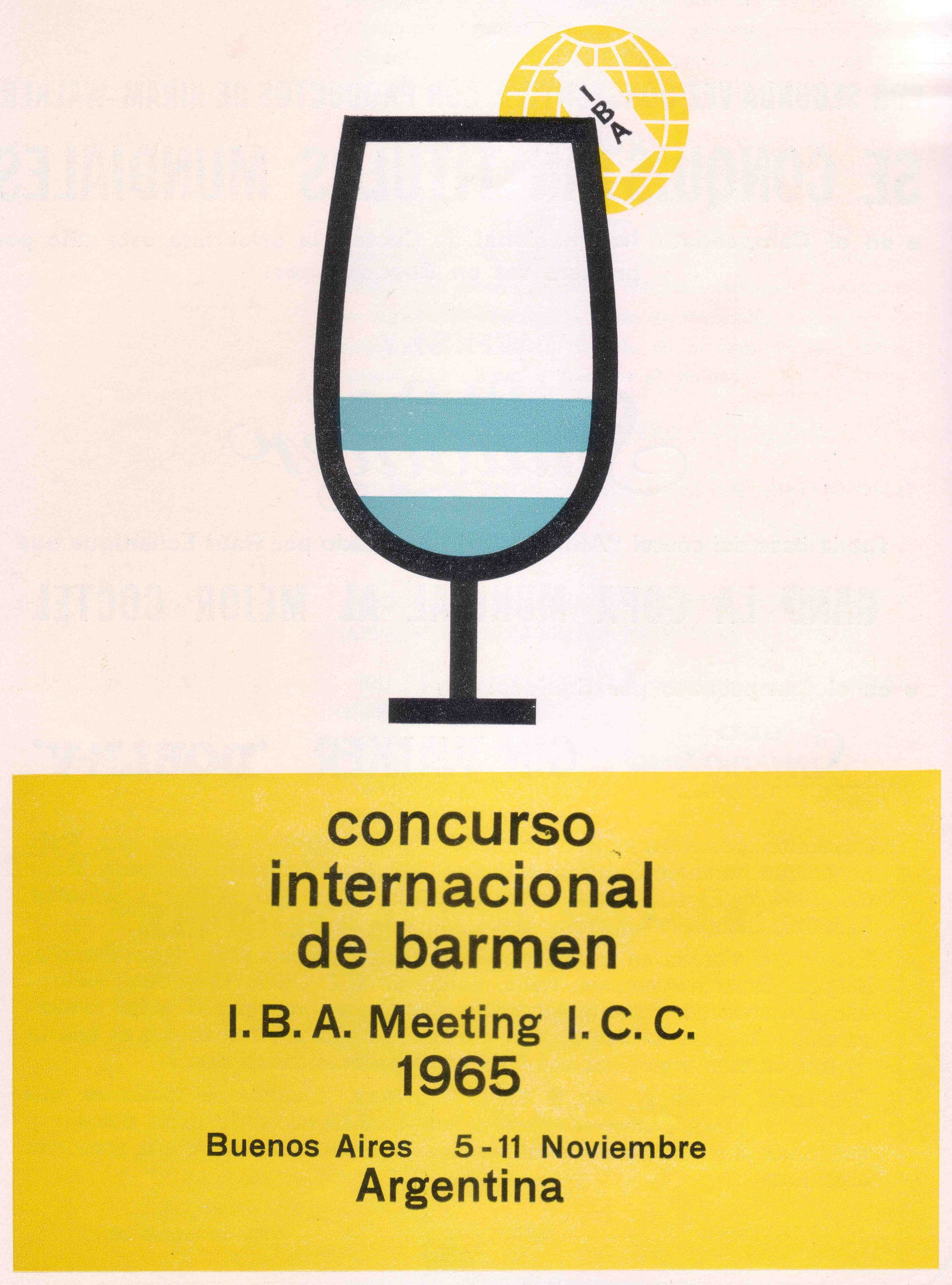
A poster for the IBA meeting of 1965 at the Claridge Hotel, Buenos Aires.

The International Bartenders Association (IBA) is an international organisation that represents bartenders. It was founded on 24 February 1951.

The IBA hosts an annual event featuring the World Cocktail Competition (WCC) and the World Flairtending Competition (WFC). The IBA also sanctions a list of official cocktails.

== See also ==
- List of IBA official cocktails
