= Old fashioned glass =

Short tumbler used for serving spirits

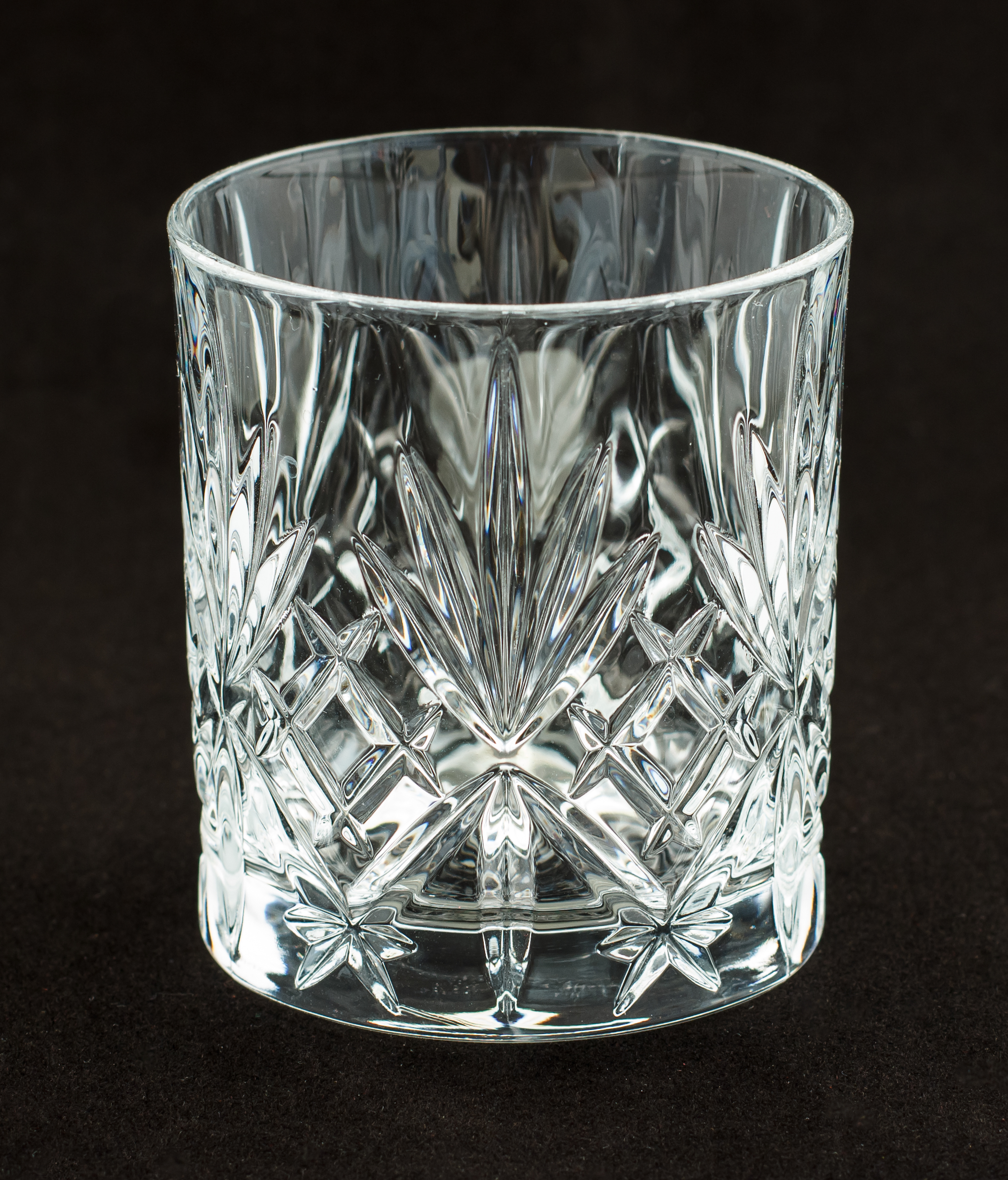
- An old fashioned glass, traditionally used for serving spirits
- Type: Mixed drink

The old fashioned glass, otherwise known as the rocks glass, whiskey glass, and lowball glass (or simply lowball), is a short tumbler used for serving spirits, such as whisky, neat or with ice cubes ("on the rocks"). It is also normally used to serve certain cocktails, such as the old fashioned. The true old fashioned glass is decorated in the cut glass style, although most modern examples are pressed glass, made using a mold. The form originated in the 17th and 18th centuries from the Scottish quaich, a shallow two-handled vessel made of materials such as wood, silver, and leather. Beginning in the 19th century, these ornately-decorated cups were slowly replaced by the glass tumbler, which had greater mass appeal and were cheaper to produce. Plain glass versions are lowball glasses.

Old fashioned glasses typically have a wide brim and a thick base, so that the non-liquid ingredients of a cocktail can be mashed using a muddler before the main liquid ingredients are added.

Old fashioned glasses usually hold 180–300 ml (6–10 US fl oz). A double old fashioned glass (sometimes referred to by retailers as a DOF glass) holds 350–470 ml (12–16 US fl oz).
