= Bartending terminology =

Terms used in drinking culture and bartending

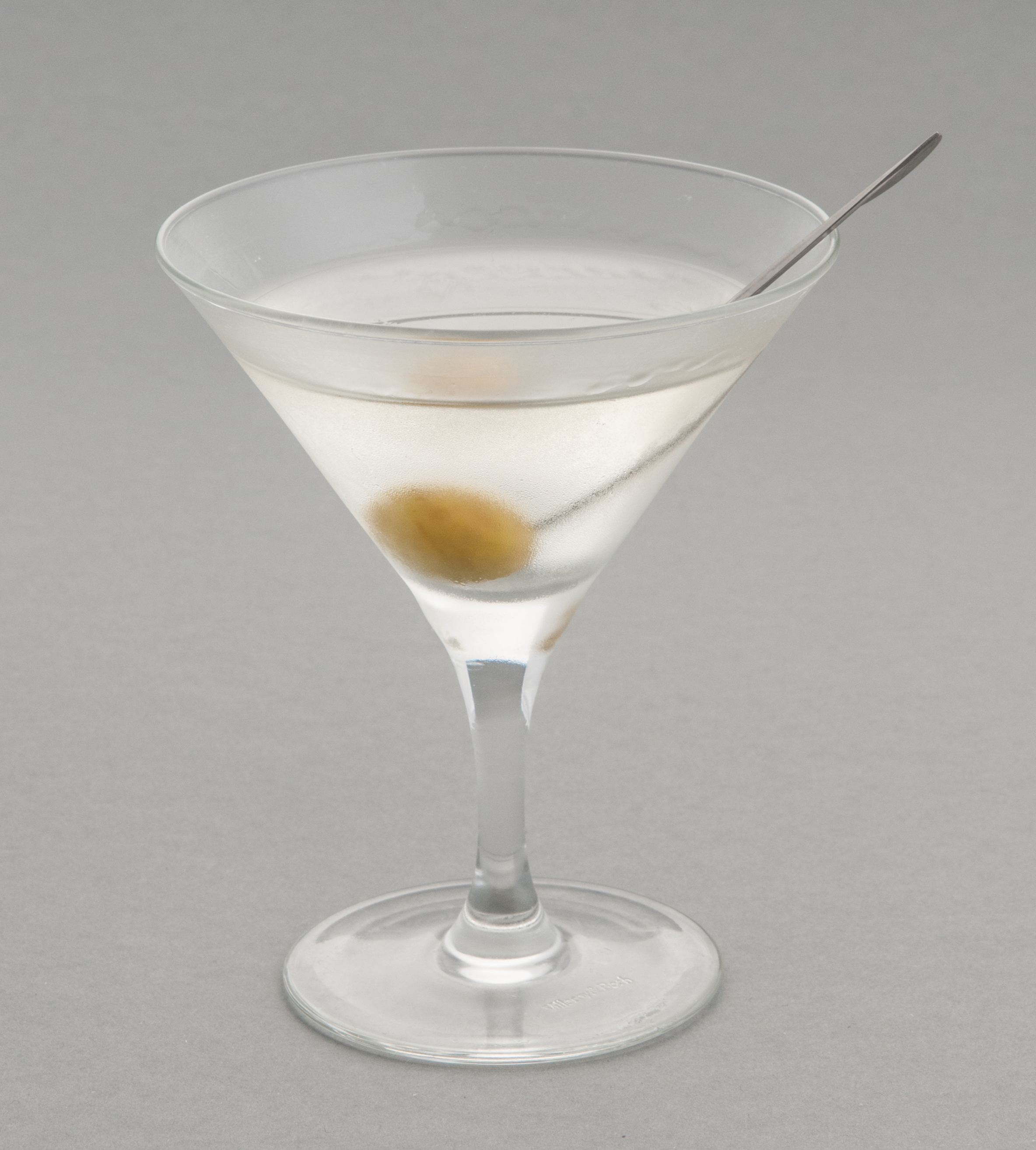
A martini served straight up with an olive

Bartending involves the provision of beverages from a bar, nightclub or other establishment that serves alcohol. This article discusses English language terminology used to specify beverage orders in these or similar situations, such as waiting in a restaurant or event.

== Definitions and usage ==
=== Straight, up, and straight up ===
In bartending, the terms "straight up" and "up" ordinarily refer to an alcoholic drink that is shaken or stirred with ice and then strained and served in a stemmed glass without ice. "Straight" ordinarily refers to a single, unmixed liquor served without any water, ice, or other mixer. In this sense, "straight" can sometimes be used as a synonym for either "straight up" or "neat".

Furthermore, "straight" is also a term of art for a particular type of whiskey produced in the United States. United States federal law defines the term "straight whiskey" as whiskey that has met particular requirements for its ingredients, production process, and aging. For example, the label of a bottle of top-shelf bourbon typically identifies the product as "Kentucky straight bourbon whiskey".

While the meaning of "up" and "neat" is ordinarily clear, some clarification may be needed for "straight" and "straight up", to determine whether the spirit is intended to be chilled and strained or served undiluted at room temperature.

Unmixed liquors may be served either neat, up, or on the rocks, with differing conventions. High-quality whisky and other aged liquor are most often served neat, while lower-quality whisky is usually served with a mixer or on the rocks. Vodka can be stored as a liquid well below the freezing point of water because of its high proof and low particulate content, and cocktails made with sub-freezing vodka are sometimes requested to minimize the amount of added water from melted ice during shaking.

=== Neat ===
A drink served "neat" is a single, unmixed liquor served without being chilled and without any water, ice, or other mixer. Neat drinks are typically served in a rocks glass, shot glass, snifter, Glencairn glass, or copita.

=== On the rocks ===
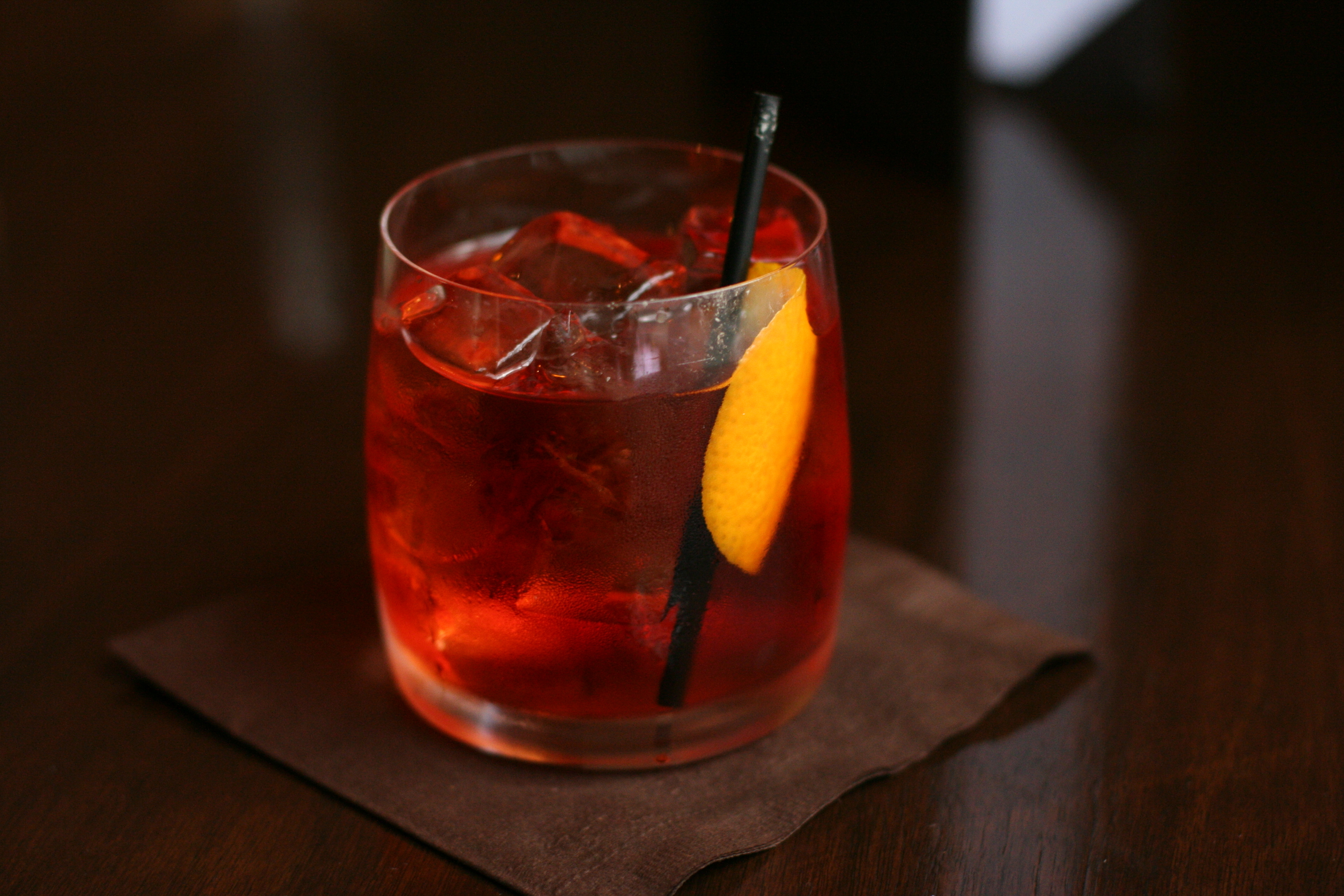
A negroni cocktail with an orange twist served on the rocks

"On the rocks" refers to liquor poured over ice cubes, and a "rocks drink" is a drink served on the rocks. Rocks drinks are typically served in a rocks glass, highball glass, or Collins glass, all of which refer to a relatively straight-walled, flat-bottomed glass; the rocks glass is typically the shortest and widest, followed by the highball which is taller and often narrower, then the Collins which is taller and narrower still.

=== Garnish ===
"With a twist" signals the bartender to add a "twist" of the peel of a citrus fruit to the cocktail. Often, the bartender will hang the rind of the citrus on the glass as a garnish.

=== Cocktails ===
Cocktails are generally served chilled, although some (e.g., margaritas) may be served either with or without ice, and this must be specified. Cocktails can be served "frozen", which is with crushed ice or blended with ice instead of cubes. Some cocktails, for example hot toddy, are served hot.

=== Chaser ===
A "chaser" is a usually non-alcoholic drink that is consumed immediately after taking a shot or a sip of a stronger alcohol. This is meant to mitigate the intense or bitter taste of the alcohol and are often sweet, like juice or a soft drink. A relatively new type of chaser is called "pickleback" wherein a shot of liquor is chased by a shot of pickle brine.

In Israel, a chaser is simply a smaller version of a shot.

=== Call Drink ===
"Call drink" is a cocktail where a customer specifies the brand of liquor to be used while making it, referred to as the drink being "on call". This is opposed to a house drink which is made with the default brand of spirits for the bar.

=== Other terms ===
- Bartender's spoon: A spoon, usually at least 30 cm (12 in) long, very often with a spiralled handle, holding between a dash (about .46 ml) and 1/4 US fl oz (7.4 ml), and used for stirring cocktails and measuring ingredients. The other side often ends with a fork for poking fruit out of a syrupy dessert.
- Dash: 1/8th teaspoon (about .46 ml)
- Salty rim: A glass with a salty rim is used for cocktails in which it is desired to enhance the drink's taste with saltiness. Examples include the margarita and the salty dog (which without the salty rim is a Greyhound). The rim of the glass is wetted with, e.g., a lime wedge, and then the glass is rubbed against a surface on which salt has been poured, so the salt will stick to it.
- Shaken: Aerated and textured.

== Well and top-shelf ==
Drinks establishments will often have a lower-priced category of drinks, known as "well drinks" or "rail drinks", and a higher-priced category known as "top-shelf" or "call" drinks, and will use upselling by offering the higher-priced category when taking orders. The terms come from the relative positions of the bottles of spirit used for the drinks; the cheapest version of a spirit offered by a bar is typically stored in a long rail or "well" making it readily available to a busy bartender, while the more expensive, better-quality liqueurs and spirits are displayed on shelves behind the bar where they attract patrons to the available selection.

== Sizes ==
Alcoholic beverages are sold in a wide variety of sizes, for example:

- A "pony" is slang for one US fluid ounce (30 ml) of spirit, while in the US the standard-size "shot" of alcohol is a 1.5-US-fluid-ounce (44 ml) "jigger", with a "double" being three US fluid ounces (89 ml).
- A "middy", commonly known as a "pot" in Queensland and Victoria, Australia, is 10 imperial fluid ounces (284 ml).
- A "schooner" may refer to various glasses for beer, typically of size 15 imperial fluid ounces (426 ml) in Australia, or 2/3 imperial pint (379 ml) in the United Kingdom.
- A "pint" (20 imperial fluid ounces or 568 millilitres) or half-pint is the universal measure for draft beer in the UK.

Rather than use measuring equipment, professional bartenders usually use a pour spout inserted into the mouth of the bottle, which restricts the flow of liquid to a standard rate allowing reasonably accurate time-based pours. For instance, a "6-count" is a common analogue for a 1.5oz jigger, which can be trained to by having the bartender upend the bottle (with pour spout installed) and counting to 6 out loud as quickly as the words can be said clearly. This method breaks down into convenient sub-measures; each count is approximately one-quarter fluid ounce, making a "pony" 4 counts and a "half-jigger" 3 counts. This system is not perfect because liquids of different viscosities will pour at different rates through the same spout, but it does allow consistent pours from drink to drink for a consistent result from each bartender, while being much faster than using a thimble measure or similar spirit measure.

== See also ==
- Distilled beverage
- List of cocktails
