= Cocchi =

Cocchi is a surname of Italian origin. It is derived from the patronymic or plural version of name Cocco, which means 'egg' or 'dear person' in Italian. The surname was most prevalent in the Italian region Emilia-Romagna.

Notable people with the surname include:

- Antonio Cocchi Donati (1450–1491), Italian jurist
- Antonio Cocchi (1695–1758), Italian physician, naturalist and writer
- Benito Cocchi (1934–2016), Roman Catholic archbishop
- Francesco Cocchi (1788–1865), Italian painter and scenic designer
- Ginepro Cocchi (born Antonio Cocchi, 1908–1939), Italian Roman Catholic priest
- Gioacchino Cocchi (c. 1720–1804), Italian composer
- Igino Cocchi (1827–1913), Italian geologist and palaeontologist
- Matteo Cocchi (born 2007), Italian footballer
- Pompeo Cocchi (fl. 1523), Italian painter
- Riccardo Cocchi (born 1977), eight-time Latin Dance Champion

== See also ==
- Cocchi Americano, a quinine-laced aperitif wine produced by Giulio Cocchi Spumanti
- Cocci, plural of coccus, any bacterium or archaeon that has a spherical, ovoid, or generally round shape
- Giulio Cocchi Spumanti, an Italian winery
- Obelisks of the Corsa dei Cocchi, two marble monuments located in Florence, Italy
- Palazzo Cocchi-Serristori, a Renaissance-style palace in Florence, Italy
- Cocchi (コッチ, Kotchi), a character from Chi's Sweet Home
