= Joe Gilmore =

Northern Irish bartender and cocktail inventor (1922–2015)

Joseph "Joe" Patrick Gilmore
- Born: 19 May 1922; Belfast, Northern Ireland
- Died: 18 December 2015 (aged 93)
- Occupations: Bartender; mixologist
- Known for: Head bartender of the Savoy Hotel American Bar
- Awards: Lifetime Achievement Award – Mixology Bar Awards

Joseph "Joe" Gilmore (19 May 1922 – 18 December 2015) was a Northern Irish bartender and mixologist. He was the head barman at the Savoy Hotel's American Bar from 1954 to 1976 and is recognised as the creator of numerous cocktails to mark special events and important guests, a longstanding tradition at the American Bar. Gilmore's best-known creations include the Moonwalk, the Link-Up, the Savoy Corpse Reviver, the Lorraine, and the Missouri Mule.

== Early life ==
Joseph Patrick Gilmore was born on 19 May 1922 in Belfast, Northern Ireland, to John Gilmore, a tobacconist, and Margaret O'Connor, a tailor. He was the third of nine children.

In 1938, aged 16, Gilmore moved to London to find work and "adventure". He began working as a wallpaper packer at the Arthur Sanderson & Sons factory in Perivale, later taking up work as a kitchen hand.

Gilmore began his early bartender training at La Coquille, a French restaurant on St Martin's Lane, Covent Garden, among other places. While working at the Olde Bell, he served the Welsh millionaire steel baron Kenneth Davies and the aviator Amy Johnson. The couple reportedly asked Gilmore for a dry martini, which he attempted unsuccessfully; Davies and Johnson politely demonstrated how to make one. Gilmore cited this interaction as the spark that fuelled his passion for cocktail mixology.

== Career ==
Gilmore first began working at the Savoy Hotel as a commis waiter at the American Bar. By 1940, aged 18, he was promoted to trainee barman and began his apprenticeship with Harry Craddock, earning £3.10s a week.

In 1954, Gilmore took over as head bartender. Over the following two decades, he created new cocktails, especially to honour special occasions and important guests, including Princess Diana, Prince William, Anne, the Princess Royal, the Queen Mother, Winston Churchill, and the American presidents Harry S. Truman and Richard Nixon.

In addition to serving five generations of royals at private receptions and parties, Gilmore frequently served Errol Flynn, Laurel and Hardy, Charlie Chaplin, Dwight D. Eisenhower, Grace Kelly, George Bernard Shaw, Ernest Hemingway, Noël Coward, Agatha Christie, Alice Faye, Ingrid Bergman, Julie Andrews, Laurence Olivier, Joan Crawford, Judy Garland, Liza Minnelli, Bing Crosby, and Frank Sinatra, among others.

In 1969, he created one of his most famous cocktails, the "Moonwalk", to commemorate the Apollo 11 Moon landing. The cocktail is a combination of grapefruit juice, orange liqueur, and rose water, topped with champagne. This was the first drink astronauts Neil Armstrong and Buzz Aldrin had upon returning to Earth.

Frank Sinatra was a frequent guest to the American Bar whenever he was in London and insisted only Gilmore was to serve him. It is widely believed that the line 'set'em up Joe', from his song "One for My Baby", is a reference to Gilmore.

Gilmore retired from the Savoy in 1976.

== Cocktails created ==
=== The Blenheim ===
The Blenheim
- Type: Cocktail
- Ingredients: 3 parts brandy; 2 parts yellow chartreuse; 1 part Lillet; 1 part Orange juice; 1 part Dubonnet
- Base spirit: Brandy
- Standard drinkware: Cocktail glass
- Served: Straight up: chilled, without ice
- Preparation: Shake ingredients together with ice and strain into a cocktail glass.

Created for Sir Winston Churchill's 90th birthday.

=== Churchill ===
Churchill
- Type: Cocktail
- Ingredients: 3 parts Scotch whisky; 1 part Lime Juice; 1 part Sweet vermouth; 1 part Cointreau
- Base spirit: Scotch whisky
- Standard drinkware: Cocktail glass
- Served: Straight up: chilled, without ice
- Preparation: Shake ingredients together with ice and strain into a cocktail glass.

Created for Sir Winston Churchill on one of his many visits to the Savoy.

=== Common Market ===
Common market
- Type: Cocktail
- Ingredients: 1 part Elixir d'Anu (Belgium); 1 part cherry brandy (Denmark); 1 part Noilly Prat (France); 1 part Schlichte (West Germany); 1 part sloe gin (UK); 1 part Orange curacao (Netherlands); 1 part dry white wine (Luxembourg); 1 part coffee liqueur (Ireland); 1 part Carpano (Italy)
- Standard drinkware: Cocktail glass
- Served: Straight up: chilled, without ice
- Preparation: Shake ingredients together with ice and strain into a cocktail glass.

Created to mark Britain's entry into the European Economic Community in 1973, using drinks from all the member states.

=== The Ed Shelly ===
The Ed Shelly
- Type: Cocktail
- Ingredients: 1 parts Canadian whisky; 1 parts apple schnapps (Pucker)
- Base spirit: Whiskey
- Standard drinkware: Snifter
- Served: Straight up: chilled, without ice
- Preparation: Shake ingredients together; serve straight or with one ice cube

=== Four Score (1955) ===
Four score
- Type: Cocktail
- Ingredients: 3 parts brandy; 2 parts Lillet; 1 part yellow chartreuse
- Base spirit: Brandy
- Standard drinkware: Cocktail glass
- Standard garnish: Lemon
- Served: Straight up: chilled, without ice
- Preparation: Stir together with ice, strain into glass, garnish with a twist of lemon rind

Created for Sir Winston Churchill 80th birthday.

=== Golden Doublet ===
Golden doublet
- Type: Cocktail
- Ingredients: 3 parts orange juice; 1 part lime juice; 1 part Grand Marnier
- Standard drinkware: Cocktail glass
- Served: Straight up: chilled, without ice
- Preparation: Shake ingredients together with ice, strain into champagne cocktail glass, and fill with champagne.

Created in 1973 to commemorate the wedding of Princess Anne to Captain Mark Phillips. Doublet was the name of the princess's horse on which she participated in the European Eventing Championships in 1973.

=== Kensington Court Special ===
Kensington Court special
- Type: Cocktail
- Ingredients: 1 part passionruit juice; 1 part lime juice; 1 part apricot brandy; 3 parts vodka
- Base spirit: Vodka
- Standard drinkware: Cocktail glass
- Served: Straight up: chilled, without ice
- Preparation: Shake ingredients together with ice and strain into a cocktail glass.

Created for Sir David Davies.

=== Link Up ===
Link up
- Type: Cocktail
- Ingredients: 1 part Southern Comfort; 1 part Russian vodka; Teaspoon of fresh lime juice
- Base spirit: Vodka
- Standard drinkware: Cocktail glass
- Served: On the rocks
- Preparation: Shake well, serve on the rocks.

Created in 1975 to mark the American and Russian link-up in space, the Apollo–Soyuz project. The cocktail was sent to the U.S. and U.S.S.R. for the astronauts to enjoy when they returned from their mission.

=== Lorraine ===
Lorraine
- Type: Cocktail
- Ingredients: 2 parts gin; 1 part Lillet; 1 part Grand Marnier
- Base spirit: Gin
- Standard drinkware: Cocktail glass
- Served: On the rocks
- Preparation: Stir with ice, strain into glass, and serve.

Created to mark French President Charles de Gaulle's state visit to Britain after the Second World War.

=== Missouri Mule ===
Missouri mule
- Type: Cocktail
- Ingredients: 2 parts bourbon whiskey; 2 parts applejack; 2 parts lemon juice; 1 part Campari; 1 part Cointreau
- Base spirit: Bourbon whiskey, Campari
- Standard drinkware: Cocktail glass
- Served: Straight up: chilled, without ice
- Preparation: Shake ingredients together with ice and strain into a cocktail glass.

Created for American President Harry S Truman, to commemorate his home state of Missouri and the donkey mascot of the Democratic Party.

=== Moonwalk ===
Moonwalk
- Type: Cocktail
- Ingredients: 1 part fresh grapefruit juice; 1 part Grand Marnier; 2 dashes rose water
- Standard drinkware: Cocktail glass
- Served: Straight up: chilled, without ice
- Preparation: Shake well, strain into wine glass, and top up with champagne.

Created in 1969 to mark the first human Moon landing. The cocktail was the first drink the American astronauts had when they returned to Earth.

=== My Fair Lady ===
My Fair Lady
- Type: Cocktail
- Ingredients: 1 part gin; 1 part lemon juice; 1 part orange juice; 1 part strawberry syrup; 1 dash of egg white
- Base spirit: Gin
- Standard drinkware: Cocktail glass
- Served: Straight up: chilled, without ice
- Preparation: Shake ingredients together with ice and strain into a cocktail glass.

Created to mark Julie Andrews' first night in the musical My Fair Lady.

=== Nixon ===
Nixon
- Type: Cocktail
- Ingredients: 1 part bourbon whiskey; 1 part sloe gin; 2 dashes of peach bitters
- Base spirit: Bourbon whiskey
- Standard drinkware: Cocktail glass
- Standard garnish: a slice of fresh peach and a cherry
- Served: On the rocks
- Preparation: Stir and serve on the rocks, garnish.

Created in 1969 to mark American President Richard Nixon's visit to Britain.

=== Powerscourt ===
Powerscourt
- Type: Cocktail
- Ingredients: 1 parts brandy; 1 parts lime juice; 2 part orange juice; 2 part Creme de Peche Liqueur
- Base spirit: Brandy
- Standard drinkware: Cocktail glass
- Served: Straight up: chilled, without ice
- Preparation: Shake ingredients together with ice and strain into a cocktail glass.

Created for Sarah, Duchess of York

=== Royal Arrival ===
Royal arrival
- Type: Cocktail
- Ingredients: 4 parts gin; 1 parts lemon juice; 1 part Crème de Noyaux; 1 part kümmel; Dash egg white; Dash of vegetable extract
- Base spirit: gin
- Standard drinkware: Cocktail glass
- Served: Straight up: chilled, without ice
- Preparation: Shake ingredients together with ice and strain into a cocktail glass.

Created in 1960 to mark the birth of Prince Andrew.

=== Savoy Affair ===
Savoy affair
- Type: Cocktail
- Ingredients: 1 part lime juice; 1 part Fraise de Bois liqueur; 1 part passionfruit juice; 1 part peach brandy
- Base spirit: Brandy
- Standard drinkware: Cocktail glass
- Standard garnish: a strawberry
- Served: Straight up: chilled, without ice
- Preparation: Shake ingredients together with ice, strain into a cocktail glass, and fill with champagne and garnish.

=== Savoy Corpse Reviver ===
Savoy corpse reviver
- Type: Cocktail
- Ingredients: 1 part brandy; 1 part Fernet-Branca; 1 part White crème de menthe
- Base spirit: Brandy
- Served: Straight up: chilled, without ice
- Preparation: Shake ingredients together with ice and strain into a glass.

=== Savoy Royale ===
Savoy royale
- Type: Cocktail
- Ingredients: 1/2 peach; 2 strawberries; Teaspoon of sugar
- Standard drinkware: Champagne flute
- Served: Straight up: chilled, without ice
- Preparation: Liquidise, strain into a champagne glass, and fill with champagne.

Created for the Queen Mother on one of her private visits to the Savoy.

=== Wolfram ===
Wolfram
- Type: Cocktail
- Ingredients: 2 parts gin; 2 parts Wolfschmidt kümmel; 2 parts dry vermouth; 1 part lemon juice
- Base spirit: gin
- Standard drinkware: Cocktail glass
- Served: Straight up: chilled, without ice
- Preparation: Shake ingredients together with ice and strain into a cocktail glass.

== Personal life ==
Gilmore never returned to Ireland, but "... never forgot his Irish roots or family background and never lost his soft Belfast accent". He remained a Roman Catholic throughout his life, and died on 18 December 2015, aged 93.

== See also ==
- List of cocktails
