= Shaken, not stirred =

James Bond catchphrase

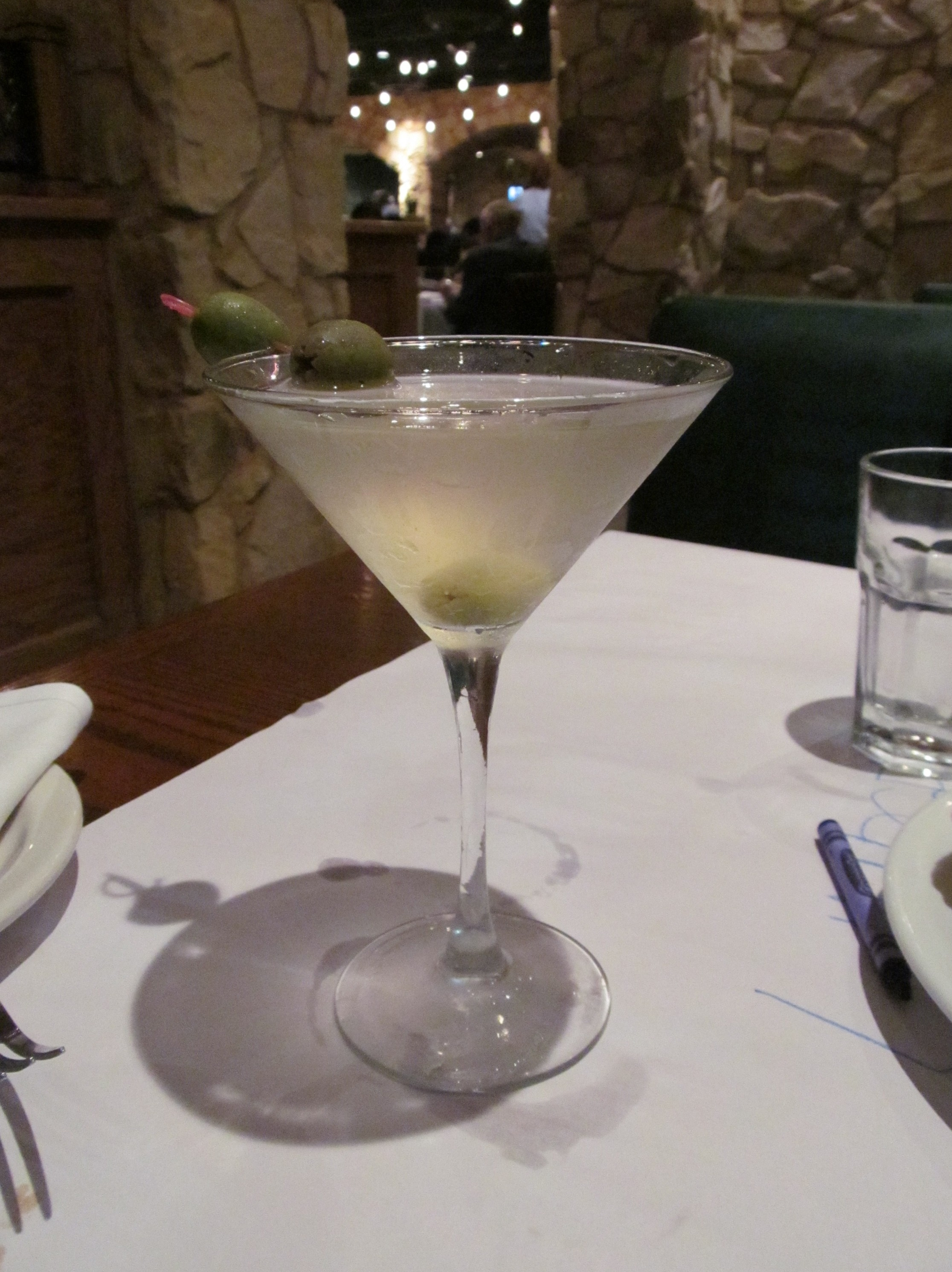
A vodka martini

"Shaken, not stirred" is a James Bond catchphrase. It describes how Ian Fleming's fictional British Secret Service agent James Bond prefers his martini cocktail.

The catchphrase first appears in the novel Diamonds Are Forever (1956), though Bond himself does not actually say it until Dr. No (1958), where his exact words are "shaken and not stirred." In the film adaptations of Fleming's novels, the phrase is first said by the villain, Dr. Julius No (Joseph Wiseman), when he offers the drink in Dr. No (1962). It is not uttered by Bond himself (played by Sean Connery) until Goldfinger (1964). It is used in numerous Bond films thereafter with the notable exceptions of You Only Live Twice (1967), in which the drink is wrongly offered as "stirred, not shaken", to Bond's response "Perfect", and Casino Royale (2006) in which Bond (Daniel Craig), after losing millions of dollars in a game of poker, is asked if he wants his martini shaken or stirred and snaps, "Do I look like I give a damn?"

== Variations in the Bond novels and films ==
=== Novels ===
The earliest form of the "shaken, not stirred" motif appears in the first Bond novel, Casino Royale (1953), where it only specifies "shake it". After meeting his CIA contact Felix Leiter for the first time, James Bond orders a drink from a bartender while at the casino.

'A dry martini,' he said. 'One. In a deep champagne goblet.'
'Oui, monsieur.'
'Just a moment. Three measures of Gordon's, one of vodka, half a measure of Kina Lillet. Shake it very well until it's ice-cold, then add a large thin slice of lemon peel. Got it?'
'Certainly monsieur.' The barman seemed pleased with the idea.
'Gosh, that's certainly a drink,' said Leiter.
Bond laughed. 'When I'm ... er ... concentrating,' he explained, 'I never have more than one drink before dinner. But I do like that one to be large and very strong and very cold, and very well made. I hate small portions of anything, particularly when they taste bad. This drink's my own invention. I'm going to patent it when I think of a good name.'

— Casino Royale, Chapter 7: Rouge et Noir

The drink will later be referred to as a "Vesper", after the original Bond girl, Vesper Lynd. A Vesper differs from Bond's usual cocktail of choice, the martini, in that it uses both gin and vodka, Kina Lillet instead of vermouth, and lemon peel instead of an olive. In the same scene, Bond gives more details about the "Vesper", telling the same bartender that vodka made from grain rather than potatoes makes the drink even better. Kina Lillet is no longer available. Russian and Polish vodkas were also always preferred by Bond if they were in stock. Although there is a lot of discussion on the Vesper, it is ordered only once throughout Ian Fleming's novels, and by later books Bond is ordering regular vodka martinis. However, he also drinks regular gin martinis. In total, Bond orders 19 vodka martinis and 16 gin martinis throughout Fleming's novels and short stories.

The first appearance of a contrast between shaken and stirred is in the novel Diamonds Are Forever (1956); note the presence of "and", which was later dropped in the films:

The waiter brought the Martinis, shaken and not stirred, as Bond had stipulated, and some slivers of lemon peel in a shot glass.

— Diamonds Are Forever, p. 53

First said by Bond in the novel Dr. No (1958):

And I would like a medium Vodka dry Martini — with a slice of lemon peel. Shaken and not stirred, please. I would prefer Russian or Polish vodka.

— Dr. No, Chapter 15: Pandora's Box

=== Film ===
The American Film Institute honoured Goldfinger and the phrase on 21 July 2005 by ranking it #90 on a list of best movie quotes in the past 100 years of film.

==== Sean Connery ====
"A martini. Shaken, not stirred."
- Character: James Bond
- Actor: Sean Connery
- First used in: Goldfinger
- Voted #90 in AFI's 100 Movie Quotes poll

The shaken martini is mentioned twice in the Bond film Dr. No (1962). When Bond (Sean Connery) has presumably ordered a drink from room service, it is mixed by a waiter (Frank Singuineau), who says, "One medium dry vodka martini mixed like you said, sir, not stirred." (A slice of lime was in the bottom of the glass.) Later, Dr. Julius No (Joseph Wiseman) presents Bond with a drink—"A medium dry martini, lemon peel. Shaken, not stirred."

Bond did not vocally order one himself until Goldfinger (1964), as: "A martini. Shaken, not stirred."

In the 1967 film You Only Live Twice, Bond's contact, Dikko Henderson (Charles Gray), prepares a martini for Bond and says, "That's, um, stirred, not shaken. That was right, wasn't it?" to which Bond replies politely, "Perfect."

==== George Lazenby ====
In George Lazenby's only film as Bond, On Her Majesty's Secret Service, Bond never actually orders himself a drink. Still, when he meets Marc-Ange Draco (Gabriele Ferzetti) for the first time, Draco tells his assistant, Olympe (Virginia North), to get a dry martini for Bond. Draco then adds, "Shaken, not stirred."

==== Roger Moore ====
Roger Moore's Bond never actually ordered one himself, but has one ordered for him several times, nonetheless. In the 1977 film The Spy Who Loved Me, Anya Amasova (Barbara Bach) orders him one. In Moonraker, his drink is prepared by Manuela (Emily Bolton). In Octopussy, the title character (Maud Adams) herself greets Bond by mixing his drink.

==== Timothy Dalton ====
Timothy Dalton's Bond ordered his trademark martini in both of his films. In The Living Daylights, he and Kara Milovy (Maryam d'Abo) arrive in Austria, where he orders a martini "shaken, not stirred" shortly after entering their hotel. For his second film, Licence to Kill he does not directly order it. Instead, he tells Pam Bouvier (Carey Lowell) what drink he would like as he plays blackjack, only to end up disappearing shortly after, leaving Bouvier to down the entire martini in one long gulp—much to her disgust.

==== Pierce Brosnan ====
In GoldenEye, Bond (Pierce Brosnan) orders the drink in a casino while talking with Xenia Onatopp (Famke Janssen). Later, Valentin Zukovsky (Robbie Coltrane) refers to Bond as a "charming, sophisticated secret agent. Shaken, but not stirred." In Tomorrow Never Dies, Paris Carver (Teri Hatcher) orders the drink for Bond after the two meet again after years apart. While Paris's choice of drink had changed, Bond's had not. In The World Is Not Enough, Bond orders the drink in Zukovsky's casino. In Die Another Day, Bond is coming back on a rather turbulent British Airways flight. The air hostess (played by Roger Moore's daughter Deborah Moore) serves him his martini, to which Bond replies, "Luckily I asked for it shaken". Later in the film, when Bond travels to Gustav Graves's (Toby Stephens) ice palace in Iceland, he orders another martini, ironically telling the bartender "Plenty of ice, if you can spare it."

==== Daniel Craig ====
The Vesper was reused in the 2006 film version of Casino Royale, while Bond (Daniel Craig) is playing poker to defeat Le Chiffre (Mads Mikkelsen). Bond ordered the drink, providing detailed instructions for its preparation. The other poker players order the Vesper as well, with Felix Leiter (Jeffrey Wright) telling the bartender (Martin Ucík) to "keep the fruit" with his. Later, after Bond loses money to Le Chiffre, he orders another martini, but when the bartender (Dusan Pelech) asks whether he would like it shaken or stirred, Bond snaps, "Do I look like I give a damn?"

In Quantum of Solace, the bartender on an aeroplane (Jake Seal) gives the precise recipe for the Vesper from Fleming's novel Casino Royale, which was a minor anachronism, since Kina Lillet was reformulated (removing the Kina) in 1986, 22 years before the film's production. Bond is purported to have drunk six of them.

In Skyfall, when talking to Bond girl Sévérine (Bérénice Marlohe) at a casino bar, the bartender (Orion Lee) is seen shaking Bond's martini before pouring it, to which Bond comments "perfect".

In Spectre, Bond orders his signature drink in a mountaintop resort, only to be told by the bartender (Victor Schefé) to his disdain that he is at a health clinic and that the bar does not serve alcohol. Q (Ben Whishaw) instead orders Bond an unpleasant-looking green-coloured "prolytic digestive enzyme shake", and a disgusted Bond asks the bartender, "Do me a favour, will you? Throw that down the toilet. Cut out the middleman."

In No Time to Die, Bond orders his signature drink, a vodka martini, and drinks it with Paloma (Ana de Armas) in honor of Felix Leiter. Paloma finishes the drink very quickly to calm her nervousness.

== Purpose of shaking ==
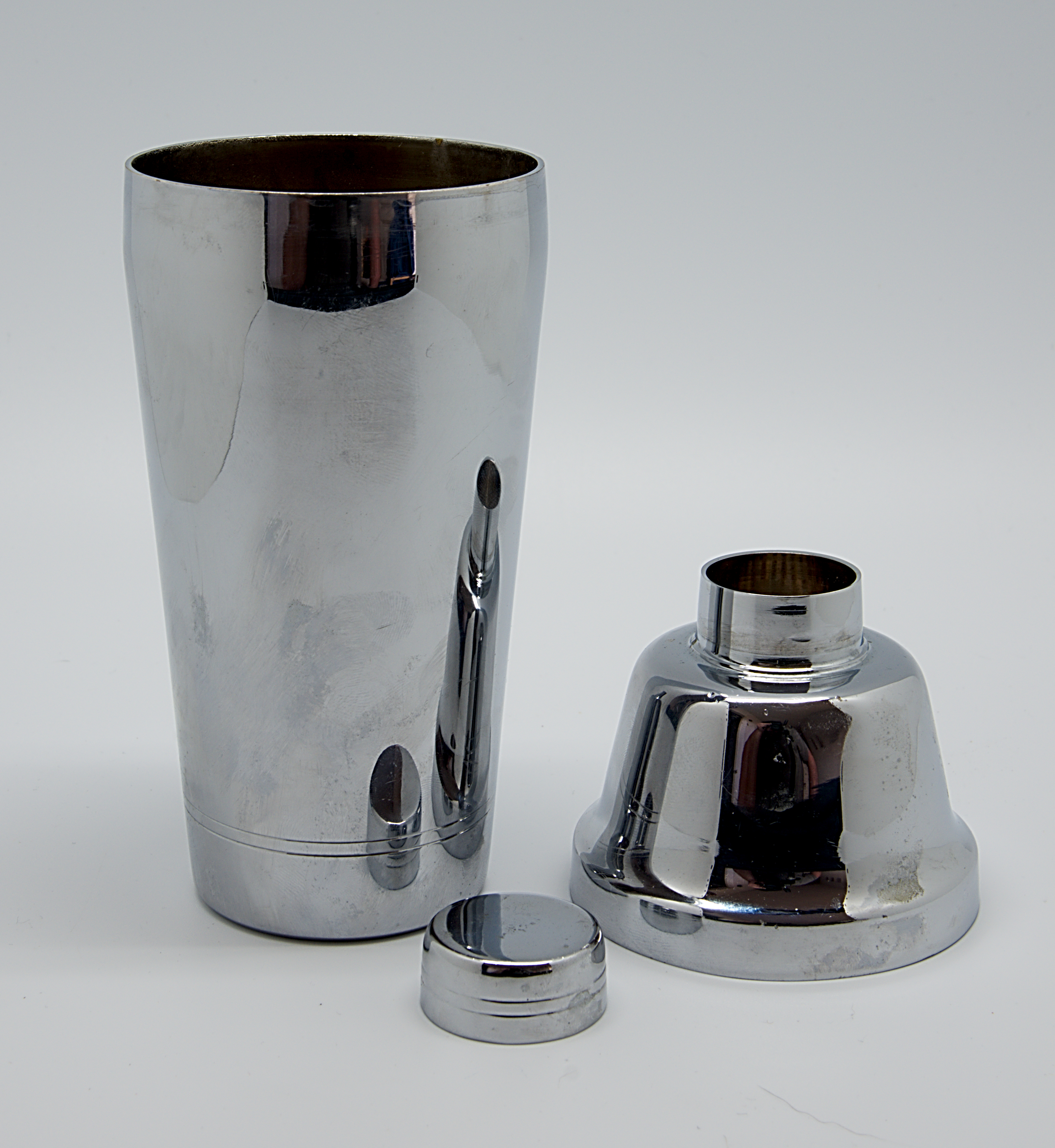
Cocktail shaker

Biochemists and martini connoisseurs have investigated the difference between a martini shaken and a martini stirred. The Department of Biochemistry at the University of Western Ontario in Canada studied whether preparation of a martini affects its antioxidant capacity; the study found that the shaken gin martinis were able to deactivate hydrogen peroxide and leave only 0.072% of the peroxide control value, while the stirred gin martini left 0.157%.

Andrew Lycett, an Ian Fleming biographer, believed that Fleming liked his martinis shaken, not stirred, because Fleming thought that stirring a drink diminished its flavour. Lycett also noted that Fleming preferred gin and vermouth for his martini. Fleming was a fan of martinis shaken by Hans Schröder, a German bartender.

Harry Craddock's Savoy Cocktail Book (1930) prescribes shaking for all its martini recipes. However, many bartenders stir any cocktail whose ingredients are all transparent—such as martinis, manhattans, and negronis—to maintain clarity and texture. Shaking a drink introduces air bubbles into the mixture and can chip off small pieces of ice when ice cubes hit each other or the shaker walls. Both factors lead to a cloudy appearance and a texture different from that of a stirred drink. However, when any ingredients are opaque (such as citrus juices, dairy, or eggs), changes in clarity and texture are less critical.

Both shaking and stirring a drink with ice serve to chill and dilute the drink. Both techniques are equally effective, but shaking is much faster. Bartenders do not stir long enough to reach the matching temperature and dilution.

Some connoisseurs believe that shaking gin "bruises" the gin (gives it a slight bitter taste). Fleming's novel Casino Royale states that Bond "watched as the deep glass became frosted with the pale golden drink, slightly aerated by the bruising of the shaker," suggesting that Bond was requesting it shaken because of the vodka it contained. Before the 1960s, vodka was, for the most part, refined from potatoes (usually cheaper brands). This element made the vodka oily. To disperse the oil, Bond ordered his martini shaken; thus, in the same scene where he orders the martini, he tells the bartender that vodka made from grain rather than potatoes makes his drink even better. Shaking is also said to dissolve the vermouth more effectively, making it less oily-tasting.

Properly called a Bradford, a shaken martini also appears cloudier than when stirred. This is caused by small ice fragments present in a shaken martini. This also raises questions about the movie versions, which are never cloudy. Diluting the drink may be deliberate.

In "Stirred", an episode of The West Wing, President Josiah Bartlet (Martin Sheen) disagrees with Bond in a conversation with his aide Charlie Young: "Shaken, not stirred, will get you cold water with a dash of gin and dry vermouth. The reason you stir it with a special spoon is to prevent the ice from chipping. James is ordering a weak martini and being snooty about it."

== Other 007 drinking habits ==
A general study of Bond's consumption of alcohol in the series of novels by Fleming was published by three scientists in 2013.

=== Spirits ===
Bond's drinking habits mirror those of his creator, Ian Fleming. Fleming, as well as Bond throughout the novels, preferred bourbon whiskey. Fleming himself had a fondness for gin, drinking as much as a bottle a day; however, he was converted to bourbon at the behest of his doctor, who informed him of his failing health.

Otherwise, in the films, James Bond normally has a fondness for vodka, which is accompanied by product placement for a brand. For instance, Smirnoff was clearly shown in 1962's Dr. No and in 1997's Tomorrow Never Dies, in which Bond sits drinking a bottle while in his hotel room in Hamburg. Other brands featured in the films have included Absolut Vodka, Stolichnaya and Finlandia. In the film GoldenEye, Bond suggests cognac when offered a drink by M (Judi Dench), who gives him bourbon instead, as it is her preference. The whiskey poured is in fact Jack Daniel's, which markets itself as a Tennessee Whiskey, which is legally a sub-category of bourbon—often distinguished from bourbon itself.

In Goldfinger, Bond drinks a mint julep at Auric Goldfinger (Gert Fröbe)'s Kentucky stud farm, and in Thunderball, Emilio Largo (Adolfo Celi) gives Bond a Rum Collins. In Die Another Day, Bond drinks a mojito. In Casino Royale, Bond orders Mount Gay Rum with soda. In that film, he also invents the famous "Vesper" cocktail—a variation on a martini—originally included in the novel but not seen in the films until the reboot. In Skyfall, the villain Raoul Silva (Javier Bardem) says he believes 50-year-old Macallan single malt whisky to be one of Bond's favourites.

Also in Goldfinger during a briefing on Auric Goldfinger, their host Colonel Smithers (Richard Vernon) offers a refill with, "Have a little more of this rather disappointing brandy." M (Bernard Lee) replies, "Why, what is the matter with it?" Bond replies, "I'd say it was a 30-year-old Fine [as in Fine brandy] indifferently blended, Sir... with an overdose of Bon Bois." Bon Bois is a Cognac region known for its poor soils. It is a low-quality cognac, and Bond says too much of it was used in the blend.

In the novel Moonraker, it is noted in the card club Blades, Bond adds a single pinch of black pepper to his glass of fine Wolfschmidt vodka, much to M's consternation, to which Bond says he got into the habit in joints that served villainous home brew. It sinks all the poisons to the bottom, and Bond got to like the taste. However, he admits he should not have insulted the Club Wolfschmidt.

=== Beer ===
Bond is also seen in Quantum of Solace drinking bottled beer when meeting with Felix Leiter in a Bolivian bar. The following Bond movies from Craig's tenure show that Bond's preferred beer is Heineken. In Licence to Kill, when he is at the dive bar Barrelhead Bar, he orders the same as his contact, Pam Bouvier: a "Bud with a lime."

=== Wines ===
In the book Casino Royale, Bond describes Taittinger champagne as "not a well-known brand, but it is probably the finest champagne in the world."

In several of the Bond films, he is known to prefer Bollinger and Dom Pérignon champagne. Never primarily a red wine drinker, Bond tended to favour Château Mouton Rothschild; a 1947 vintage in Goldfinger, and half a bottle On Her Majesty's Secret Service, a 1934 ordered by M in Moonraker, and a '55 in Diamonds Are Forever—where Bond unveiled the assassin Wint (Bruce Glover) posing as a waiter because the latter did not know that Mouton-Rothschild is a claret. In the Jeffery Deaver novel Carte Blanche, Bond expresses a knowledge and appreciation of South African wine.

In the film of Diamonds Are Forever, Bond savours a glass of sherry and fools M into thinking Bond has made a mistake when he pronounces a year of make ("'51"). When Bond is informed that sherry has no vintage, he replies (to a non-plussed M) that he was discerning the vintage of the wine on which the sherry is based—1851.

=== Others ===
In the film You Only Live Twice, Bond opts for sake over his usual martini, indicating that he especially likes it when it is served at what he says is the correct temperature of 98.4 °F (36.9 °C). Tiger Tanaka (Tetsurō Tamba), his host, is impressed and tells Bond he is exceptionally cultured—for a European.

Aside from alcoholic beverages, Bond is a coffee drinker and eschews tea with a passion, believing it to have been a factor in the fall of the British Empire and referring to it as "a cup of mud" (in Fleming's Goldfinger). In the novel Live and Let Die, he expresses his fondness for Jamaican Blue Mountain Coffee—while in the film adaptation he is shown operating (in some sense) a La Pavoni Europiccola lever coffee machine in the kitchen of his flat. In the Fleming novel From Russia, with Love he is shown to own a Chemex Coffeemaker and prefers his coffee brewed that way, while in the film version he orders coffee "very black" for breakfast from his hotel's room service; in Kerim Bey (Pedro Armendáriz)'s office he asks for his Turkish coffee "medium sweet" as it is customary to specify the level of sweetness when ordering. He also accepts a cup, refusing cream or sugar, from Franz Sanchez (Robert Davi) in Licence to Kill—whereas in Moonraker he refuses a cup of tea offered by Hugo Drax (Michael Lonsdale). In The Living Daylights, Bond tastes a cup of café coffee he is served in the Prater Amusement Park, Vienna, making a face when it is not up to his standards.

== See also ==
- Outline of James Bond
- Drinking culture
