= Old Etonians (disambiguation) =

Old Etonians are past students of Eton College.

Old Etonians may also refer to:

- Old Etonian (cocktail), a mixed drink
- Old Etonians F.C., an English football club whose players are taken from previous attendees of Eton College
