= Claret cup (drink) =

Red wine cocktail popular 19th century

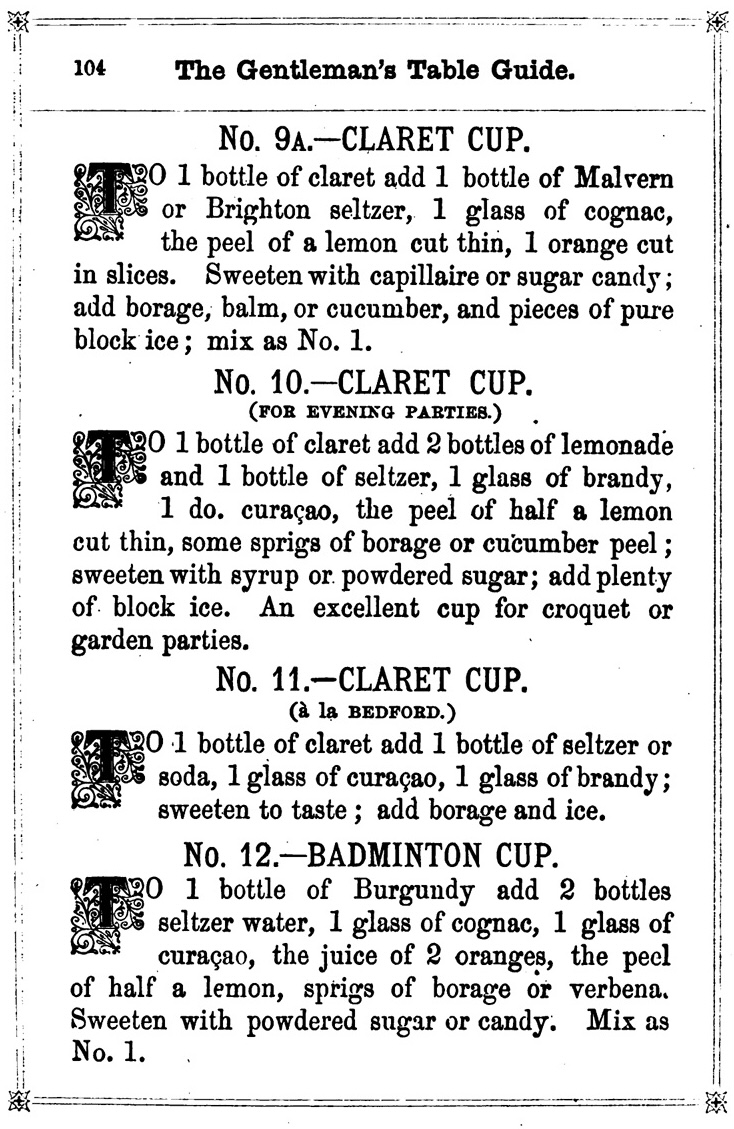
Claret-cup recipes from The Gentleman's Table Guide (1873)

Claret cup is a type of wine cocktail that was popular in 19th-century western Europe and North America. The basic ingredients of claret cup are chilled claret or similar wine, carbonated water, sugar, and flavorings that supply a citrusy or herbal aroma.

One 1877 recipe called for dissolved cane sugar, a bottle of claret, two thin lemon slices, one cucumber peel, a glass of sherry, a spoonful of brandy, a spoonful of noyeau or maraschino, and grated nutmeg. Then blend, wait, taste test, and add ice and a bottle of carbonated water. The lighter recipe subtracted the sherry and brandy, doubled the soda water, and added a few drops of almond extract. A strong cup was suitable for drinking with dinner, a lighter one might consumed after sport, such as badminton or cricket. An 1895 recipe from America added a little curaçao liqueur and garnished with mint sprigs; the same cookbook suggested that someone wanting to make a "claret cup (English style)" build on the American recipe but add "a few strawberries" and borage. An 1879 recipe for superior claret cup suggested a ratio of two bottles of claret to one bottle of champagne, plus three glasses of sherry, one glass of noyau, half a pound crushed ice, with a borage or cucumber-curl garnish.

Other recipes used grated cinnamon, allspice, cloves and cardamom instead of nutmeg; some added orange slices or even pineapple chunks. Riffs on the basic recipe added a broad range of other flavors including Kirschwasser, rhubarb wine, violet syrup, or ginger beer (one at a time, not all together). Common garnishes and herbal flavorings included the edible borage flower, lemon verbena, citronella oil, and sprigs of mint or lemon balm.

Variations on the theme included the champagne cup, hock cup, Chablis cup, burgundy cup, cider cup, and Moselle cup, each with adjustments to the amount of sugar. There was also a variation called Claret Cup à la Henry VIII (although it is unclear how Henry VIII is involved in the matter):

CLARET CUP À LA HENRY VIII Peel off the rind of a lemon and mix both the juice and rind with powdered sugar. Pour over them a glass of Sherry and a bottle of Claret and sweeten to taste. Add a sprig of verbena and a bottle of soda water with a little grated nutmeg. Strain the mixture and serve with ice.

The various "wine cups," as they were called, are best when "fresh and sparkling" and thus it was recommended that they be prepared immediately before the opening of a party. An 1894 British etiquette guide firmly advised readers on the correct service of claret-cup: "Champagne-cup and claret-cup are, in the country, served on a separate table, or in an adjoining room. Small tumblers and champagne-glasses should be placed upon the same table...in town, where space is made the most of, these drinks are usually placed on the sideboard. A manservant should be at hand to pour out the cup as required." Claret cup can be served out of jugs, glass pitchers, or a punch bowl. One guide to fancy beverages recommends preparing and consuming claret cup in the summer months, "regulating the proportion of ice to the weather."

In wintertime, mulled claret cups would be served from pots of claret, heated low and slow with sugar and a cinnamon stick, and served warm.

The refreshment of claret cup gets a nod in Edward Lear's volume of light verse More Nonsense. Soda water, sugar, ice and "burrage" for preparing a claret cup are referenced in the lyrics of Thespis (1871), the first comic-opera collaboration of Gilbert & Sullivan. Claret cup is served, to the general satisfaction of the characters, in George Bernard Shaw's You Never Can Tell (1897).

Clericó, a popular beverage in South America with a similar formula, is a direct borrowing into Spanish from the English-language claret cup.

== See also ==
- Sherry cobbler
- Sangria
