= Pink Squirrel =

Cocktail native to Milwaukee

The Pink Squirrel is a sweet, alcoholic cocktail thought to have been invented at Bryant's Cocktail Lounge in Milwaukee, Wisconsin during the supper club era of the 1940s. The cocktail contains approximately equal proportions of crème de Noyaux, white crème de cacao, and heavy cream, and is shaken with ice and strained into cocktail glasses to serve.

Because it is thought to have been originally created using ice cream, it is viewed as a relative of the Grasshopper and Brandy Alexander as cream-based cocktails comparable to milkshakes.
