= Quinquina =

Variety of apéritif wines

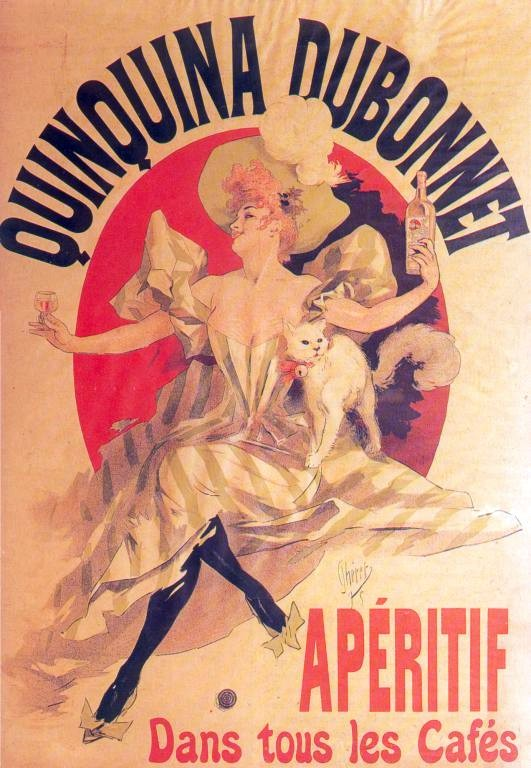
Dubonnet, a French aperitif

Quinquina is an aromatised wine, a variety of apéritif. Traditionally quinquinas contain cinchona, which provides quinine, introduced to Europe from Peru in the 17th century by Spanish missionaries, and used both in treating malaria and as the principal ingredient in tonic water.

Some quinquinas are:

- Bonal Gentiane Quina
- Byrrh
- Cocchi Americano
- Contratto Americano Rosso
- Dubonnet
- Lillet Blanc
- Mattei Cap Corse Quinquina Blanc and Rouge
- MAiDENii
- St. Raphaël
- Alma de Trabanco- Quinquina en Rama
