= Corpse reviver =

Family of cocktails intended for curing hangovers

The corpse reviver family of named cocktails are sometimes drunk as alcoholic hangover tongue-in-cheek "cures", of potency or characteristics to be able to revive even a dead person. Some corpse reviver cocktail recipes have been lost to time, but several variations commonly thought to be tied to the American Bar at the Savoy Hotel remain, especially those espoused by Harry Craddock that originally date back to at least 1930 and are still being made. Many "reviver" variations exist and the word is sometimes used as a generic moniker for any morning-after cocktail, also known as a "hair of the dog".

== History ==
The use of the words "corpse reviver" to describe a mixed drink appears in literature as early as an issue of Punch in 1861. A recipe appeared in the Gentleman's Table Guide in 1871 that called for 1/2 a wine glass of brandy, 1/2 a wine glass of Maraschino, and two dashes of Boker's Bitters. A recipe for a cocktail called the Criterion Reviver appeared in 1875 in Leo Engel's American and Other Drinks bar guide. Another recipe from 1903 for a Corpse Reviver made it as a fancy pousse-café.

== Corpse reviver #1 ==
Corpse reviver #1
- Type: Cocktail
- Ingredients: 2 parts cognac; 1 part apple brandy or Calvados; 1 part sweet vermouth
- Standard drinkware: Cocktail glass
- Served: Straight up: chilled, without ice
- Preparation: Shake well and strain into cocktail glass.

The first widely popularized corpse reviver cocktail is listed in The Savoy Cocktail Book and is a cognac-based cocktail that calls for two parts cognac, one part Calvados or apple brandy, and one part Italian vermouth. In bartender Craddock's notes he says "To be taken before 11AM, or whenever steam or energy is needed".

Bartender Victor Bergeron (AKA Trader Vic) lists the corpse reviver #1 with the same ingredients and calls for twisting a lemon peel over the drink.

Duffy, Patrick Gavin (1956). The Official Mixer's Manual For Home and Professional Use. "Revised and Enlarged By James A. Beard" lists the same ingredients.

== Corpse reviver #2 and #2A ==
Corpse reviver #2
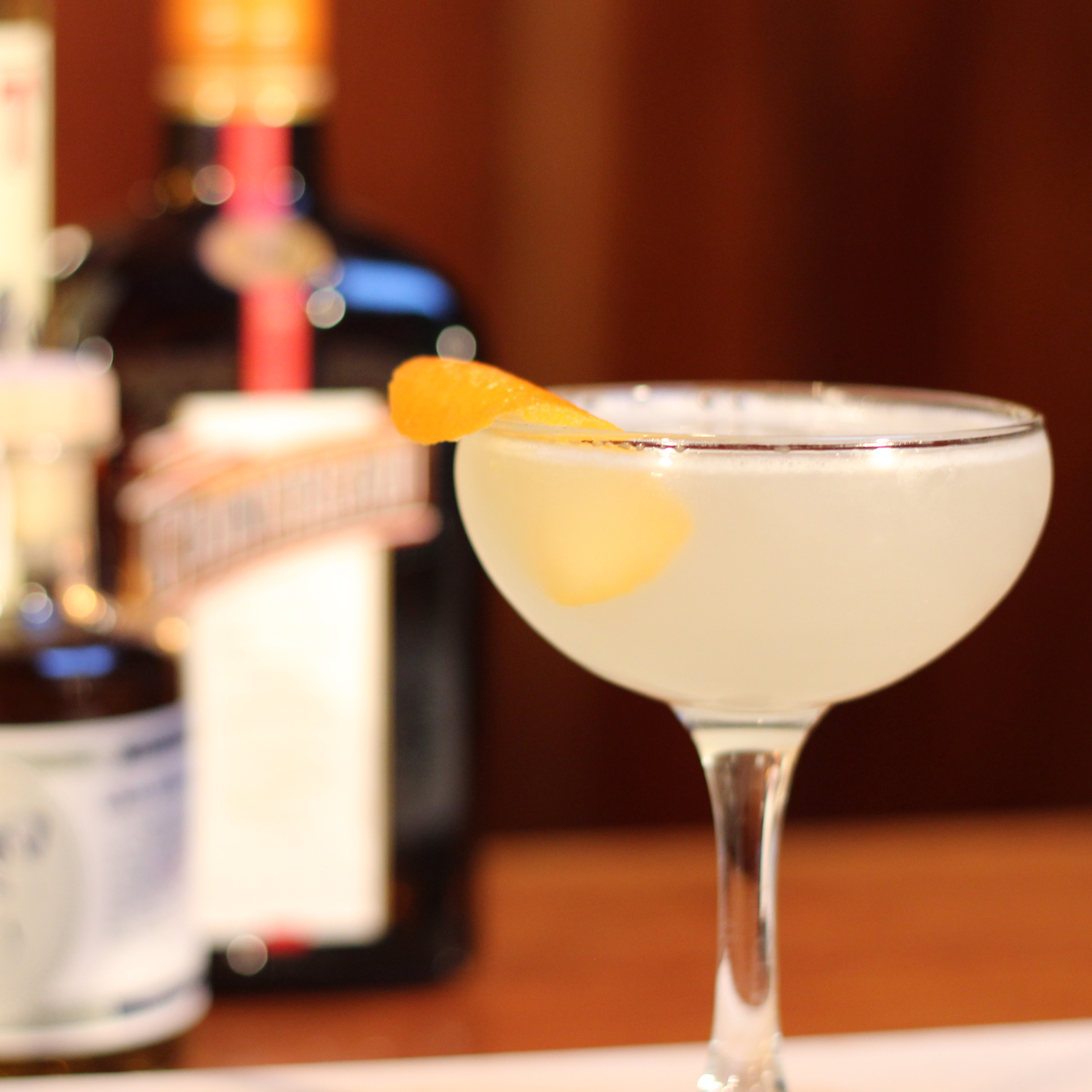
- A corpse reviver #2
- Type: Cocktail
- Ingredients: 30 ml gin; 30 ml lemon juice; 30 ml Cointreau; 30 ml Lillet Blanc; 1 dash absinthe
- Standard drinkware: Cocktail glass
- Served: Straight up: chilled, without ice
- Preparation: Shake ingredients together in a mixer with ice. Strain into chilled glass. Garnish with orange zest.

The corpse reviver #2 as described in the Savoy Cocktail Book is the most commonly drunk of the corpse revivers, and consists of equal parts gin, lemon juice, curaçao (commonly Cointreau), Kina Lillet (now usually replaced with Cocchi Americano, as a closer match to Kina Lillet than modern Lillet Blanc), and a dash of absinthe. The dash of absinthe can either be added to the mix before shaking, or added to the cocktail glass and moved around until the glass has been coated with a layer of absinthe to give a subtle absinthe aroma and flavor to the drink.

The Savoy №2 recipe noted that "Four of these taken in swift succession will unrevive the corpse again."

Both the original and the revised Trader Vic's Bartenders Guide list the corpse reviver #2 the same as the Savoy, but substitutes Swedish Punsch for the Kina Lillet. In his notes he indicates that Kina Lillet may be substituted for the Swedish punsch, so he was likely aware of the Savoy version in both of his editions. In Patrick Duffy's 1956 Official Mixers Manual he lists the corpse reviver #2 as employing punsch and does not mention Lillet. The use of punsch can also be found in Crosby Gaige's Cocktail Guide and Ladies Companion.

In the 21st century punsch is less likely to be stocked in most bars, and so a corpse reviver #2 made with punsch is sometimes differentiated by referencing it as a corpse reviver #2A, even though it will remain listed in some historical cocktail books as only the №2 or as a №2 with annotations.

A corpse reviver with punsch is also sometimes referenced as a corpse reviver #3, but other guides use the №3 to instead mean a later Savoy version that uses Fernet-Branca. When differentiated, the №2A nomenclature is more frequently used.

== Savoy corpse reviver (Fernet) ==
Savoy corpse reviver
- Type: Cocktail
- Ingredients: 1 part brandy; 1 part Fernet Branca; 1 part white crème de menthe
- Standard drinkware: Cocktail glass
- Served: Straight up: chilled, without ice
- Preparation: Shake ingredients together with ice, and strain into a glass.

This recipe was a new variation at the Savoy's American Bar that employed Fernet-Branca as an ingredient, coming almost two decades after the corpse reviver appeared in the Savoy Cocktail Book with its #1 and #2 variations. Salvatore Calabrese states in his book Classic Cocktails that it was created by Johnny Johnson of the Savoy circa 1948, and lists it as a corpse reviver #3. Others believe it was invented later in 1954 by Joe Gilmore, also of the Savoy.

Besides Calabrese, the Fernet version is sometimes categorized by others as the corpse reviver #3, but it is not standardized and it is sometimes referenced as the №4.

== Criterion reviver ==
Leo Engel's 1875 reviver cocktail, the criterion reviver, used an early version of bottled mineral water and carbonic acid to make a medicinal "encore" cocktail that included the directions to "drink while effervescing". Engel served the reviver cocktail while a bartender at the Criterion Hotel's American Bar, which some view as the first American-style cocktail bar in London. The drink called for:

- a bottle of Taunus water (naturally sparkling mineral water from the Grosskarben springs near Frankfurt)
- glass and a half of Encore Whiskey (defunct brand)
- dash of brandy bitters

== Cafe Royal revivers ==
The 1937 Cafe Royal Cocktail Book, by W.J. Tarling, listed four different reviver cocktails. These included a corpse reviver that called for a glass filled with brandy, orange juice, and lemon juice, topped off with champagne, as well as recipes for a new corpse reviver, a stomach reviver, and Godfrey's corpse reviver (attributed to Godfrey Baldini). The index indicated that the book did not have enough space for two other reviver cocktails to be fully listed, including one called a Corpse Reviver Liqueur.

== In popular culture ==
- In "The Handoff", the second episode of the seventh season of Archer, Veronica Deane orders a corpse reviver #2, but only if real absinthe is available.
- In Patrick deWitt's novel French Exit, the main characters each drink a corpse reviver #2 prior to performing a séance.
- In Damien Chazelle's 2022 film Babylon, Jack Conrad orders a corpse reviver then proceeds to give instructions on how to make one.
- In Casey McQuiston's 2024 novel The Pairing, it is stated that a Necromancer is like a Corpse Reviver, just with more absinthe.
