= Podensac =

- Commune
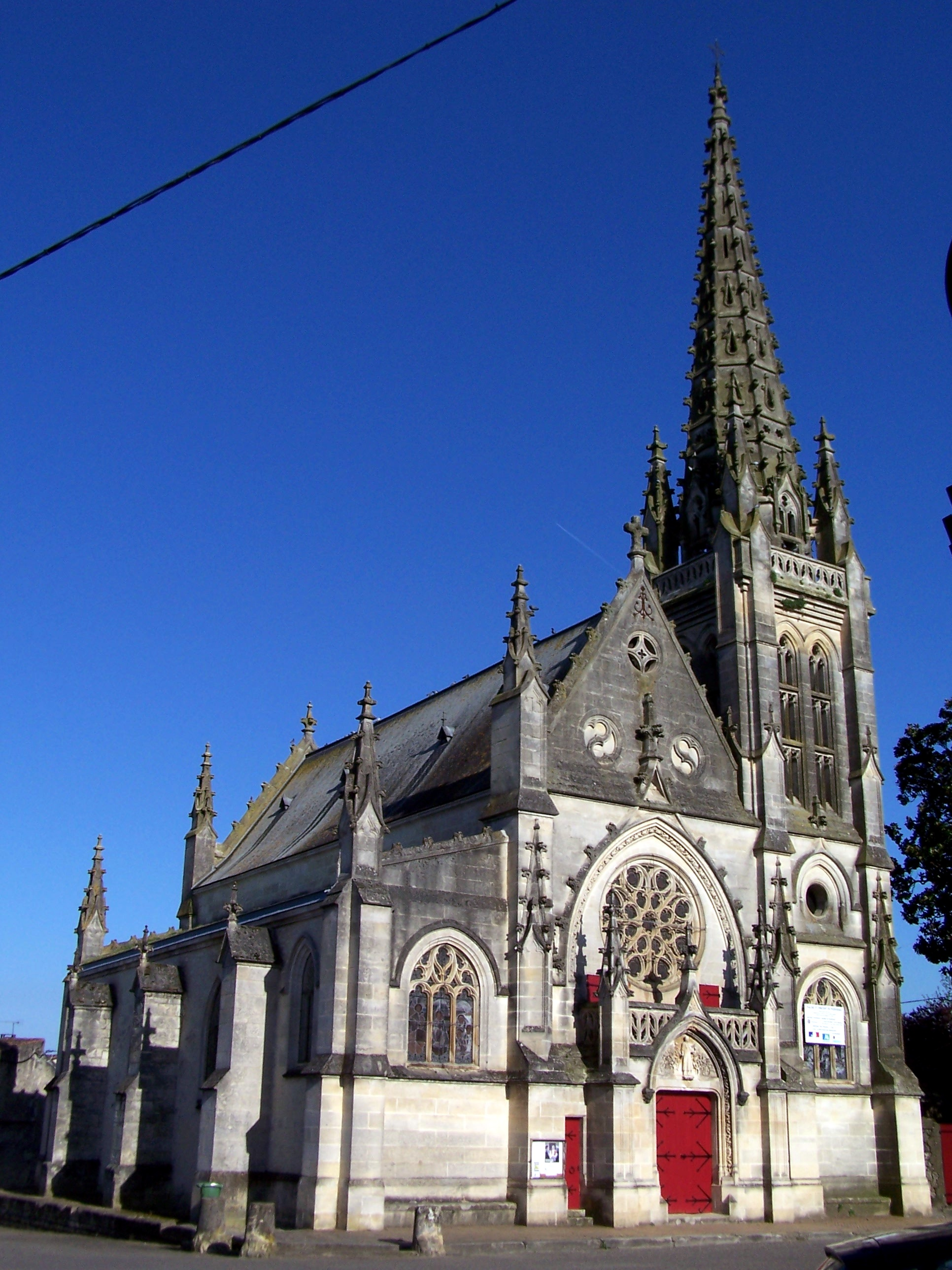
- The church in Podensac

- Coat of arms
- Location of Podensac
- Location within France Location within Nouvelle-Aquitaine
- Coordinates: 44°39′07″N 0°21′15″W
- Country: France
- Region: Nouvelle-Aquitaine
- Department: Gironde
- Arrondissement: Langon
- Canton: Les Landes des Graves

Government
  - Mayor (2020–2026): Bernard Mateille
- Area^{1}: 8.34 km^{2} (3.22 sq mi)
- Highest elevation: 25 m (82 ft)
- Lowest elevation: 2 m (6.6 ft)
- Population (2023): 3,269
  - Density: 392/km^{2} (1,020/sq mi)
- Time zone: UTC+01:00 (CET)
  - Summer (DST): UTC+02:00 (CEST)
- INSEE/Postal code: 33327 /33720
- ^{1} French Land Register data, which excludes lakes, ponds, glaciers > 1 km^{2} (0.386 sq mi or 247 acres) and river estuaries.

Podensac (French pronunciation: [pɔdɛ̃sak]; Gascon: Podençac) is a commune in the Gironde department. It is located in the famous Bordeaux wine region in Nouvelle-Aquitaine (southwestern France).

== Geography ==
Podensac is located within the Graves vineyards, on the left bank of the Garonne river, 30 km (19 mi) southeast from Bordeaux and 15 km (9 mi) northwest from Langon. Podensac station has rail connections to Langon and Bordeaux.

== Population ==
Historical population
Year	Pop.	±% p.a.
1968	1,823	—
1975	1,925	+0.78%
1982	2,219	+2.05%
1990	2,261	+0.23%
1999	2,267	+0.03%
2007	2,600	+1.73%
2012	2,865	+1.96%
2017	3,215	+2.33%
2023	3,269	+0.28%
Source: INSEE

== Twin towns ==
- Morengo (Lombardy, Italy; since 2018)

== Economy ==
- Lillet company (apéritif made of wine and orange liquor). Lillet is famous for being the drink of James Bond in Casino Royale and Quantum of Solace films.
- Maison Des Vins de Graves: a winehouse dedicated to the Graves wines.

== Main sights ==
- Château d´eau Le Corbusier, a Swiss-French architect (pioneers of what is now called modern architecture) (http://www.fondationlecorbusier.asso.fr/podensac.htm)
- Château Chavat: a 1917 castle classified in 2006 as a Monument historique (National Heritage Site of France). It is surrounded by a garden labelled as Remarkable Gardens of France.
- Eglise Saint-Vincent: a church classified in 1925 as a Monument historique.
- Mascaret (tidal bore): the mascaret is a phenomenon in which the leading edge of the incoming tide forms a wave of water in the Gironde estuary that then travels up the Garonne river.
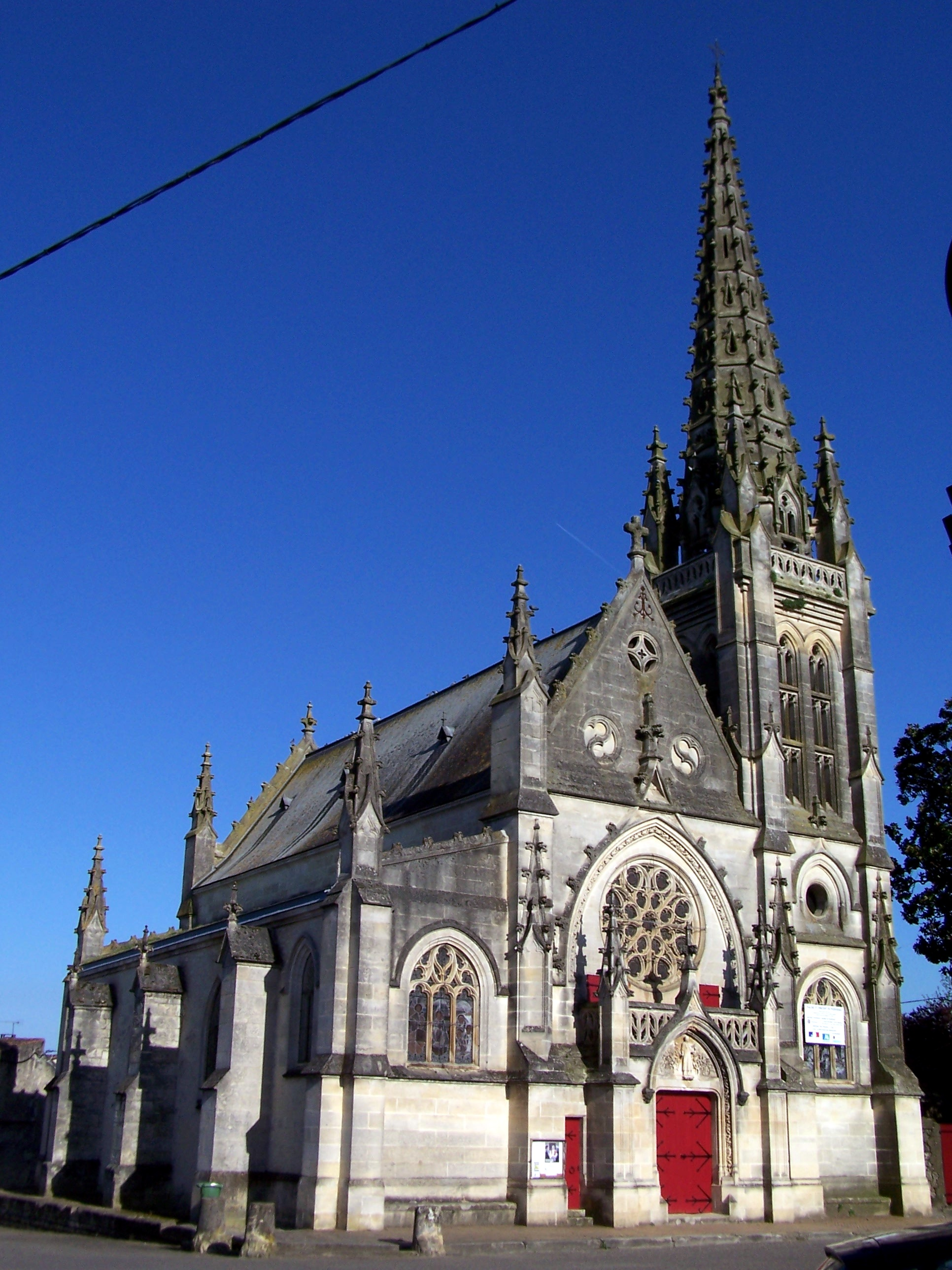
Eglise Saint-Vincent (avr. 2013)

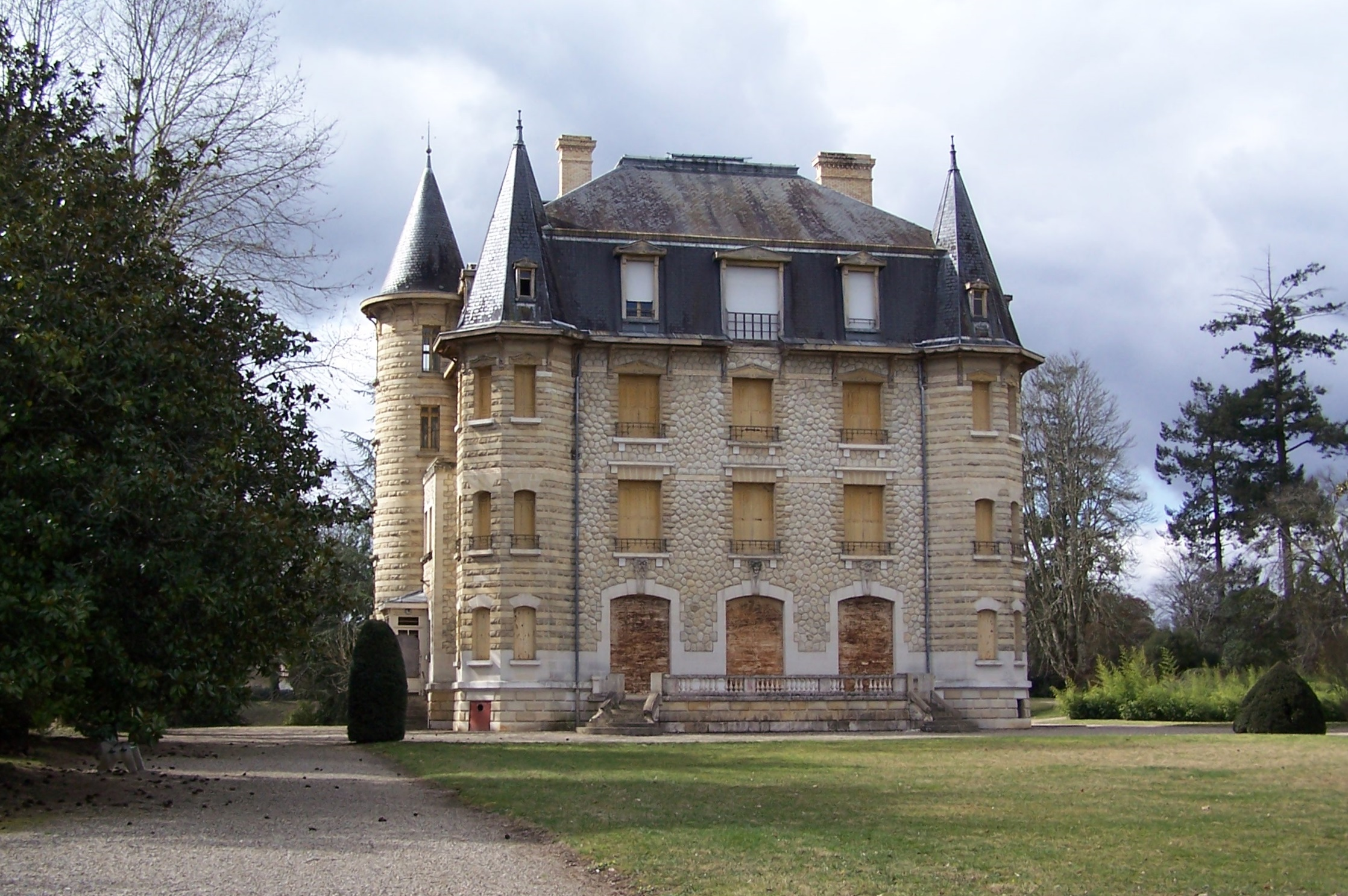
Château Chavat (mars 2012)

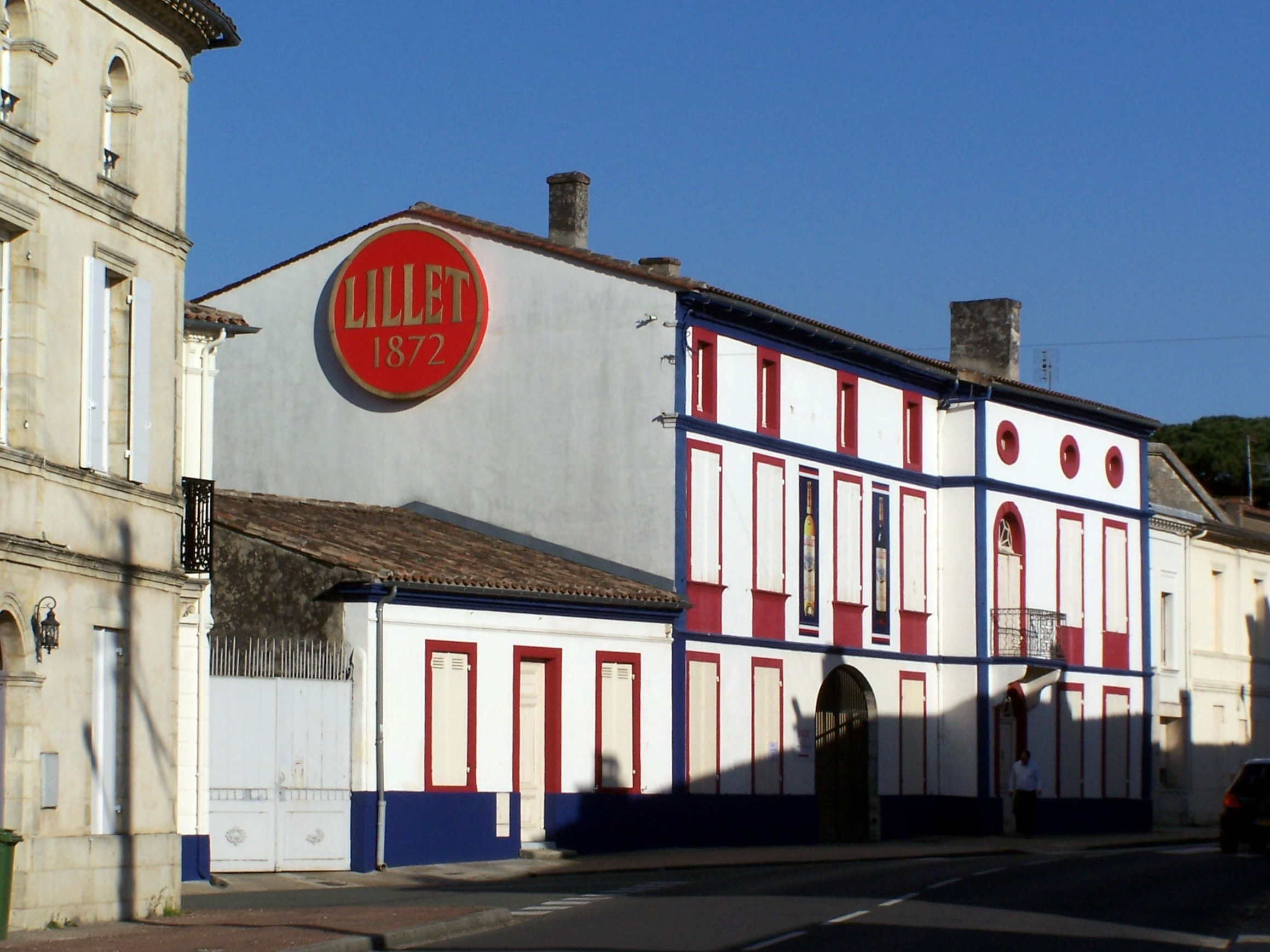
Lillet company(avr. 2013)

== See also ==
- Communes of the Gironde department
- http://www.podensac.fr City website (in French)
