= Vesper (cocktail) =

Cocktail originally made of gin, vodka and Kina Lillet

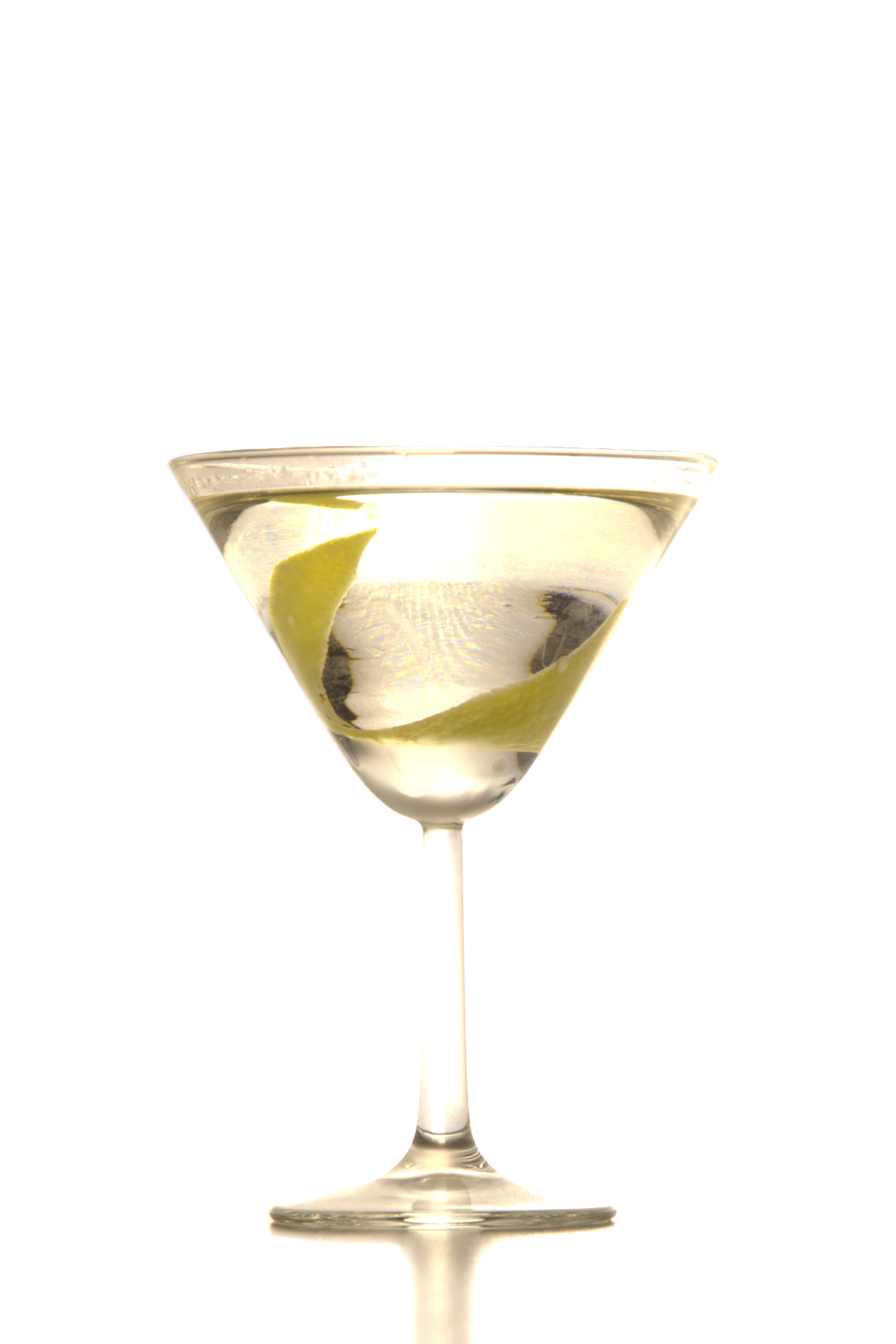
- Type: Cocktail
- Ingredients: 45 ml gin; 15 ml vodka; 7.5 ml Lillet Blanc
- Base spirit: Gin
- Standard drinkware: Cocktail glass
- Standard garnish: lemon zest
- Served: Straight up: chilled, without ice
- Preparation: Pour all ingredients into a cocktail shaker filled with ice cubes. Shake and strain into a chilled cocktail glass.

The Vesper is a cocktail that was originally made of gin, vodka, and Kina Lillet. Since that form of Lillet is no longer produced, modern bartenders need to modify the recipe to mimic the original taste, with Lillet Blanc or Cocchi Americano as a typical substitute.

The drink was popularised by author Ian Fleming (1908–1964) in his 1953 novel Casino Royale, in which the character James Bond invents the recipe and names the cocktail after Vesper Lynd. Fleming's Bond calls it a "special martini", and though it lacks the vermouth that defined a martini in Fleming's day, it is sometimes called a Vesper martini.

== History ==
In Ian Fleming's Casino Royale, the first of his works to feature James Bond, Bond orders a dry martini in a "deep champagne goblet" but then changes his order and gives the barman a recipe. The dialogue is:

Just a moment. Three measures of Gordon's, one of vodka, half a measure of Kina Lillet. Shake it very well until it's ice-cold, then add a large thin slice of lemon peel. Got it? ... This drink's my own invention. I'm going to patent it when I think of a good name.

Bond deems the result "excellent" and calls it a "special martini". (Note: After tasting the resulting drink and watching "as the deep glass became frosted with the pale golden drink, slightly aerated by the bruising of the shaker", Bond advises the barman: "Excellent ... but if you can get a vodka made with grain instead of potatoes, you will find it still better." He then gently mocks himself for making such a fine distinction.) Later in the novel, after being introduced to the beautiful Vesper Lynd, Bond tells Vesper that his search for a name is over if she will permit him to name the drink after her.

The cocktail was not Fleming's creation. It was devised by his friend Ivar Bryce as evidenced by the words Fleming inscribed in Bryce's copy of Casino Royale: "For Ivar, who mixed the first Vesper and said the good word." Naming a cocktail the Vesper was Fleming's idea though he drew inspiration from someone else's joke. He had encountered the term at evening drinks when a butler announced: "Vespers are served." Fleming adapted this pun on the name of the religious observance normally held about sunset, "Vespers". And Bond alludes to this by praising his cocktail's name as "very appropriate to the violet hour when my cocktail will now be drunk all over the world".

Just as the character Vesper Lynd dies in Casino Royale, the cocktail named for her makes no appearance in any of Fleming's later Bond novels. Fleming, in a letter to The Guardian in 1958, said that when he tasted a Vesper for the first time "several months" after including it in his novel, he found it "unpalatable".

Although the production of Kina Lillet ceased in 1986, in the 2006 film Casino Royale, Bond (Daniel Craig) gives the barman (Stephen Ucík) the same recipe as he does in the novel. (Note: Two other characters promptly ask for the same, and a third for the same without the lemon garnish.) When Vesper (Eva Green) asks Bond if he named the drink after her "because of the bitter aftertaste", Bond replies that he did so "because once you've tasted it, that's all you want to drink." (Note: The 1967 film also titled Casino Royale was a spoof of the Bond franchise. Vesper Lynd makes an appearance but not the cocktail.)

The Vesper, including its original recipe recited by a barman (Jake Seal), appeared again in the film Quantum of Solace (2008), a sequel to Casino Royale based on the Bond character but no specific work of Fleming's.

Unlike the vodka martini and the mojito, popularised by the Bond films Dr. No (1962) and Die Another Day (2002), respectively, the Vesper did not become a familiar cocktail, likely because the Kina Lillet and later the substitute Lillet Blanc, were not widely distributed.

== Contemporary versions ==
Because the production of Kina Lillet, a fruit-and-spice flavoured apéritif wine from Bordeaux, ceased in 1986, the original recipe can no longer be used to reproduce the Fleming-Bond cocktail faithfully. Substitute ingredients attempt to recapture the original flavor of the drink.

The International Bartenders Association (IBA) recipe calls for 45 ml gin, 15 ml vodka, and 7.5 ml Lillet Blanc in place of Kina Lillet. Others find Lillet Blanc an inadequate substitute for Kina Lillet, as it lacks the latter's quinine which added a distinctive taste, while Kingsley Amis thought the original drink too bitter and improved by substituting Lillet Blanc. Another alternative to Lillet is Cocchi Americano, a similar aromatised wine, which results in a more bitter finish than Lillet Blanc. Another suggested substitute is Kina L'Aéro d'Or. In 2006, Esquire suggested adding quinine powder to replace what Lillet Blanc lacks, or as a last resort ("in desperation") adding bitters. (Note: "Shake (if you must) with plenty of cracked ice. 3 oz Tanqueray gin, 1 oz 100-proof [50%] Stolichnaya vodka, 1/2 oz Lillet Blanc, 1/8 teaspoon (or less) quinine powder or, in desperation, 2 dashes of bitters. Strain into a chilled cocktail glass and twist a large swatch of thin-cut lemon peel over the top.") Others such as Ulysses Lisbon Speakeasy uses Suze (original recipe) as another substitute for the Original Kina Lillet.

The authors of a 2018 book Cocktail Codex recommend different proportions of the ingredients. Their "classic" Vesper recipe calls for one and a half ounces of gin, three quarters of an ounce of vodka half of an ounce of Lillet Blanc and a lemon twist for garnish. The justification for those proportions is to "stretch out the gin's botanicals and allow the Lillet to shine". More precisely, the authors use Plymouth gin and Aylesbury Duck vodka.

Less attention has focused on the other spirits and their alcohol content, but both Tanqueray and Stolichnaya are sometimes mentioned.

Although Bond drinks the first Vesper from a "deep glass", presumably the "deep champagne goblet" he specified when ordering a martini before substituting the Vesper's recipe, cocktail glasses are commonly used in modern versions of this drink, as Esquire and the IBA recommend.

== See also ==
- List of cocktails
