= Cafe Royal Cocktail Book =

Collection of cocktail recipes

- Author: William J. Tarling
- Illustrator: Frederick Carter
- Publisher: United Kingdom Bartenders Guild/Pall Mall Ltd
- Publication date: 1937

The Cafe Royal Cocktail Book is a collection of cocktail recipes compiled by William J. Tarling, published by the United Kingdom Bartenders Guild in 1937. It contains a number of pioneering recipes, including the 20th Century and what may have later become the margarita.

== Content ==
The book focuses on cocktails developed in the 1920s and 1930s as well as those already approved, developed and used by members of the Bartender's Guild. It also contains some of the earliest known recipes for a range of cocktails. Fewer than 25 copies were originally published by the guild.

Tarling compiled the book to raise funds for the guild's sickness fund and the Café Royal's sports club fund whilst he was serving as head bartender at the Cafe Royal.

== Notable cocktails ==
A number of notable cocktails are detailed in the book, including the first recorded recipe of the 20th Century, several references to absinthe and some of the earliest known recipes for drinks made with tequila and vodka. An early reference to a possible precursor to the margarita was in the book, where it was called a Picador, which did not require a salt-rimmed glass, but used almost the same 7:4:3 ratio (2:1:1 in the book) of concentrations of tequila, freshly squeezed lime juice (or lemon juice, which is not an official margarita ingredient) and Cointreau triple sec. The book borrowed heavily from Tarling's previous composition of cocktails, the Approved Cocktails of the UKBG, which contained drinks developed by members of the guild.

== Facsimile edition ==
There was only one printing of the original edition of the book, and copies have become difficult to find. In 2008 the UKBG, Universal Exposition of Wines and Spirits, and Mixellany Limited reproduced a facsimile edition.

== Illustrations ==
The original book was illustrated by Frederick Carter, an Associate of the Royal Society of Etchers, Engravers and Illustrators from Bradford.
