= Old Etonian (cocktail) =

Gin cocktail

- Type: Cocktail
- Ingredients: 1.5 oz. gin; 1.5 oz. Kina Lillet or Cocchi Americano; 2 dashes Orange bitters; 2 dashes Crème de Noyaux
- Standard drinkware: Cocktail glass
- Standard garnish: orange peel
- Served: chilled and strained
- Preparation: Shake with ice and strain into a stemmed cocktail glass.

An Old Etonian is a gin cocktail which enjoyed great popularity in London, circa 1925. The cocktail takes its name from Eton College and from the college's alumni, who are often referred to as Old Etonians. The Garden Hotel in London is an example of an establishment that had mastered the Old Etonian cocktail during that era.

== Recipe and preparation ==
- Gin (1.5 oz.);
- Kina Lillet (1.5 oz.); (Cocchi Americano is considered an acceptable substitute for Kina Lillet, which is no longer available.)
- Orange bitters (2 dashes);
- Crème de Noyaux (2 dashes);
- Shake with ice and strain into a stemmed cocktail glass. Garnish with a twist of orange peel.

== See also ==
- List of cocktails
