= Contratto =

Italian alcoholic beverage company

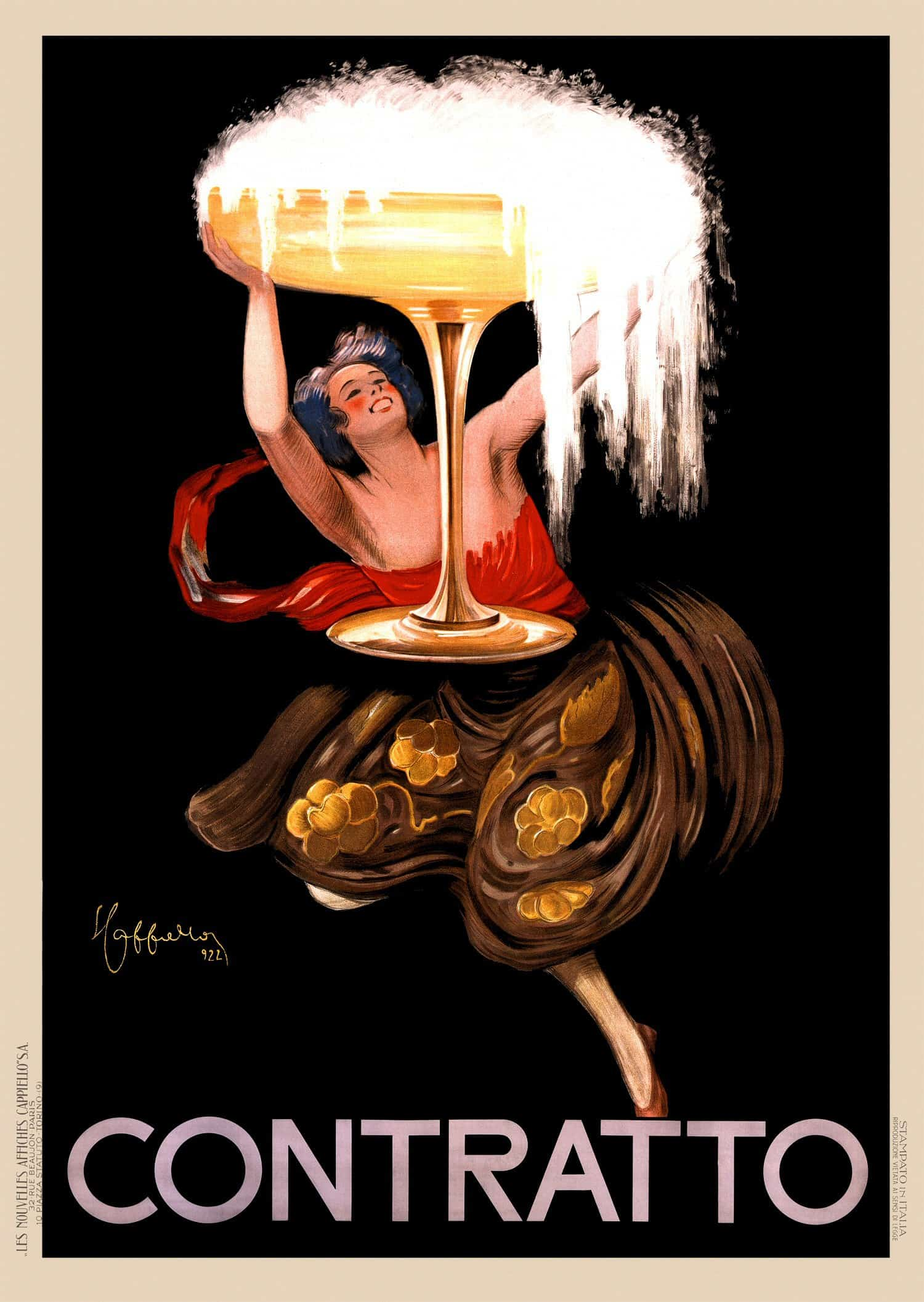
- Industry: Alcoholic beverages
- Founded: 1867
- Headquarters: Canelli, Italy
- Key people: Giuseppe Contratto
- Products: sparkling wine, vermouth, Americano
- Website: contratto.it

Contratto is an Italian alcoholic beverage company which produces sparkling wine, vermouth, and Contratto Americano Rosso.

Leonetto Cappiello created ads for Contratto.
