= 20th century (cocktail) =

Cocktail of gin, Kina Lillet and creme de cacao

- Ingredients: 4.5 cl Gin; 2 cl Kina Lillet; 1.5 cl light creme de cacao; 2 cl fresh lemon juice
- Preparation: Shake in an iced cocktail shaker, and strain into a cocktail glass. Garnish with a lemon twist.

The 20th century is a cocktail created in 1937 by a British bartender named C.A. Tuck, and named in honor of the celebrated 20th Century Limited train which ran between New York City and Chicago from 1902 until 1967. The recipe was first published in 1937 in the Café Royal Cocktail Book by William J Tarling, President of the United Kingdom Bartenders' Guild and head bartender at the Café Royal.

== Recipe ==
=== Ingredients ===
- 1 1/2 US fl oz (1/3 gi; 4.5 cl) gin
- 3/4 US fl oz (1/6 gi; 2 cl) Kina Lillet
- 1/2 (or less, depending on taste) US fl oz (1/8 gi; 1.5 cl) light creme de cacao
- 3/4 US fl oz (1/6 gi; 2 cl) fresh lemon juice

=== Procedure ===
Shake in an iced cocktail shaker, and strain into a cocktail glass. Garnish with a lemon twist.

== See also ==
- List of cocktails
- List of IBA official cocktails
