= Cocco (name) =

Cocco is a surname. Notable people with the name include:

- Adelasia Cocco (1885–1983), one of the first female doctors in Italy
- Anastasio Cocco (1799–1854), Italian naturalist
- Andrea Cocco (born 1986), Italian footballer
- Daisy Cocco De Filippis (born 1949), Dominican-American academic and administrator
- Davide Cocco Palmieri (1632–1711), Roman Catholic prelate from Italy
- Giovanni Cocco (1921–2007), Italian weightlifter
- Jorge Cocco Santángelo (born 1936), Argentine painter and academic
- Miguel Cocco (1946–2009), Dominican businessman and politician
- Patricia Cocco (born 1971), Brazilian volleyballer
- Roberto Cocco (born 1977), Italian kickboxer and boxer
- Victorio Cocco (born 1946), Argentine footballer

Other people:

- Cocco, stage name of Makishi Satoko (born 1977), Japanese singer

== See also ==
- Cocco Bill, Italian comics character
- Di Cocco, a list of people with the surname Di Cocco
- Francesco Cocco-Ortu (1842–1929), Italian politician
