= Igino Cocchi =

Italian geologist and palaeontologist (1827–1913)

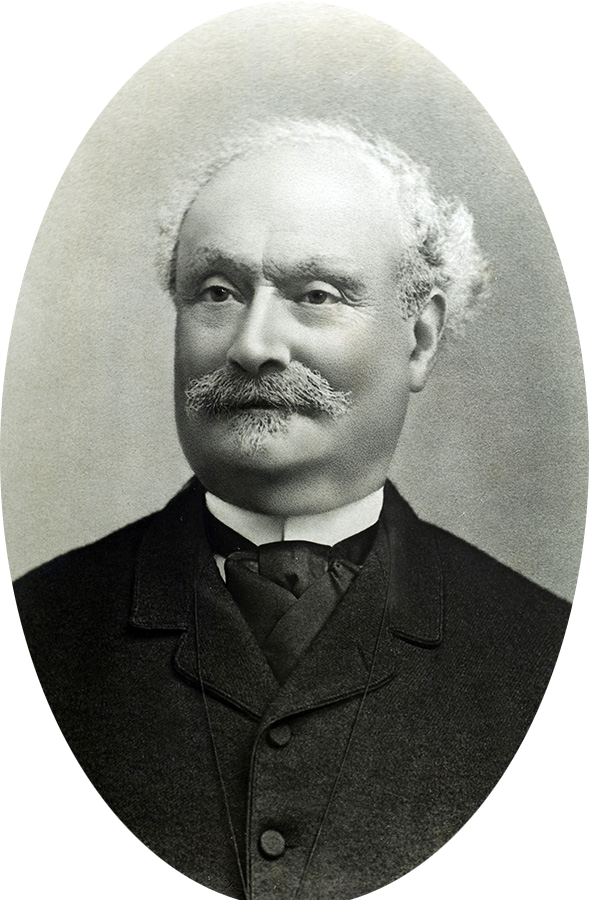
Igino Cocchi, c. 1900

Igino Cocchi (27 October 1827 – 18 August 1913) was an Italian geologist and palaeontologist who worked at the Museum of Natural History, Florence. He was a founding member of the Geological Committee of Italy and sought to establish an institution to promote the study of geology.

Cocchi was born in Terrarossa, Val di Magra, where and studied Latin and natural sciences, graduating from the University of Pisa, training under Giuseppe Meneghini, and Paulo Savi. Savi wanted him to teach zoology but Meneghini wanted him to study geology and palaeontology. He travelled to England during which time he made contact with Roderich Impey Murchison and Charles Darwin. He also visited the Geological Society and the School of Mines. He had also visited the Société géologique de France in Paris and decided that Italy needed a similar institution. He attempted to gain state sponsorship for research along with Quintino Sella and Felice Giordano, but was unsuccessful. In 1860, he became a professor of geology in Florence while also curator of palaeontology at the museum there. The Paris Exposition of 1866, however, led to a request for a geological map of Italy, and Cocchi was able to put together a map of central and northern Italy at the scale of 1:600,000; however, it was never printed. A geological committee was established in 1867, and he was appointed as president, serving until 1873. He founded the Alpine Club of Florence in 1867 and the first Italian geology journal Bollettino del Reale Comitato Geologico d’Italia. He was involved in studies of the Apuan marble sources, sulfur, salt and coal mines. He was involved in the design of the Florentine aqueduct. He also studied fossil Labroids and human remains. At the age of 75, he became interested in the culture of Finland and translated the Kalevala into Italian.
