= Jorge Cocco Santángelo =

- Born: Jorge Cocco Santángelo; 1936 (age 89–90); Concepción del Uruguay, Argentina
- Known for: Painting, Education
- Notable work: Sacrocubism
- Spouse: Myriam Verbauwen
- Awards: Purchase Award, International Art Competition, Church History Museum
- Website: jorgecocco.com

Jorge Cocco Santángelo (born 1936) is a painter and professor of art from Argentina. He paints in a style he describes as ‘sacrocubism’ which portrays sacred events with several features of the post-cubist art movement.

== Biography ==
Cocco Santángelo was born in Concepción del Uruguay, Entre Ríos, Argentina, an Argentine city that lies on the western shores of the Uruguay River. Raised Catholic, he married Myriam Verbauwen in February 1962. They joined the Church of Jesus Christ of Latter-day Saints in June of that year, becoming Argentine pioneers.

Owing to their financial situation at the time and the lack of temples in South America, Santángelo and his wife were not able to be sealed together in the temple until 11 years after their baptisms. They traveled to Utah and were sealed in the Salt Lake City Temple on October 4, 1973. Four years later, they were sealed as a family to five of their children in the Bern Switzerland Temple.

== Career ==
Cocco Santángelo likes to experiment with his art and explore new styles and cultures eventually settling on ‘sacrocubism’. As he experimented with approaches and mediums he made a living teaching art and art history. Moving for his career the family traveled to Ibiza, Spain; Puebla, Mexico; back to Argentina; and later to the United States.

Cocco Santángelo has taught art at numerous universities including University of the Americas in Puebla, Mexico; College Cesaseo B. de Quiros de Concordia in Entre Ríos, Argentina; and the Universidad de Belgrano in Buenos Aires, Argentina. Over the years he began to gain more acclaim and success as an artist. Numerous museums own pieces of his artwork including the Church History Museum in Salt Lake City, Utah, USA; Museums Municipales de San Telmo y La Case de Oquendo in San Sebastian, Spain; and the Museum of Washi Zokey in Setagaya, Tokyo, Japan.

His artwork has been included in numerous group shows and dozens of one-man shows since 1965. His series Sacred Events in the Life of Christ was displayed at the Spori Gallery at Brigham Young University-Idaho in Rexburg, Idaho. In 2020, Cocco Santángelo was the subject of controversy when a Catholic publishing company erroneously used his image of the angel Moroni on the cover of two Catholic publications.

== Personal life ==
Cocco Santángelo and wife Myriam Verbauwen are the parents of six children. He is a member of The Church of Jesus Christ of Latter-day Saints.
