= Francesco Cocchi =

Italian painter (1788–1865)

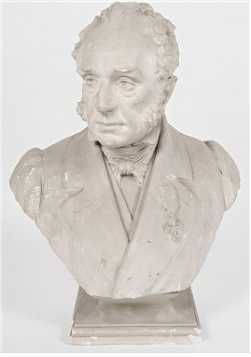
Bust of Francesco Cocchi

Francesco Cocchi (Budrio, 13 February 1788 - Bologna, 1865) was an Italian painter and scenic designer.

== Biography ==
He trained under Antonio Basoli, a Neoclassical painter and incisor. For many years, he worked in Hamburg, Germany as a scenic designer. He became professor of perspective at the Accademia Clementina, and published in 1855 a text on the subject.
