= Cocchi Americano =

Aperitif wine from the Asti province of Italy

Cocchi Aperitivo Americano
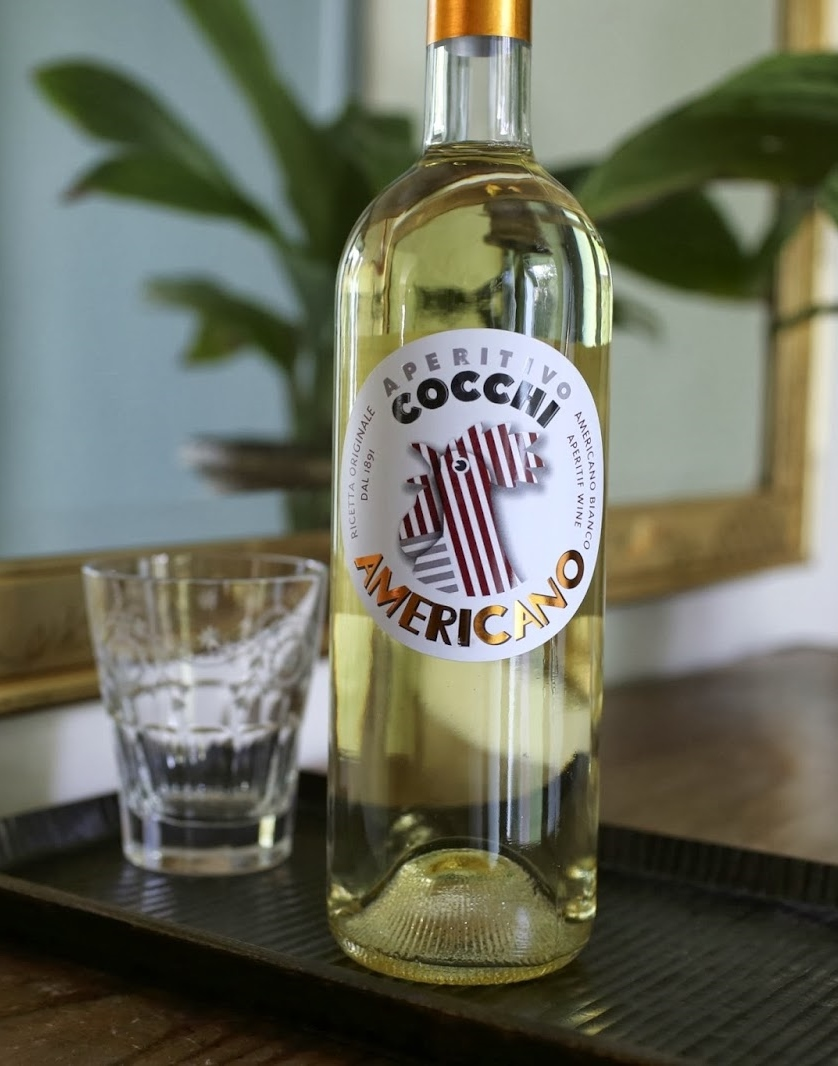
- A bottle of Cocchi Americano Bianco, produced by Giulio Cocchi Spumanti
- Type: Americano
- Manufacturer: Giulio Cocchi Spumanti
- Origin: Italy
- Introduced: 1891
- Alcohol by volume: 16.5%
- Colour: Golden
- Website: cocchi.it

Cocchi Americano (Italian pronunciation: [/ˈkɔkki ameriˈkano/]) is a quinine-flavored aperitif wine produced by Giulio Cocchi Spumanti in the Asti province of Italy. Cocchi Americano is a variety of Americano. The wine was developed by Giulio Cocchi, and production began in 1891. Cocchi also produces a pink variety of this aperitif, the "Cocchi Americano Rosa", which is slightly more bitter and aromatic than the standard white Cocchi Americano.

== Press and awards ==
Cocchi Americano gained prominence from its use in James Bond's Vesper as a substitute for Kina Lillet, which is no longer available. It is also used in the Corpse Reviver #2 and in other cocktails.

Cocchi Americano is generally considered to be the nearest contemporary drink to the original Kina Lillet and is often used as a replacement.
