= Giulio Cocchi Spumanti =

Winery in Asti, Italy

Coordinates: 45.084824°N 8.0664755°E

The historical headquarters of the company in Asti

Giulio Cocchi Spumanti is a winery based in Asti, in the Italian Piedmont region, since 1891. The company was founded by Giulio Cocchi, a pastry chef originally from Tuscany who moved his business to the north-western Italian town of Asti in the late 19th century. The founder was interested in the pairing of food and wines he found in Asti, the capital of Moscato wines, and began producing aromatic-infused wines and sparkling wines. By the turn of the century his Barolo Chinato and Aperitivo Americano had become commercially successful in Piedmont, London, New York, Africa and South America.

The company now produces traditional method and metodo Martinotti sparkling wines, Barolo Chinato, vermouth and aperitif wine such as Cocchi Americano. All Cocchi products are wine based and the founder's recipes are still used.

Giulio Cocchi Spumanti is listed on the "Registro Nazionale delle Imprese Storiche" (the National List of Historical Companies).

== Products ==
The company produces sparkling wine made from grapes like Moscato, Chardonnay and Pinot noir, and fortified wines such as the Vermouth di Torino, which was awarded Best Sweet Vermouth in the "2014 Bartender's Best Awards" competition, and the Cocchi Americano, which was used in James Bond's martini in the film Skyfall.
