= Dubonnet =

French wine-based aperitif

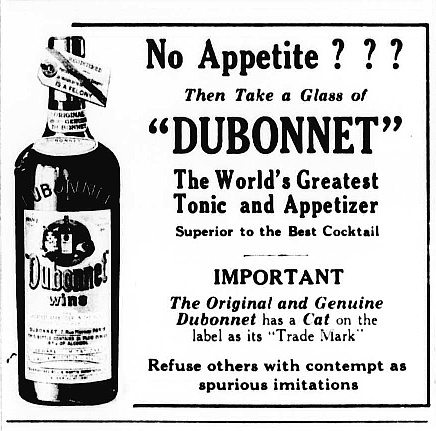
1915 advertisement

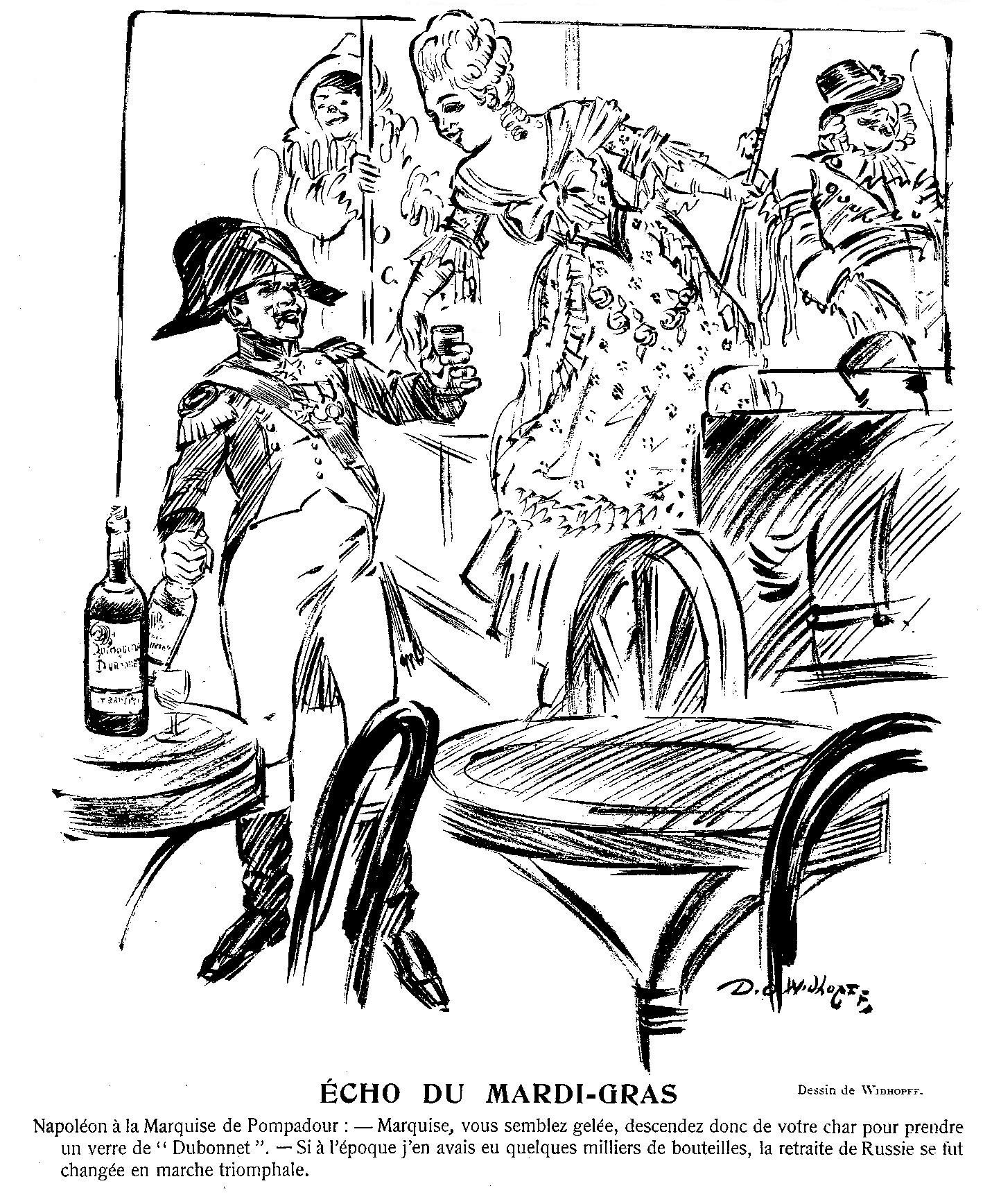
Dubonnet advertisement, 1907 — Napoleon and Madame de Pompadour share a bottle during Fat Tuesday of carnival. The caption, idiomatically rendered, roughly says: (Napoleon Bonaparte to Mme. the Marchioness de Pompadour) "My dear Marchioness, you seem frozen, come down from your carriage and have a glass of Dubonnet. If, at the time, I had but had a few thousand bottles, my retreat from Russia would have changed into a march of triumph!"

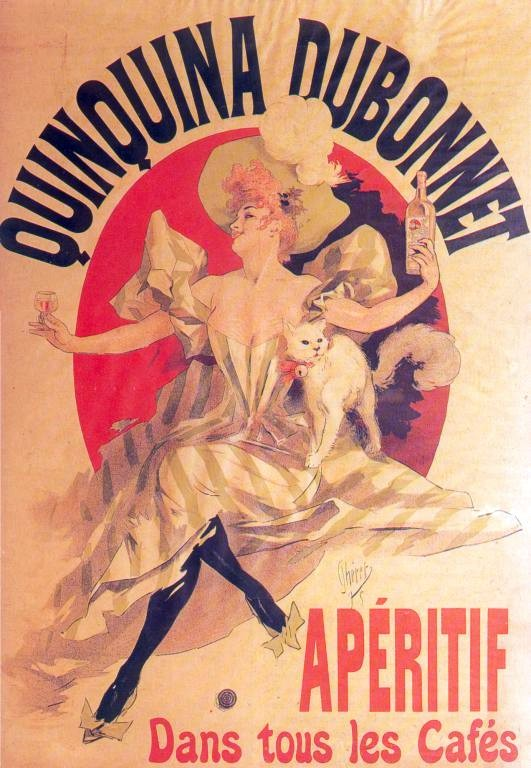
Dubonnet poster (1895)

Dubonnet (UK: /djuːˈbɒneɪ/, US: /ˌdjuːbəˈneɪ/, French: [dybɔnɛ]) is a sweet, aromatised wine-based quinquina, often consumed as an aperitif. It is a blend of fortified wine, herbs, and spices (including a small amount of quinine), with fermentation being stopped by the addition of alcohol. It is currently produced in France by Pernod Ricard, and in the United States by Heaven Hill Distilleries of Bardstown, Kentucky. The French-made version is 14.8% alcohol by volume and the U.S. version 19%. The beverage is famous in the United Kingdom for having been the favourite drink of Queen Elizabeth II and Queen Elizabeth the Queen Mother.

In November 2021, Dubonnet was awarded a Royal Warrant by Queen Elizabeth II.

== Ingredients ==
Four main ingredients are used:

- Red wine base: a blend of Ruby Red, Ruby Cabernet and Muscat of Alexandria grapes;
- Herbs and spices: blackcurrant, essence of tea varietals, other ingredients;
- Cinchona bark: giving a dry tannin note
- Cane sugar: 100% cane sugar.

== History ==
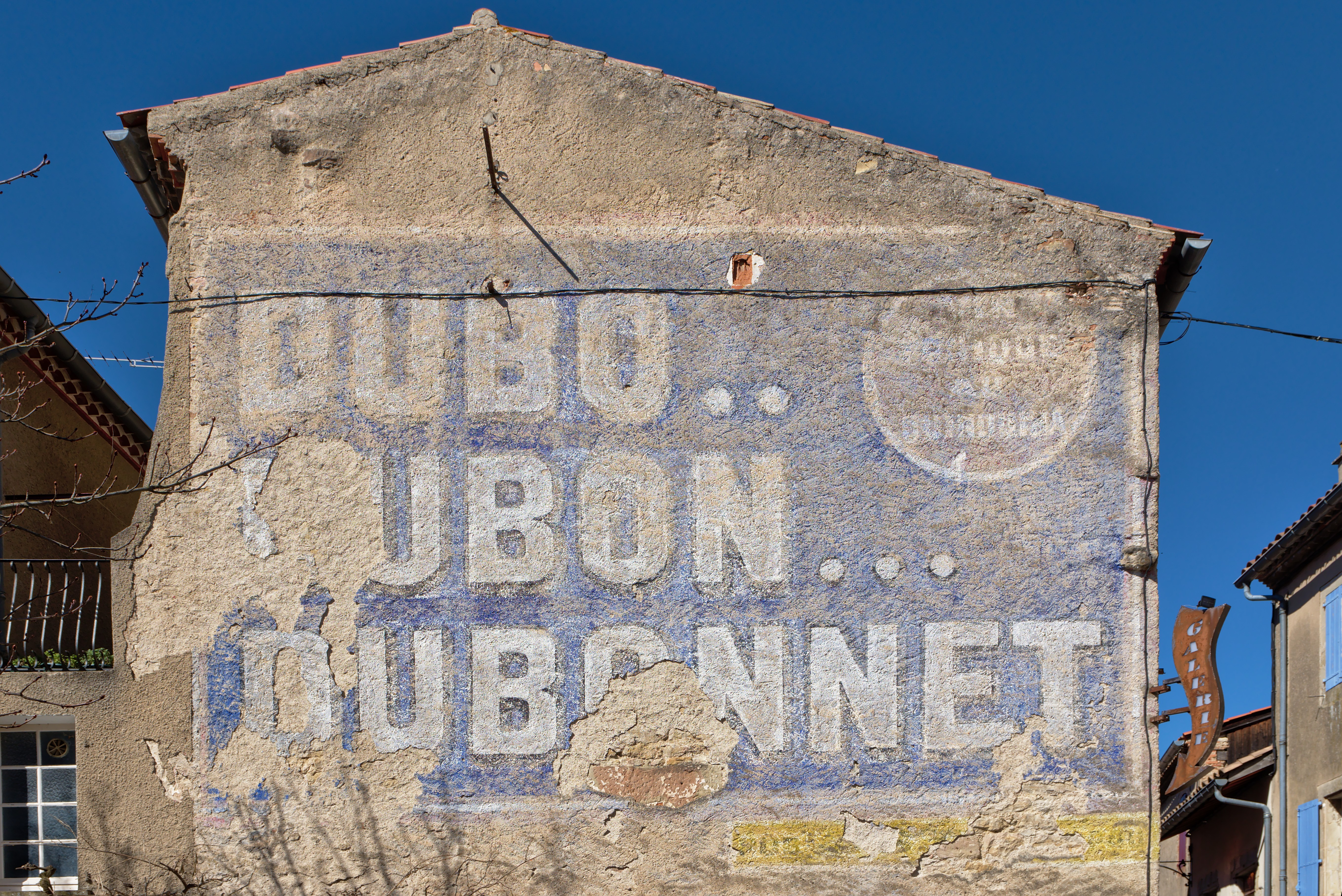
Faded Dubonnet advertisement on a wall, Lautrec, 2018

Dubonnet was first sold in 1846 by Joseph Dubonnet, in response to a competition by the French Government to find a way for French Foreign Legionnaires in North Africa to drink quinine. Quinine combats malaria but is very bitter.

Ownership was taken over by Pernod Ricard in 1976. It was re-popularised in the late 1970s by an advertising campaign starring Pia Zadora. It is available in Rouge, Blanc and Gold (vanilla and orange) varieties. Dubonnet is also widely known by the advertisement slogan of the French graphic designer Cassandre "Dubo, Dubon, Dubonnet" (a play on words roughly meaning "It's nice; it's good; it's Dubonnet"), which still can be found on the walls of houses in France. The brand later became owned by Heaven Hill.

Dubonnet is commonly mixed with lemonade or bitter lemon, and forms part of many cocktails.

Reputedly, Dubonnet was a favourite beverage of:

- Queen Elizabeth the Queen Mother, who liked gin and Dubonnet: 30% gin, 70% Dubonnet, with a slice of lemon under the ice. She once noted before a trip, "I think that I will take two small bottles of Dubonnet and gin with me this morning, in case it is needed."
- Queen Elizabeth II, who liked 33% gin and 66% Dubonnet, with two cubes of ice and a lemon slice before lunch every day.
- Nelson Rockefeller, whose taste for alcohol was moderate, would have an occasional glass of Dubonnet on the rocks.
- William Hanson, and Jordan North on their podcast Help I Sexted My Boss.

== Cocktails ==
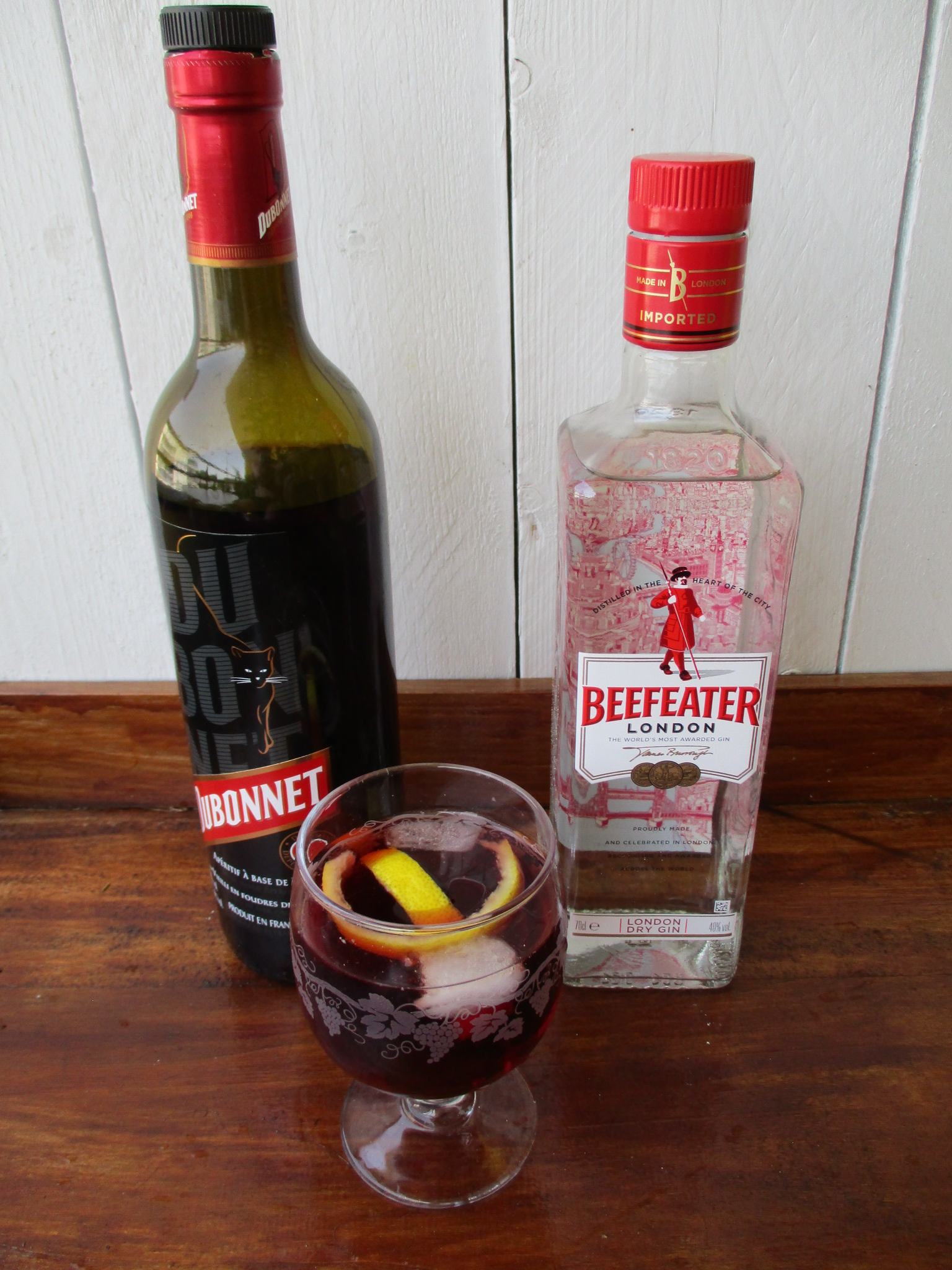
A bottle of Dubonnet, a bottle of gin, and the cocktail Queen’s Dubonnet

The following include Dubonnet as one of their ingredients:

- The Alfonso
- Apple Dubonnet
- Arnaud's Special (New Orleans)
- Bartender
- Bentley
- Blackthorn Cocktail
- Bossunova Belt
- Deshler
- Dot-Roy
- Dubonnet Cassis
- Dubonnet Cocktail
- Dubonnet Daniella
- Dubonnet Delight
- Dubonnet Fizz
- Dubonnet Helado
- Dubonnet Highball
- Dubonnet Kiss
- Dubonnet Manhattan
- Dubonnet Negroni
- Dubonnet Royal
- Dubonnet TT
- Gin & Dubonnet
- Jack London Martini
- Karl-Gerhard
- Magic Juice
- Marble Hill
- The Mexican
- Mummy Love
- Napoleon
- Opera Cocktail
- Phoebe Snow
- The Queen Mother
- Red Moonlight
- Rum Dubonnet
- San Diego Cocktail
- Savoy Hotel Special
- Trois Rivieres
- Zaza

== See also ==
- Gin and tonic, another drink invented to encourage European colonial soldiers in South Asian tropical climates to take quinine.
