= Ginepro Cocchi =

Italian priest (1908–1939)

Ginepro Cocchi OMI
- Born: 13 October 1908; Artena, Rome, Kingdom of Italy
- Died: 6 March 1939 (aged 30); Shangliandi, Shanxi, China

Ginepro Cocchi, OFM (13 October 1908 – 6 March 1939), born Antonio Cocchi, was an Italian religious priest of the Order of Friars Minor. He took the name of Ginepro after admittance into the Franciscan order. He served in the missions in China until 1939, when he was killed while evangelising in Chinese villages. He is buried in China.

He is a candidate for beatification with the title Servant of God.

== Life ==
Antonio Cocchi was born in Artena on 13 October 1908 to Attilio Cocchi and Italia Cioccali.

He commenced his studies for the priesthood in 1918 and was noted for his innocence and his mode of life. These mirrored the observations of the rector Elia Carosi, who was struck by the humble and diligent seminarian. He entered the novitiate of the Order of Friars Minor in Rieti on 10 September 1923, and he later assumed the habit with the name of "Ginepro". He made his simple vows on 15 October 1924. Among his classmates while undergoing theological studies in Rome were Giuseppe Beschin and Gabriele Allegra. He made his solemn profession on 8 December 1929, and on 19 July 1931, he was ordained to priesthood in the church of Sant'Ignazio. He celebrated his first Mass on 2 August.

Cocchi and 33 other missionaries had a private audience with Pope Pius XI in 1931, and on 30 September, the 34 men embarked for China to work in the missions. Two months after his arrival, he and fifteen other Franciscans met the Apostolic Vicar Agapito Fiorentini. He continued his theological studies and was sent to Kuo-hsien; he reached Ting-Shaing at the beginning of 1933, where he mastered the Chinese language. Seven months later, he was entrusted with several villages to work in.

On 6 March 1939, he arrived in the village of Shangliandi. One day, 30 communist soldiers burst into his room. He was beaten and dragged out of the village, where he was shot dead.

== Beatification process ==
The beatification process did not commence in China but did all of its work in Velletri-Segni after the cause was introduced under Pope John Paul II on 17 December 1994, which granted him the title Servant of God. The process saw the accumulation of documentation and witness testimonies spanning from 12 March 1995 until 3 March 1996; the process was ratified on 29 March 1996 in order for the cause to proceed to the next stage. The positio was sent to the Congregation for the Causes of Saints for further evaluation in 1999 and was given to the historical archive for their inspection on 9 March 1999. From there, it proceeded to advising theologians on 9 September 2008 and then to the members of the congregation itself in 2010.
