= Crème de Noyaux =

Almond-flavored crème liqueur

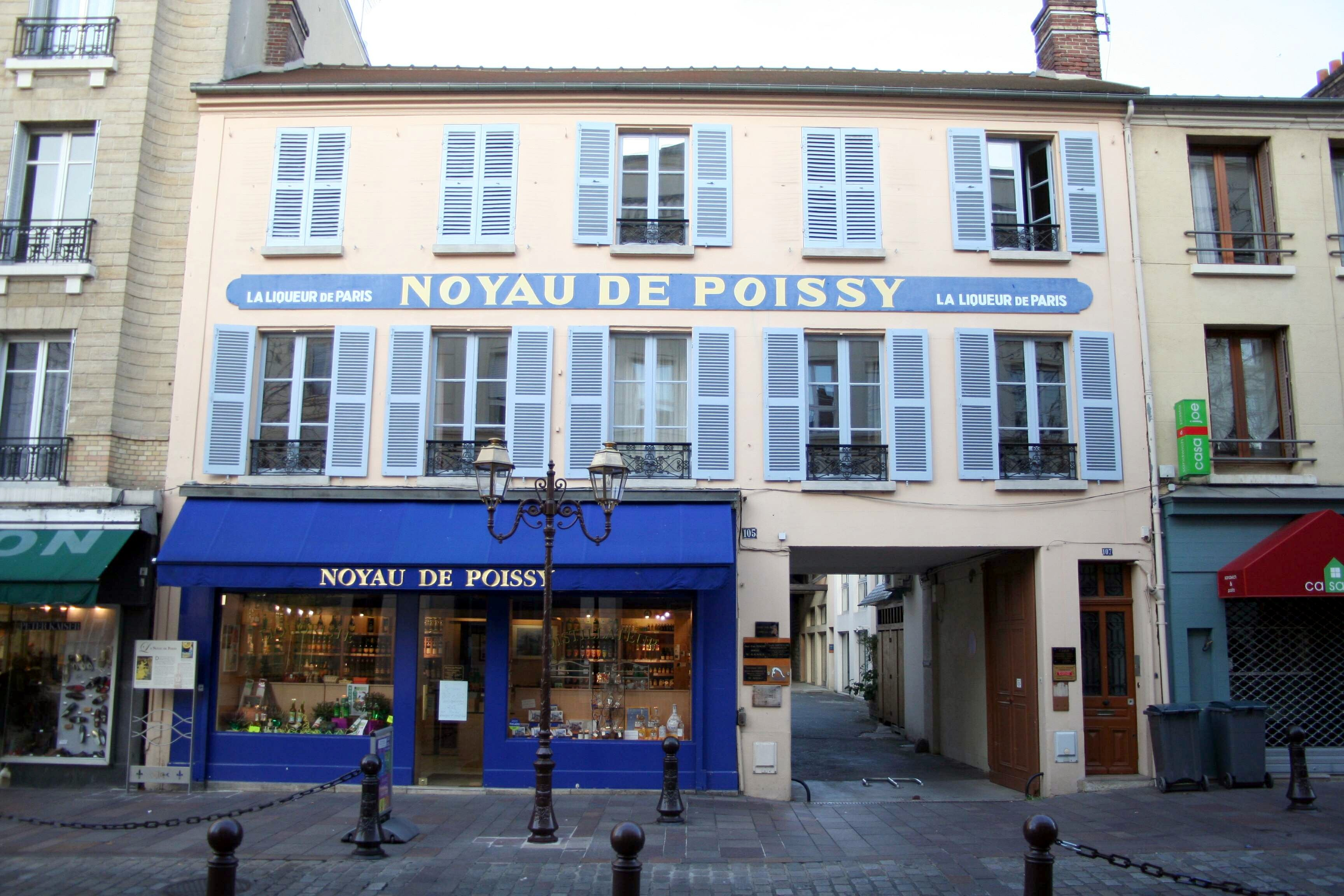
- Noyau de Poissy, Yvelines (France)
- Type: Liqueur
- Manufacturer: Bols, Hiram Walker, Tempus Fugit, Company Vedrenne.
- Alcohol by volume: 20% U.S., 40% original and French
- Proof (US): 40 U.S., 80 original and French
- Color: Pink or clear
- Flavour: almond

Crème de Noyaux (pronounced [kʁɛm də nwajo]) is an almond-flavored crème liqueur, although it is actually made from apricot kernels or the kernels of peach or cherry pits, which provide an almond-like flavor. Both Bols and Hiram Walker produce artificially colored red versions of the liqueur (either of which contribute the pink hue to Pink Squirrel cocktails) while Noyau de Poissy from France is available in both clear (blanc) and barrel-aged amber (ambre) versions.

Historically, crème de Noyaux would contain trace amounts of amygdalin which converts to hydrogen cyanide upon ingestion. Hydrogen cyanide can be fatally toxic in large enough quantities. Inspired by this fact, Dorothy Sayers wrote in her short story "Bitter Almonds" (collected in In the Teeth of the Evidence, 1939) that the first glass of an old bottle of Noyeau could poison someone due to the hydrogen cyanide which accumulates in the oil at the surface of the liquid, however this hypothesis isn’t supported by any scientific evidence.

The name comes from the French noyau: "kernel, pit, or core". It is an ingredient in the Fairbank cocktail, the Pink Squirrel cocktail and in a cocktail called Old Etonian.

In 2013, Tempus Fugit Spirits recreated a 19th-century-style Crème de Noyaux – distilling both apricot and cherry pits, amongst other botanicals, and coloring the liqueur with red cochineal, as was done in the past. Care was taken to remove the trace elements of hydrogen cyanide produced in the process.

== Noyau de Poissy ==
Noyau de Poissy is a liqueur made from apricot kernel almonds, macerated or distilled in a superfine alcohol, in the presence, according to the recipes, of fine wine brandy, enriched with plants and subtly flavored. There are therefore 2 Noyau de Poissy liqueurs:

- The Silver Goblet has an alcohol content of 25%, is amber in color and offers a scent of sweet almond pleasantly carried by a fine note of Armagnac;
- The Seal of Saint Louis is a spirit with 40% alcohol, is transparent and expresses an elegant, powerful and very expressive scent of sweet almond with notes of frangipane and orange blossom.

It should be added:

- Le Noyau de Vernon, infusion of cherry pits and almonds mixed with kirsch brandy. A distillery, bearing the name of this spirit, was created in the nineteenth century in the city of Vernon before disappearing in the 1980s and seeing its production continue by the company Vedrenne.

== See also ==
- List of almond dishes
