= Lillet =

French wine-based aperitif

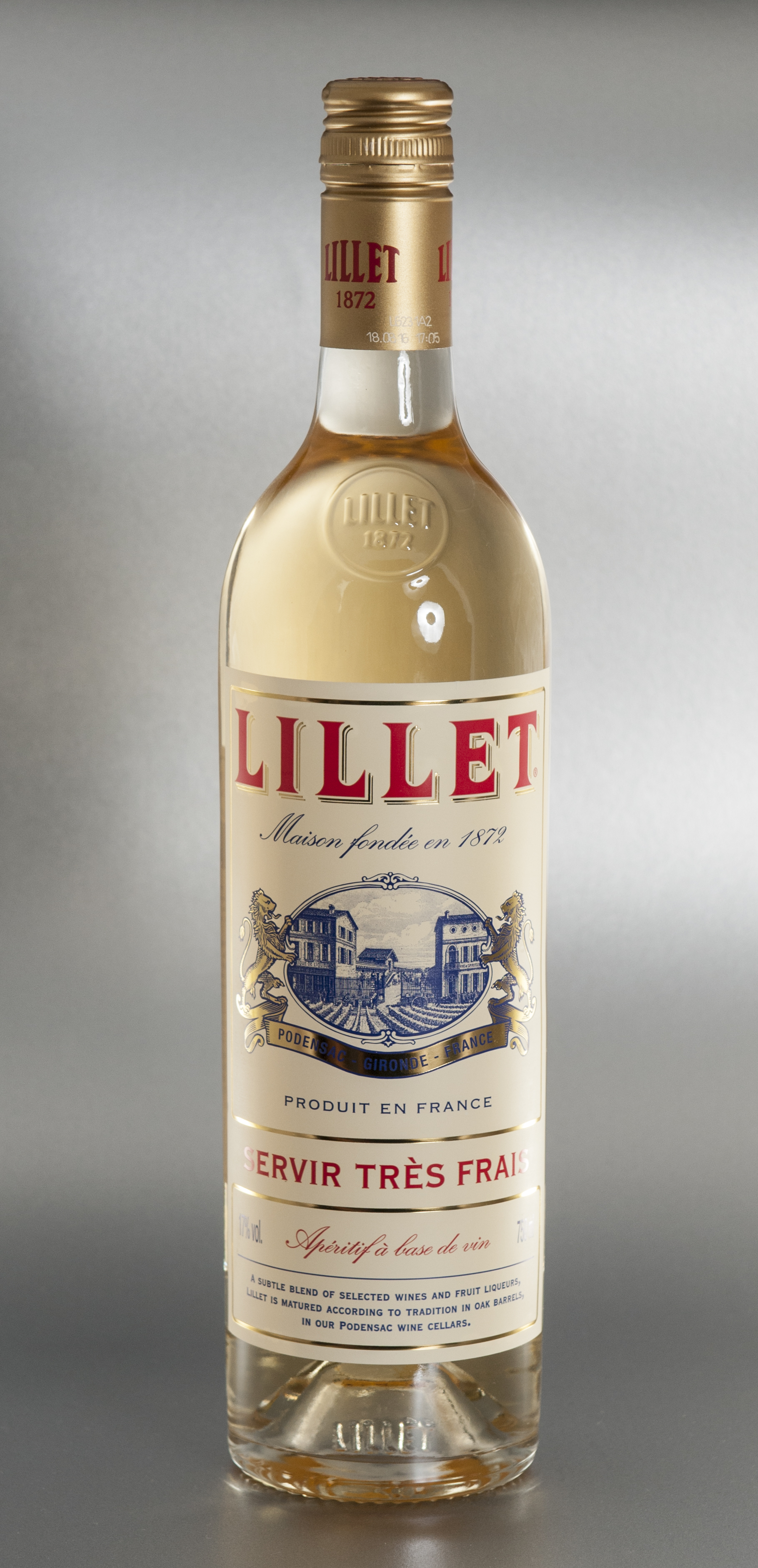
A bottle of Lillet

Lillet logo

Lillet (French pronunciation: [lilɛ]) is a French wine-based aperitif from Podensac, Gironde. Classed as an aromatised wine within EU law, it is a blend of 85% Bordeaux region wines (Semillon for the blanc and for the rosé, Merlot for the rouge) and 15% macerated liqueurs, mostly citrus liqueurs (peels of sweet oranges from Spain and Morocco and peels of bitter green oranges from Haiti). The mix is then stirred in oak vats until blended with French brandy. During the aging process, Lillet is handled as a Bordeaux wine (undergoing fining, racking, filtering, etc.).

In the original Kina Lillet formulation (so named with respect to its status as a quinquina), quinine liqueur made of cinchona bark from Peru was included among its ingredients. "Lillet" belongs to a family of aperitifs known as tonic wines because of the addition of quinine.

== Varieties ==
- Kina Lillet (1887–1986): A liqueur made with white wine mixed with fruit liqueurs and flavored with quinine. The "Kina" in its name is derived from quinine's main ingredient: the bark of the kina-kina (or cinchona) tree.
- Lillet Dry (1920–?): A drier formula created for the British market. Some consider it the Kina Lillet mentioned by Ian Fleming's character James Bond when he created the Vesper Martini.
- Lillet Rouge (1962–present): A red-wine-based liqueur first suggested by the American wine merchant and importer Michael Dreyfus, one of the first to import Lillet into the US
- Lillet Blanc (1986–present): A sweeter variant of the white-wine-based version with reduced quinine content. It replaced Kina Lillet.
- Lillet Rosé (2011–present): A rosé-wine-based liqueur.

== History ==
In 1872, the brothers Paul and Raymond Lillet, distillers and merchants of wines and spirits, founded their company La Maison Lillet in Podensac, south of Bordeaux, France. The idea of making aperitifs in Bordeaux came from Father Kermann, a doctor who left Brazil at the beginning of Louis XVI's reign. He returned to France and made Bordeaux his home, where he created liqueurs and fortifiers using herbs like quinine. During that time, Bordeaux became one of the most important places for the European wine business. It was also France's main harbour for products imported from the Caribbean islands.

At the end of the 19th century, people developed a great fear of illness as a consequence of the discoveries made by Louis Pasteur (1822–1895). Nevertheless, "Wine", Pasteur said, "can be considered with good reason as the most healthful and the most hygienic of all beverages". As a result, tonic wines (with quinine) became very popular as quinine was used to fight fevers and ease malaria symptoms.

In 1887, Paul and Raymond Lillet created Kina Lillet. Originally blanc, when all other aperitifs were red, Lillet was the only aperitif from a specific geographic location, one of the most famous, the Bordeaux region, or more precisely Great Sauternes region (at that time Sauternes was covering appellations that are now considered as Bordeaux or Graves appellation).

During the 1920s, Lillet exports greatly increased in Europe and Africa. The brand also became famous in France, thanks to advertising campaigns. At the same time, Lillet was served on transatlantic liners, part of the reason for its success with high society in New York. American bartenders used it for making fashionable cocktails.

In 1962, Pierre Lillet, grandson of Raymond, keen to capitalize on America's growing taste for red wine, created Lillet Rouge for the American market.

In the early part of the 1970s, Maison Lillet removed "Kina" from the brand name calling it simply Lillet. "Kina" had become a generic term used by many aperitifs to emphasise their quinine content, and was no longer relevant for the times. Lillet is the name of the family, and became the only name of the brand.

To improve the quality and sustainability of the Lillet recipe, in 1985, Lillet was reformulated, after close work with the Bordeaux University's Institute of Oenology, applying modern oenology. Both the quinine bitterness and corresponding sweetness were reduced.

In 2011, under cellarmaster Jean Bernard Blancheton, rosé Lillet version was introduced.

== Advertising and arts ==
- 1896: First Lillet advertising iron plates
- 1903: First Lillet illustrated poster created by Raymond Lillet
- 1906: Second Lillet illustrated poster designed by Georges Dol
- 1909: Lillet launch on transatlantic liners, with the claim: "Kina-Lillet & Sauternes Lillet can be obtained on all steamers of the Cie Transatlantique. It should always be served iced"
- 1924–1935: "Kina-Lillet, 11 Grand Prizes" and "Ask for a Lilet" promotional campaigns run on public transport. These used the spelling "Demandez un Lilet" to signal the correct pronunciation
- 1925–1935: Advertising campaigns promoting football, basketball and rugby games by André Galland
- 1930s Harry Craddock appeared in Lillet ads in a UK trade magazine.
- 1930: Mural ads along streets
- 1937: French artist Robert Wolf's design brings Lillet to a wider audience.
- 1940–1951: Alcohol ads are banned during and after the Second World War.
- 1950–51: Participation in trade exhibitions in Bordeaux, Toulouse, Nantes, Quimper and Clermont-Ferrand
- 1967: Roger Seguin designed an advertising poster for Lillet (blue background)
- 2008: Posters designed by Stina Persson
- 2012: Sara Singh illustrations for Lillet
- 2014: Lillet Paris rooftop scene photography by Pauline Daniel

== Serving Lillet ==
Lillet is an aperitif wine, intended to be served well chilled at 6–8 °C (43–46 °F). In France, Lillet is usually served on ice with a slice of orange, or a lemon or lime peel. In Germany, Austria and Switzerland Lillet blanc is more often served as a Lillet Vive, a Lillet blanc long drink. A Lillet Vive is 5cl Lillet blanc, 10cl tonic water, a slice of cucumber, a strawberry and mint leaves.

In other countries, especially in the US and UK, it is more often used as a cocktail ingredient. The best known Lillet cocktails are the Vesper, the Corpse Reviver #2, the 20th Century and the Old Etonian. Recipes appear in cocktail books including The Bartender's Bible by Gary Regan, the Savoy Cocktail Book by Harry Craddock and the Complete World Bartender Guide by Bob Sennett. In the 1930s the Savoy Cocktail Book published 22 Lillet cocktails recipes (46 Cointreau, 24 Dubonnet, 24 Chartreuse and 10 Grand Marnier, by comparison).

A Lillet spritz is a two-ingredient cocktail in which white or rosé Lillet is mixed with sparkling water and a garnish such as mint, berries, cranberries, or thyme sprigs. In the United States, a booklet titled "The Lillet Book of Apertif Cocktails" was distributed with bottles of Lillet. It included a recipe which described a "Lillet Spritz" as "3 parts Lillet Blanc or Lillet Rose and 3 parts tonic water. Build over 3 large ice cubes in a tall wine glass and garnish with cucumber, mint and strawberry."

== Appearances in popular culture ==
- 1950s: Wallis, Duchess of Windsor, the American spouse of King Edward VIII, was a great admirer of Lillet. She introduced it to high society, particularly at Fauchon, and into the upper-class hotels where she stayed frequently.
- 1953: in the first Ian Fleming James Bond novel Casino Royale, Bond invents a Kina Lillet martini, which he named the "Vesper" after his love interest in the story:

"A dry martini," he said. "One. In a deep champagne goblet." "Oui, Monsieur." "Just a moment. Three measures of Gordon's, one of vodka, half a measure of Kina Lillet. Shake it very well until it's ice-cold, then add a large thin slice of lemon-peel. Got it?" "Certainly, monsieur." The barman seemed pleased with the idea.

The Vesper was prepared for James Bond in the films Casino Royale (2006) and Quantum of Solace (2008).

- 1981: Lillet is the preferred drink of serial killer Hannibal Lecter in the series of books written by Thomas Harris.
- 2018: Lillet is featured in Dan Fesperman novel Safe Houses.
- 2022: Lillet is featured in the German-language track "Wildberry Lillet" by Nina Chuba.
