= Harry Craddock =

English bartender (1876–1963)

Harry Craddock (29 August 1876 – 25 January 1963) was an English bartender who became one of the most famous bartenders of the 1920s and 1930s. He is known for his tenure at the Savoy Hotel in London, and for his 1930 book, The Savoy Cocktail Book.

== Life and career ==
Born in Stroud, Gloucestershire, Craddock moved to the United States in 1897, where he worked at Cleveland's Hollenden Hotel and New York's Knickerbocker Hotel and Hoffman House, becoming a United States citizen. He left America during Prohibition and sailed to Liverpool with his wife and daughter before joining the American Bar at the Savoy Hotel, London, in 1920.

Craddock's The Savoy Cocktail Book, a collection of 750 cocktails, was first published in 1930 and is still in print today. He is sometimes credited with creating a number of classic cocktails, including the famous Corpse Reviver #2 and White Lady.

While at the Savoy, Craddock co-founded the United Kingdom Bartenders' Guild in 1934. In 1938, he moved to the Dorchester Hotel and then to Brown's Hotel in Mayfair, retiring in 1947. He died in 1963 and was buried in a pauper's grave.

== See also ==
- Pegu club (cocktail)

== Sources ==
- Williams, Olivia (2014). Gin Glorious Gin:How Mother's Ruin Became the Spirit of London. London: Headline Publishing Group. ISBN 978-1-4722-1534-5.
