= Bulevardi =

Street in Helsinki, Finland

Coordinates: 60.1647°N 24.9382°E

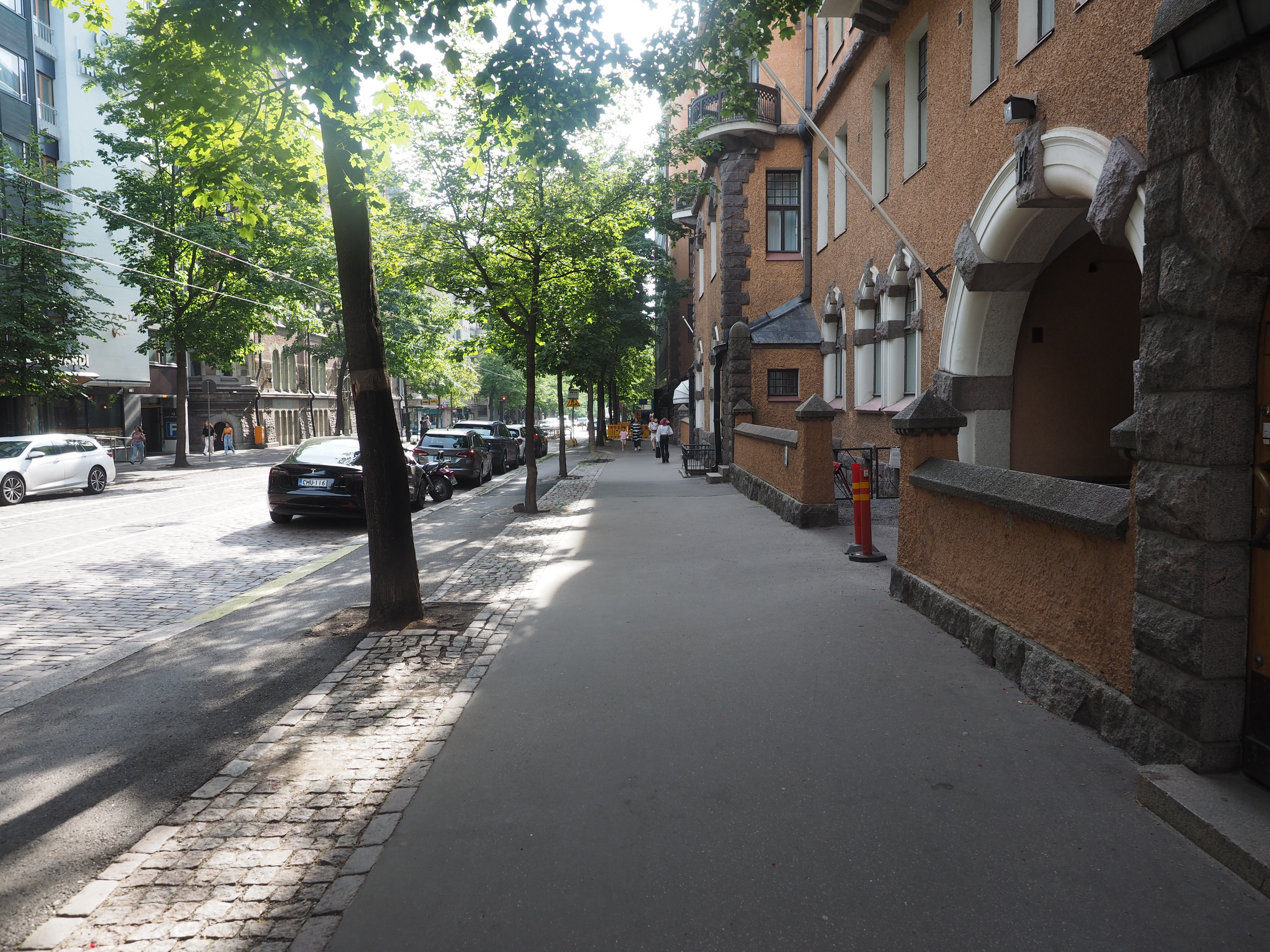
Bulevardi in August 2020.

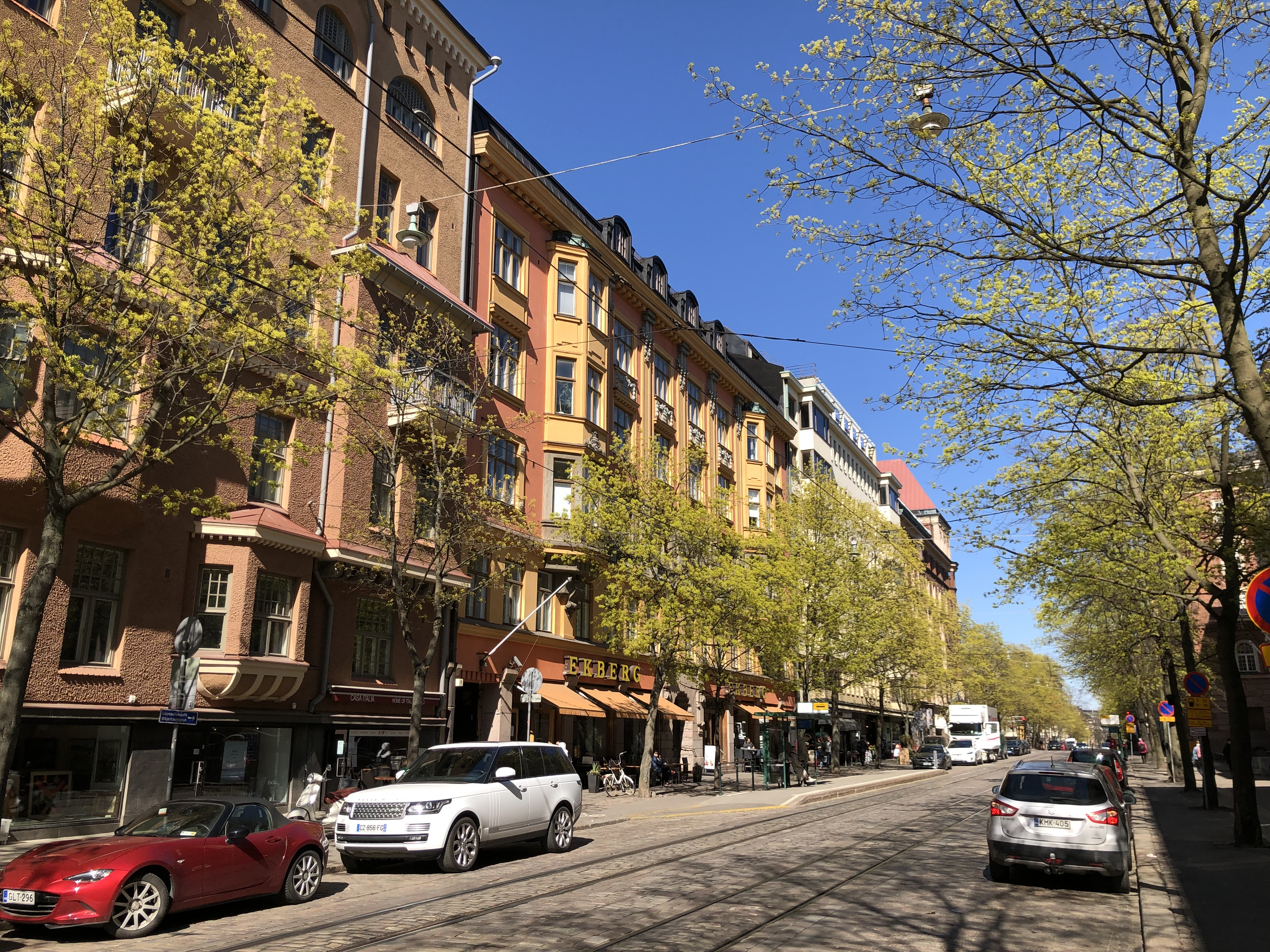
Bulevardi in 2019. In the middle is the famous Café Ekberg.

Bulevardi (Swedish: Bulevarden, Boulevard) is a boulevard in Helsinki, Finland. It starts at Erottaja and ends at Hietalahdentori. The majority of the boulevard is located in the western part of the Kamppi neighborhood and a small part of Punavuori. Restaurants, cafes, and art galleries line the street. The Alexander Theatre and Sinebrychoff Museum of Art are located on Bulevardi.

Bulevardi is part of a culturally and historically significant avenue axis continuing via Erottaja and the Esplanadi park to the Market Square. The trees on the street mostly consist of old linden and younger maple trees. The street has been designated as a nationally significant urban environment, surrounded by architecturally valuable buildings.

== History ==
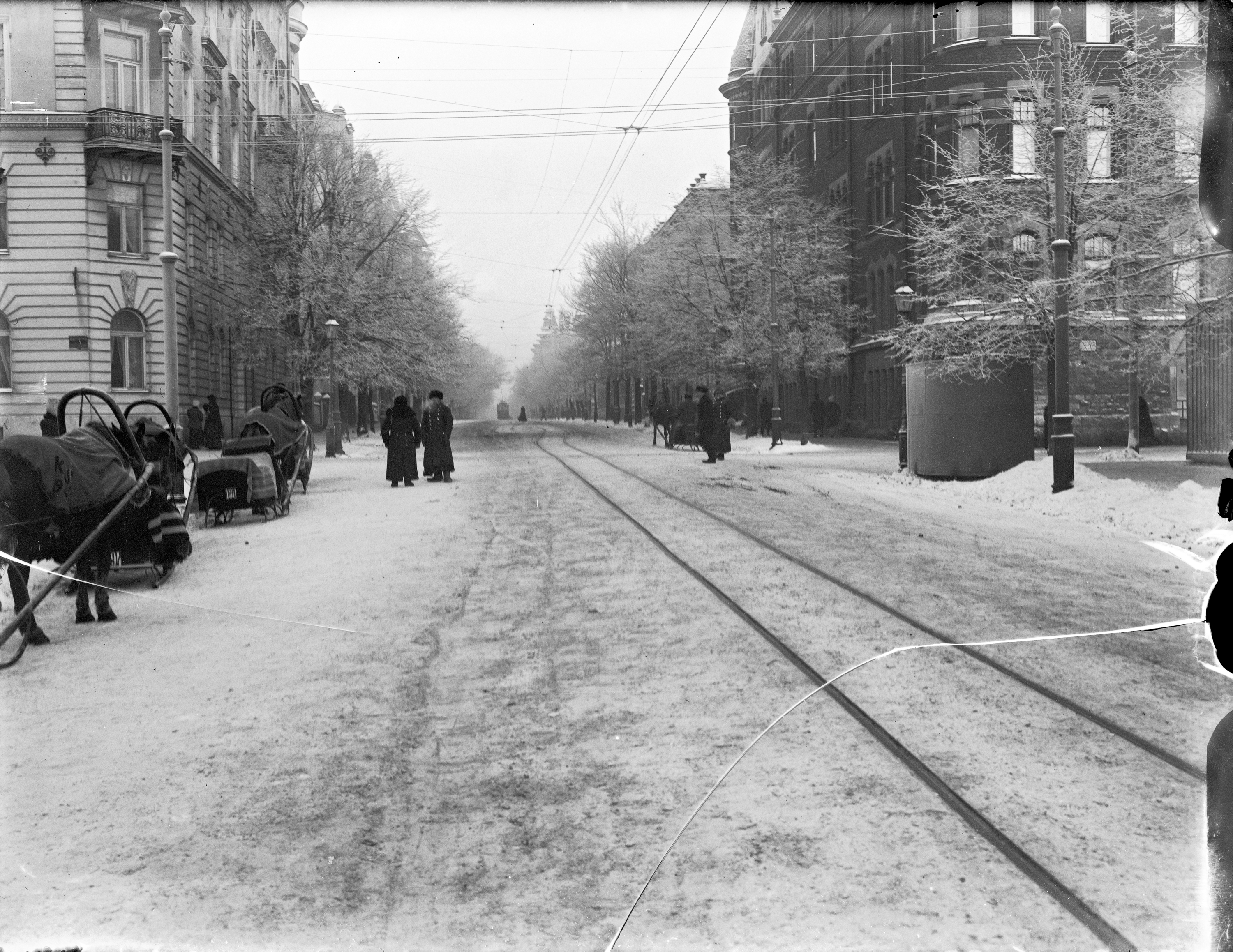
Bulevardi in the early 20th century.

Bulevardi was founded in the 19th century to ease the traffic between Hietalahti and the South Harbour. It was named after existing boulevards in other countries. The street was first named Boulevarden in 1820, and its first Finnish names were Lehtokatu and Pulewardinkatu in 1866. The Swedish name was Boulevardsgatan since the 1870s and the Finnish name Boulevardinkatu was taken into use during the following decade. The names of the street were established as Boulevardsgatan and Bulevardinkatu in 1909, with the latter coming into use in the 1890s. The current names were established in 1928.

The first houses on Bulevardi were built in the early 1820s. The street soon gained a reputation of a residence area for "the better people". The architect Carl Ludvig Engel bought two lots on the street, erected his house of residence there and founded a garden. In the 1870s old wooden houses were dismantled and replaced with apartment buildings. In the 20th century many apartments were converted into offices.

== Traffic ==
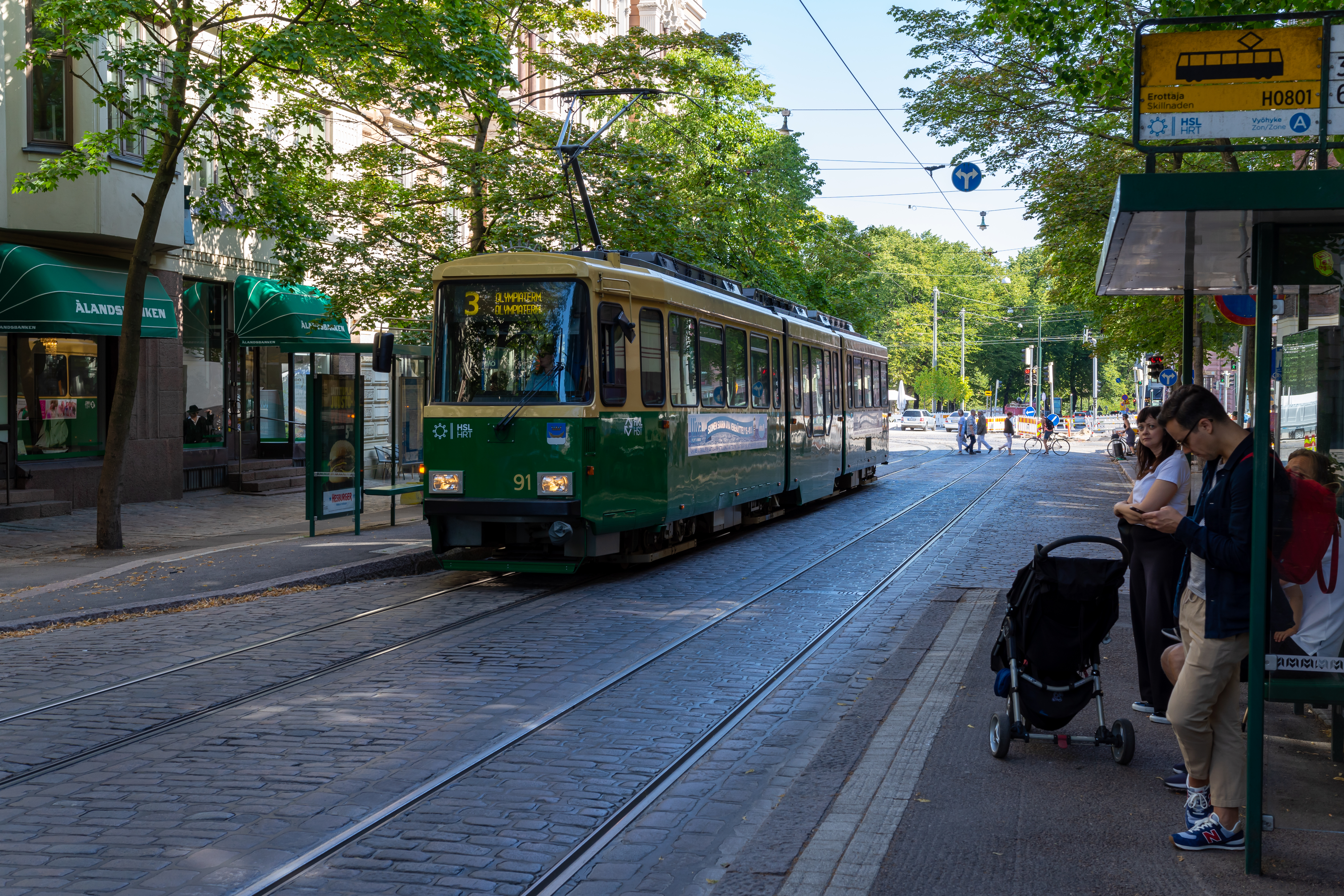
A Valmet Nr II tram on Bulevardi in summer 2019.

The motor traffic part of the street is paved with a nearly perfectly preserved Belgian block pavement from the late 19th and early 20th centuries. The sidewalks and cycling routes are mostly paved with asphalt. The Helsinki tram lines 1 and 3 travel on Bulevardi from Fredrikinkatu to Erottaja, as well as the line 6 from Eiranranta to Erottaja. The bus line 22 travels on Bulevardi from Fredrikinkatu to Katajaharju in Lauttasaari.

Personal car traffic on Bulevardi was forbidden from 1973 to 1989, when the street was part of a transit mall experiment. Personal car traffic was allowed again when it turned out that the police did not have enough resources to enforce the ban. Increased car traffic and noise on Uudenmaankatu was also a problem. Since 1989 it has not been possible to drive from Bulevardi straight to Eteläesplanadi street.

== Intersecting streets from east to west ==
- Yrjönkatu
- Annankatu
- Fredrikinkatu (one-way traffic, excluding bicycle and tram traffic to the south)
- Albertinkatu (one-way traffic from the north)
- Sinebrychoffinkatu (to the south, a dead-end street)
- Abrahaminkatu

== Parks and significant buildings from east to west ==
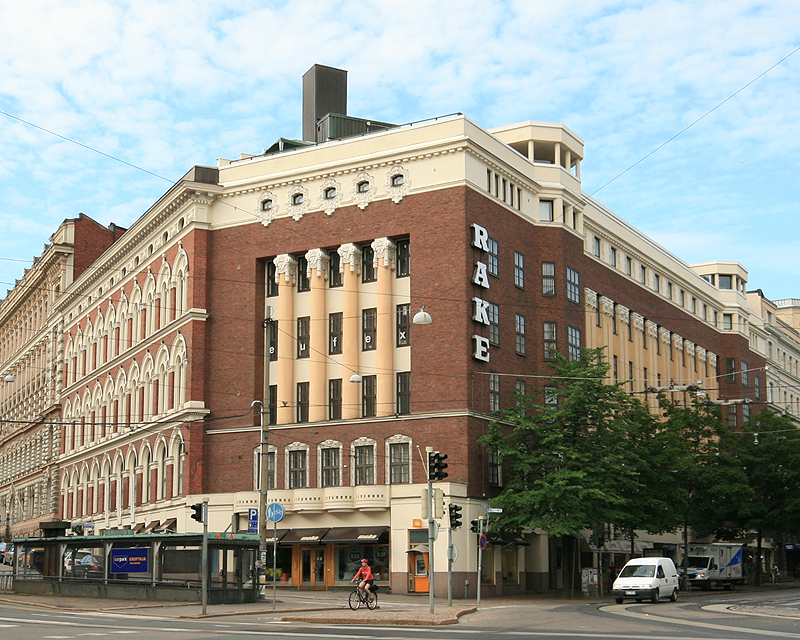
The house at the corner of Bulevardi and Erottajankatu (Bulevardi 2–4), serving as the premises of the hotel Klaus K.

There are many historically significant buildings and parks on Bulevardi. The buildings on the eastern end of the street, save for a couple of exceptions, are about a century old. To the west of Fredrikinkatu these are joined with functionalist apartment buildings and a few office buildings built after the wars, of which one was built in the place of a building destroyed in the bombing of Helsinki. The Old Church Park is located to the north of Bulevardi between Annankatu and Yrjönkatu, and opposite the park at Bulevardi 8 is the former building of the Helsinki Finnish School for Girls. There are premises of the University of Helsinki to the south of Bulevardi west from Annankatu.

The Alexander Theatre is located to the north of the intersection of Albertinkatu and Bulevardi, to the west of which are premises of the Metropolia University of Applied Sciences in the former building of the Helsinki University of Technology to the east of Hietalahdentori. To the south of the street, west of Sinebrychoffinkatu is the Sinebrychoff Art Museum in a two-floor building and even further west are old factory buildings of the Sinebrychoff brewery, currently converted into office buildings. Both sides of the Sinebrychoff Art Museum provide access to the Sinebrychoff Park.
