= Finnish National Gallery =

Art museum institution of Finland

Coordinates: 60.1717°N 24.9369°E

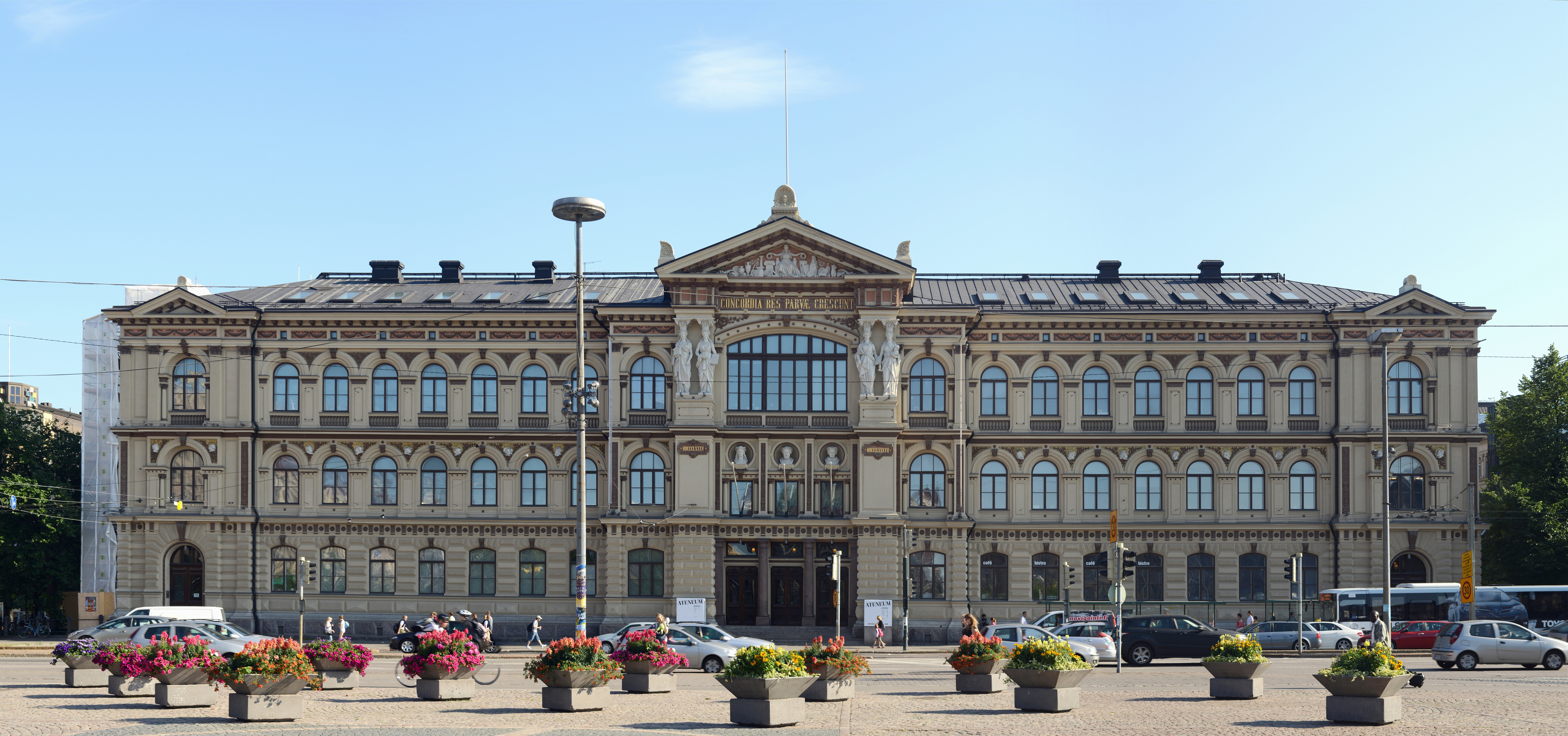
- Formation: 2014
- Established: January 27, 1846
- Founder: Finnish Art Society
- Type: Art museum institution
- Headquarters: Helsinki, Finland
- Website: Official Website

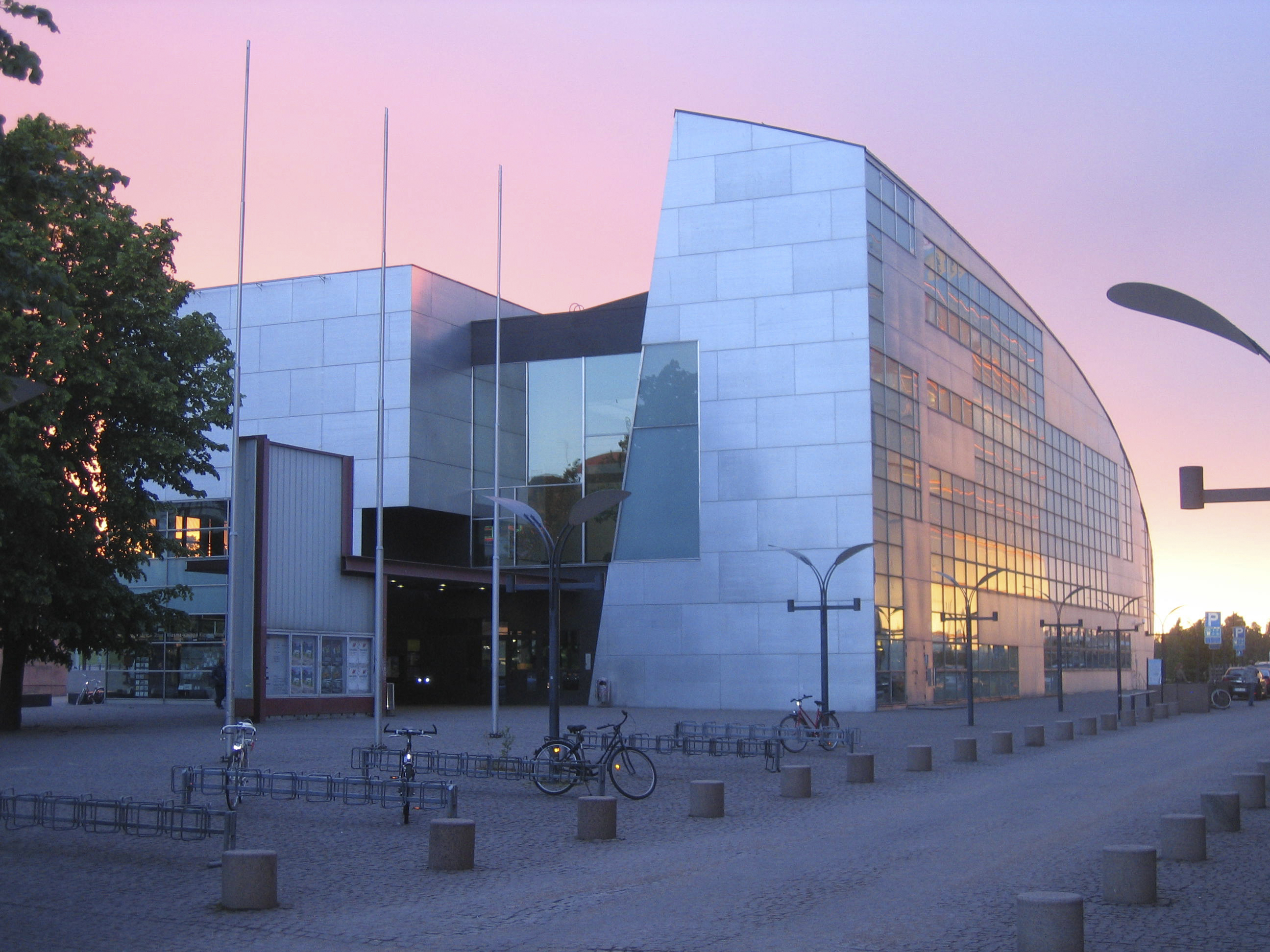
The Kiasma museum of contemporary art in Helsinki, another part of the Finnish National Gallery

Finnish National Gallery (Finnish: Suomen Kansallisgalleria, Swedish: Finlands Nationalgalleri) is the largest art museum institution of Finland. It consists of the Ateneum, an art museum; Kiasma, a contemporary art museum; and the Sinebrychoff Art Museum, a historic house and art museum.

The organization's functions are supported by the conservation department, the administration and services department and Kehys, the art museum development department.

== History ==
On January 27, 1846, the Finnish Art Society was established. In 1848, it established the Helsinki Drawing School and in 1852, the organization took over Turku Drawing School.

In the 19th century, the organization's collections grew through donations. In 1893, Victor Hoving, Herman Antell, and Karl Emanuel Jannsson made significant contributions to the organization.

The Ateneum building was completed in the spring of 1887 and the Finnish Art Society's operations were moved there. In 1921, Paul and Fanny Sinebrychoff donated approximately 900 works to the Society, creating the basis of what would become the Sinebrychoff Museum.

In 1939, the Fine Arts Academy of Finland was established. That same year, the Ateneum art collection and Sinebrychoff Museum were closed due to the Winter War. The Ateneum art collection reopened in 1946 and was renamed the Ateneum Art Museum in 1958. The Sinebrychoff Museum reopened in 1960.

In 1990, the Finnish National Gallery was established to manage the collection. That same year, the Museum of Contemporary Art was founded. In 1996, construction of a building for the Museum of Contemporary Art began and in 1998, the Kiasma opened.

In 2014, the Finnish National Gallery reorganized as a public foundation that operates the Ateneum Art Museum, Museum of Contemporary Art Kiasma, and Sinebrychoff Art Museum as museum units.

== Functions ==
The mission of the Finnish National Gallery is to further the cultural heritage of Finnish visual arts, to enforce the significance of visual culture in contemporary times, and to develop the art museum industry. They also maintain and develop Finland's largest collection of art and the knowledge and research archives of their field.

== Collections ==
The Ateneum is a predominantly Finnish Art Museum with paintings by leading Finnish painters like Albert Edelfelt, Eero Järnefelt, Helene Schjerfbeck, Pekka Halonen, Hugo Simberg, Akseli Gallen-Kallela, and Fanny Churberg. The Sinebrychoff Art Museum has foreign paintings by painters such as Giovanni Boccati, Giovanni Castiglione, Govaert Flinck, Rembrandt, Jan Cook, Goyen, Carl Wilhelm de Hamilton, Lucas Cranach the Elder, Jurgen Ovens, Frans Wouters, Hieronymous Francken the Second, Joshua Reynolds, Antoine Watteau, François Boucher, Carl von Breda, Alexander Roslin, and Jacob Bjorck. It has an appreciable collection of Swedish miniatures.

== See also ==
- List of national galleries
