= Sinebrychoff Park =

Park in Helsinki, Finland

Coordinates: 60°09′45″N 24°55′57″E

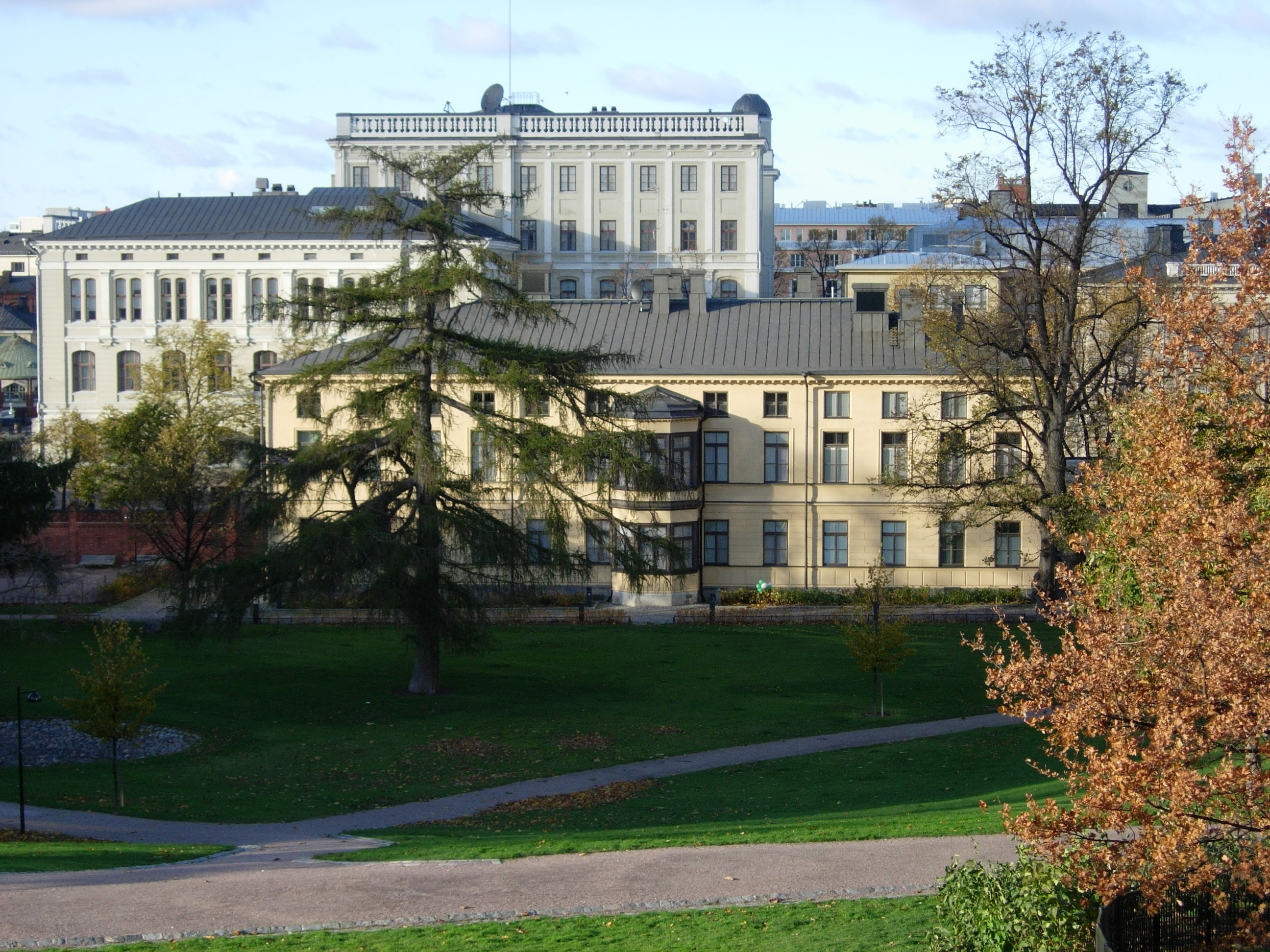
A view of the Sinebrychoff park. In the background is the Sinebrychoff Art Museum building, behind which is the former main building of the Helsinki University of Technology, currently owned by Kojamo.

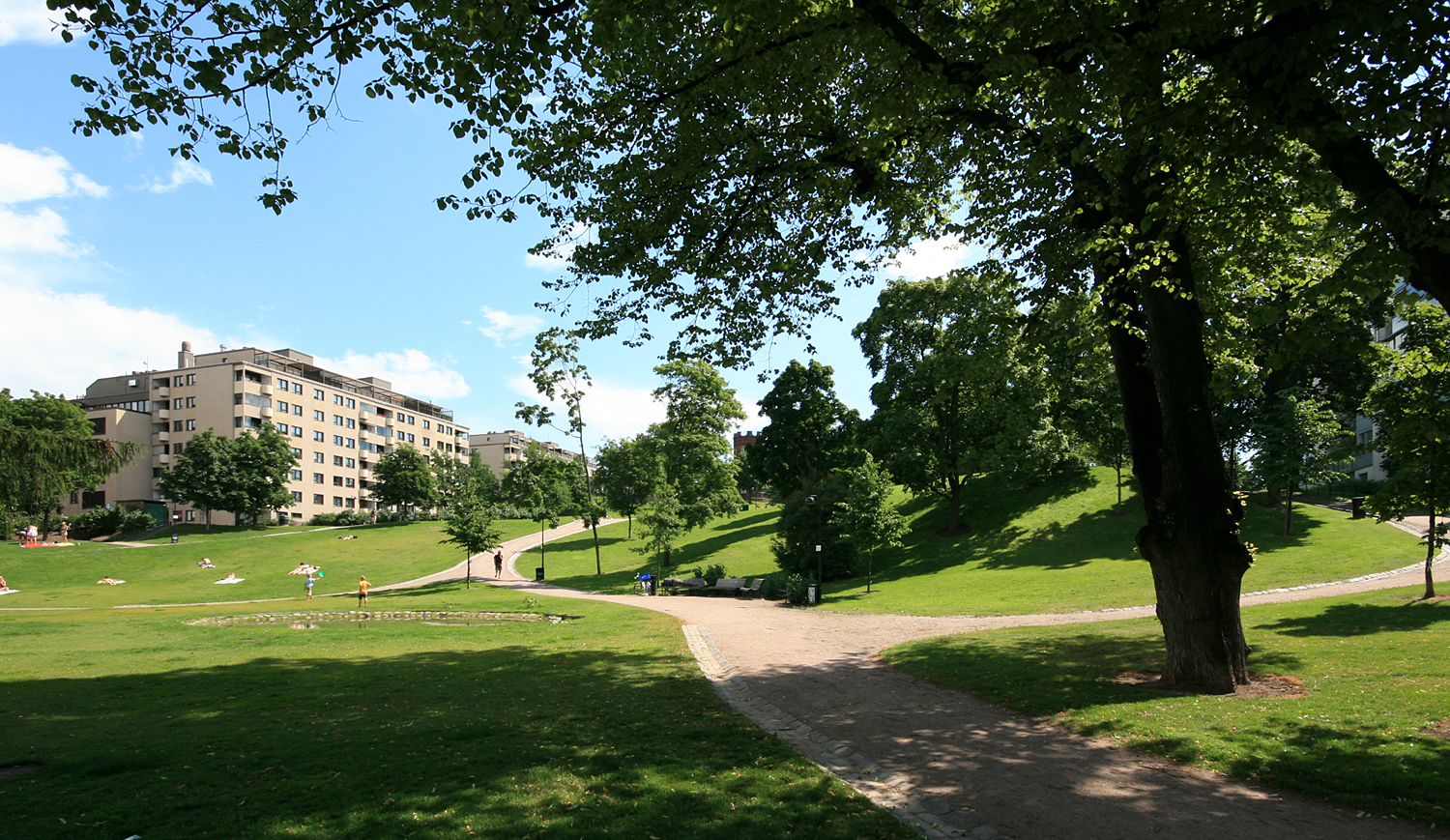
The Sinebrychoff park.

The Sinebrychoff Park (Finnish: Sinebrychoffin puisto, Swedish: Sinebrychoffsparken), colloquially referred to as the "Koff Park", is a park in Punavuori, Helsinki, Finland, near Hietalahti. The park was named after the Sinebrychoff brewery, which had its premises next to the park from 1819 to 1992 and to whose lands the park used to belong, and the Sinebrychoff family that owned both. In addition to the Old Church Park and Kaivopuisto, the park is among the most popular parks in Helsinki.

At the edge of the park, along Bulevardi, is the former Sinebrychoff residence built in the 1840s, which currently houses the Sinebrychoff Art Museum. There is a gate from Bulevardi to the park on both sides of it. On the cliff south of the park there is an old octagonal brick tower. There is also a stairway to the cliff from the end of Iso Roobertinkatu. The Mallaskatu street runs underneath the park in a tunnel, which along with the Uudenmaankatu street starting from there forms a high-traffic driveway from Länsiväylä to central Helsinki.

== History ==
Nikolai Sinebrychoff bought a large area to the south of Hietalahdentori as a lot for the brewery in 1819. The industrial buildings were mostly placed on the Hietalahdenranta side of the lot, and the rest of the area was made into a park. Even though the park was privately owned, it was opened to the public in 1835 and soon became a popular vacation resort for Helsinkians. The park was an English landscape garden. Artists such as Magnus von Wright painted landscapes there.

In the 1930s the Sinebrychoff brewery was planning on selling most of the park as residential lots. There was a zoning plan for the area, which would have only left the Bulevardi side of the park intact.

Before World War II, of these planned residential buildings, only the building block to the northeast of the area, which had previously been an industrial area separated from the park by the new Sinebrychoffinkatu street, was built. Otherwise the old park area stayed intact until the 1960s, but the southern park originally planned as residential lots had been closed for the public and grown full of wild plants.

A new zoning contest was held in the 1960s. According to the winning plan, the remaining park area would have been significantly larger than the one in the unbuilt 1930s plan, but there would have been a 19-floor office skyscraper on the eastern edge of the cliff area. Also the Mallaskatu extension of Uudenmaankatu was decided to extend as a tunnel underneath the park. The tunnel with a concrete roof was built already in 1967, as well as a number of additional buildings for the Sinebrychoff factory and a new residential block to the south of them a few years later, separated from the industrial areas by the Mallaskatu street.

Shrinking the park area and the planned office skyscraper caused huge opposition. In the end, the city made a deal with the building company owning the lot, so that two new residential buildings could be built at the extreme eastern edge of the park, but otherwise the park would remain intact and the building company would receive lots from elsewhere in return. The park area had already been transferred into the ownership of the city, and there were extensive renovation and repair work there in the 1980s.

== Sources ==
- Kaija Ollila, Kirsi Toppari: Puhvelista Punatulkkuun, Helsingin vanhoja kortteleita, pp. 172–173, 214–215, 222–223 and 351. Sanoma Oy, 1998. ISBN 951-9134-69-7.
- Sinebrychoff park, city of Helsinki. Accessed on 26 October 2010.
