= Kiasma =

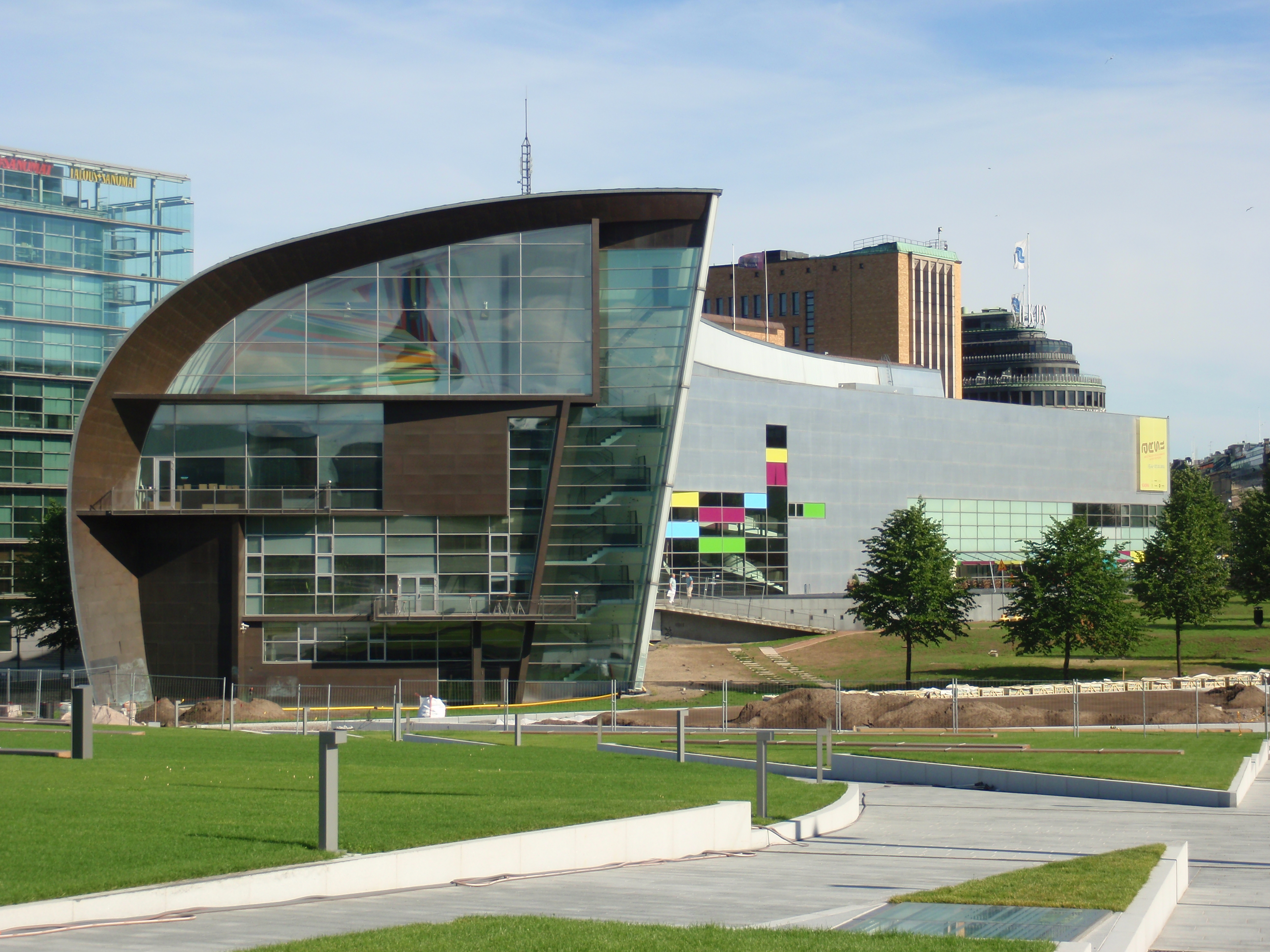
- The northern side of the Kiasma building

- The location of the museum in Helsinki Kiasma (Finland)
- Former name: Museum of Contemporary Art (Finnish: Nykytaiteen museo)
- Established: 1990 (Museum of Contemporary Art); 1998 (opening of Kiasma building)
- Location: Helsinki, Finland
- Coordinates: 60.17169°N 24.93683°E
- Type: Art museum
- Collections: Contemporary art
- Visitors: 295,000 (2017)
- Director: Leevi Haapala
- Owner: Finnish National Gallery
- Website: www.kiasma.fi/en/

Kiasma is a contemporary art museum located on Mannerheimintie in Helsinki, Finland. Its name kiasma, Finnish for chiasma, alludes to the basic conceptual idea of its architect, Steven Holl. Kiasma is part of the Finnish National Gallery, and it is responsible for the gallery's contemporary art collection. Its mission is to showcase contemporary art and celebrate the art of our time.

== History ==
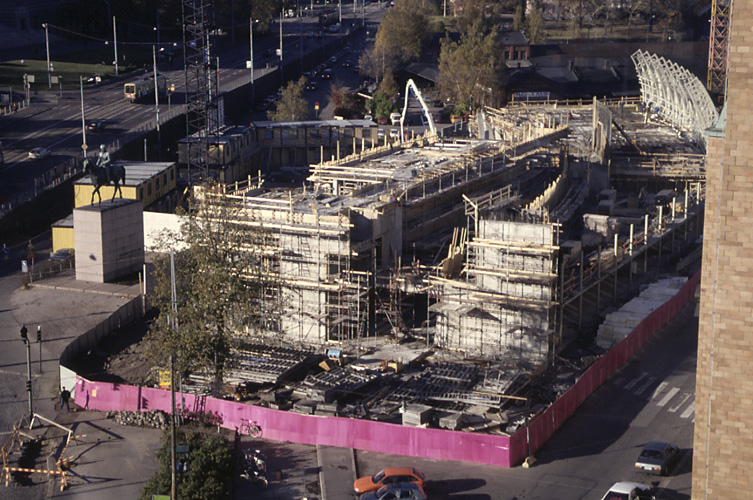
Under construction in Autumn 1996

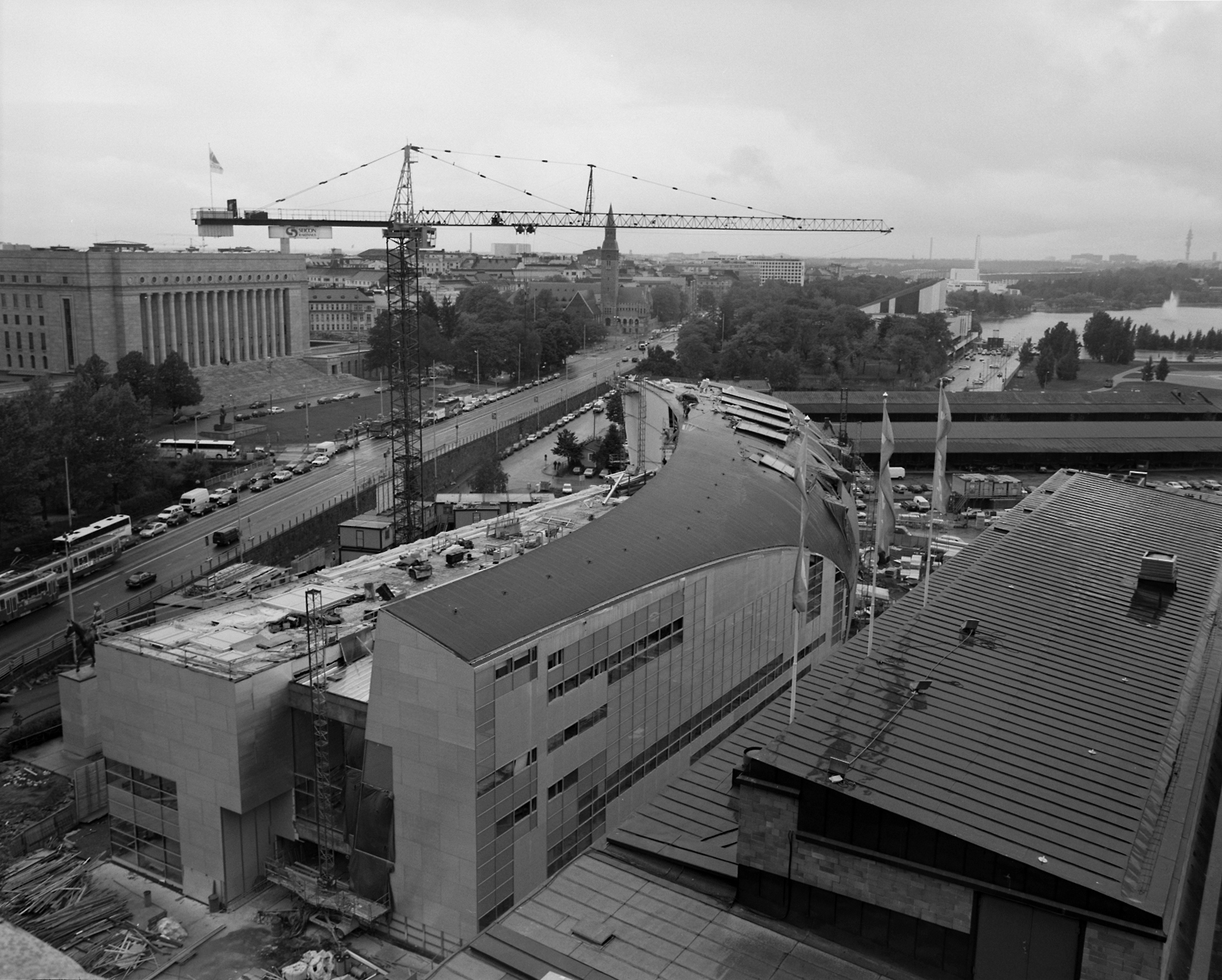
Nearly complete in Autumn 1997, with the now-demolished VR warehouses on the northern side

The contemporary art collection began as the Museum of Contemporary Art (Finnish: Nykytaiteen museo) in 1990. In its earliest stages, the collection was housed in Ateneum.

An architectural design competition to design a building for the contemporary arts museum was held in 1992. The competition was open to architects from the Nordic and Baltic countries, in addition to which four architects or studios from elsewhere were invited to participate, though they were obliged to submit their proposals anonymously: Steven Holl from the US, Alvaro Siza from Portugal, Coop Himmelb(l)au from Austria, and Kazuo Shinohara from Japan. The competition results were announced in 1993, and the winning proposal, titled Chiasma by Steven Holl, was selected from the 516 submitted entries. The design of the building, Finnish-ized as "Kiasma", underwent slight modification during the design process, but nevertheless was regarded as controversial; for instance its close proximity to the equestrian statue of Finnish President Carl Gustaf Emil Mannerheim. Construction work began in 1996, and the museum opened in May 1998.

The museum attracted 160,000–180,000 visitors per year in 2011–2013.

Kiasma was closed for repairs in September 2014 and reopened in March 2015. In 2016, Kiasma attracted over 310,000 visitors.

== Collections ==
The collections include works by around 8,000 artists, including Reetta Ahonen, Martti Aiha, Jan van Andersson Aken, Anders Gustaf, Antonio Rotta, Bernard Baron, Stig Baumgartner, Cornelis Pietersz Bega, Erik Snedsbøl, Nicolas Berchem, Honoré Daumier, Karel Dujardin, Nunzio Gulino, Torger Enckell, Aarne Jämsä, Ismo Kajander, Raimo Kanerva, Søren Dahlgaard and Risto Laakkonen.

== Gallery ==
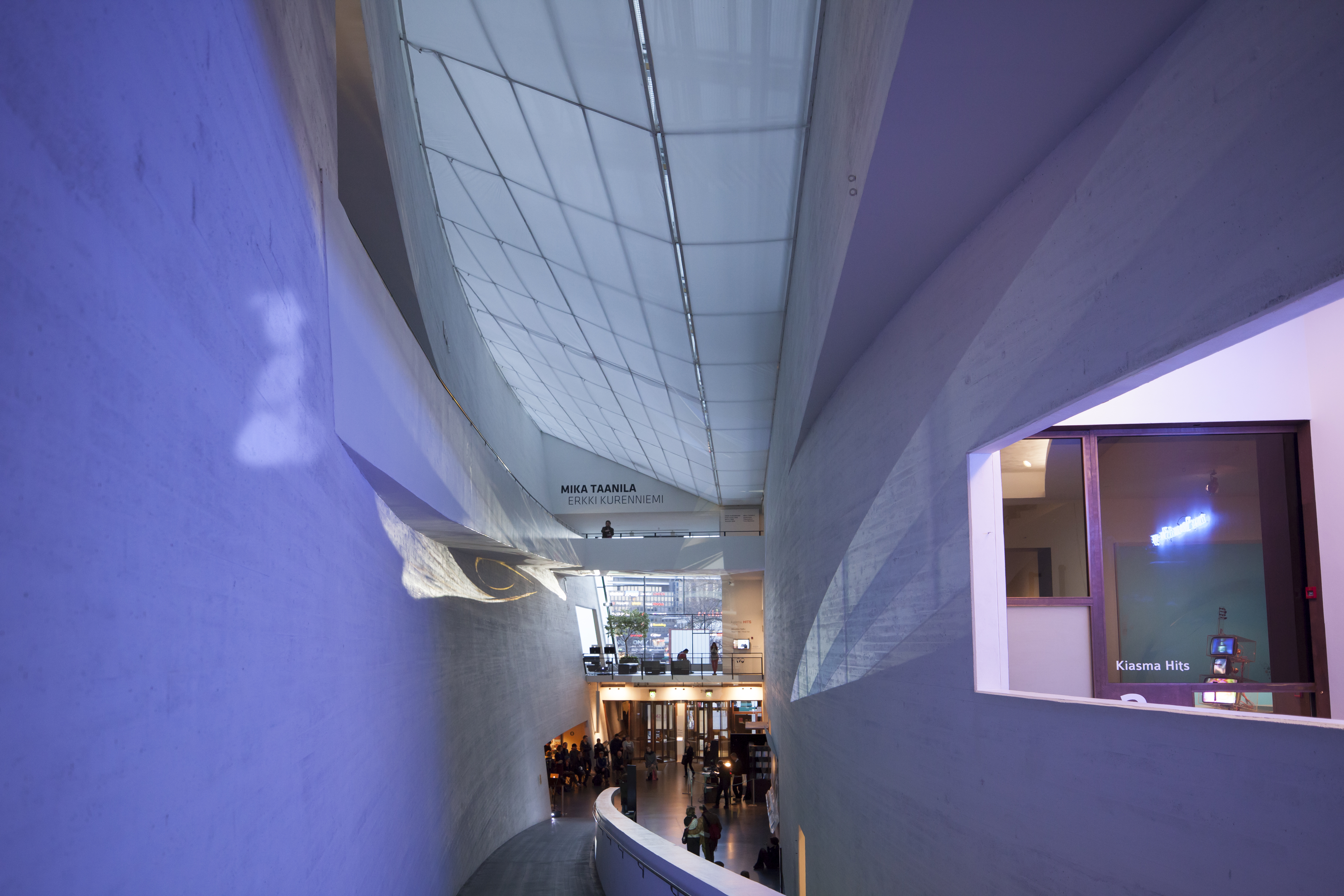
Front lobby

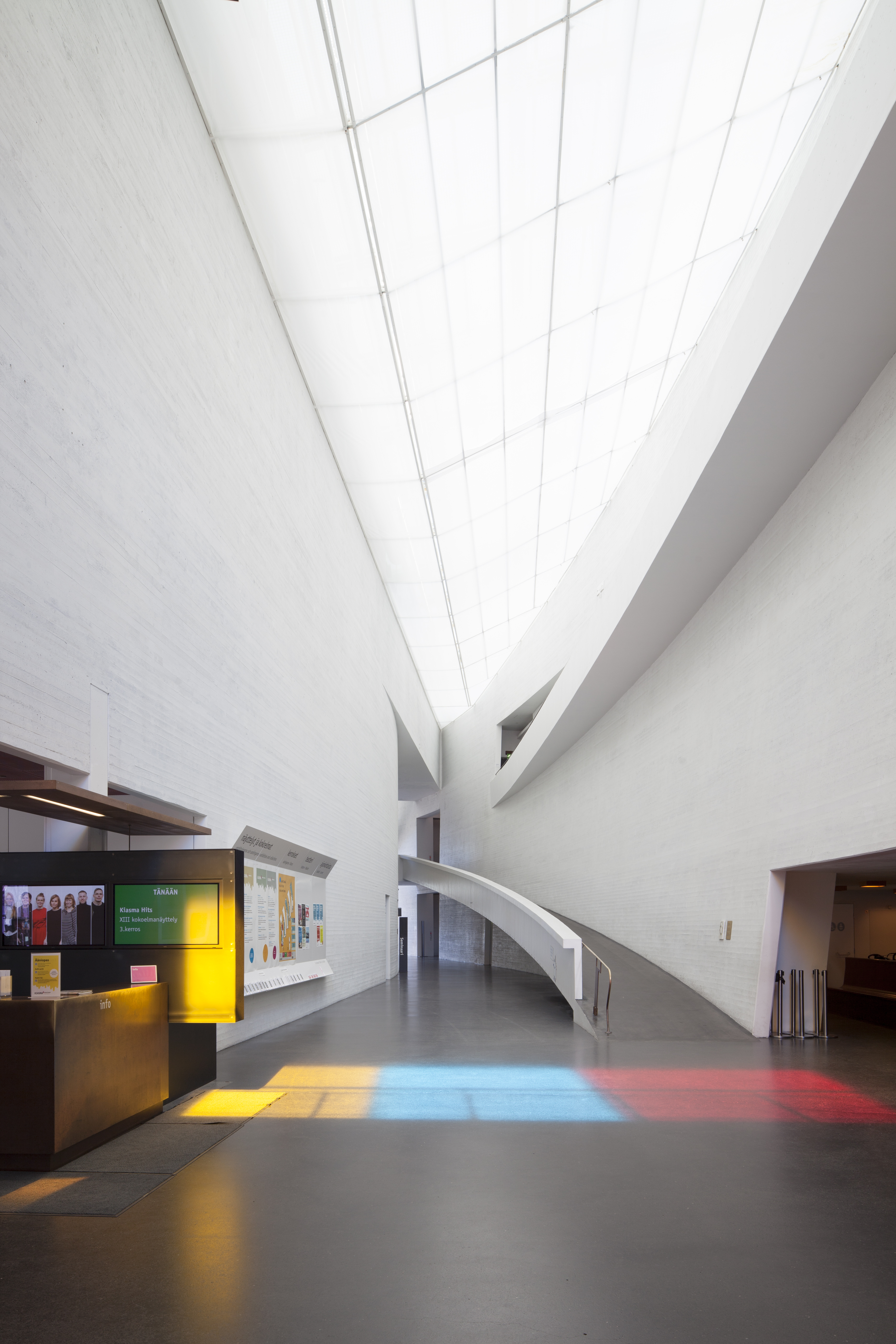
Front lobby, view from the entrance

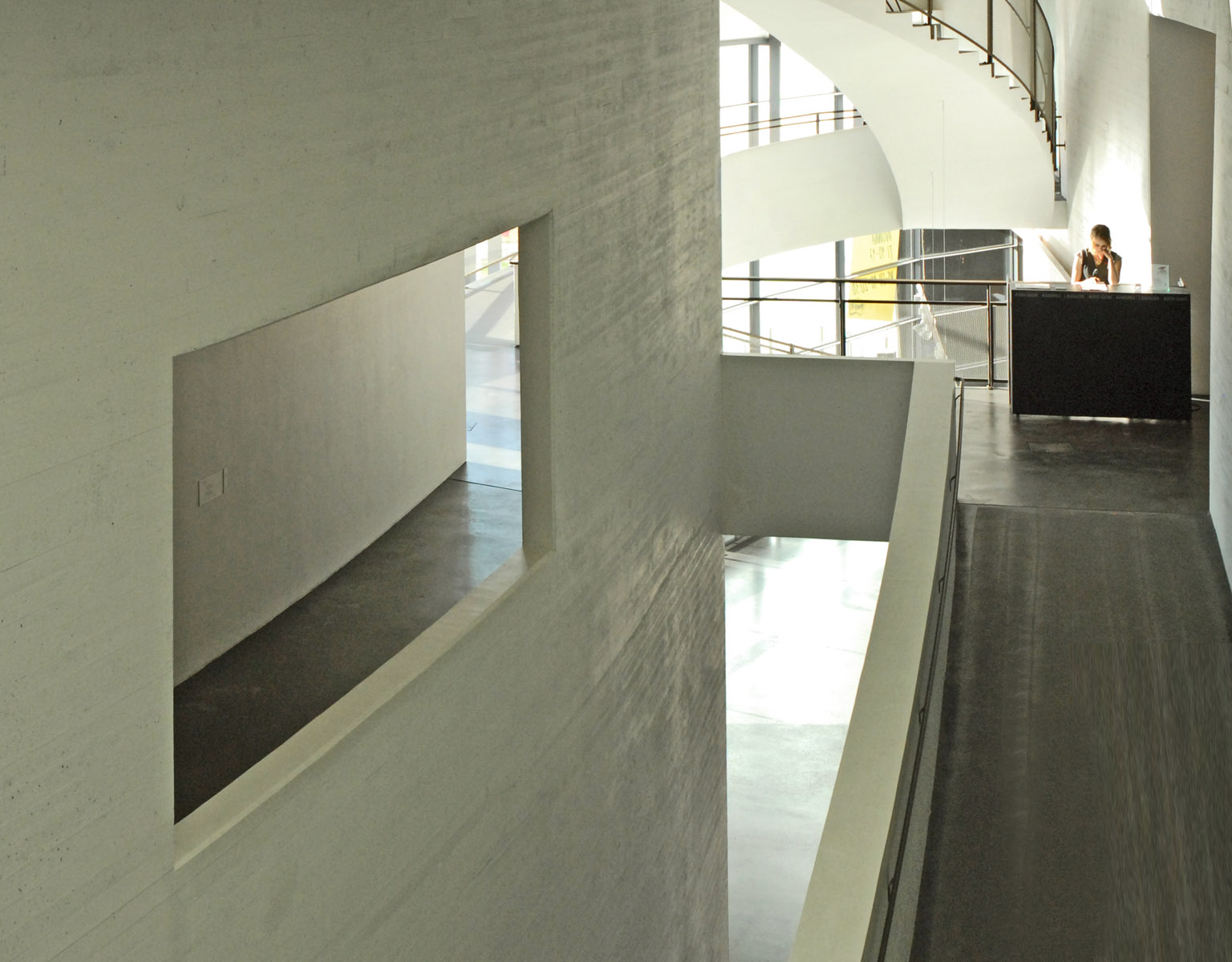
Interior and staircase

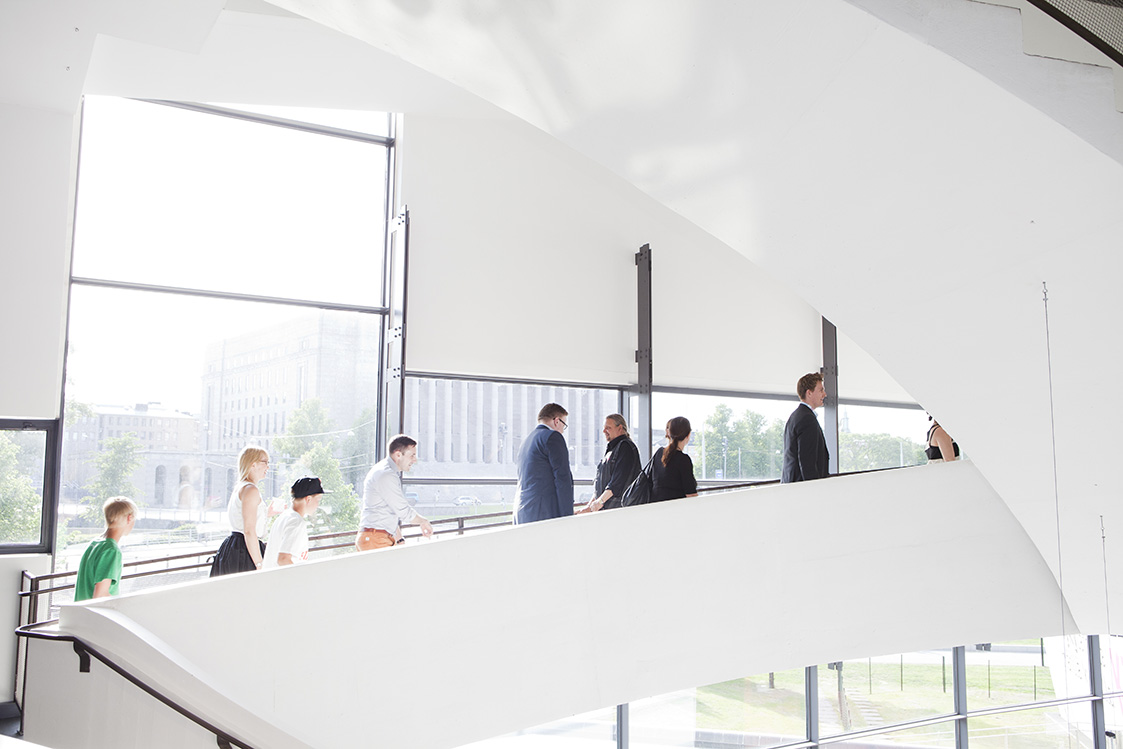
Staircase, with a view of the Parliament House

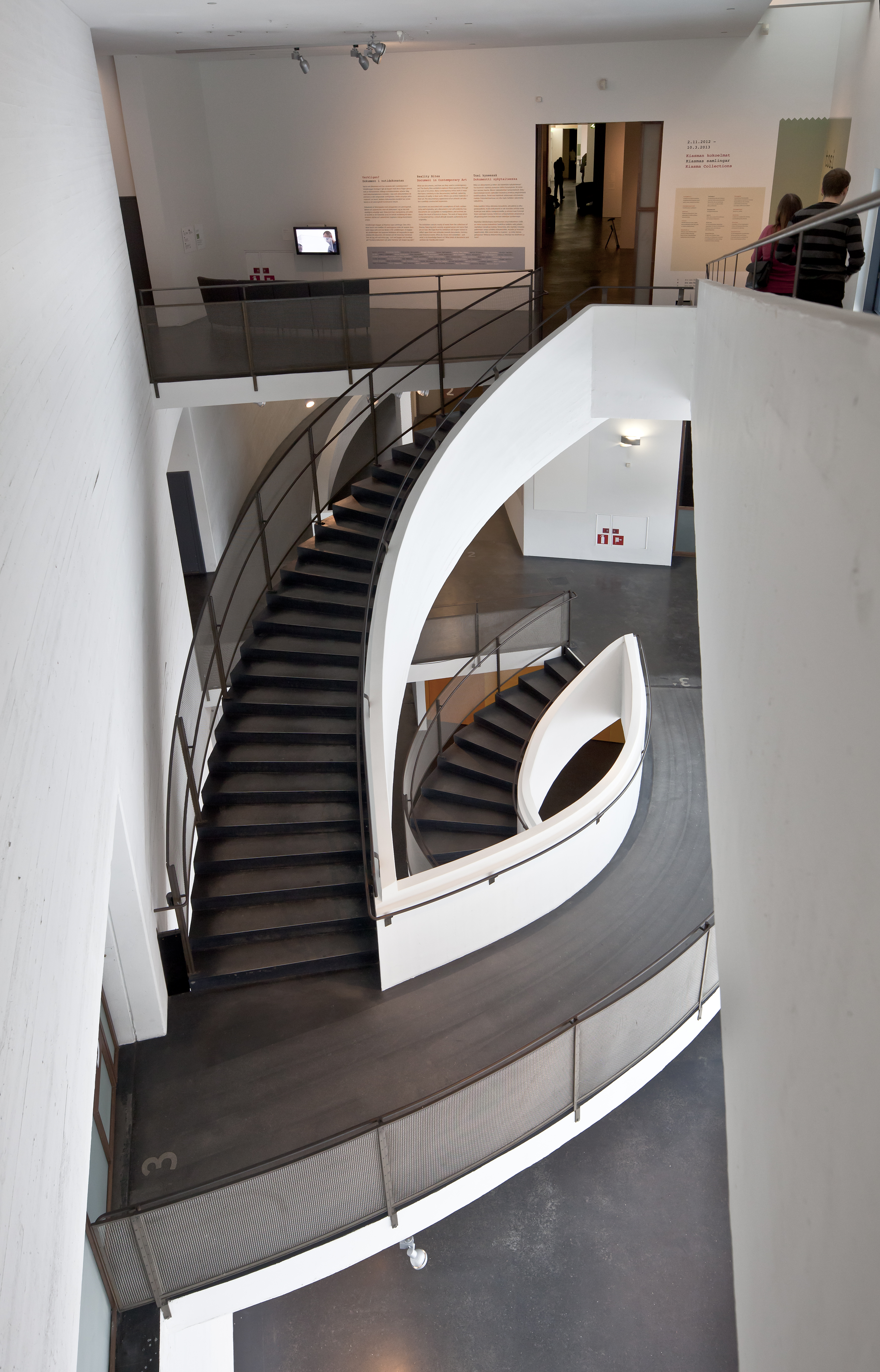
Stairs seen from 5th floor

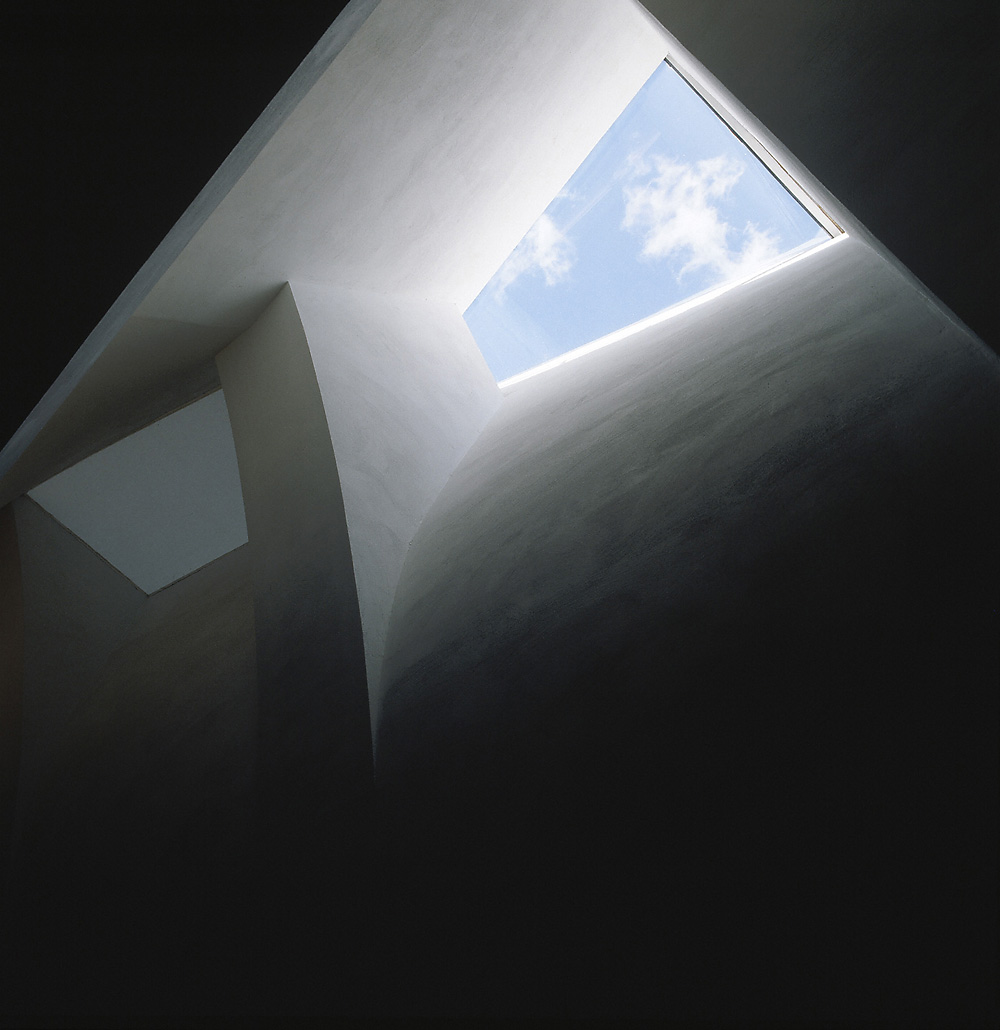
Natural lighting

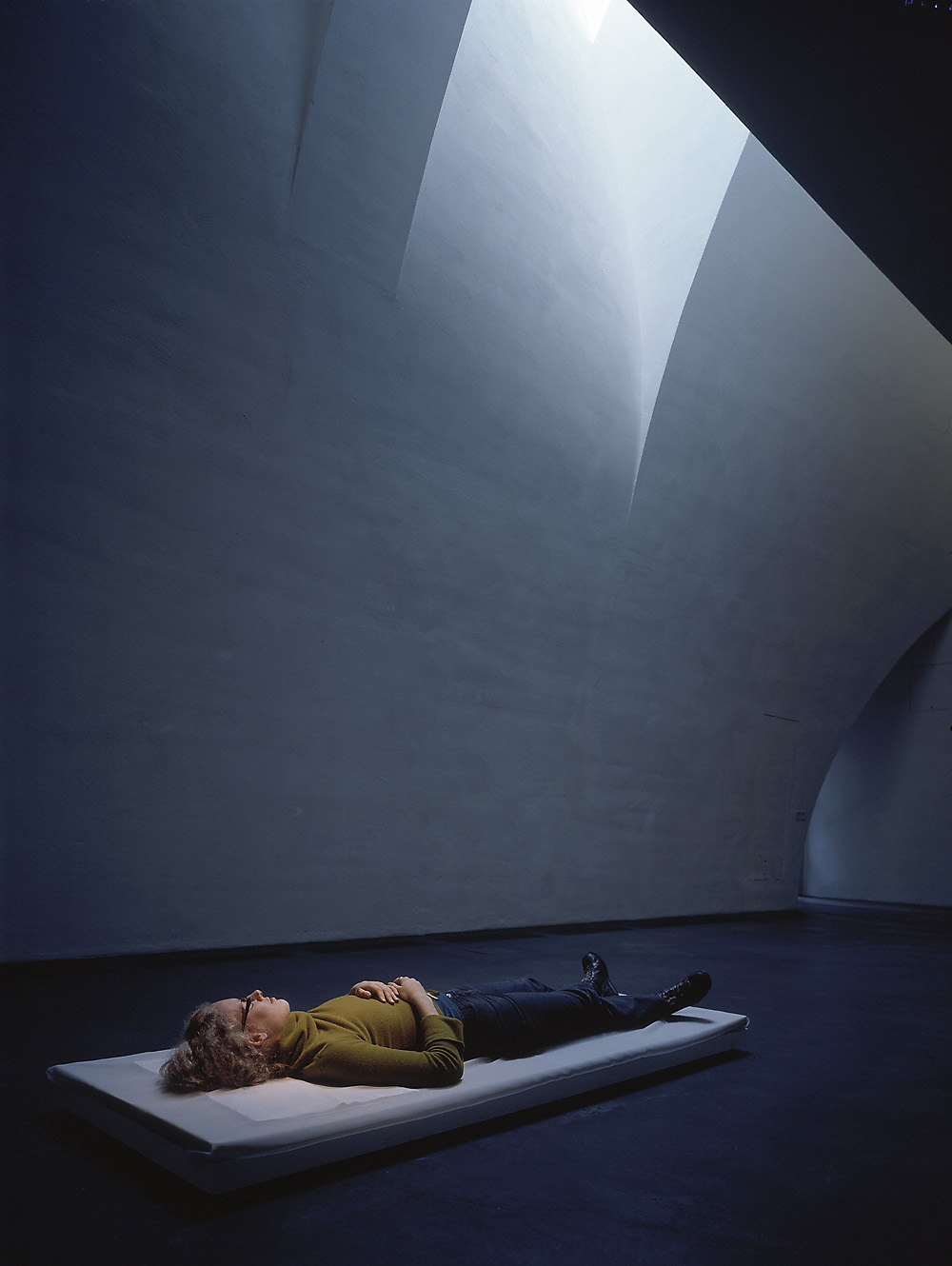
Open space

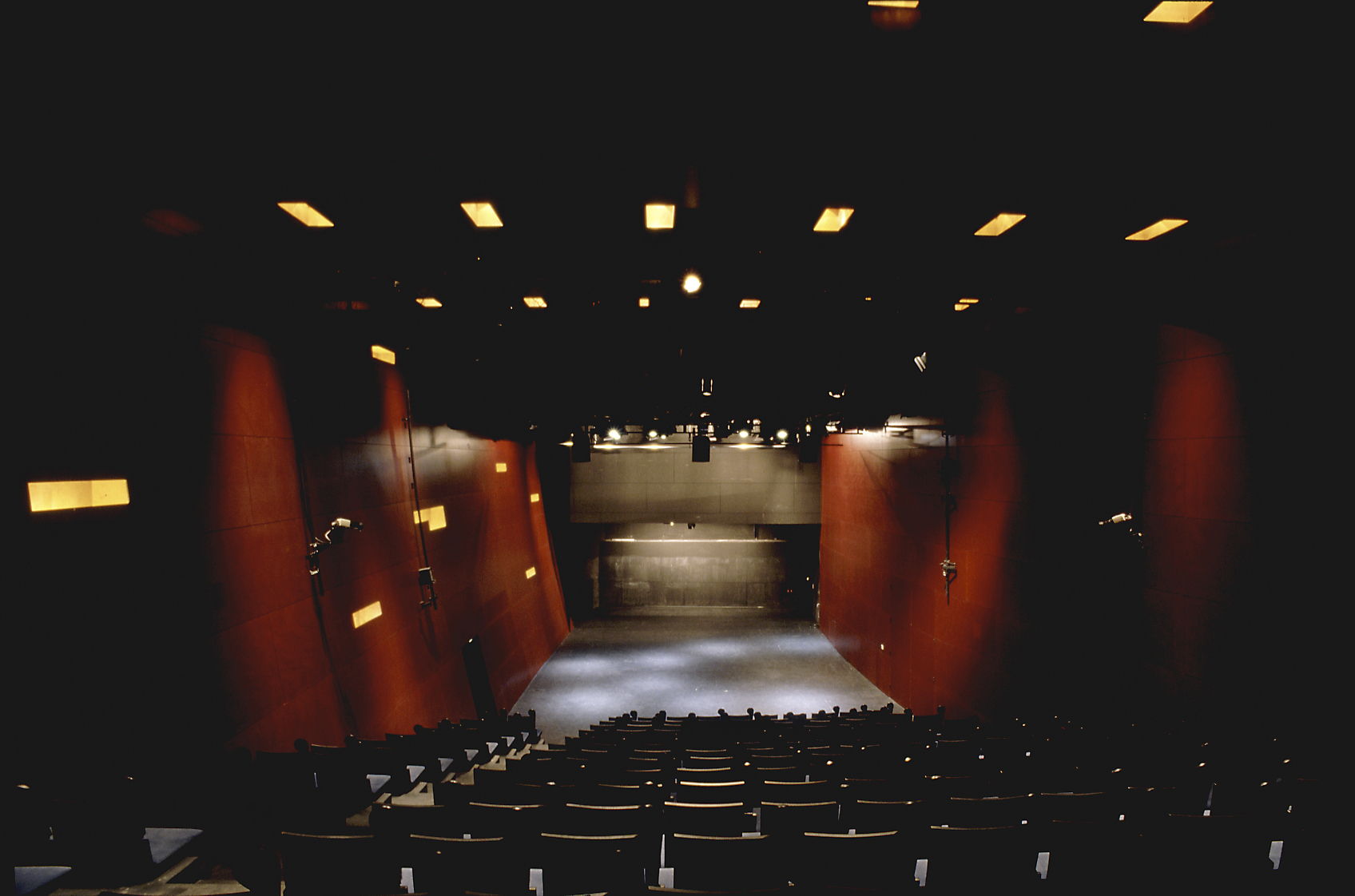
Theatre

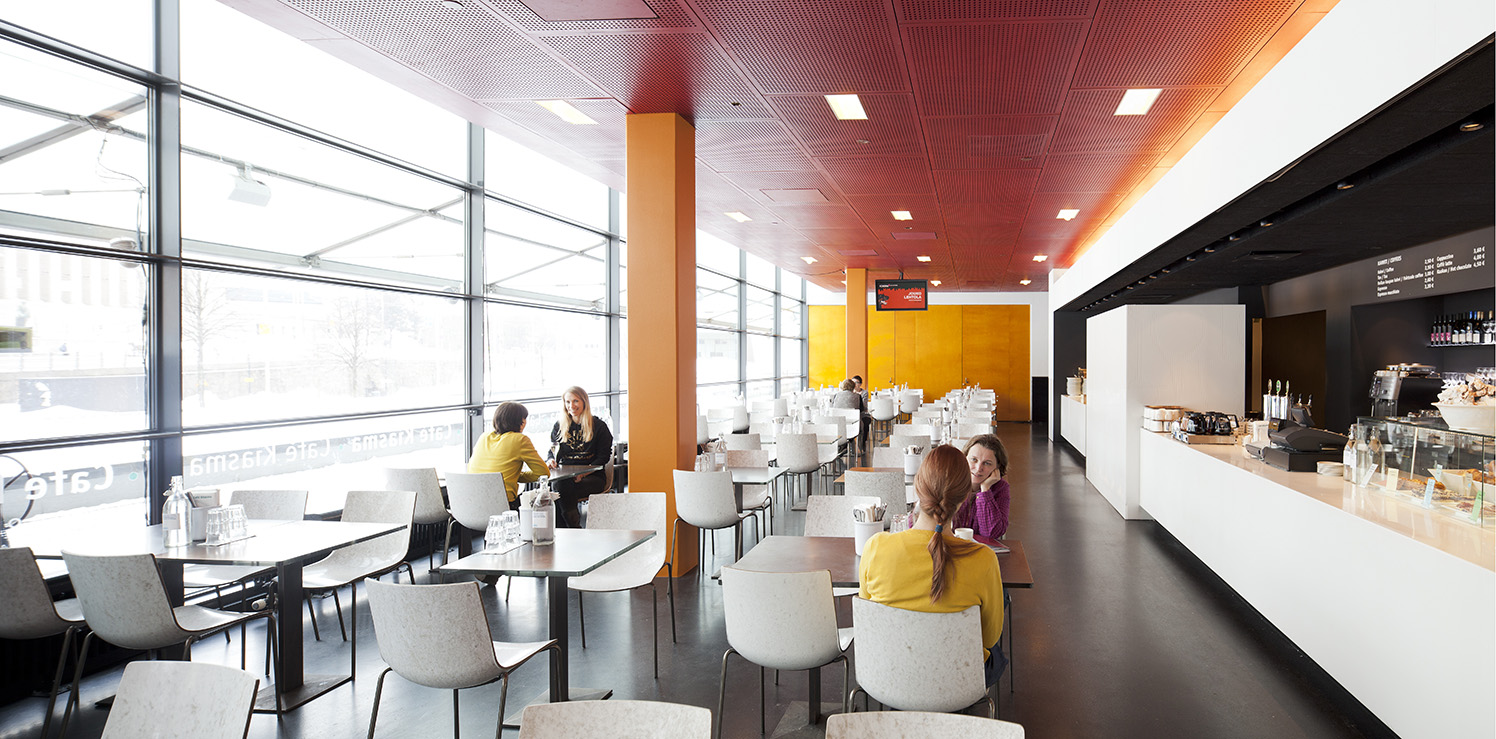
Kiasma Café

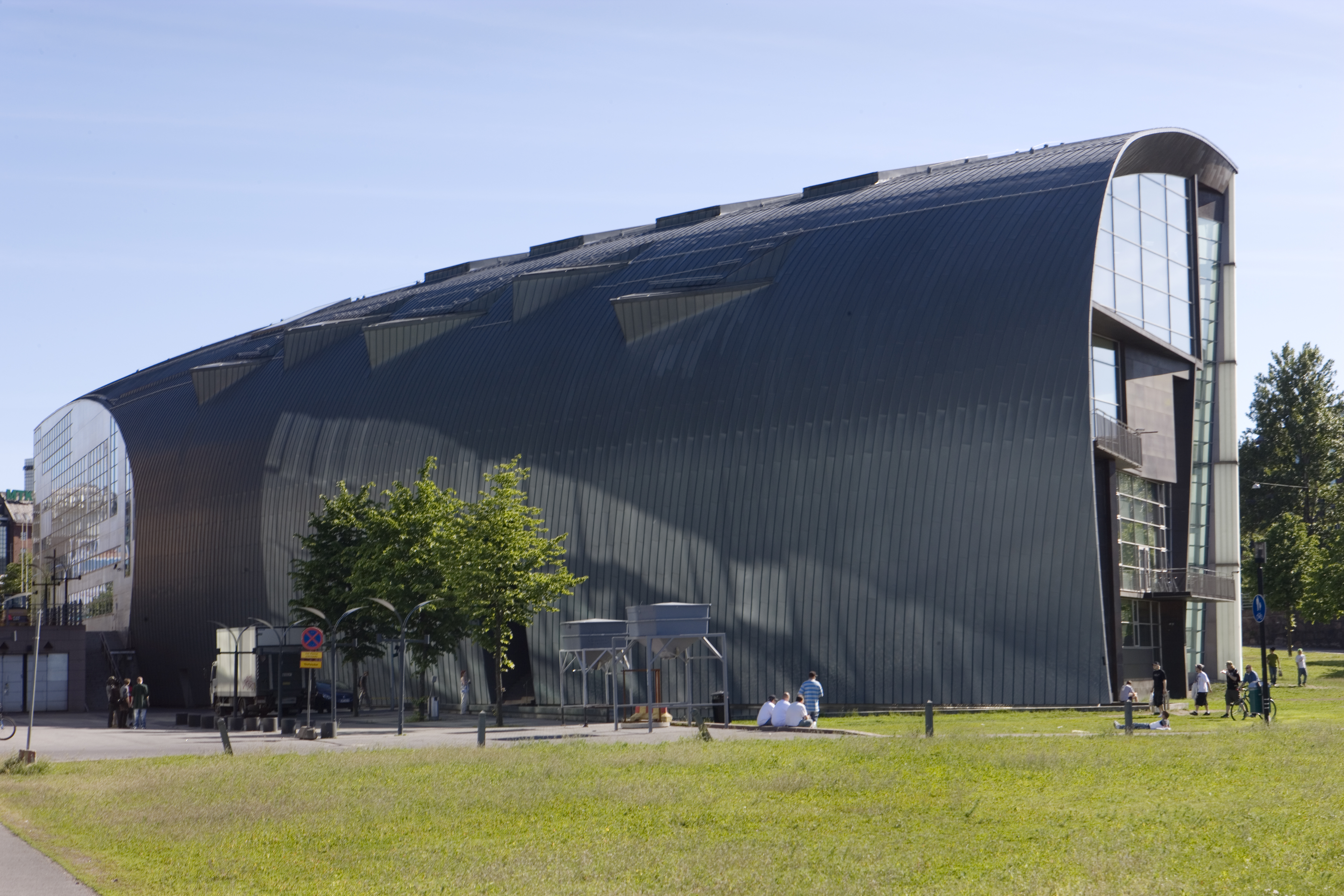
Northeast side, with zinc plating (the details on the very northern end are of brass)

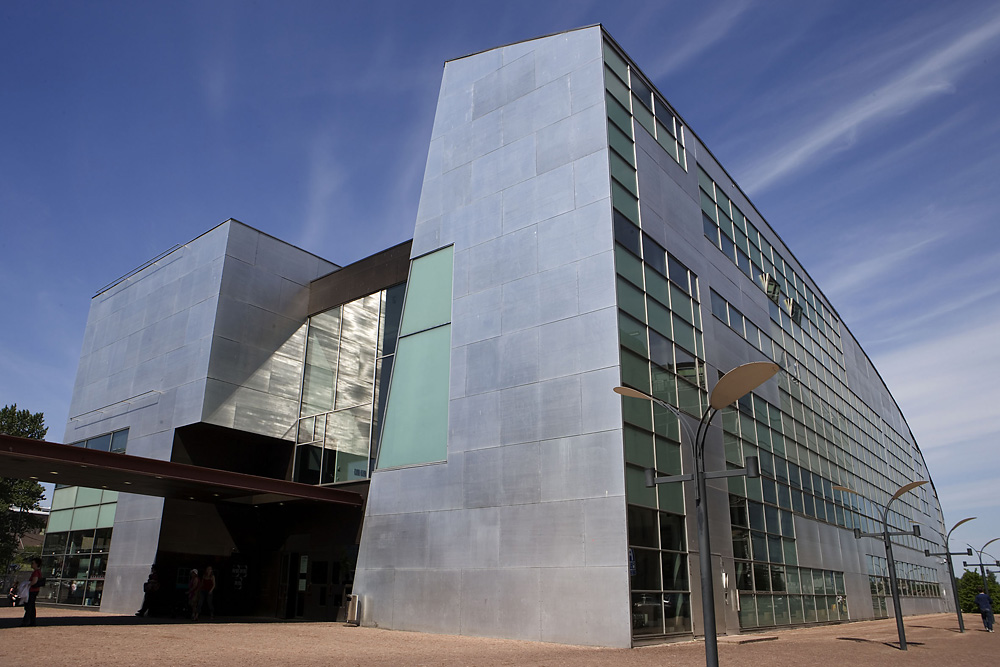
Southern side

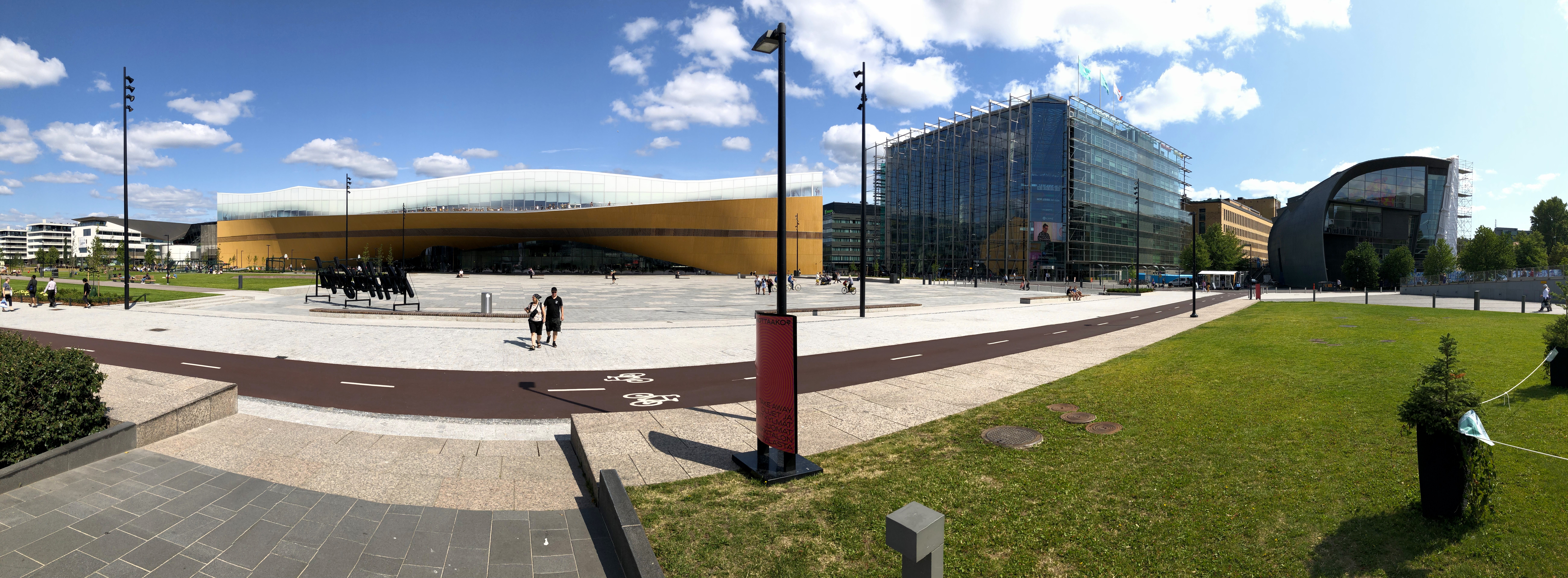
View from the north of the Kansalaistori Square, with Kiasma on the right, to the left Helsinki Central Library Oodi and Sanoma House

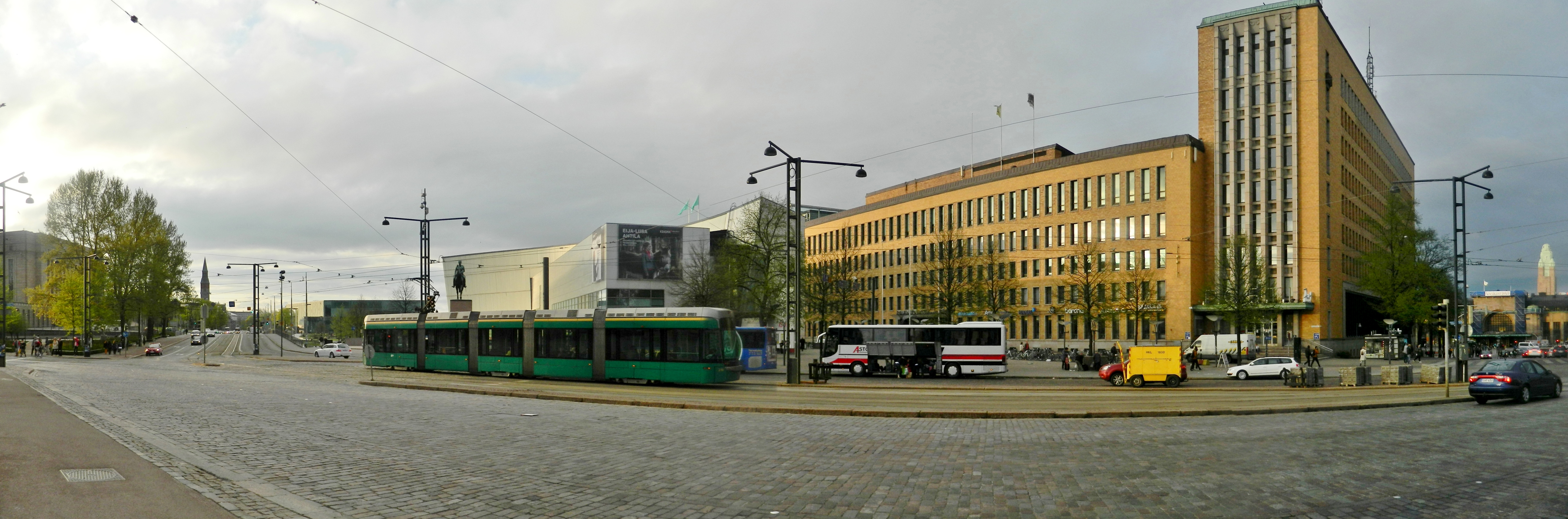
View from the south, with Helsinki Central Station visible on the right edge

== See also ==
- Finnish National Gallery
  - Ateneum
  - Sinebrychoff Art Museum
- EMMA – Espoo Museum of Modern Art
- List of national galleries
