= Nikolai Sinebrychoff =

Russian businessman

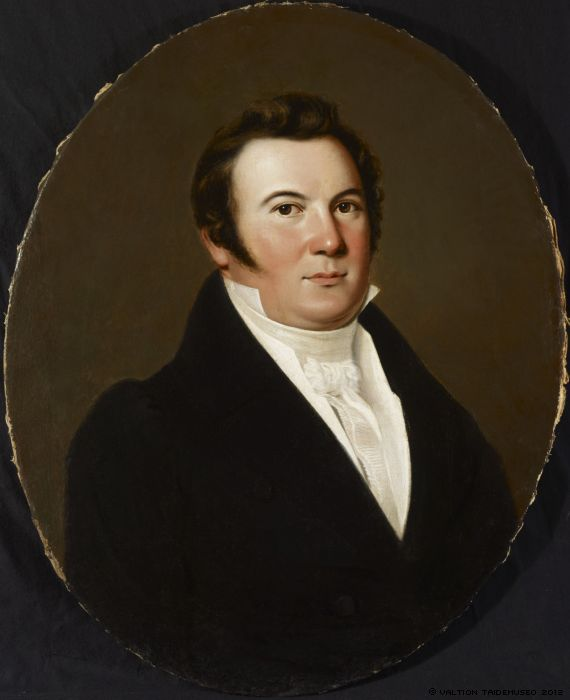
A portrait of Nikolai Sinebrychoff by Johan Erik Lindh in the 1830s.

Nikolai Sinebrychoff (Note: Nikolai Sinebrychoff could not speak Finnish or Swedish and used the Russian pronunciation [nikɔˈɫai sinʲeˈbrjuxɔf] for his name.) (Russian: Николай Петрович Синебрюхов, romanized: Nikolai Petrovich Sinebryukhov; Russian pronunciation: [nʲɪkɐˈlaj sinʲeˈbrjuxɔf]; born c. 1789 – 23 January [O.S. 11 January] 1848) was a Russian businessman settled in the Grand Duchy of Finland, who founded the Sinebrychoff brewery in 1809. He belonged to the Sinebrychoff family which had a long history in Finland.

== Life ==
Pyotr Sinebryukhov (Sinebrychoff), father of Nikolai Sinebrychoff, was originally a poor tenant farmer, who moved to Kymi in Old Finland in the late 1790s and founded a brewery to serve the Ruotsinsalmi sea fortress. As his eldest son, Nikolai Sinebrychoff became the director of the brewery at age 16, when Pyotr Sinebrychoff died in 1805. The family business soon expanded to other areas. After the Finnish War, Sinebrychoff moved the business activity from Ruotsinsalmi, which had become insignificant, to Suomenlinna (then known as Sveaborg) near the city of Helsinki. He was one of the official food merchants for the Russian garrison. In 1816 he won the right to sell spirits, beer, small beer and sima to the Sveaborg soldiers, who had a great demand for them. He also sold food to the garrison in five shops and soon became rich.

In 1817 Sinebrychoff bought the lot of an old spirits factory in Ullanlinna, Helsinki and acquired the right to manufacture and sell spirits, which he then regularly renewed up to his death. After buying a brewery in Vanhakaupunki he acquired a monopoly for brewery activities in Helsinki in 1819. In the same year, he received permission to build a brewery on the lot south of Hietalahdentori. However, the activity was only moved there from Ullanlinna in 1829 when the new premises were completed. In 1842 a luxurious new main building was built in the brewery area, which currently houses the Sinebrychoff Art Museum. In 1836, Sinebrychoff bought a three-hectare lot near the brewery, creating the Sinebrychoff park. Sinebrychoff himself never moved to Helsinki, but instead lived in the house he had commissioned for himself in Sveaborg, which was later dismantled. He never learned either Swedish or Finnish but always conducted his business in Russian.

Sinebrychoff was also a significant renovator in Helsinki. By request from the state, he commissioned the Turku barracks in Kamppi from 1830 to 1833. Sinebrychoff was awarded the title of commercial official in 1835. His business eventually expanded also to abroad. He died in 1848 of pneumonia on a business trip to Tver.

== Legacy ==
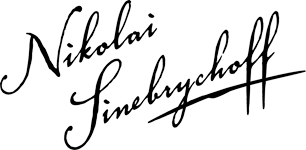
Nikolai Sinebrychoff's signature, which is nowadays used in the labels of the Nikolai Sinebrychoff beer cans.

Nikolai Sinebrychoff never married or had children. After his death, his younger brothers Ivan and Pavel Sinebrychoff became the directors of the brewery, later joined by Pavel's children Nicolas and Paul Sinebrychoff, who also received the title of commercial official. The family grave is located at the Helsinki Orthodox cemetery.

In 1988 the Sinebrychoff brewery introduced the Nikolai Sinebrychoff beer to honour its founder.
