= Iso Roobertinkatu =

Street in Helsinki, Finland

Coordinates: 60°9′46″N 24°56′26″E

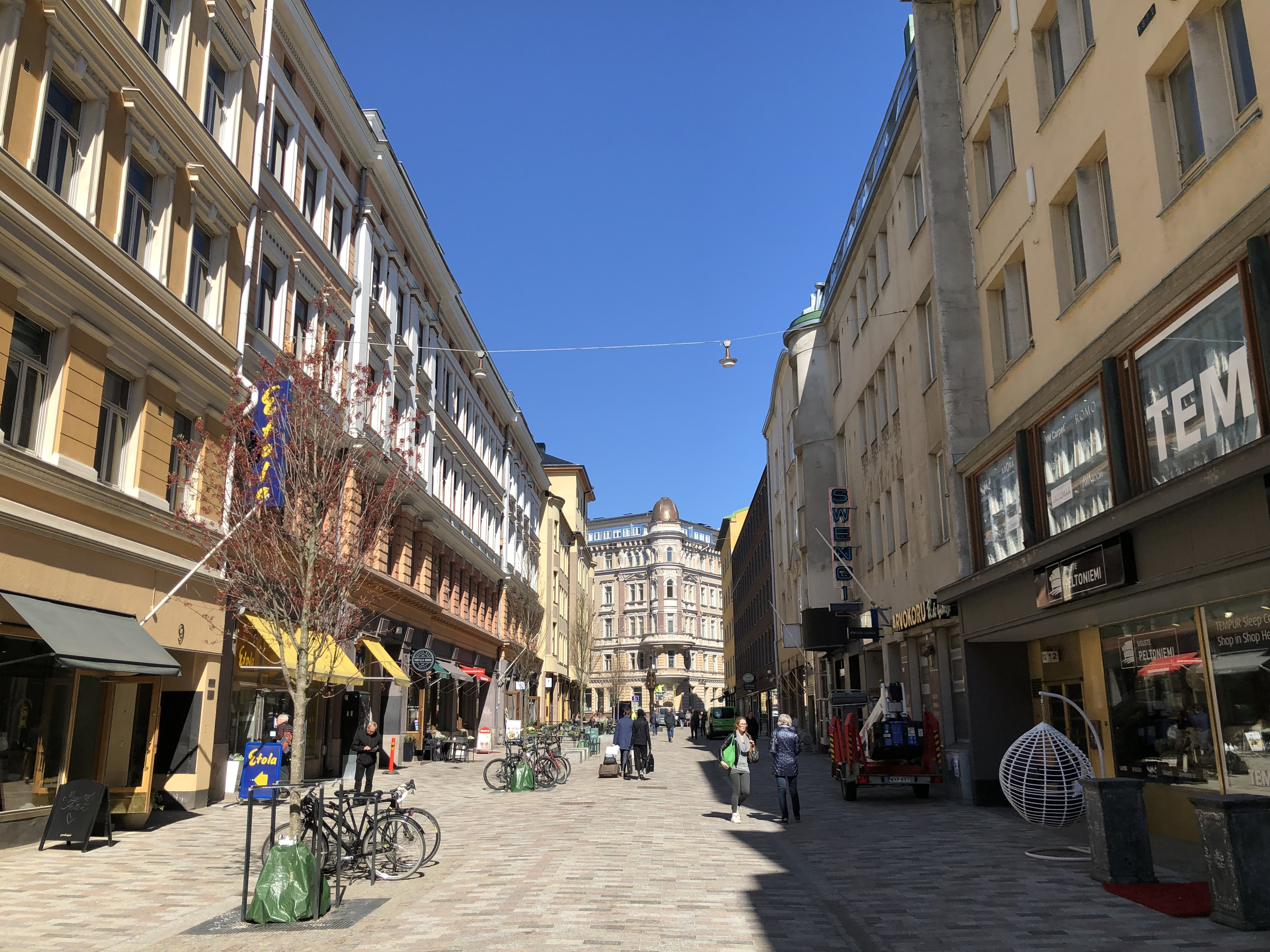
Iso Roobertinkatu in 2019.

Iso Roobertinkatu (Swedish: Stora Robertsgatan), meaning "great Robert street", is a street running northeast-southwest in the Punavuori district in Helsinki, Finland. Its shorter east-west counterpart Pieni Roobertinkatu ("little Robert street") is located near it in Kaartinkaupunki. Both streets are named after Robert Henrik Rehbinder (1777–1841). Iso Roobertinkatu is among the best known pedestrian and shopping streets in Helsinki. In the southwest the street, unlike other streets in Punavuori, does not extend to Telakkakatu or the sea shore but instead ends at the Sinebrychoff Park with stairs leading from the end of the street onto the cliff at the park. At the western end of the street a very short street called Kivenhakkaajankatu ("stonemason street") branches off to the left, ending at the intersection with Punavuorenkatu. In the northeast Iso Roobertinkatu reaches to Yrjönkatu, east of which it continues under the name of Pieni Roobertinkatu, but not exactly in the same direction.

The Swedish names for Iso and Pieni Roobertinkatu were taken into use already in 1820. The Finnish names were Ropertin Suurikatu and Ropertin Pikkukatu ("Robert's great street" and "Robert's little street", respectively) in a 1866 map, and in the 1890s the names were changed to Iso and Pikku Robertinkatu, made official in 1909. The Finnish spelling of the names was fixed in 1928.

Reserving Iso Roobertinkatu mainly for public transport and pedestrian traffic was first proposed at different boards of the city council of Helsinki in the 1950s. The part of Iso Roobertinkatu between Fredrikinkatu and Yrjönkatu was converted into a pedestrian zone after the city council approved a change in the zoning plan in May 1983. Helsinki's first proper pedestrian zone was opened on Iso Roobertinkatu on 14 September 1985.

Streets crossing Iso Roobertinkatu include from east to west: Yrjönkatu, Annankatu, Fredrikinkatu, Albertinkatu and the short street Kivenhakkaajankatu, leading from the end of Iso Roobertinkatu to Punavuorenkatu running in the same direction.

At the start of the street is the 1995 modern sculpture Viheltävä helsinkiläinen ("the whistling Helsinkian"), donated by sculptor Björn Weckström to the city of Helsinki.
