= Battery (drink) =

Finnish energy drink

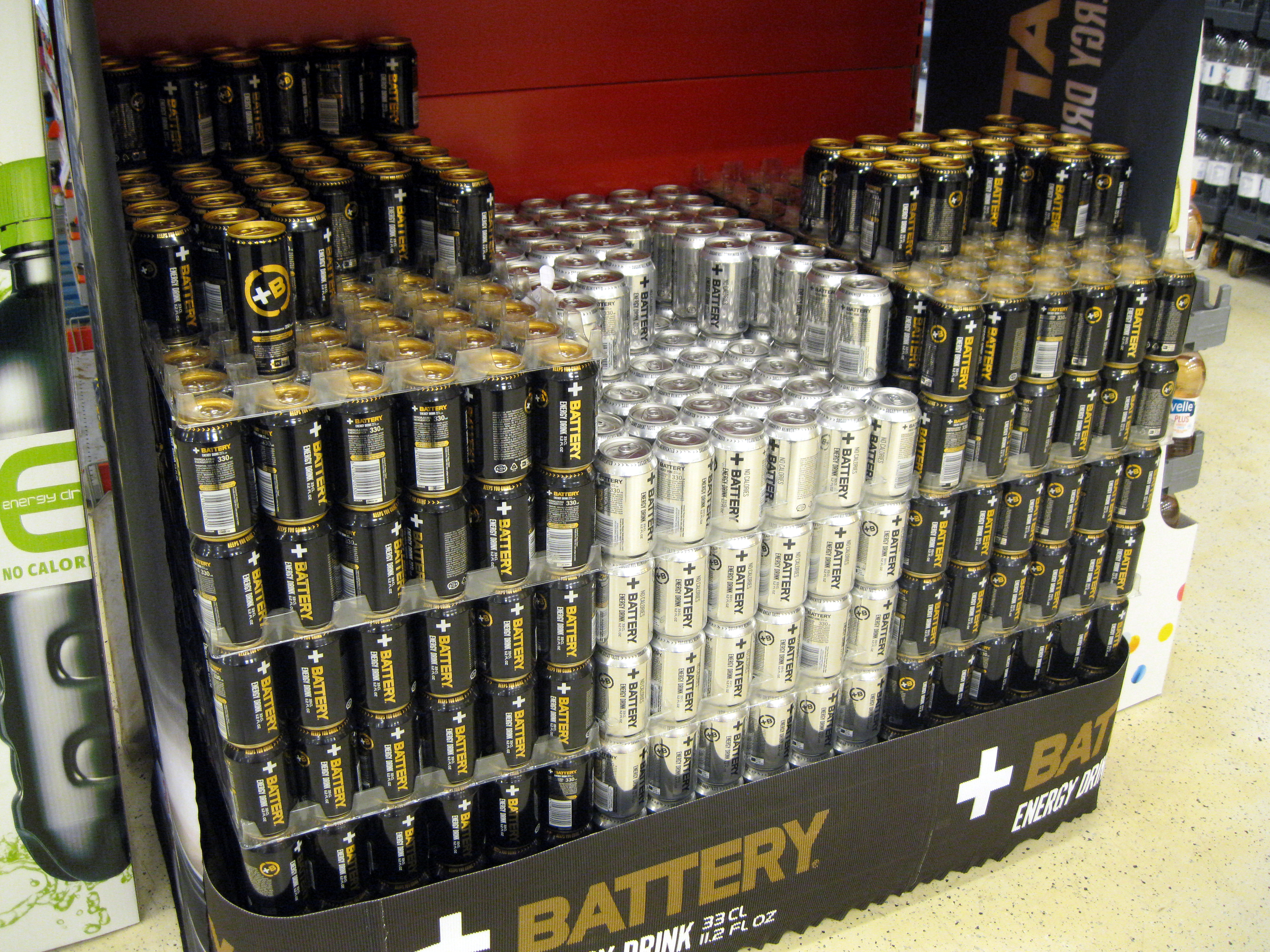
Battery Energy Drink

Battery is a brand of energy drinks produced by the Finnish brewery Sinebrychoff. Their stimulating effects are based on coffee and guarana extracts as well as taurine.

Sinebrychoff is part of the international brewery group Carlsberg. The energy drink was launched in 1997 and is currently sold in various flavors in over 35 countries.

The basic idea of the brand is to provide energy like an electric battery and to look like one. The brand's slogan is "Keeps you going".

== Products ==
In addition to the brand's original energy drink, called Battery Energy Drink, several variations have been produced, including coffeed, cranberry, sugar-free, gingered, juiced orange, fully charged tropical, jungleda and more. The availability of the different flavors varies by country and according to the market.

In Finland, previously, there have also been other flavors available: Heat with cranberry and chili flavors, orange juice, and energy shots.

The energy drinks are mainly sold in plastic bottles of 40 cl (14 imp fl oz; 14 US fl oz) and in cans of 33 cl (12 imp fl oz; 11 US fl oz). In August 2010, in Finland, a limited-edition pint cans (0.568 liters) were launched as "Battery Limited Edition 0.568 L". Currently, the product is sold under the name "Big Edition" since the sales are no longer limited.

The design of the bottles was renewed in March 2011, and the content was changed to 40 cl (14 imp fl oz; 14 US fl oz) instead of 45 cl (16 imp fl oz; 15 US fl oz). At the same time, the price per bottle decreased.

== Internationalization ==
Developed and launched in Finland in January 1997, Battery has been sold in international markets since its inception. In the summer of 1997, it was launched in Estonia, Latvia and Lithuania, and in the following year in Norway and Sweden. Nowadays, it is being sold in approximately 40 countries in all populated continents.

There have been local specialties in product characteristics and promotions. For example, the appearance of the can in Yemen has been adjusted to better fit Arabic culture by replacing the plus sign with a lightning bolt.
