= Sinebrychoff =

Finnish brewery

The Sinebrychoff Brewery (Finnish pronunciation: [ˈsinebrykof], Finland Swedish pronunciation: [sineˈbrykːofː]) is a Finnish brewery and soft drink company. It was founded in 1819 in Helsinki, Grand Duchy of Finland, by the Russian businessman Nikolai Sinebrychoff who lived in Finland, and it is the largest brewery in Finland today. By the end of 1999, ownership of the company was completely transferred to the Carlsberg Breweries A/S.

== Brief details ==
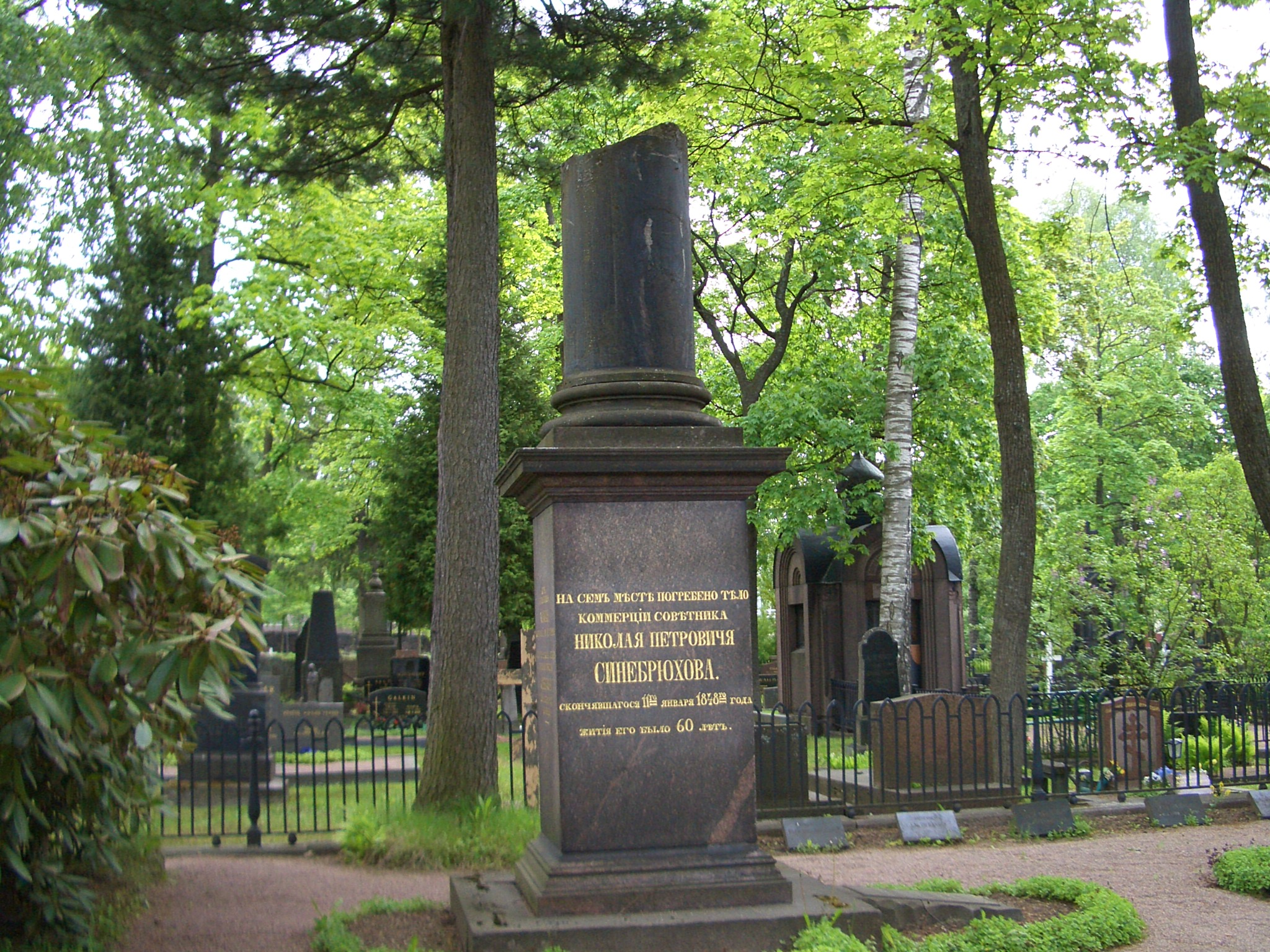
The tomb of Nikolai Sinebryukhov (Sinebrychoff) in Helsinki

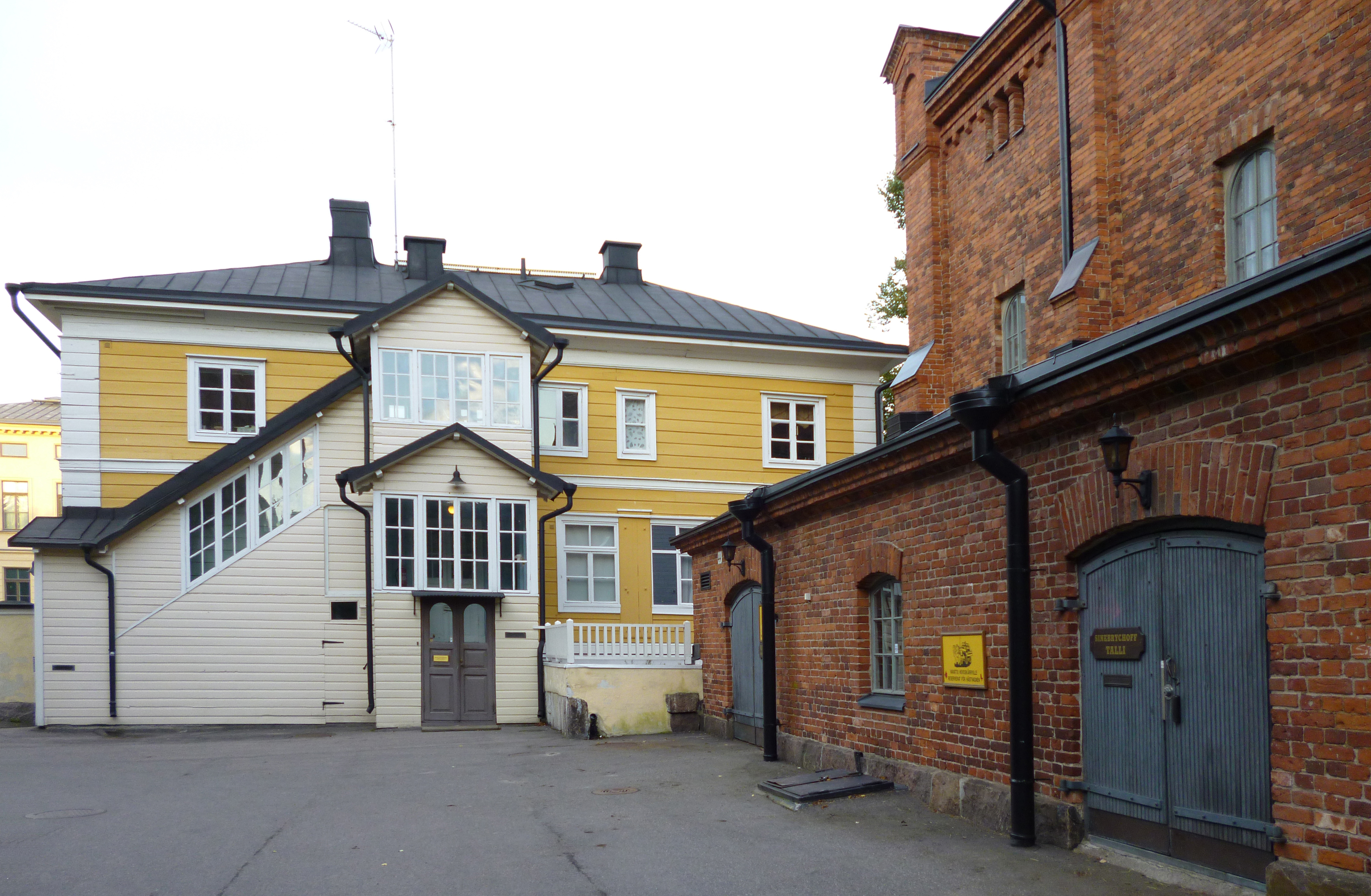
Sinebrychoff stable buildings, Sinebrychoff park, Helsinki

Founded in 1819, the Sinebrychoff brewery is the oldest still operating brewery in the Nordic countries. Originally located in Helsinki, all of the Sinebrychoff brewery operations are now based in Kerava.

The Sinebrychoff logo consists of two brewery horses beneath a golden crown. Since 2009, the horses are blue, on a white background. The company also uses the logo with colors reversed, white horses on blue background.

== Beverages ==
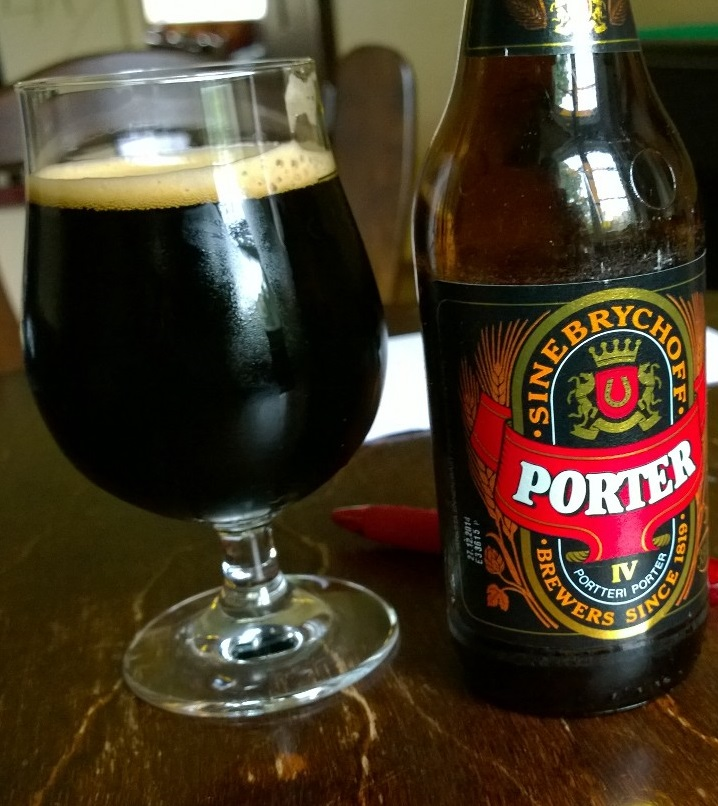
Sinebrychoff's Porter beer

The most notable Sinebrychoff products are the Koff brand of lager and porter. Sinebrychoff also produces the popular Karhu brand of beer as well as other special and seasonal beers and a large amount of other beverages.

Sinebrychoff owns the license for manufacturing Coca-Cola, Fanta, Sprite, Bonaqua, and Powerade in Finland as well as the licenses to produce Schweppes and Dr Pepper. Sinebrychoff's own soft drink products include Muumi and Smurffi, the Battery energy drink family and the Hyvää Päivää health drink family.

== See also ==
- Sinebrychoff family
- Sinebrychoff Art Museum, the Sinebrychoff family house and original brewery
- Sinebrychoff park, a popular park in Punavuori, Helsinki, next to the Sinebrychoff Art Museum
- Karhusaari Art Centre, formerly known as Villa Sinebrychoff
