= Sinebrychoff Art Museum =

- Sinebrychoffin taidemuseo Konstmuseet Sinebrychoff; Художественный музей Синебрюхова
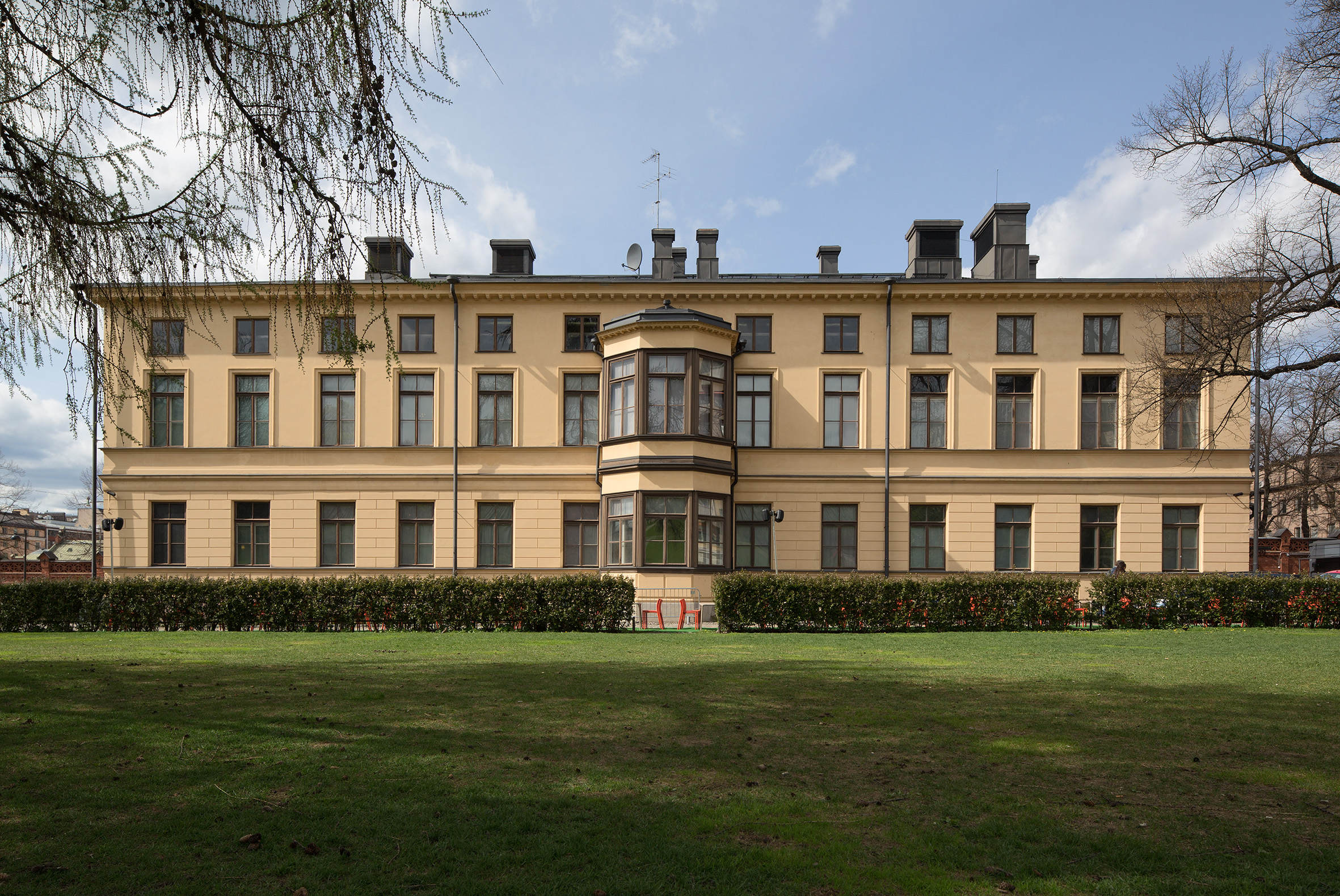
- The southern façade of the museum building

- The location of the museum in Helsinki
- Established: 1921 (House museum); 1980 (National art gallery)
- Location: Punavuori, Helsinki, Finland
- Coordinates: 60.16251°N 24.93256°E
- Type: Art museum
- Collections: European art
- Director: Kirsi Eskelinen
- Curator: Ira Westergård
- Owner: Finnish National Gallery
- Website: sinebrychoffintaidemuseo.fi

The Sinebrychoff Art Museum is an art museum located on Bulevardi in Helsinki, Finland. The museum exhibits the old European art collections (dating between the 14th and 19th centuries) of the Finnish National Gallery. In addition, half of the museum acts as a historic house museum, displaying the 19th century estate of the Sinebrychoff family.

== History ==
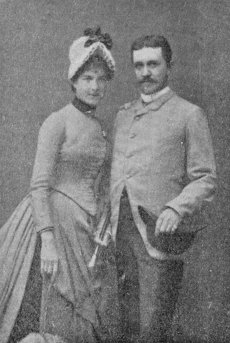
Paul and Fanny Sinebrychoff, responsible for a large portion of the museum's collections

The building housing the museum was constructed in 1842 by the Russian businessman Nikolai Sinebrychoff, whose brewery, Sinebrychoff, operated in the western side of the premises until 1992. Nikolai himself did not live in the house, staying instead in Sveaborg (present-day Suomenlinna). His brother's family lived in the house, and his nephew, Paul, began an art collection. Paul continued to collect European art after being appointed head of the company in 1904. Along with his actress wife, Fanny Sinebrychoff, he amassed a collection of about 900 items, mostly paintings (100 by the Old Masters and approximately 350 portrait miniatures), but also including antique furniture, silverware, and porcelain.

In 1921, Paul and Fanny Sinebrychoff donated their collection to the Finnish government. It continues to be the largest art donation ever made in Finland. This was the same year that the house opened up as a historic house museum, showcasing 19th century upper class life. The donated art collection was not kept in the house, though it was returned in 1959 with funding from the Sinebrychoff company. In 1975, the Finnish government bought the entire building from the brewery, and, after restoration, opened the building as a museum in 1980. Collections featuring old European art were moved from Ateneum to the Sinebrychoff Art Museum.

In 1990, the Sinebrychoff Art Museum was incorporated into the Valtion taidemuseo (National Art Museum). Following its disbandment in 2013, the Sinebrychoff Art Museum was incorporated into the newly formed Finnish National Gallery, in which it is one of three museums, the others being Ateneum and Kiasma.

== Collections ==
The collections of the Sinebrychoff Art Museum are composed primarily of old European paintings, primarily by the Old Masters. The museum's paintings are divided among 10 collections, including The "Paul and Fanny Sinebrychoff Collection", the "Collection of the Friends of the Ateneum Art Museum", and the "Carl von Haartman Collection". In addition to paintings, the museum also hosts about 4,000 prints and drawings. Other items in the museum include glassware, porcelain, and silverware, as well as some sculptures, clocks, and antique furniture.

Paintings in the Sinebrychoff Art Museum
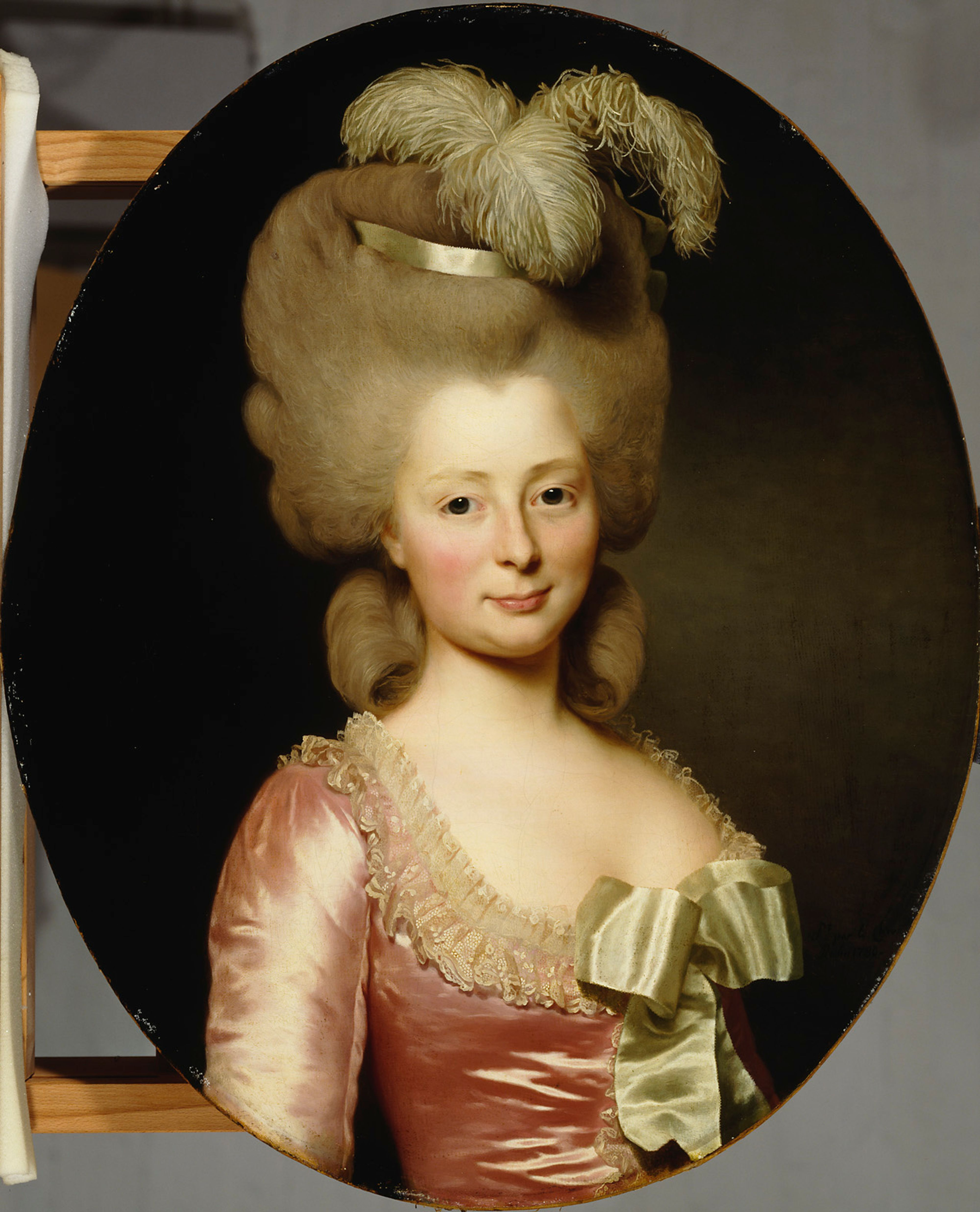
Portrait of a Lady (1780) by Alexander Roslin

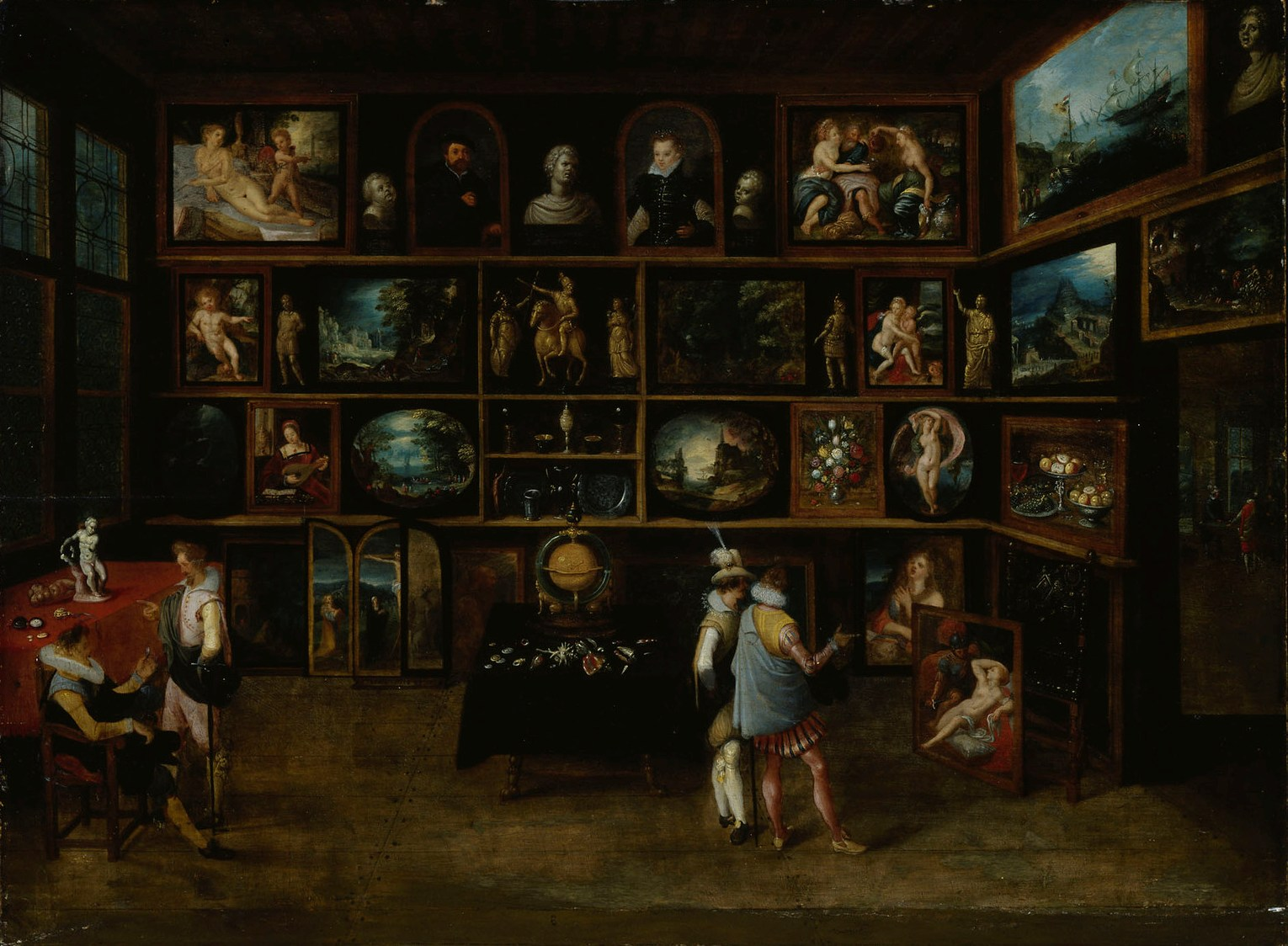
Connoisseurs at a Gallery (1607-1623) by Hieronymus Francken II

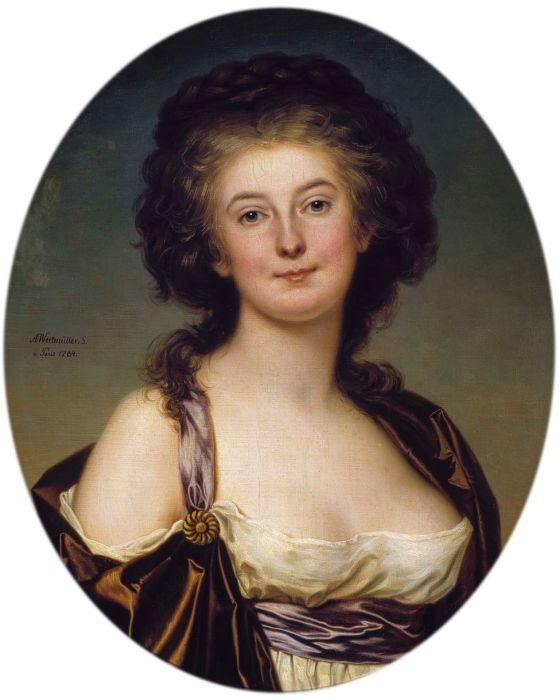
Portrait of Mademoiselle Charlotte Eckerman (1784) by Adolf Ulrik Wertmüller

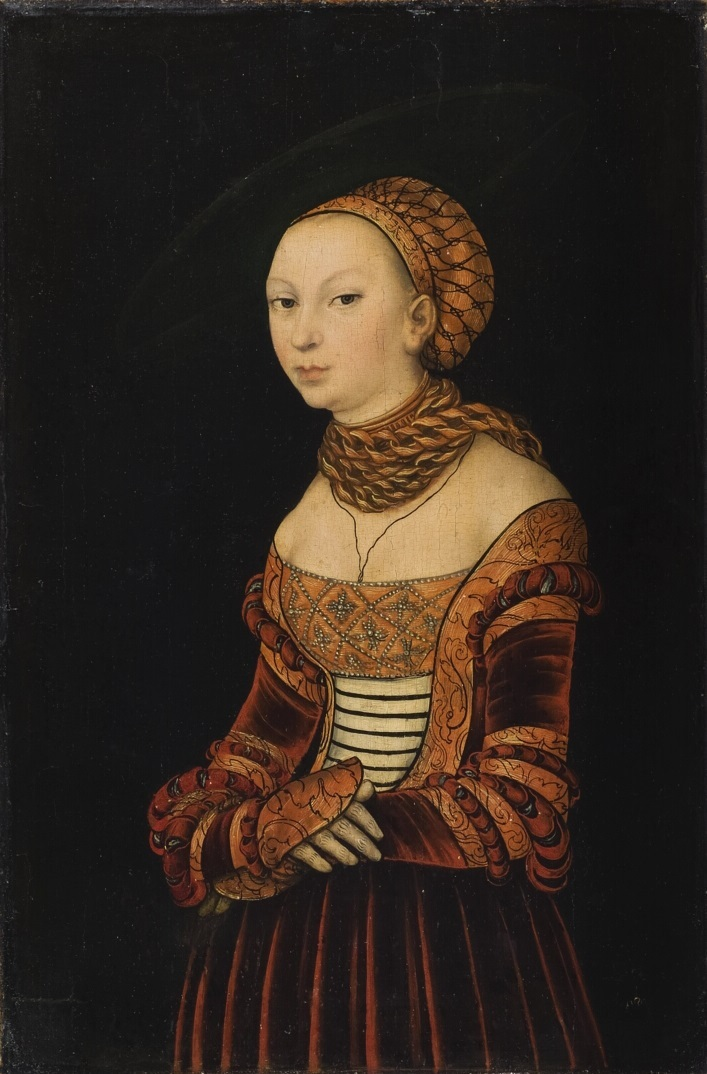
Portrait of a young woman (1525) by Lucas Cranach the Elder

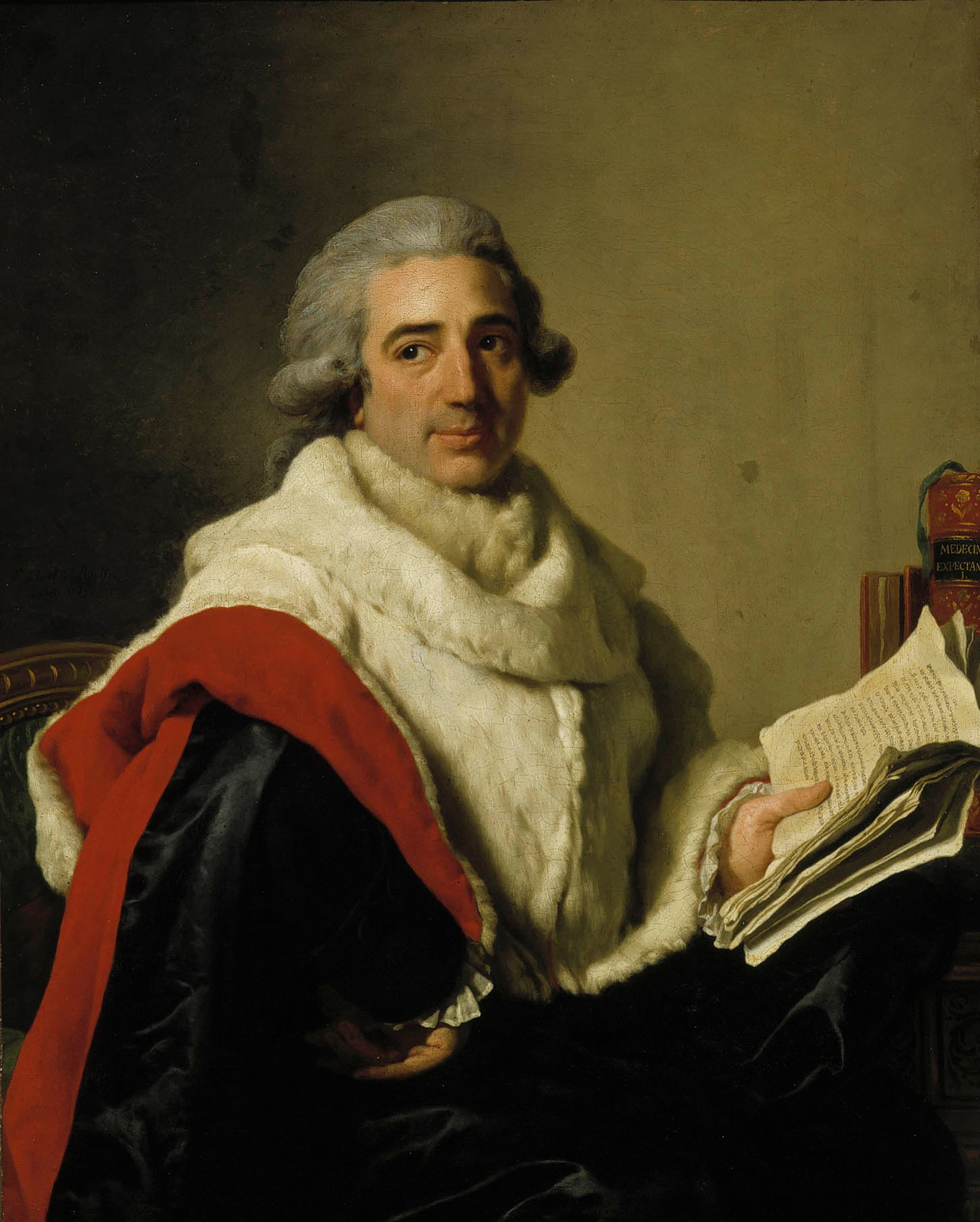
Jean-Baptiste Eugénie Du Mangin or Jean-Baptiste Dumangin, (1744-1826) doctor, by Alexander Roslin Paris 1789.

== See also ==
- Finnish National Gallery
- Ateneum
- Kiasma
- List of national galleries
