= Sinebrychoff family =

Russian-Finnish family

Sinebrychoff Синебрюховы
- Business family
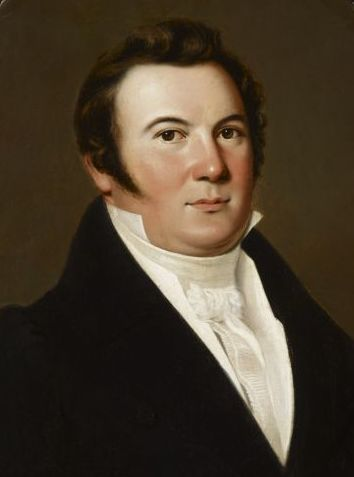
- Nikolai Sinebrychoff
- Current region: Finland
- Origin: Gavrilov Posad, Russia
- Founded: 18th century
- Founder: Peter Sinebrychoff
- Final head: Paul P. Sinebrychoff

The Sinebrychoff family (Russian: Синебрюховы, romanized: Sinebryukhovy; sing. Синебрюхов, Sinebryukhov) was a prominent Russian-Finnish business family. They were the founders of the Sinebrychoff brewery and soft drinks company, and of the Sinebrychoff Art Museum.

== Family roots ==
The family's roots come from the market town of Gavrilov Posad, today's Ivanovo Oblast in central Russia, from the Vladimir Province northeast of Moscow. The business dynasty's founder Peter Sinebrychoff (Pyotr Sinebryukhov, 1750-1805), a second-guild merchant, settled in the region of Kymenlaakso in the late 18th century, after the region was ceded to the Russian Empire. His son, Nikolai Sinebrychoff (1799-1848), was born in Gavrilov Posad but moved to the Grand Duchy of Finland, then an autonomous part of the Russian Empire, in 1817.

== Brewery business ==
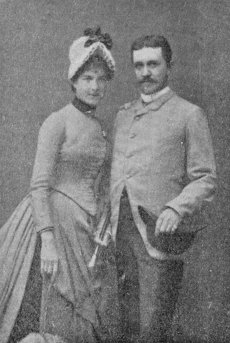
Paul P. Sinebrychoff and his wife Fanny Sinebrychoff

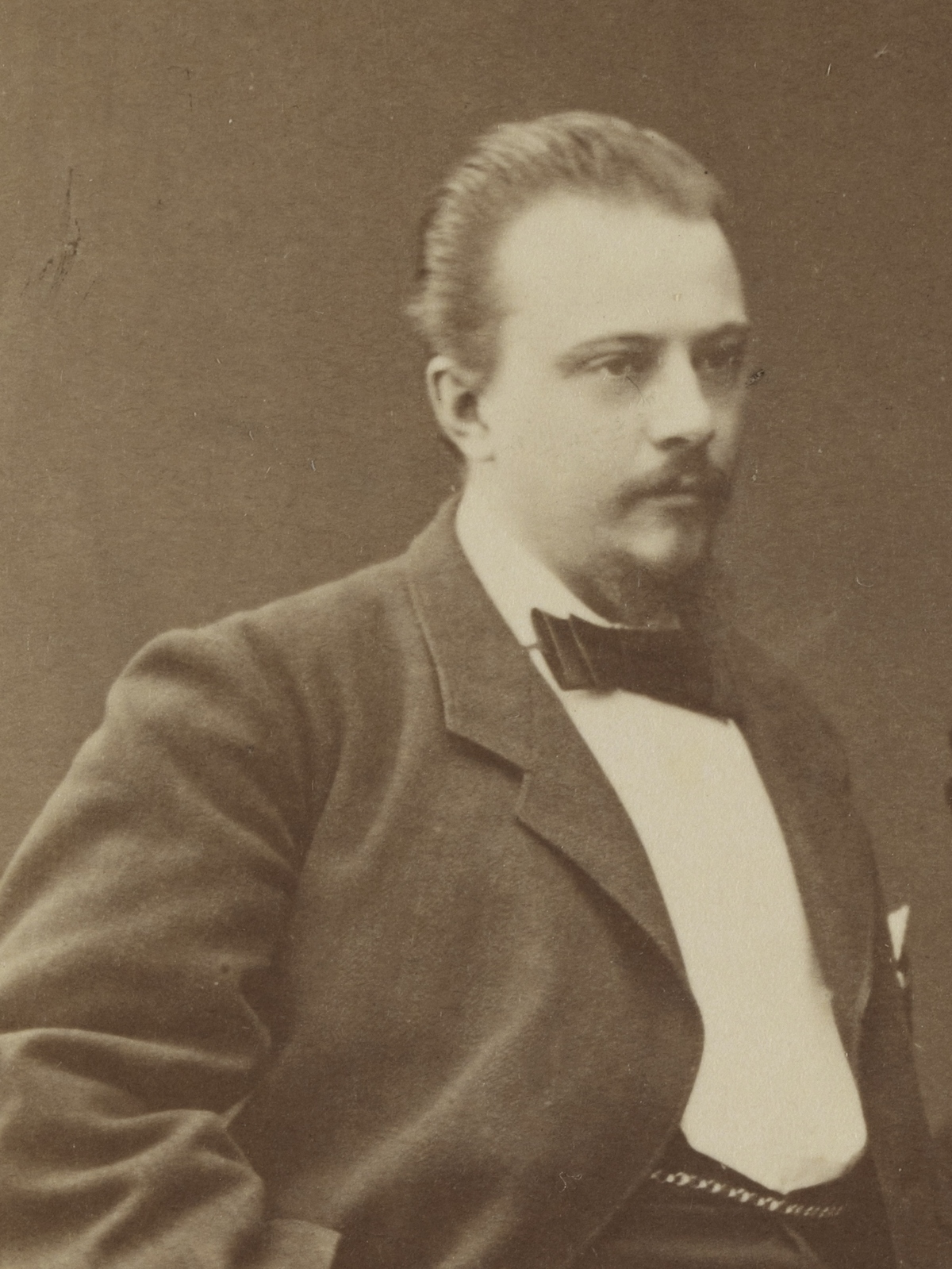
Nicolas Sinebrychoff.

Nikolai Sinebrychoff founded the Sinebrychoff brewery and soon became a supplier for a Russian regiment stationed in the Sveaborg Fortress. He later bought exclusive rights to distill alcohol and brew beer. The Sinebrychoff distillery was based in Hietalahti on the outskirts of Helsinki.

After Nikolai's death, the business was inherited by his younger brother Paul (1799-1883). He developed the family business into a major diversified company active in many sectors of the economy. Brewing has remained the basis of the business.

The business was then succeeded by Paul's son Nicolas Sinebrychoff (1856-1896) and soon after that by Paul P. Sinebrychoff (1859-1917). The Sinebrychoff business group continued its development, becoming the biggest owner of Suomen Yhdyspankki (now part of Nordea).

No male descendants of the Sinebrychoff family remained in Finland after Paul's death in 1917, after which the brewery passed to his sister.

== Art collection ==
Paul P. Sinebrychoff and his wife Fanny were known as major collectors of art. In 1921, Fanny Sinebrychoff donated her husband's art collection to the government of Finland, which became and remains the largest donation ever made to the Finnish state. The collection has become the basis for the Sinebrychoff Art Museum which is located in the former house of Paul and Anna Sinebrychoff.

== See also ==
- Sinebrychoff
- Sinebrychoff Art Museum
- Sinebrychoff park
