= Lonkero =

Finnish mixed drink made from gin and soda

Lonkero Long drink
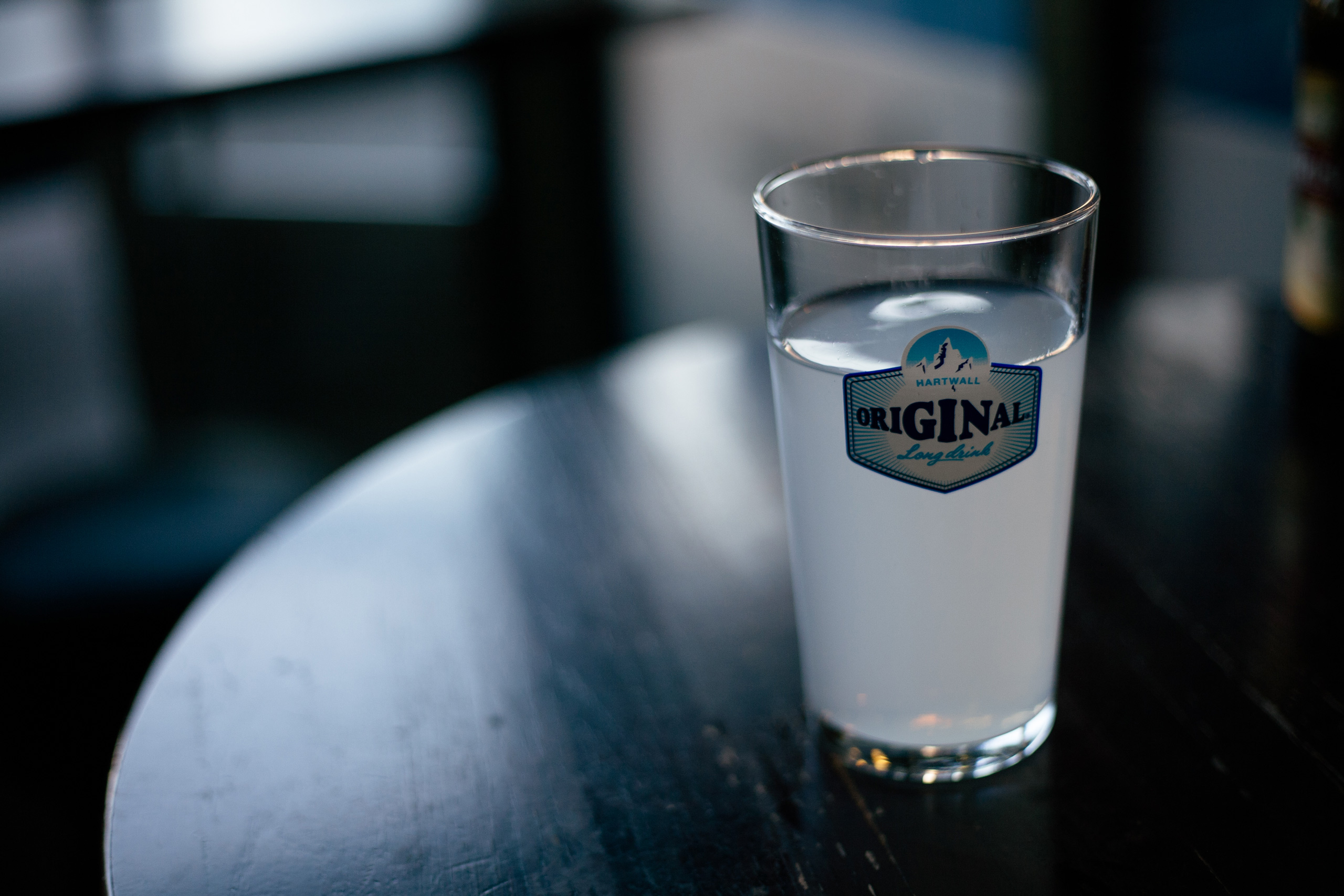
- A glass of lonkero
- Type: ready-mixed drink
- Origin: Finland
- Introduced: 1952
- Alcohol by volume: 5–8.5%
- Proof (US): 10°–17°
- Colour: white
- Ingredients: gin and, most commonly, grapefruit soda
- Variants: cranberry and lime flavour
- Related products: long drink

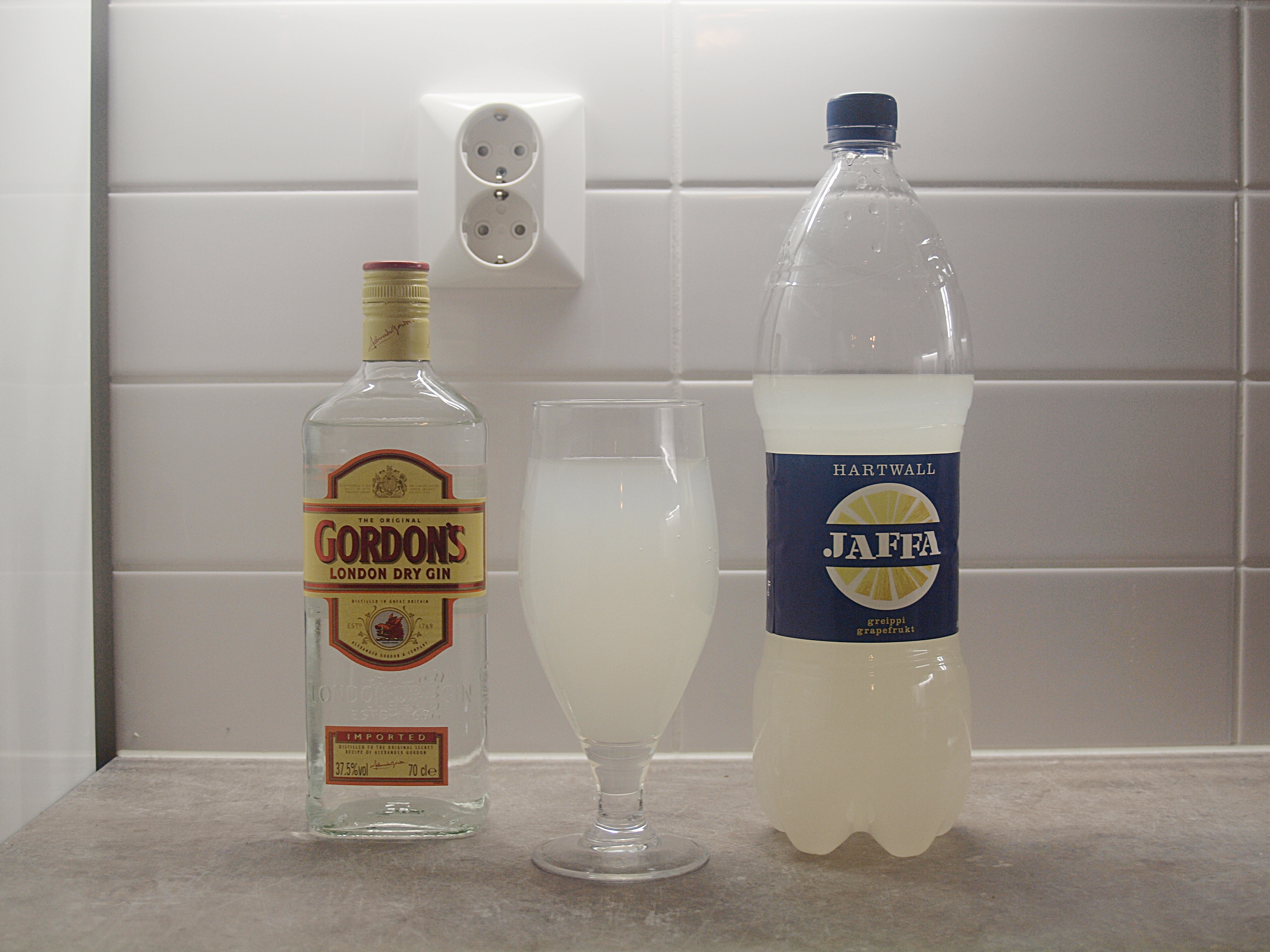
A lonkero, made by combining gin and grapefruit soda

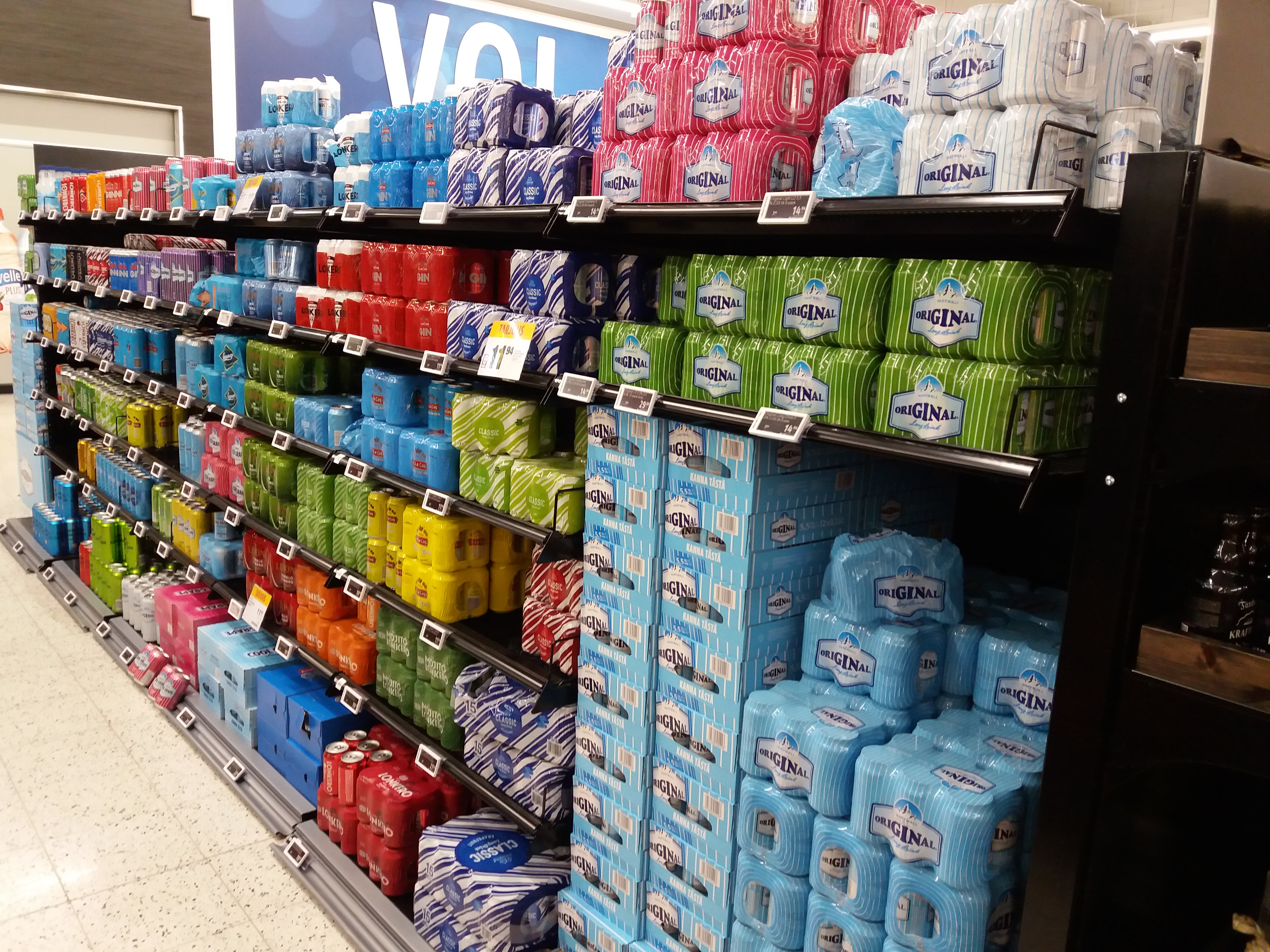
Lonkero sold in a supermarket in Helsinki

Lonkero (Finnish pronunciation: ['loŋkero]) is a Finnish nickname for a long drink, specifically a ready mixed drink made from gin and, most commonly, grapefruit soda, although other long drink flavours include cranberry, raspberry and lime. In Finland, lonkero is available in stores and restaurants, where it can be on draught, bottle or can.

== History ==
In 1952, Finland was preparing to receive increased numbers of visitors connected to the Games of the XV Olympiad in Helsinki, the capital of Finland. As a compromise following the Finnish prohibition (1919–1932), the country was living with a strict state-controlled alcohol policy. In order to help vendors facing a wave of foreign customers, the state allowed some liberalization; Oy Alkoholiliike Ab, the national alcoholic beverage retailing and manufacturing monopoly – whose retailing successor is nowadays Alko Inc – introduced two brands of pre-mixed, bottled, ready to drink long drinks. These were the Gin Long Drink (gin with grapefruit) and the Brandy Long Drink (brandy with Pommac), then co-manufactured with Hartwall. The latter product was discontinued in the 1970s, after which the term long drink became primarily associated with the gin-and-grapefruit beverage in Finland.

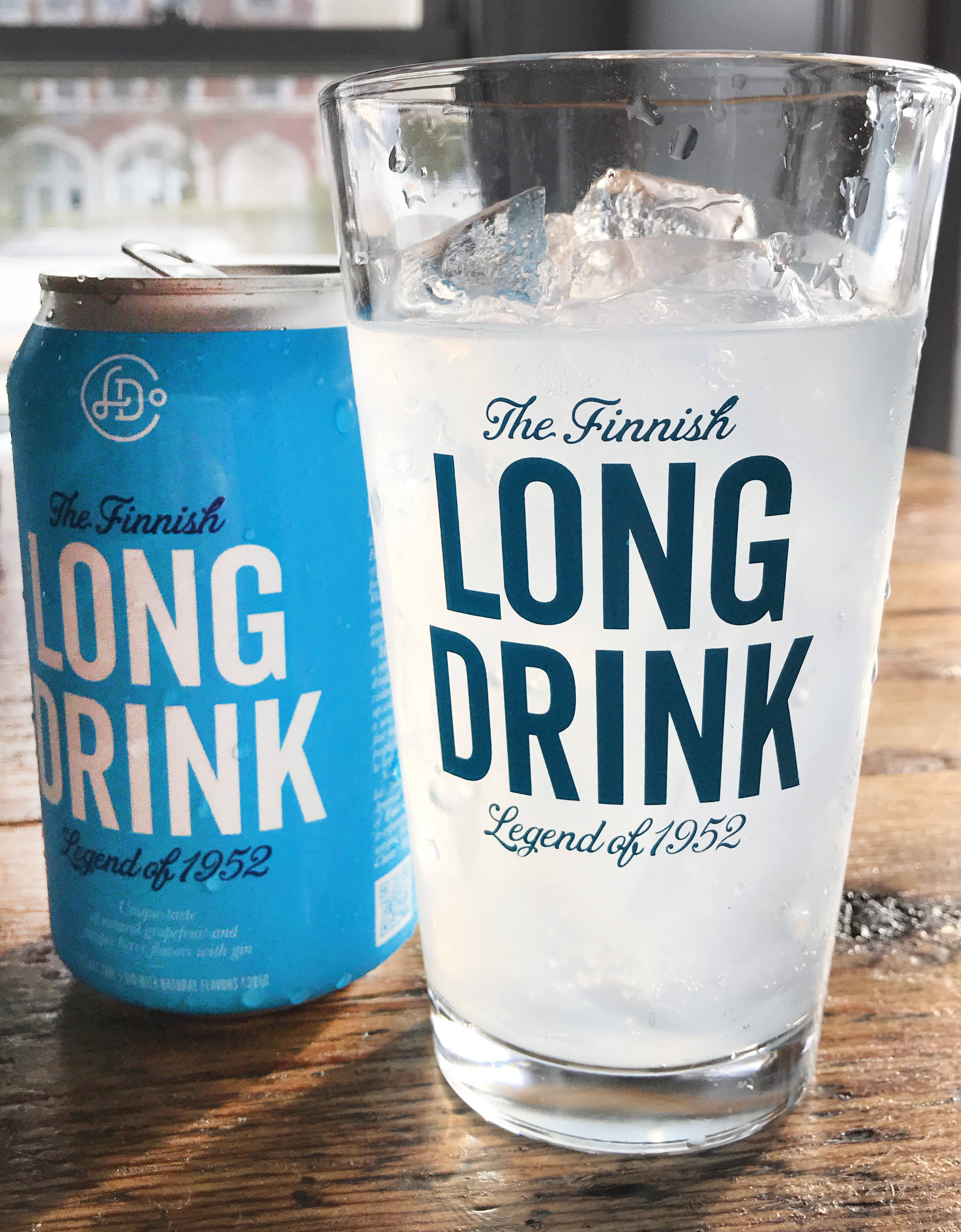
A Finnish-style long drink in the United States

Until Finland joined the European Union in 1995, the production of long drink was strictly controlled by the government. After joining the EU the government was no longer allowed to control the production, and this led to the birth of several long drink brands by different companies. Some experimented with using lemon, orange or other flavors instead of grapefruit. Others started manufacturing mild long drinks based on fermentation rather than on adding spirits. The same composition can be achieved by diluting a 10% cider into 5% with water and gin and grapefruit flavors, and the 5.5% product can be sold in grocery stores. The 2000s saw the reintroduction of the brandy long drink, now manufactured by Laitilan Wirvoitusjuomatehdas.

=== Since 2000 ===
In the Finnish state retail monopoly alcohol store Alko, since 2007 Hartwall Original Long Drink has been the most popular product sold by the store, outselling Koskenkorva, one of the oldest Finnish spirits. Fermented lonkero beverages are sold in ordinary grocery stores under various names like "gin lonkero" or "grapefruit lonkero". The original mixed gin beverages were only sold at Alko due to higher alcohol content (5.5% alc/vol) and the fact that only Alko was allowed to sell non-fermented alcohol until 2018 when the alcohol legislation was changed.

=== Global marketing ===
Long drinks in the Finnish style have been commercially produced and marketed in other nations, including Japan, China, Taiwan and the United States. Miles Teller introduced Long Drink to the United States market. There is also a company called Lonkero Drinks in Norwich, UK, whose long drinks are sold in Norwich, Edinburgh, Brighton and London.

== Name origin ==
The name lonkero comes from the English term long drink, per the similar pronunciation to the word long, but more adapted to the Finnish pronunciation, which prompted producers to use the word as part of their marketing. The Finnish word lonkero literally means "tentacle", but the apparent double meaning is purely coincidental, although it can be humorously stated that when you order "an octopus", it means eight lonkeros.

As the drink is also popular in Estonia, the Finnish name has been borrowed into colloquial Estonian as longero (Estonian pronunciation: [loŋkero]).

== See also ==
- Greyhound
- Paloma
