= Hartwall Original Long Drink =

Finnish long drink brand

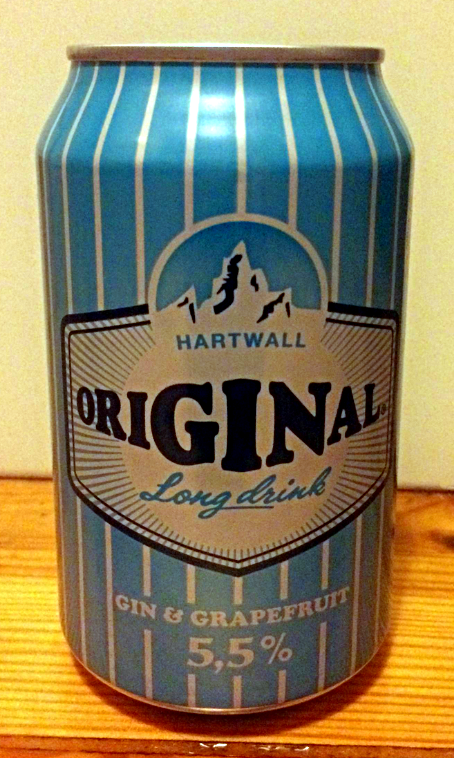
- Hartwall Original Long Drink.
- Type: Long drink
- Manufacturer: Hartwall
- Origin: Finland
- Introduced: 1952
- Alcohol by volume: 5.5% (standard), 2.6% (light), 7.5% (strong), alcohol-free
- Website: https://web.archive.org/web/20180630000157/http://www.originallongdrink.com/fi/

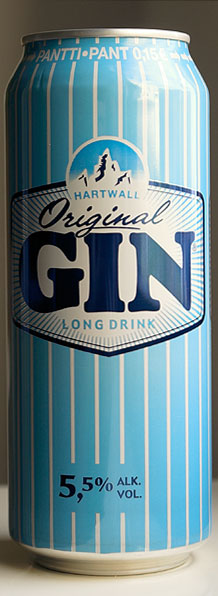
An earlier version of the Original Long Drink can.

Hartwall Original Long Drink (stylised as oriGINal) is a brand of long drink produced by the Finnish brewery Hartwall.

Hartwall first produced long drink in 1952 when Alko ordered Gin Long Drink and Brandy Long Drink from the brewery. Hartwall has sold lonkero under the Original Long Drink brand since 1995 when production of the beverage was opened for everyone. From 1979 to 1994 Gin Long Drink was produced for Alko by the breweries Mallasjuoma and Sinebrychoff. The beverage is still produced under the original recipe from Finnish gin, water and grapefruit juice. The gin is distilled specifically for the Hartwall Original Long Drink, and all its ingredients are picked by hand to ensure the best possible quality. The alcohol content of the beverage is 5.5% by volume, but there is also a lighter version with 2.6% alcohol, a Strong version with 7.5% alcohol and an alcohol-free version.

== History ==
Hartwall Original Long Drink was originally developed for the 1952 Summer Olympics in Helsinki, Finland to lighten the burden of the bar staff when Helsinki received visitors from all around the world. The original intent was to only produce the beverage during the Olympics, but as the beverage grew popular the customers demanded that its production should be continued even after the Olympics. At the same time a new beverage category for long drinks was born in Finland, colloquially called "lonkero" (from the words "long drink", literally meaning "tentacle" in Finnish). There originally were two flavours: Gin Long Drink made from gin and grapefruit lemonade and Brandy Long Drink made from brandy and Pommac. Production of Brandy Long Drink ended in the 1970s but the beverage came back onto the market produced by Laitilan Wirvoitusjuomatehdas in 2009.

Until 1995 grocery stores sold a lighter version with 2.6% alcohol, which was removed from the market when Finland joined the European Union. In 2016 the product came back onto the market, as the requirement that only fermented alcoholic beverages could be sold in grocery stores did not apply to beverages of under 2.8% alcohol.

== Different flavours ==
Hartwall Original Long Drink Flavours
Flavour	ABV (%)
Grapefruit	5.5
Grapefruit Light	4.5
Strawberry Light	4.5
Summer Mandarin	5.5
Peach Ice Tea	5.5
Pink Raspberry	5.5
Pineapple	5.5
Lemonade	5.5
Orange	5.5
Natural Blueberry	4.5
Natural Watermelon	4.5
Natural Passionfruit	4.5
Blueberry	5.5
Cranberry	5.5
Vodka & Lime	5.5
White Label Grapefruit	5.5
Black Label Brandy & Pommac	7.5
Black Label Cranberry	7.5
Black Label Grapefruit	7.5
Grapefruit 0%	0
Pineapple 0%	0
Pink Raspberry 0%	0
Zero Label Orange 0%	0
Original 2.6%	2.6
