= Greyhound (cocktail) =

Cocktail made with grapefruit juice and gin or vodka

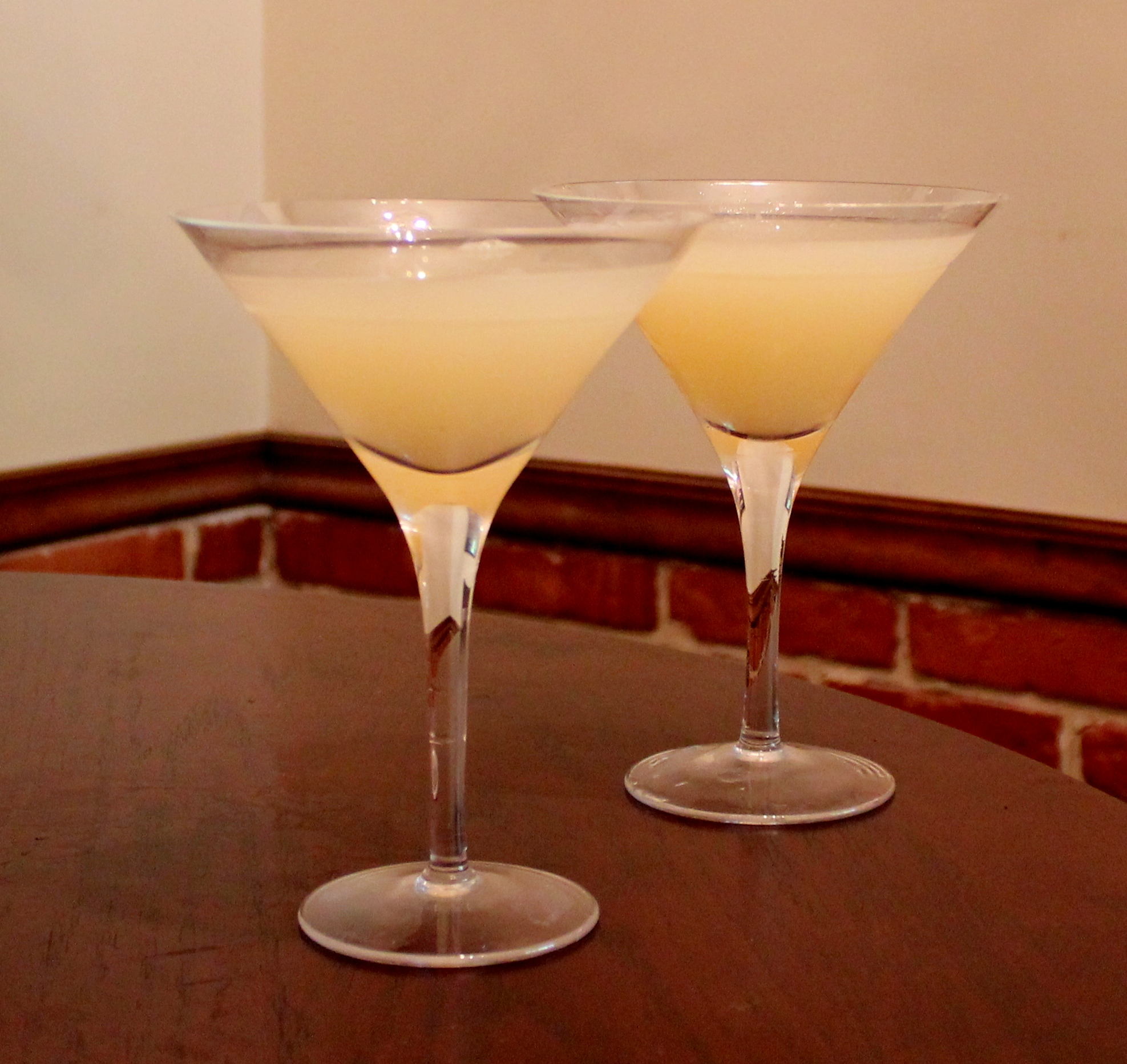
- Two greyhound cocktails
- Type: Highball
- Ingredients: 5 cl (1 parts) gin or vodka; 20 cl (4 parts) Grapefruit juice
- Base spirit: Gin
- Standard drinkware: Old fashioned glass
- Served: On the rocks: poured over ice
- Preparation: Shake gin or vodka and grapefruit juice in cocktail shaker. Strain into a highball glass.

A greyhound (or Amazone) is a cocktail consisting of grapefruit juice and gin or vodka mixed and served over ice. If the rim of the glass has been salted, the drink is instead called a salty dog.

== History ==
Harry Craddock's Savoy Cocktail Book from 1930 describes a "grapefruit cocktail" made with gin, grapefruit jelly, and ice. Craddock mentions that the cocktail is derived from similar cocktails. A recipe for a cocktail with the name "Greyhound" appears in Harper's Magazine in 1945: "The cocktails were made of gin, sugar, and canned grapefruit juice – a greyhound. This cocktail was served at Greyhound's restaurant chain, Post House, that was located at bus terminals."

After World War II, the recipe was more commonly made with vodka instead of gin.

== Garnish ==
For the greyhound, twist of lime or lemon.

== Variations ==
A salty dog has a salted rim on the glass.

Some similar cocktails use grapefruit soda instead of grapefruit juice. Examples include the Finnish Lonkero (ready-to-drink mix of grapefruit soda and gin) and the Mexican Paloma (grapefruit soda and tequila).

== See also ==
- List of cocktails
