= Happy Joe =

Finnish cider brand of Hartwall

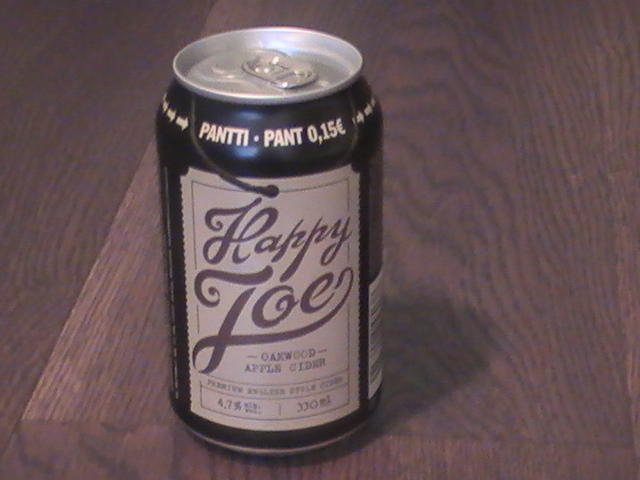
A can of Happy Joe Oakwood Apple.

Happy Joe is a Finnish brand of cider produced by Hartwall since September 2012.

Since the beginning, there have been three different flavours of Happy Joe cider, including Cloudy Apple, Dry Apple and Oakwood Apple. The cider has an alcohol content of 4.7 percent. The Cloudy Apple flavour is packaged in glass bottles, the other two in aluminium cans.

In 2016 Happy Joe was ranked Finland's third most popular brand of cider in the annual brand survey by Markkinointi & Mainonta and Taloustutkimus. Ahead of it were Crowmoor by Sinebrychoff and Somersby, behind it was Golden Cap by Sinebrychoff at the fourth place.

In spring 2016 the Happy Joe product line was expanded with two products, premium perry cider Crispy Pear (4.7%) and fully non-alcoholic apple cider Happy Joe Dry 0.0% Alcohol Free. Crispy Pear is packaged in both glass bottles and cans, Alcohol Free only in glass bottles.

In 2019 Rosé Apple (4.5%) was added to the Happy Joe product line.

In summer 2018 Hartwall brought a special batch of the Cloudy Apple cider called Gay Joe into the market in honour of Helsinki Pride, with another batch in 2019.
