= Paloma (cocktail) =

Tequila-based cocktail

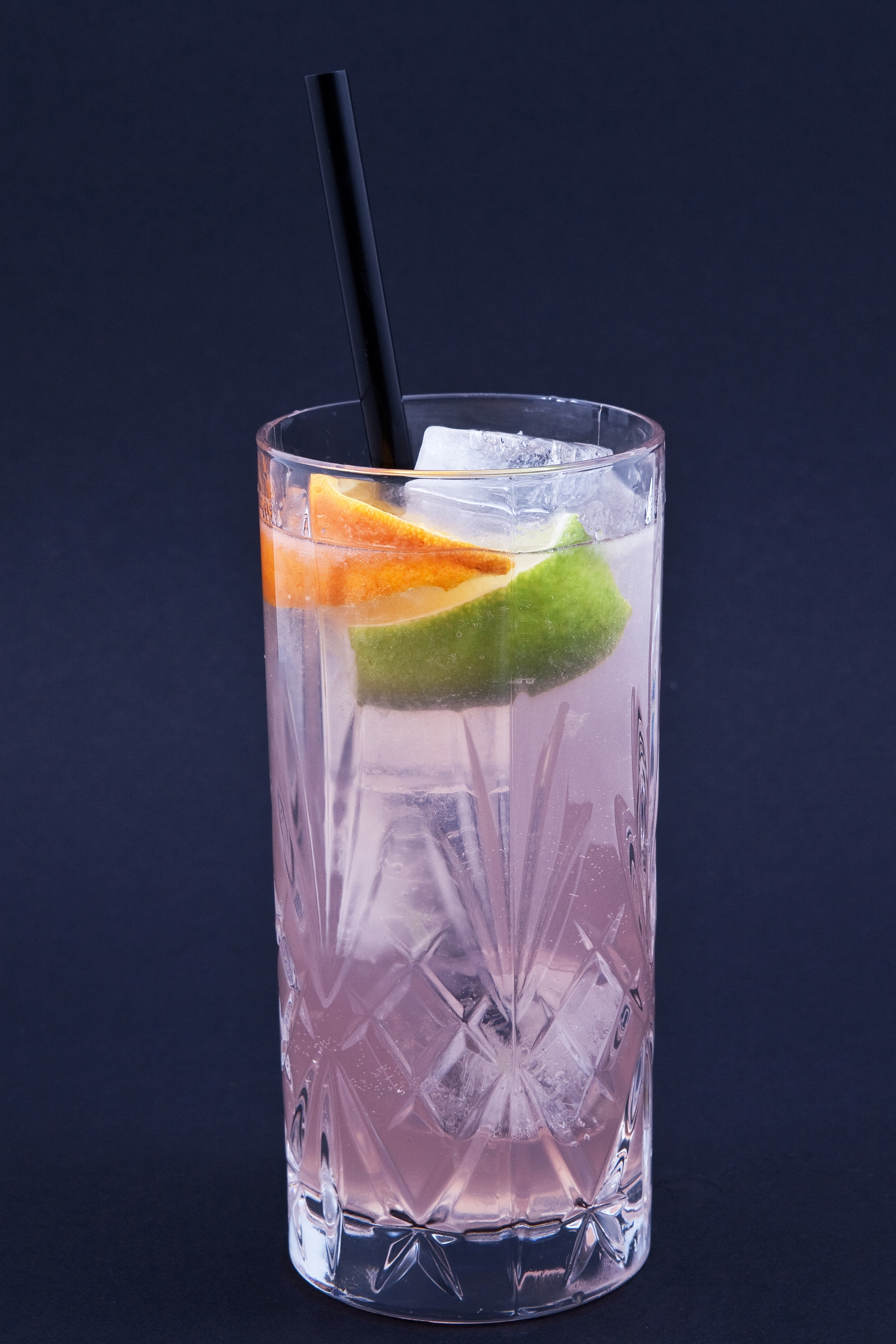
- Type: Cocktail
- Ingredients: 50 ml 100% agave tequila; 5 ml fresh lime juice; pinch of salt; 100 ml pink grapefruit soda
- Base spirit: Tequila
- Standard drinkware: Highball glass
- Standard garnish: slice of lime
- Served: On the rocks: poured over ice
- Preparation: Pour the tequila into a highball glass, squeeze the lime juice. Add ice and salt, fill up pink grapefruit soda. Stir gently.

The paloma (Spanish for "dove") is a tequila-based cocktail. This drink is most commonly prepared by mixing tequila, lime juice, and a grapefruit-flavored soda such as Fresca, Squirt, or Jarritos and served with ice and a lime wedge. Adding salt to the rim of the glass is also an option.

Alternatively, the grapefruit soda can be replaced with fresh white or red grapefruit juice (jugo de toronja) and club soda.

== Cocktail variations ==
A simple paloma is a two-ingredient cocktail consisting only of tequila and grapefruit-flavored soda. A more complex variant of the Paloma is the cantarito, which in addition to lime juice, also has lemon juice and orange juice. In Mexico paloma is made with Squirt brand soda or Jarritos.

The paloma is considered by some to be more flavorful than its closest relative, the greyhound. Some assume the name of the cocktail comes from the Spanish for "dove", but others suspect the name comes from a derivation of the word pomelo, which is the Spanish for "grapefruit".

== See also ==
- Lonkero
- List of cocktails
