= Veikkaus Arena =

Multiuse indoor arena in Finland

- Helsingin areena, Helsingforsarenan
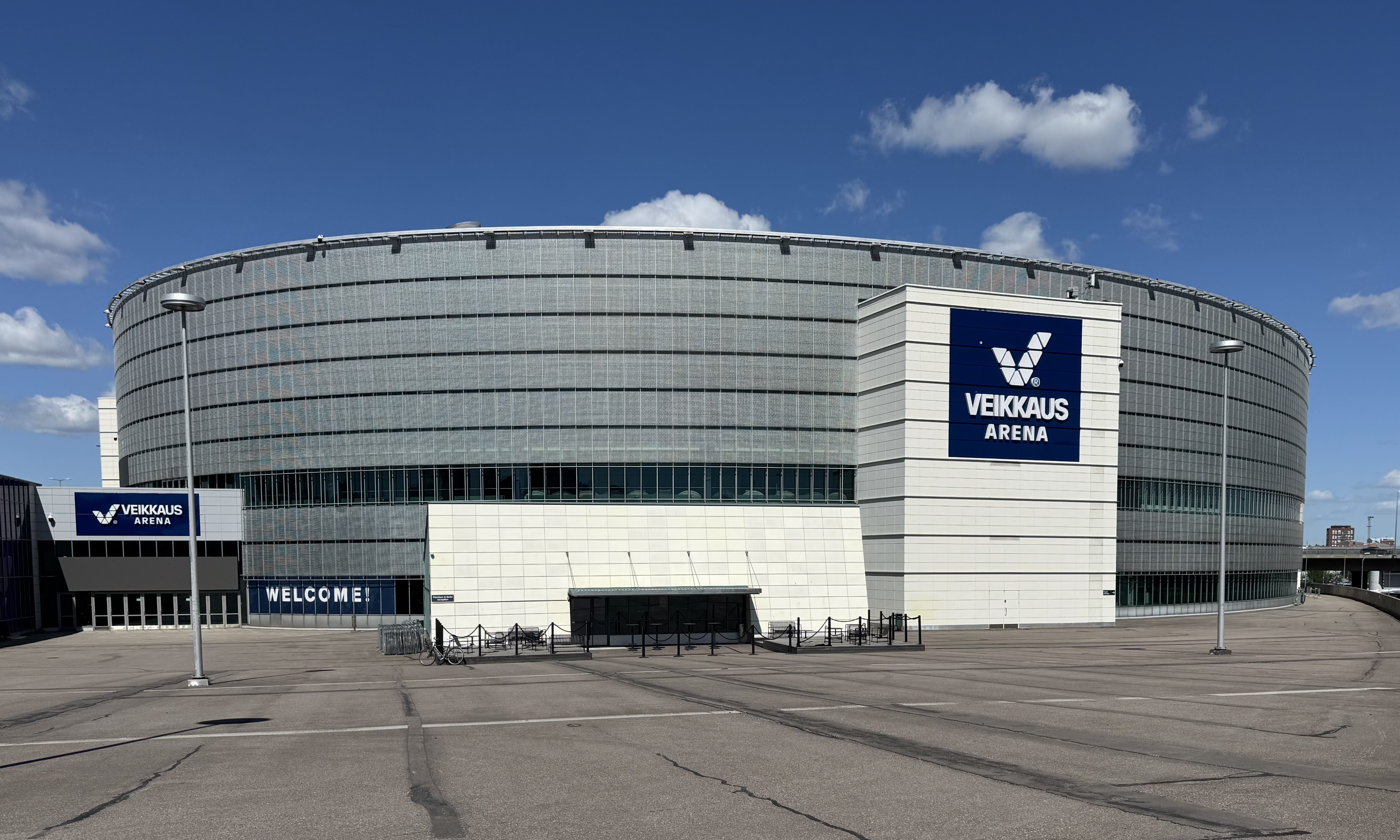
- Veikkaus Arena in 2026
- Interactive map of Veikkaus Arena
- Former names: Hartwall Areena (1997–2014); Hartwall Arena (2014–2022); Helsinki Halli (2022–2025)
- Address: Areenankuja 1, Helsinki
- Location: Helsinki, Finland
- Coordinates: 60°12′20.66″N 24°55′44.03″E
- Owner: Trevian Kasvu LP Ky (Reima Södervall, Heikki Viitikko)
- Capacity: 14,000 (basketball); 13,349 (ice hockey); 7,500–15,000 (concerts); 3,000–5,000 (amphitheater)
- Surface: Versatile

Construction
- Groundbreaking: 2 April 1996
- Opened: 19 April 1997
- Renovated: 2015
- Closed: 2 March 2022
- Reopened: October 2025
- Cost: 300,000,000 mk (69,000,000 in 2018 euros)
- Architect: SCI Architects
- Project manager: Harry Harkimo
- Main contractor: Skanska

Tenant
- Jokerit (1997–2022, 2025–present)

Website
- https://www.veikkausarena.fi/

Veikkaus Arena (formerly Hartwall Areena and Hartwall Arena) is a large multi-functional indoor arena located in Helsinki, Finland that is the home of Jokerit. It was opened in April 1997 and is convertible for various events. The total seated capacity during ice hockey games is 13,349 (about 14,000 for basketball, for concerts up to 15,000) and as an amphitheatre, it is significantly reduced to between 3,000 and 5,000.

Formerly under Russian ownership, it was closed in 2022 and left unused for over three years due to EU sanctions related to the Russian invasion of Ukraine. The main sponsor, Hartwall, also ended its sponsorship and the arena's name was changed. In February 2025, the sale of the facility to new owners was concluded, with the arena scheduled to re-open in April or May. In July 2025, the arena's new sponsor name was announced as Veikkaus Arena.

== Construction and facilities ==
The initiative for building the arena came from Harry "Hjallis" Harkimo in 1994. It was built to be ready for the Ice Hockey World Championships in 1997, and was delivered by the constructor on 11 April 1997. The building is elliptical, 153 metres long and 123 metres wide. It also has a practice arena 37 metres underground, used by many hockey teams. It is connected to a multi-storey carpark, which has a total capacity of 1,421 vehicles.

The arena is situated next to Pasila railway station, which is the second busiest railway station in Finland, 3.5 km north of Helsinki Central Station.

== Other and former names ==
The national broadcaster Yle calls the arena "Helsingin areena" or "Helsingforsarenan" ("the Helsinki Arena" in Finnish and Swedish). The newspaper Helsingin Sanomat calls it "Helsinki-areena".

It was branded as "Hartwall Areena" from its opening until 2014, and as "Hartwall Arena" thereafter until 2 March 2022. The beverage company Hartwall, also based in Helsinki, was its largest sponsor, and thus got the naming rights. Hartwall ended its sponsorship in March 2022, to avoid association with the Russian then-owners of the arena, Roman Rotenberg and Gennady Timchenko, in the wake of the Russian invasion of Ukraine. In September 2024, the Finnish government announced that it would spend €200,000 on drafting a law that would allow the seizure of the arena from Rotenberg and Timchenko. That November, Rotenberg and Timchenko sold their ownership of the arena to Finnish real estate investment company Trevian, with its CEO Reima Södervall along with Heikki Viitikko planning to have the venue reopened by early 2025. In February 2025, the deal was finalised, with the facility reopening in October.

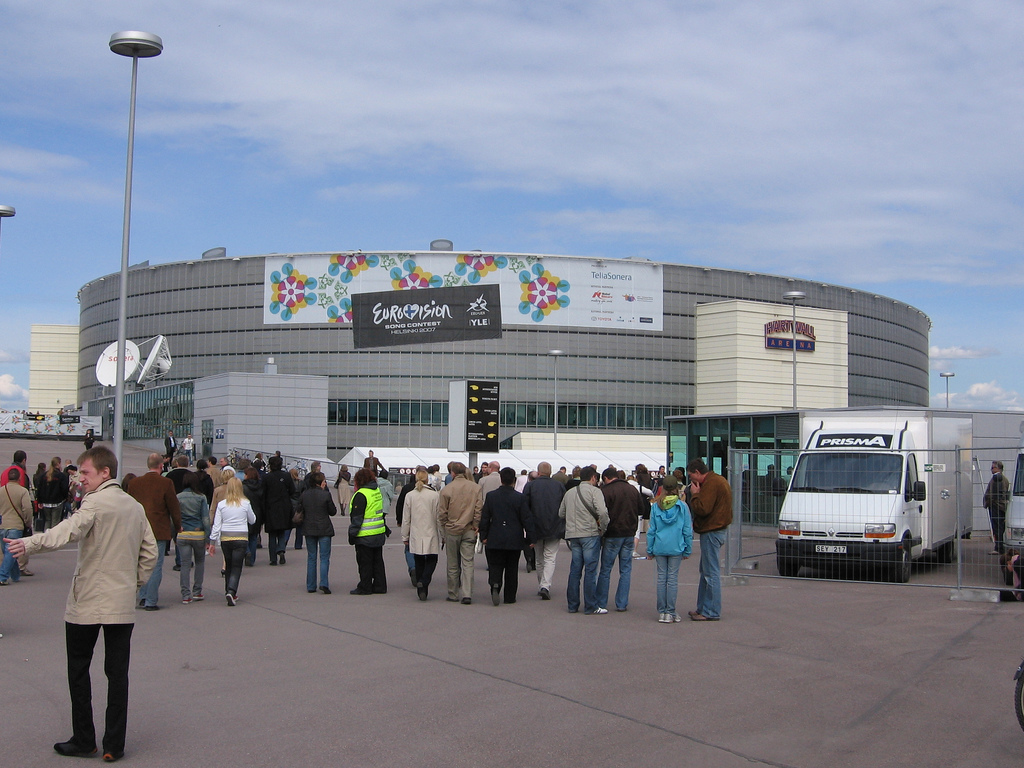
Hartwall Areena in 2007

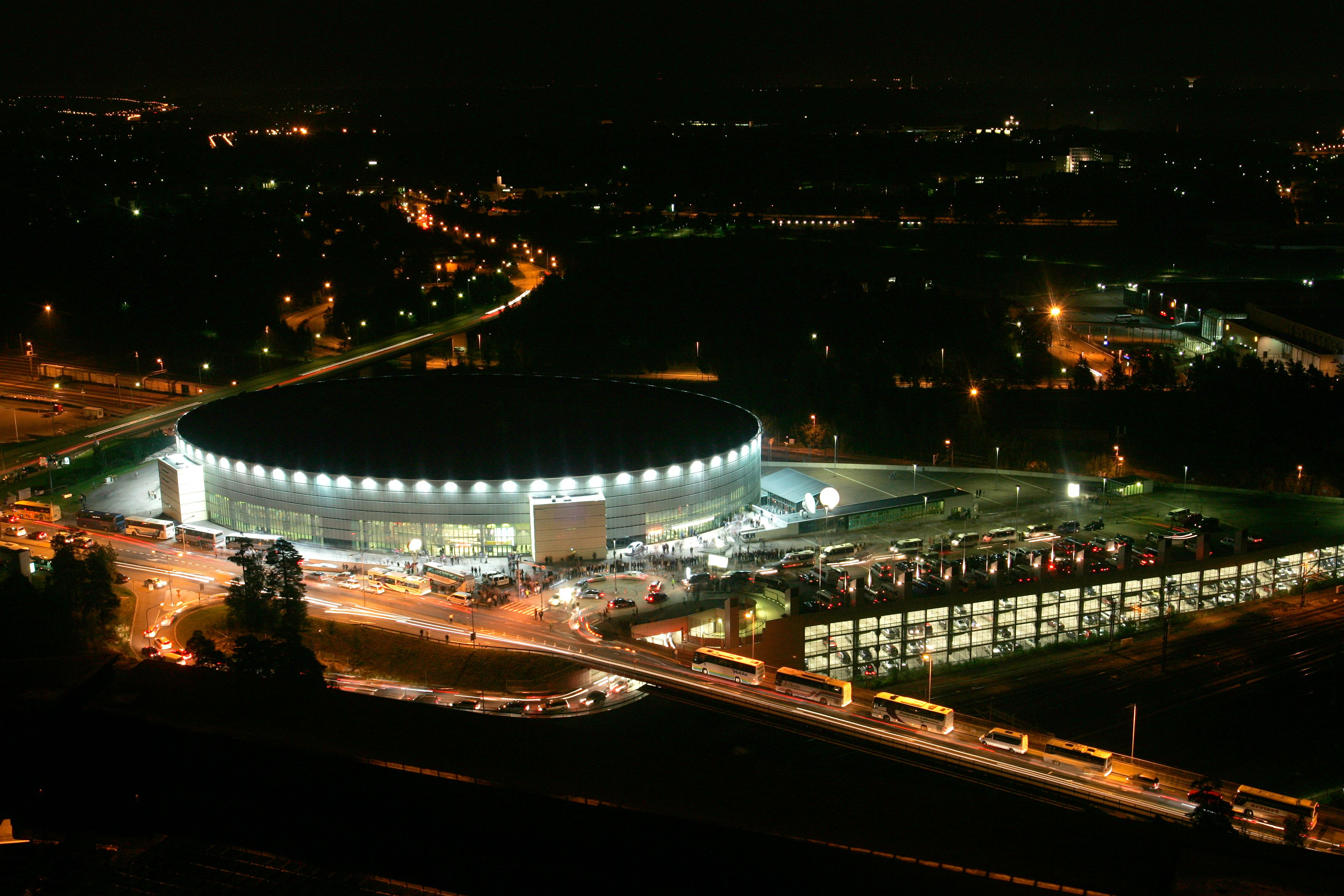
Helsinki Arena at night

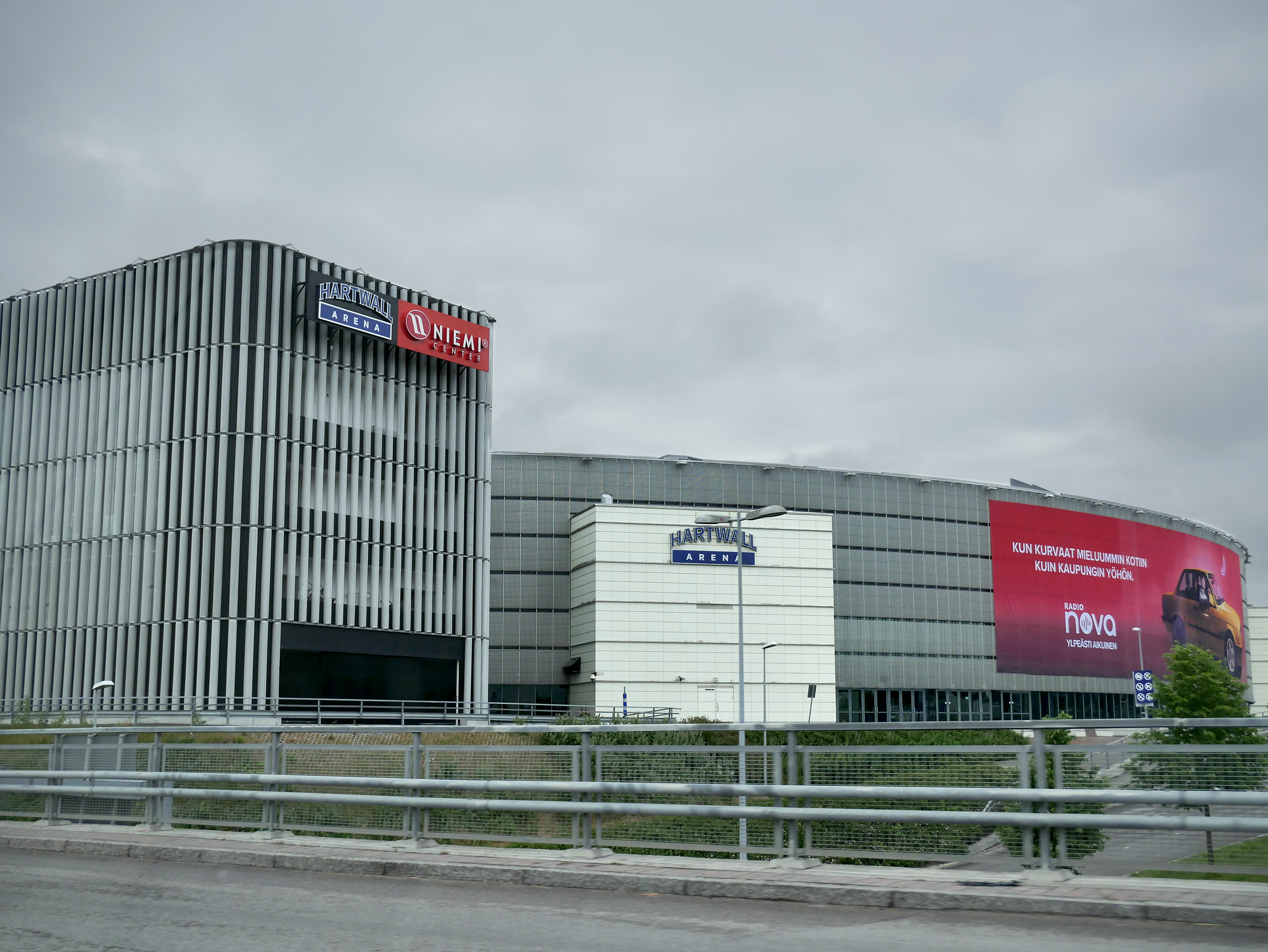
Hartwall Arena in 2018

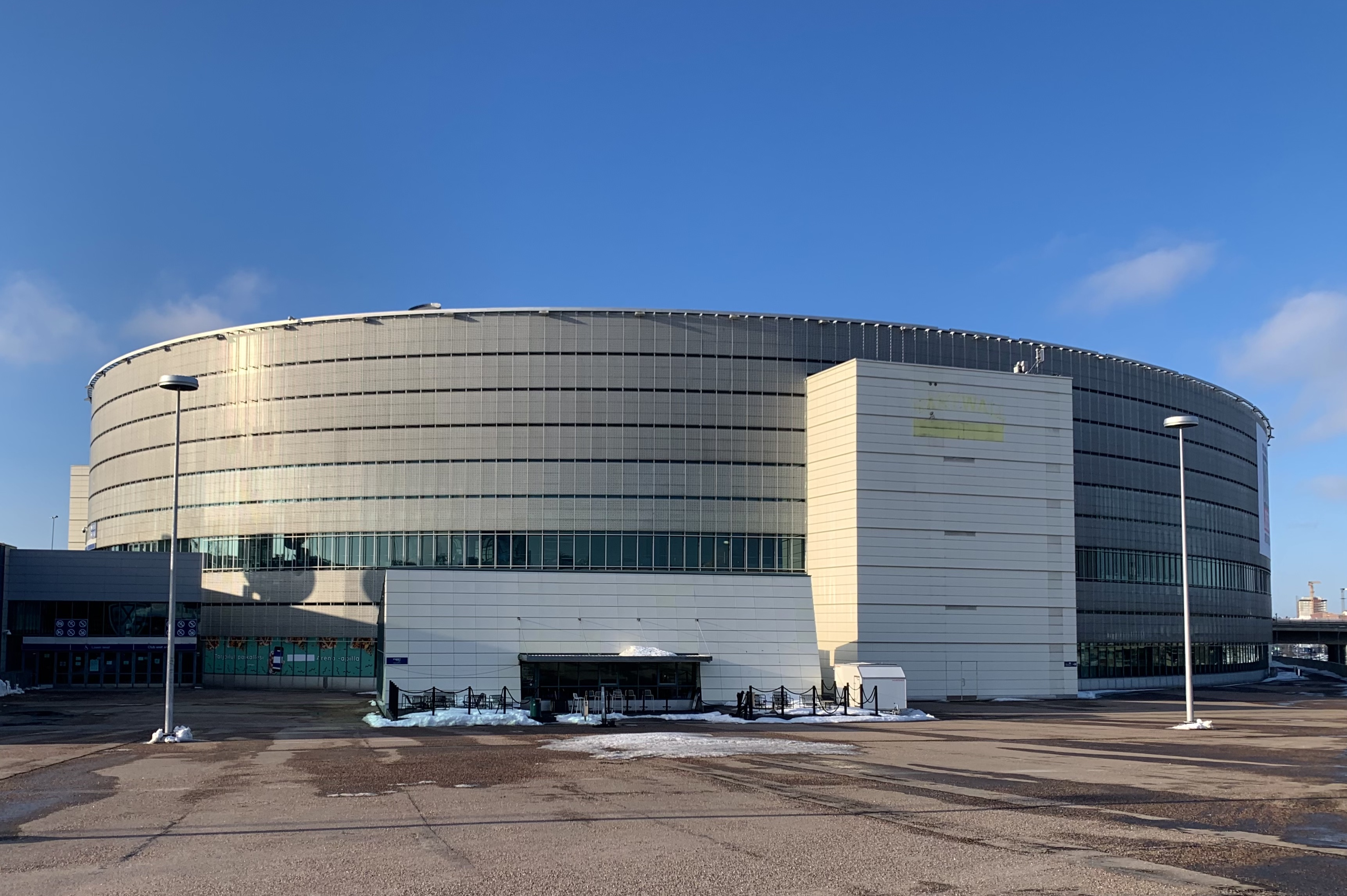
Helsinki Arena in 2022

== Events ==
=== Sports ===
The arena was the home venue of the ice hockey team Jokerit from 1997 to 2022, then became their home again in 2025, initially for a handful of games at the arena during their time in Mestis before their full time return to the arena when they received their Liiga licence in 2026.

The arena has also been used for Ice Hockey World Championships, World Figure Skating Championships, NHL Challenge, and World Cup of Hockey. On 2 October 2009, the NHL opened its season in the arena with a matchup between the Chicago Blackhawks and the Florida Panthers, making it the first NHL game to be held in Finland. In May 2011, the arena served as the main venue of the 2012 IIHF World Championship. It hosted all Group A games and quarterfinals, all semifinals and the bronze and gold medal games. Group B games and quarterfinals were hosted in Ericsson Globe, Stockholm. It also co-hosted the 2013 IIHF World Championship with Ericsson Globe, but in 2013 all games after quarterfinals were played in Stockholm.

The arena was one of the host venues of the 2016 World Junior Ice Hockey Championships. Its assignment included hosting the gold-medal game, in which Kasperi Kapanen scored an Overtime goal to win Gold for Finland on home ice.

One of the group stages of EuroBasket 2017, was also played at the arena.

The arena hosted two 2018–19 regular season NHL games between the Winnipeg Jets and Florida Panthers on Thursday, 1 November 2018 and Friday, 2 November 2018 as part of the 2018 NHL Global Series. The NHL Global Series would return in 2026 for two games on 12 November 2026 and 14 November 2026 between the Seattle Kraken and Carolina Hurricanes.

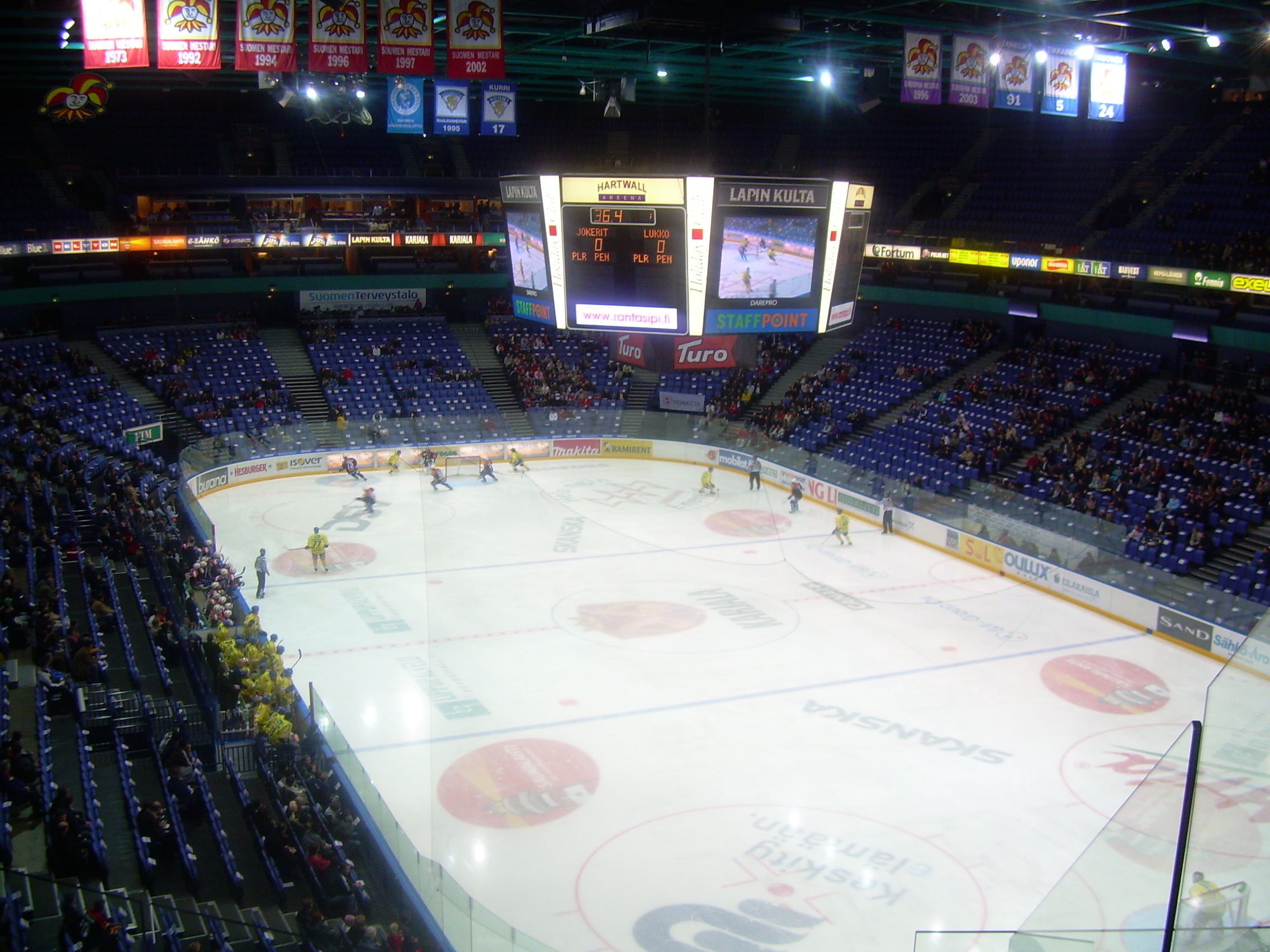
Jokerit vs Rauman Lukko in 2007

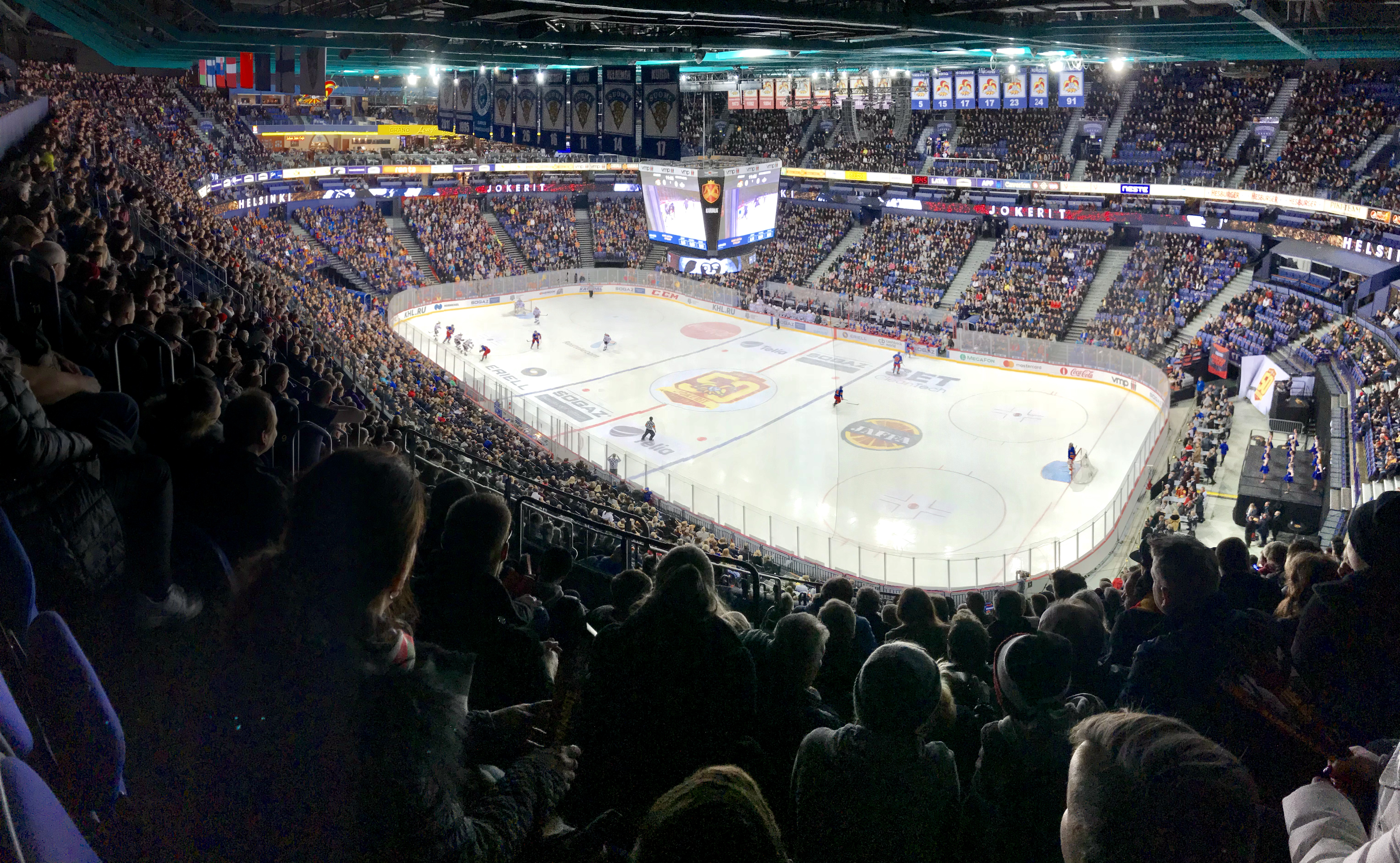
Jokerit vs Dinamo Riga in 2018

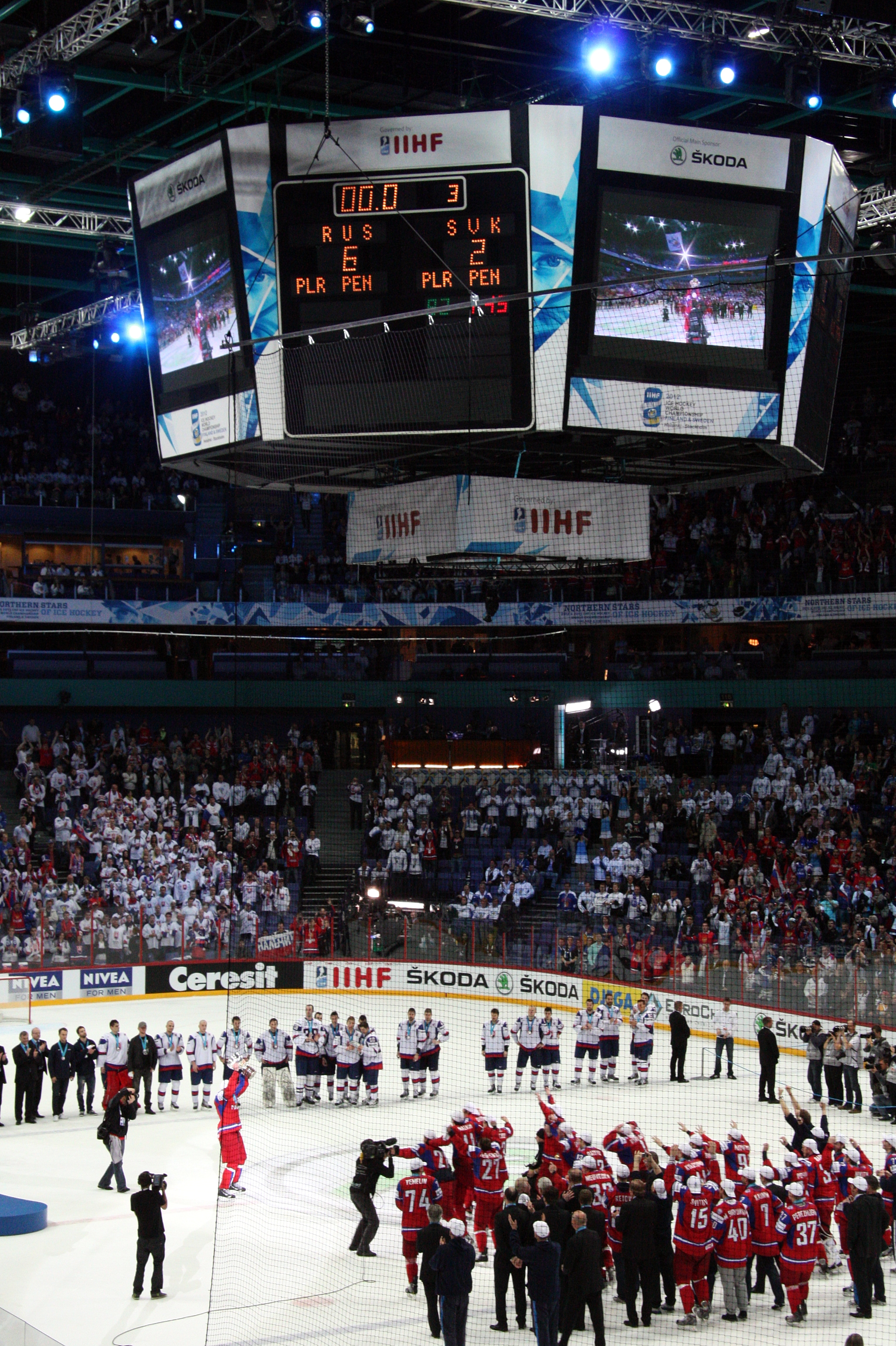
2012 IIHF World Championship Final

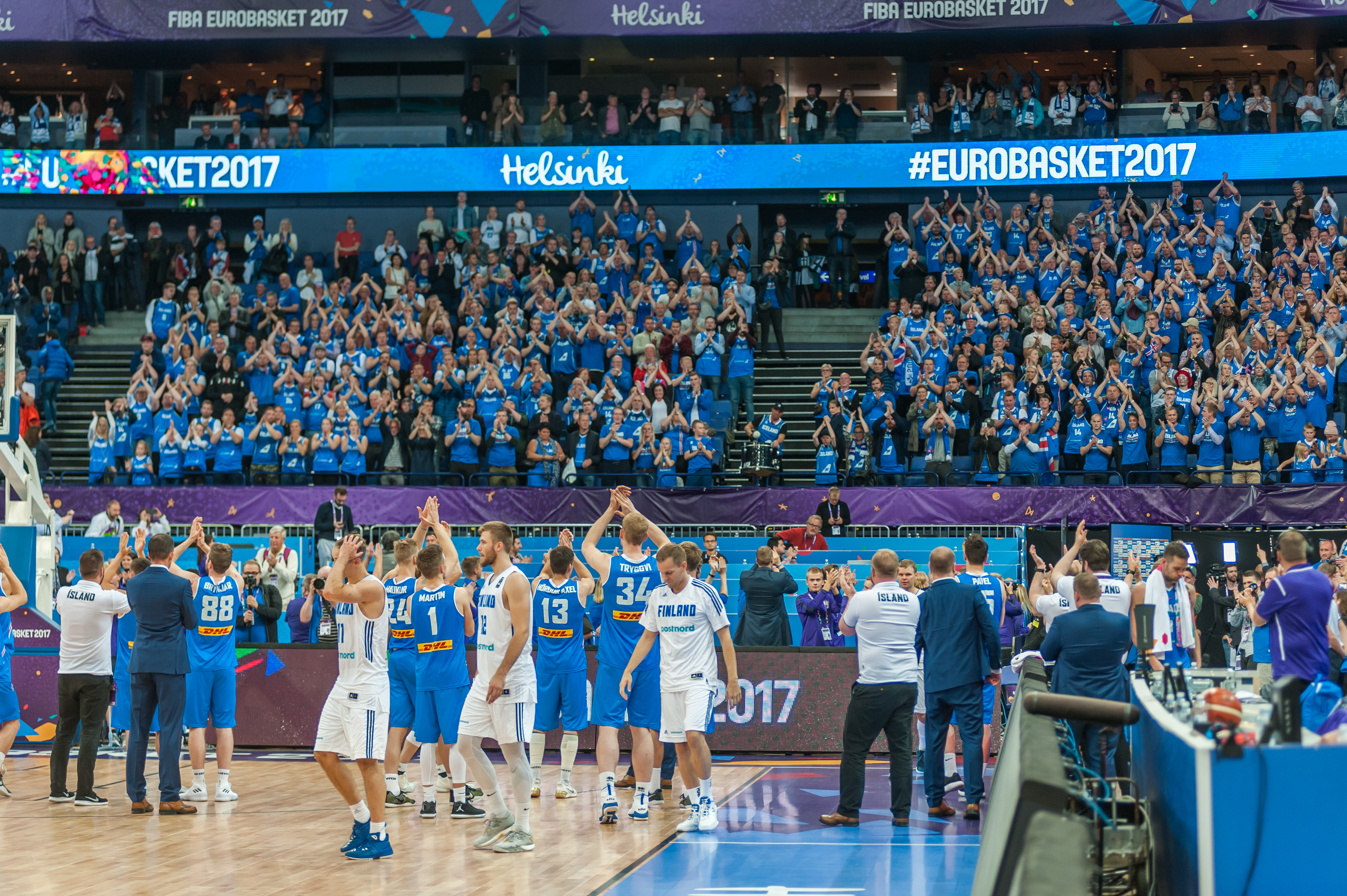
EuroBasket 2017, Finland vs Iceland

== See also ==
- List of indoor arenas in Finland
- List of indoor arenas in Nordic countries
- List of European ice hockey arenas

Events and tenants
Preceded by Helsingin jäähalli	Jokerit; Home arena 1997–present	Succeeded by Current
Preceded by Olympic Indoor Hall; Athens	Eurovision Song Contest; Venue; 2007	Succeeded by Belgrade Arena; Belgrade
