= Cantarito =

Cocktail

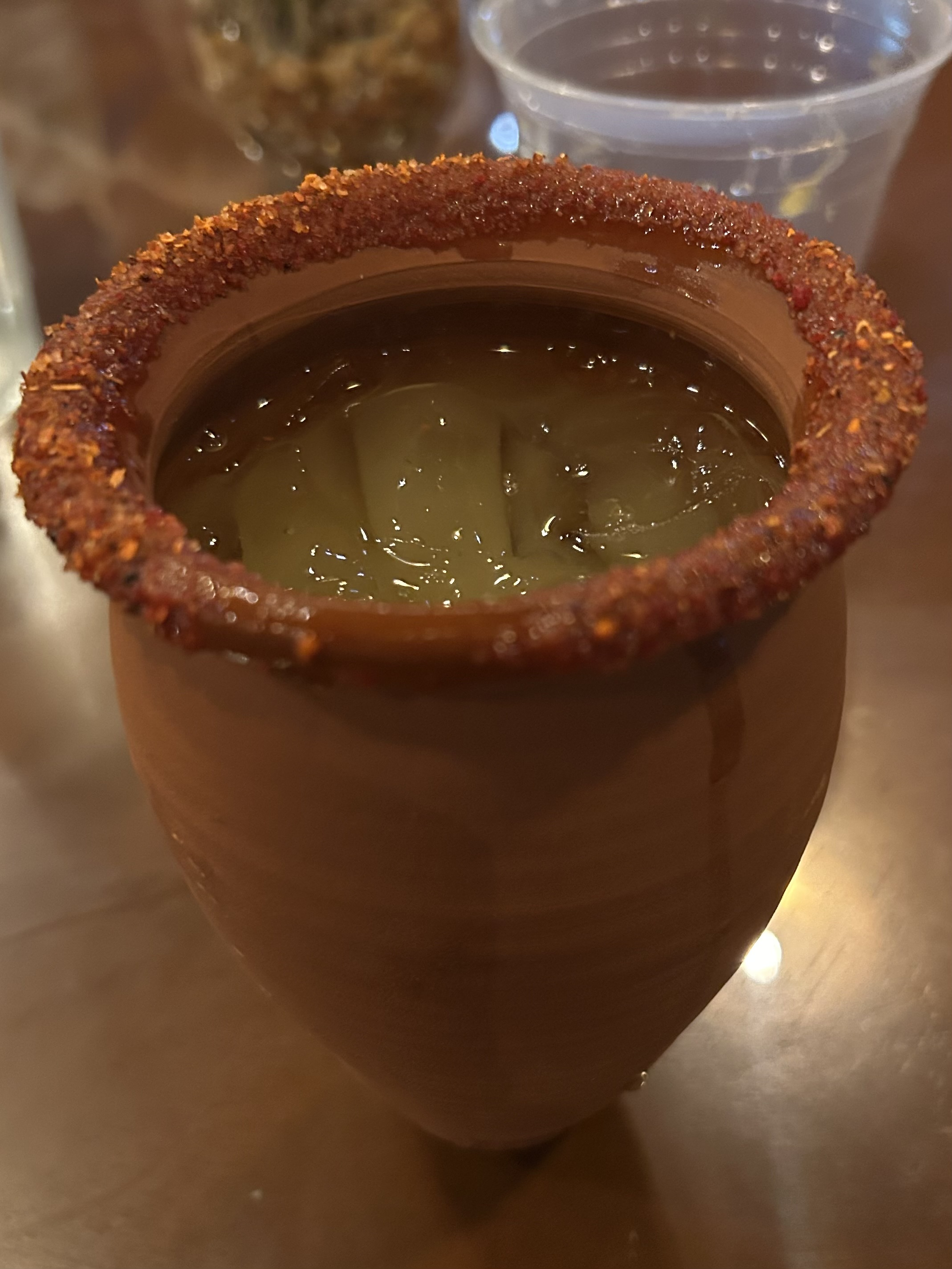
- Type: Mixed drink
- Ingredients: 60 mL Tequila; 60 mL Orange Juice; 30 mL Grapefruit Juice; 22.5 mL Lime Juice; Dash of Grapefruit Soda; Pinch of Salt
- Standard drinkware: clay pot
- Standard garnish: lime wedge and grapefruit wedge
- Preparation: except grapefruit soda, combine other ingredients in cocktail shaker; shake with ice; pour into clay mug or high ball glass; top by pouring grapefruit soda into the mug/glass; garnish with lime wedge and grapefruit wedge

A cantarito is a tequila-based highball, paloma-like cocktail, with more ingredients: orange juice, lemon juice, and lime juice, served in a clay cup known as a jarrito de barro that helps keep the drink cold. It can contain ingredients such as lemon juice, lime juice, grapefruit juice, orange juice, sea salt, and grapefruit soda.
