= Erik Bruun =

Finnish graphic designer (born 1926)

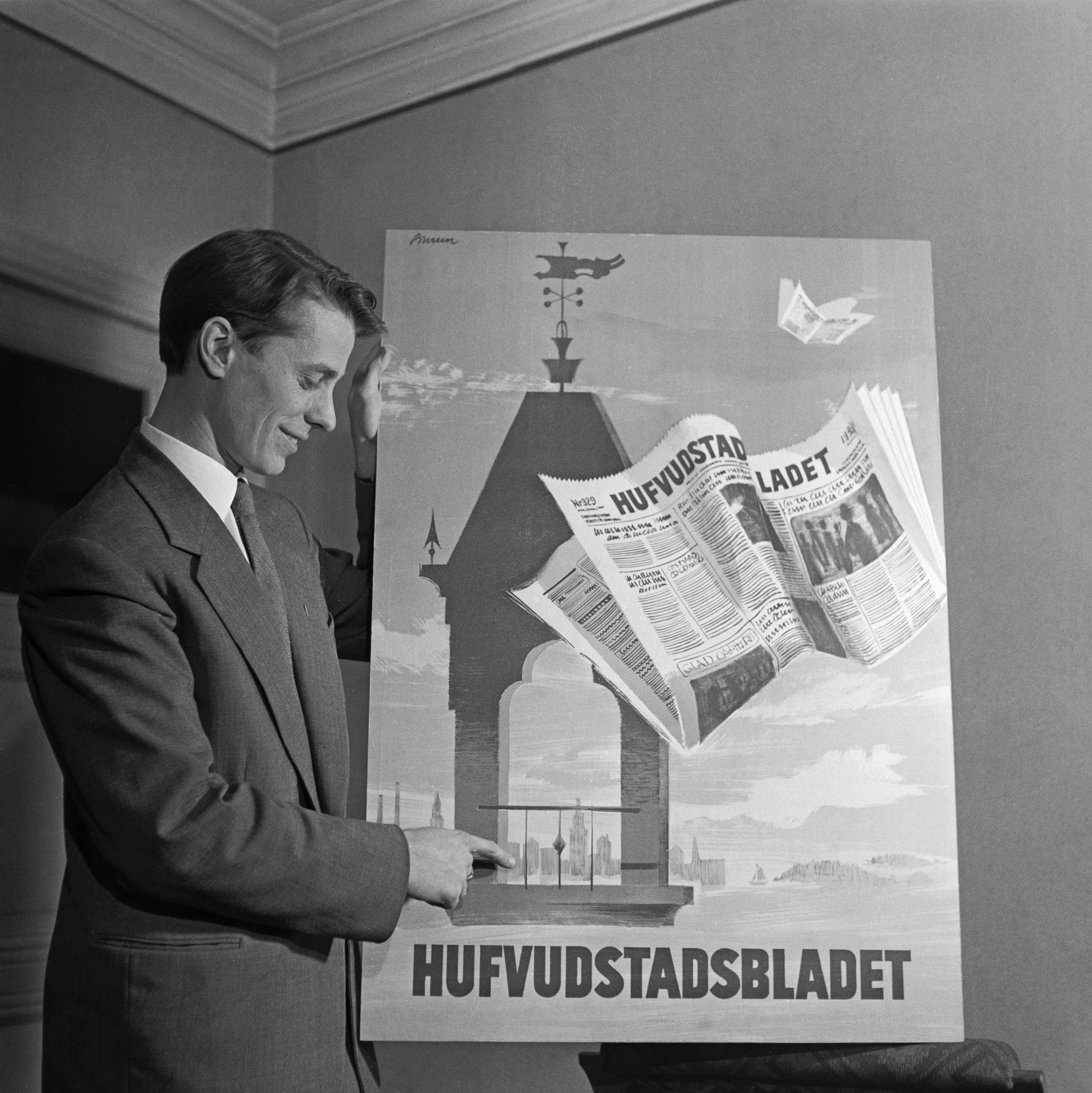
Erik Bruun in 1954 with a poster for the Hufvudstadsbladet newspaper.

Rolf Erik von Bruun (born 7 April 1926) is a Finnish graphic designer whose works include the reverse sides of the 1986 Finnish Markka banknote series.

== Life and career ==
Bruun was born in Viipuri, Finland, on 7 April 1926. He spent his childhood in the village of Säiniö on the Karelian isthmus. In the war years his family was forced to move to Helsinki, where he later enrolled in the Central School of Industrial Design. He graduated as a graphics designer in 1950.

After graduation, Bruun worked for three years as an exhibition designer and advertisement artist. In 1953 he founded his own design studio, where he produced the most of his work.

Bruun's works are diverse and numerous. They include posters, postcards, stamps, and most notably all of the reverse sides of the last ever series of the Finnish Markka banknote series from year 1986. In the early days of the new banknote series, Bruun and his wife were visiting Stockholm, Sweden. They needed to exchange Finnish Markka notes to Swedish krona, and had some of the new Markka notes with them. The cashier, never having seen the new notes before, asked if they were genuine. "Of course they are", replied Bruun's wife, "my husband drew them himself!"

In his work, Bruun mostly features the Finnish nature in all its richness and beauty. Particularly prominent motives include the marine eagle, the Saimaa seal and the bear. The Saimaa seal is the symbol of the Finnish nature preservation association, whose 1974 logo Bruun designed.

His posters and designs for the soft drink brand Hartwall Jaffa are also famous.

Bruun also submitted a proposal for the design of the Euro banknotes, featuring various kinds of animals. This proposal was rejected in favour of Robert Kalina's proposal featuring European architecture.

On 7 April 2026, he turned 100, and his work was celebrated in a series of five postage stamps in Finland.
