= Jaffa (drink) =

Soft drink produced in Finland

- Logo of Jaffa, originating from an advertisement poster by Erik Bruun in 1959.
- Manufacturer: Hartwall
- Origin: Finland
- Introduced: 1949; 77 years ago in Finland.
- Website: jaffa.fi

Jaffa is a carbonated orange-flavoured soft drink created and produced by Hartwall in Finland. Although the drink is primarily orange-flavoured, there exists 13 different flavours today.

The brand is also notable for the numerous popular posters and designs created for it by graphic designer Erik Bruun.

== History ==
Jaffa was first introduced in 1949 with an orange-flavoured drink. Currently Hartwall Jaffa is the third best-selling soft drink in Finland after internationally sold cola beverages such as Coca-Cola.

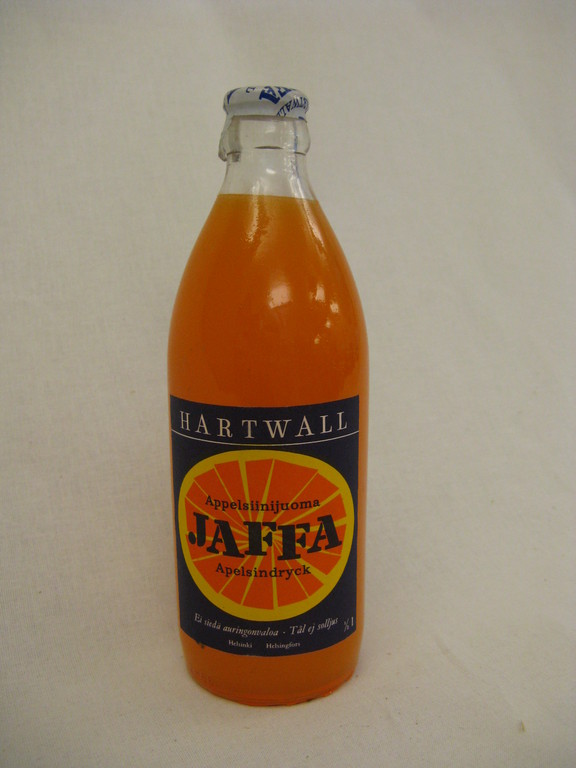
The older type of a bottle of Hartwall Jaffa, 1960s/1970s

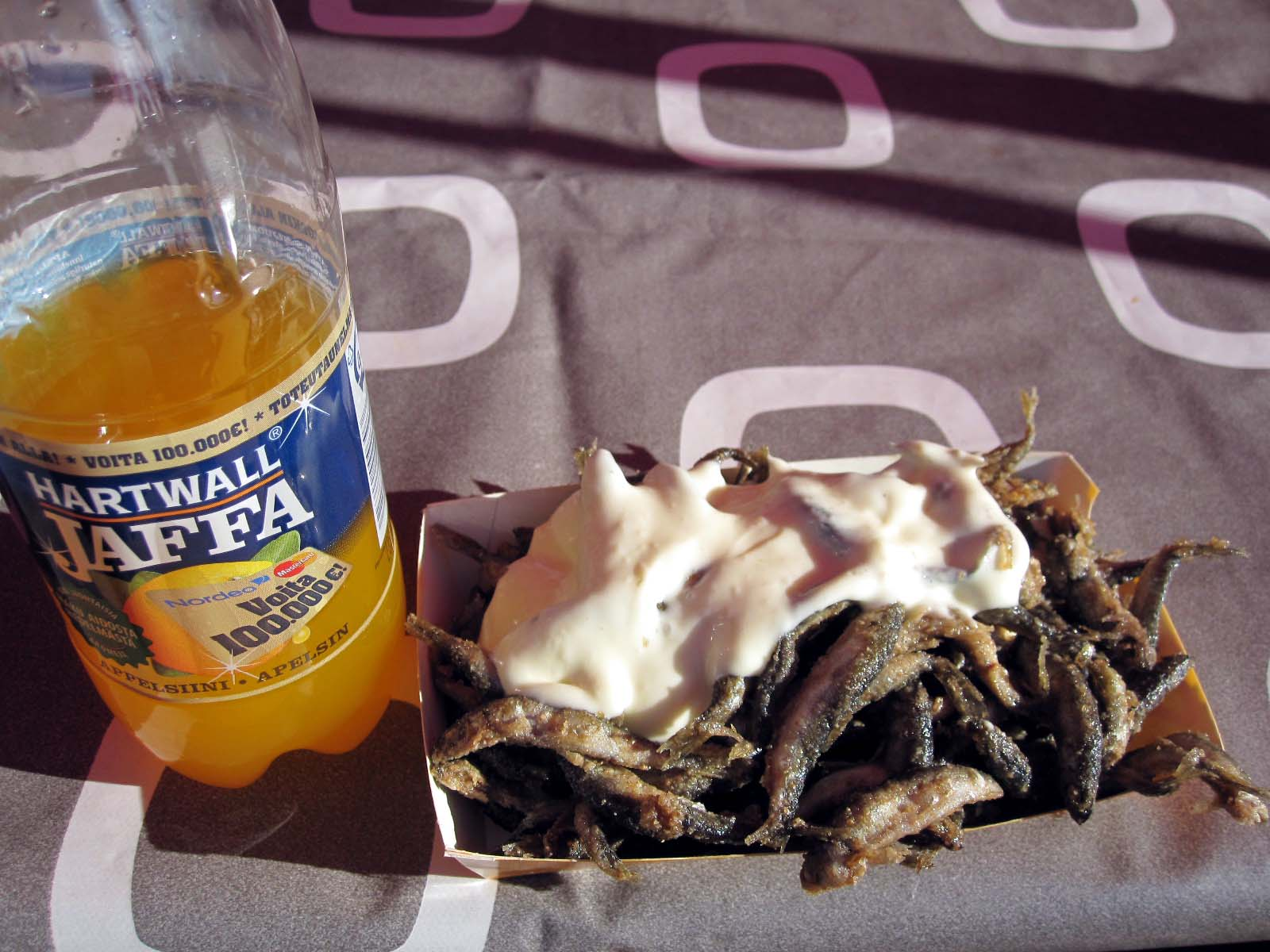
Hartwall Jaffa bottle with an earlier label with Fried vendace

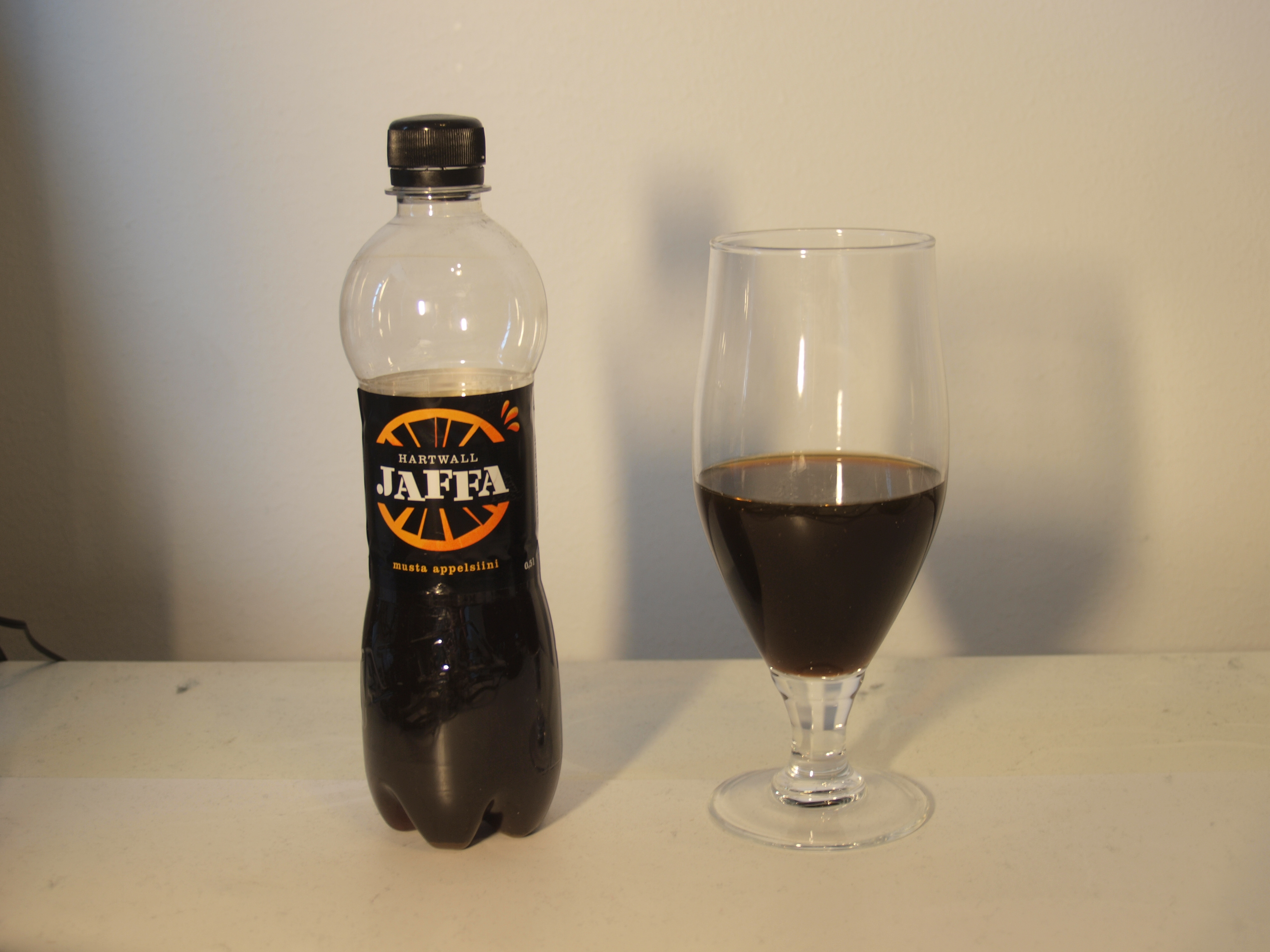
Hartwall Jaffa Musta Appelsiini (Black orange)

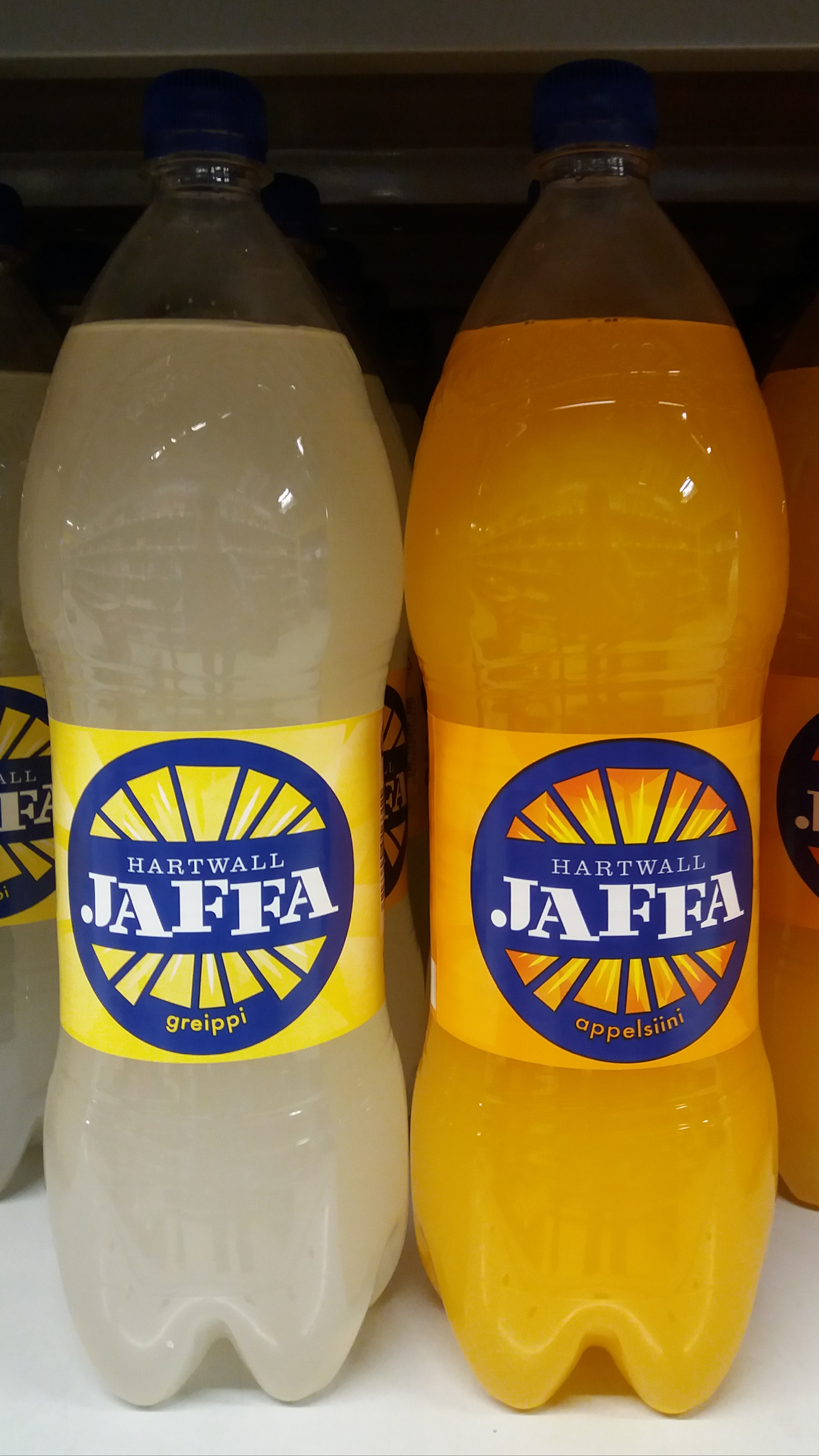
Hartwall Jaffa Greippi & Appelsiini

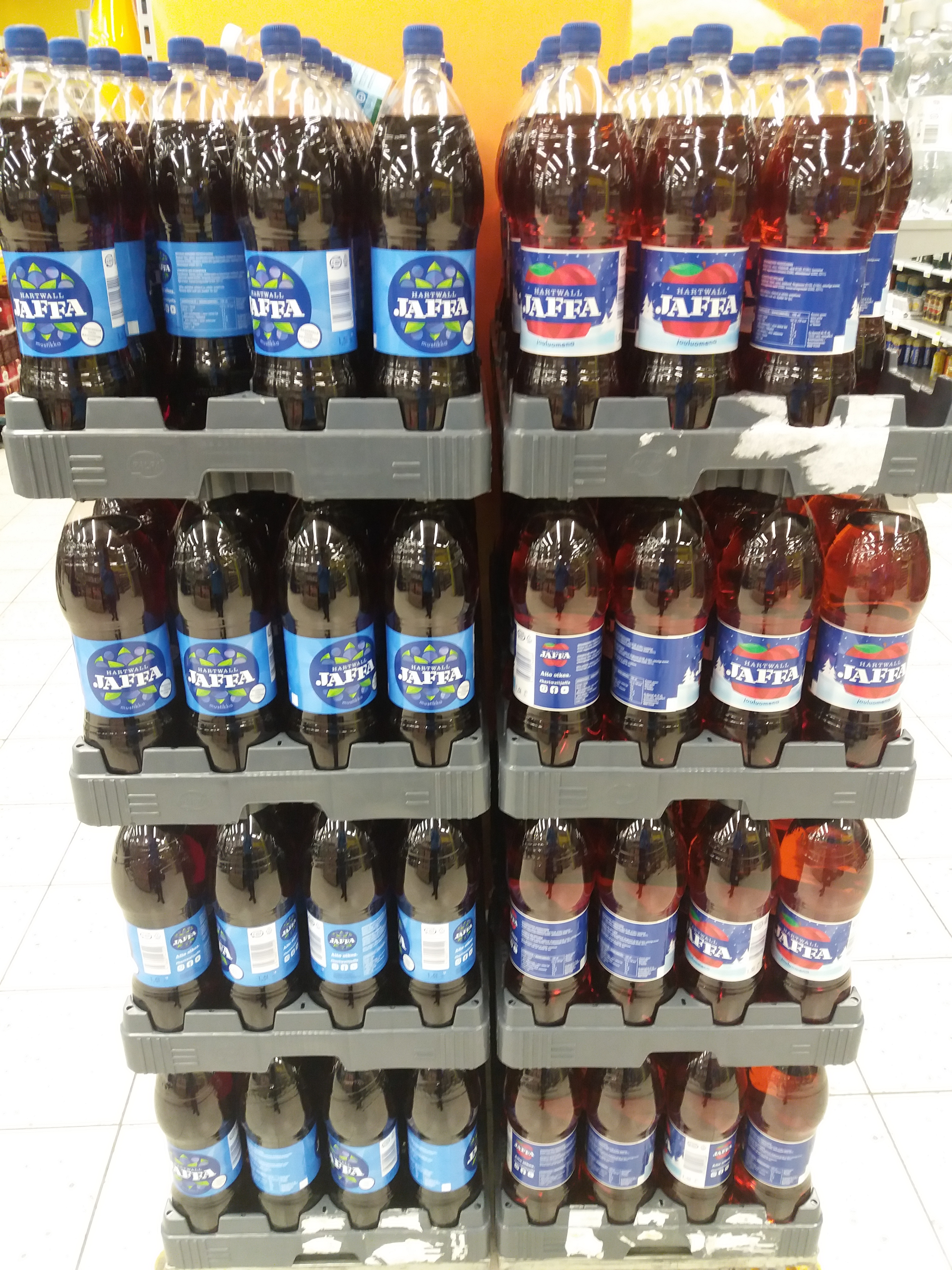
Hartwall Jaffa Mustikka (blueberry) and Jouluomena (Christmas apple)

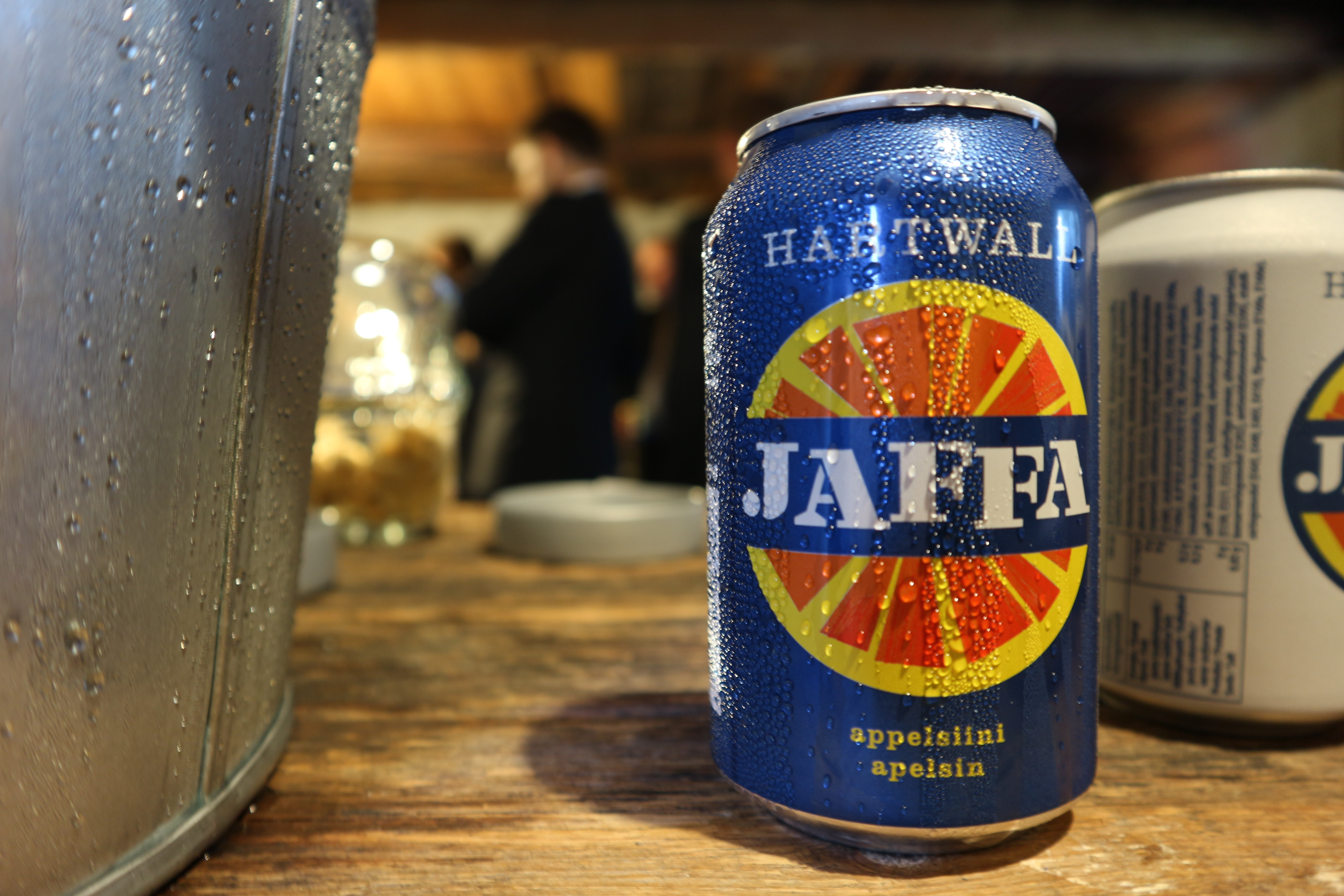
Hartwall Jaffa in a can
