= Salty dog (cocktail) =

Cocktail of gin or vodka and grapefruit juice

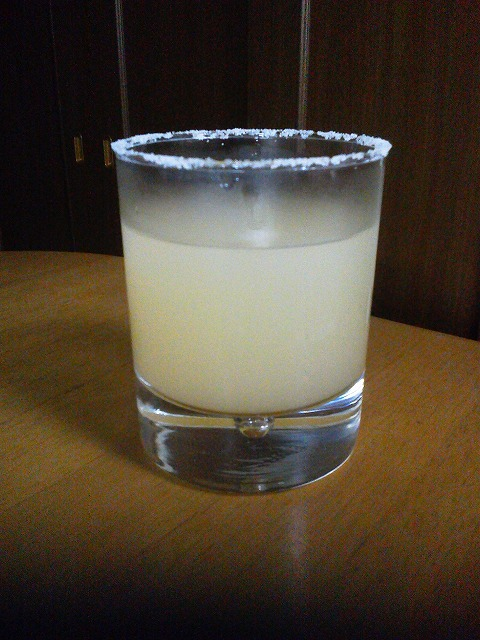
- Type: Cocktail
- Ingredients: 2 oz gin or vodka; 4 oz grapefruit juice
- Base spirit: Gin, Vodka
- Standard drinkware: Highball glass
- Standard garnish: Salted glass
- Served: Rocks
- Preparation: Combine ingredients and serve in a salt-rimmed glass.

A salty dog is a cocktail made with gin or vodka and grapefruit juice, served in a highball glass with a salted rim. The salt distinguishes it from the related greyhound. It is traditionally made with gin and is believed to date back to the 1920s.

Most modern recipes call for about one part gin or vodka to two parts grapefruit juice, served in a salt-rimmed glass.

== In popular culture ==
The salty dog is a favorite drink of Artie (the producer played by Rip Torn) on the sitcom The Larry Sanders Show. Artie made it with vodka. It also appears in the 5th episode of the anime Botan Kamiina Fully Blossoms When Drunk.

== See also ==
- List of cocktails
