= Crowmoor =

Finnish cider brand

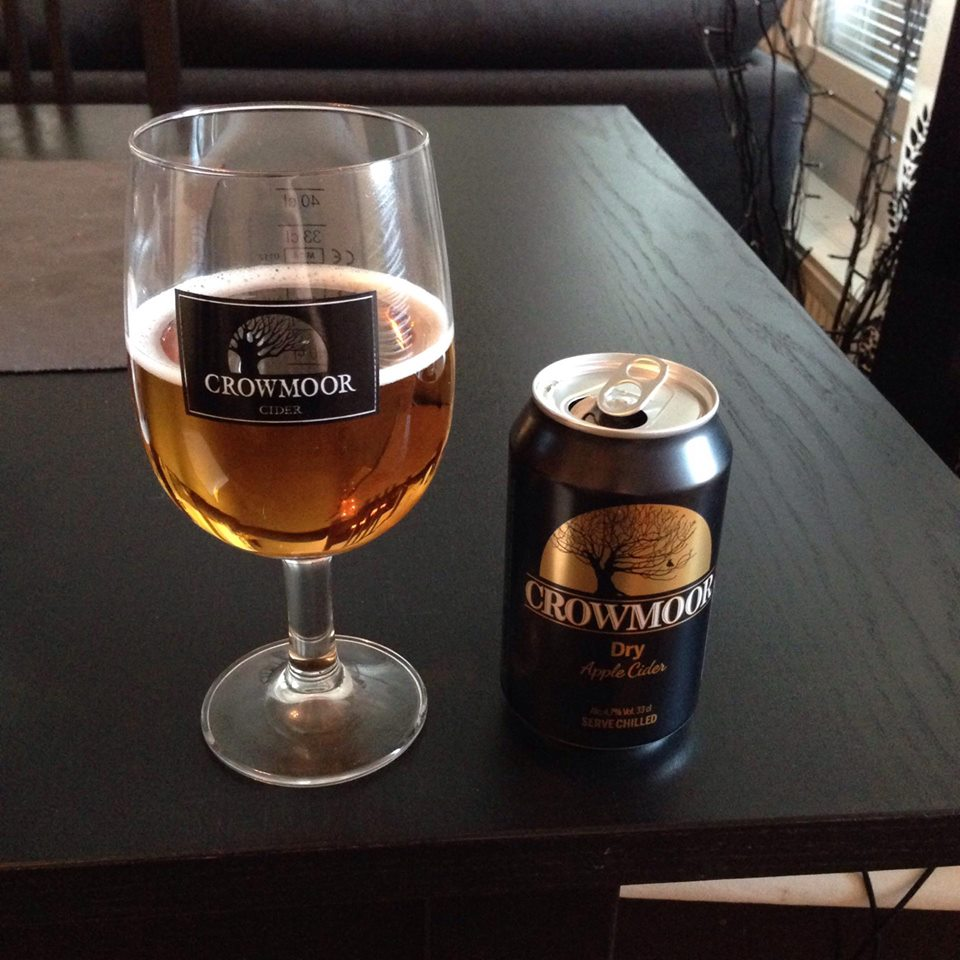
Crowmoor cider poured into a glass.

Crowmoor is a Finnish brand of dry English-type cider produced by Sinebrychoff, developed in Finland and produced at the Sinebrychoff brewery in Kerava. Crowmoor was launched in 2002. The product line includes the dry apple cider Crowmoor Dry Apple, the very dry and acidic apple cider Extra Dry Apple and Dark Apple. In 2016 the product line was expanded by the new country cider series Hazy & Sour, which partly uses unfiltered apple juice, making the drink naturally hazy. The alcohol content of the cider is 4.7 percent.

The product line has previously included perry cider and the Crowmoor Country Cider Still tap box, which was non-carbonated cider with 4.5 percent alcohol.

Since the early 2010s, Crowmoor has been Finland's most popular brand of cider for several years at the annual brand survey of Markkinointi & Mainonta magazine and Taloustutkimus.

Crowmoor Extra Dry Apple was named as the best cider in Finland at the cider contest of the 2010 Helsinki Beer Festival.
