= Hartwall =

Finnish beverage company

Hartwall Ltd
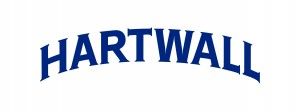
- Native name: Oy Hartwall Ab
- Company type: Limited company (osakeyhtiö)
- Industry: Drink industry
- Founded: 1836; 189 years ago in Helsinki, Finland
- Headquarters: Helsinki, Finland
- Products: Alcoholic drinks; soft drinks
- Website: export.hartwall.fi

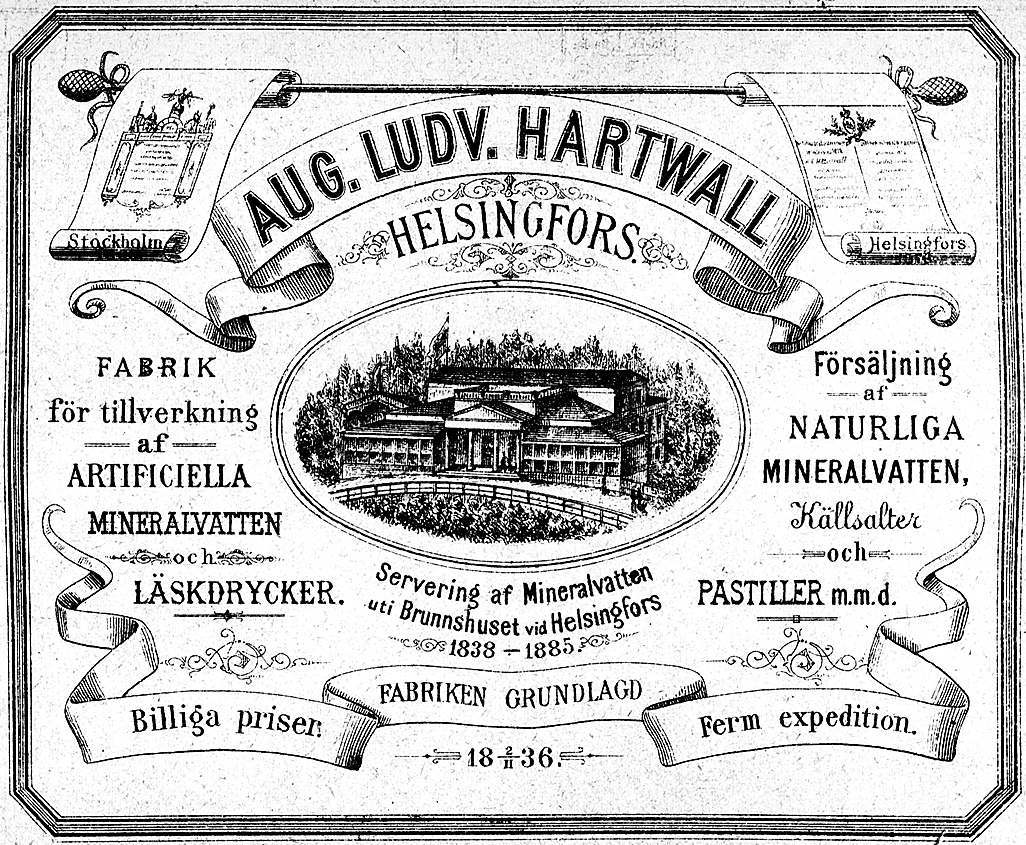
1886 advertisement for Hartwall soft drinks

Hartwall Ltd (natively Oy Hartwall Ab) is a beverage company based in Helsinki, Finland. It was founded in 1836. Its drinks range includes Jaffa, Pommac and Novelle waters. The company also owns the licence for manufacturing and selling PepsiCo's Pepsi, 7 Up and Mountain Dew brands in Finland. Hartwall's alcoholic beverages include Upcider cider, Lapin Kulta lager beer, Karjala beer and is the local producer of Foster's lager. In 2002, Hartwall was purchased by the UK based Scottish & Newcastle corporation, and when that company was bought out in 2008 the brand became owned by Heineken. Danish Royal Unibrew bought Hartwall in 2013. In 2017, a special beer brewery was completed in connection with the Lahti brewery, which was named Mattsson after a local beer influencer. In May 2019, Hartwall opened a Brewery Shop in their factory in Lahti, Kasaajankatu 13.

The popular Jaffa drink brand was introduced in the 1940s.

The company's Gin Long Drink (a grapefruit based alcoholic beverage) was introduced for the 1952 Summer Olympics held in Helsinki. It was originally developed to appeal to the tastes of foreign visitors; further, as a pre-prepared mixed drink, it was easy for bars to sell at a time when mixers were not common. The product became a huge hit with Finns and today it is the most heavily consumed mixed drink product in Finland.

== Product gallery ==
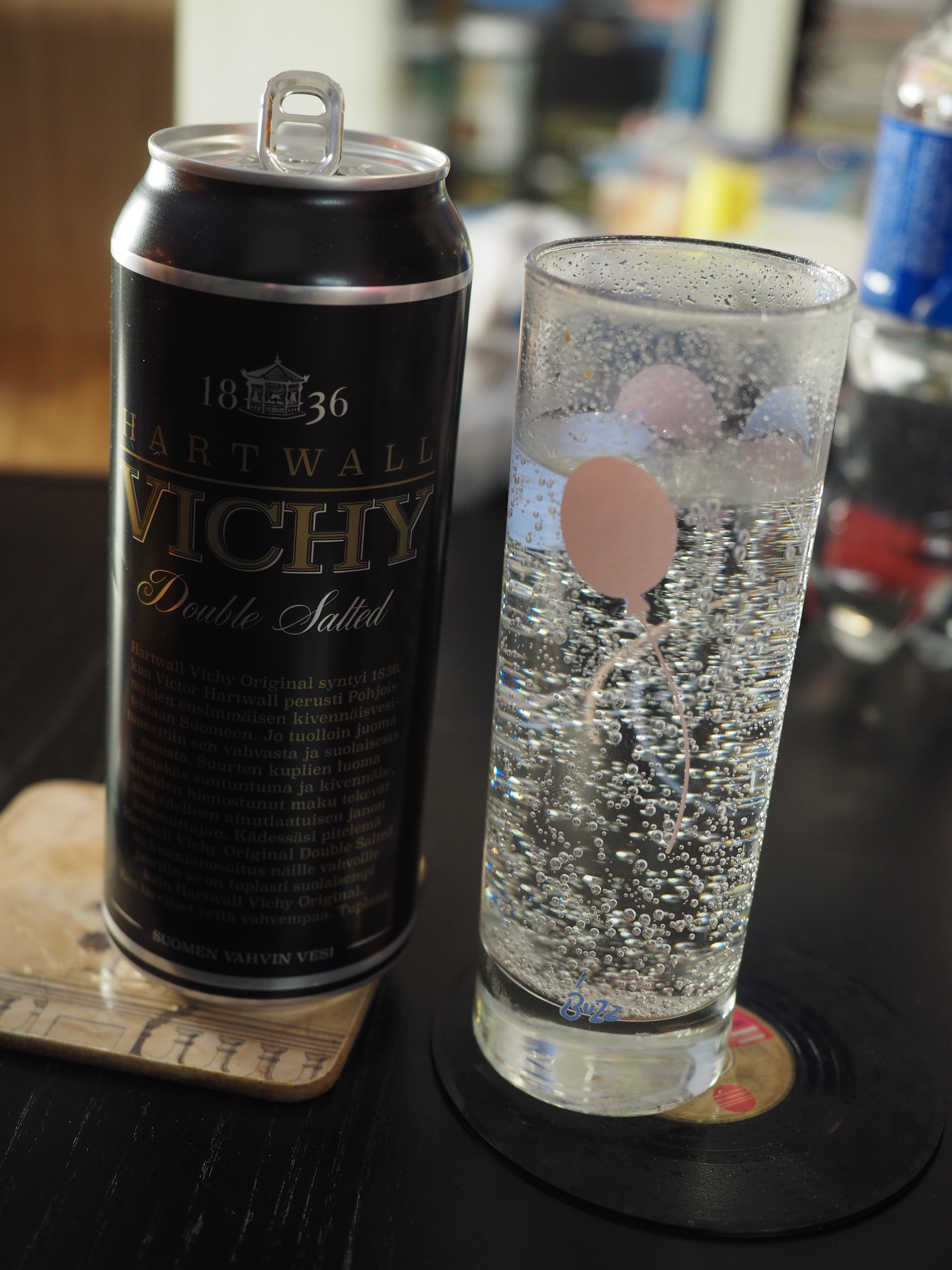
Vichy Double Salted (mineral water)

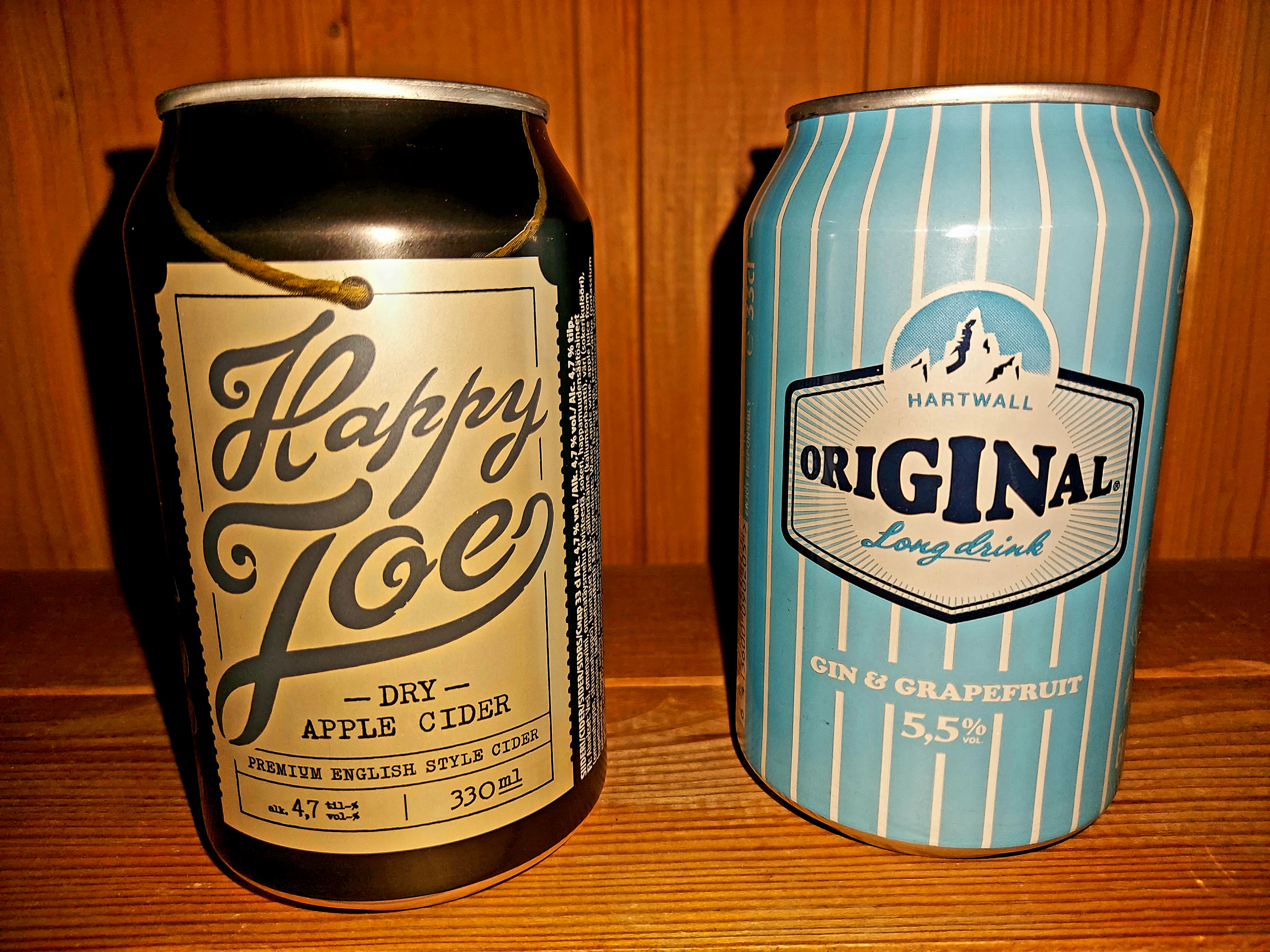
Happy Joe Dry Apple Cider and Original Long Drink

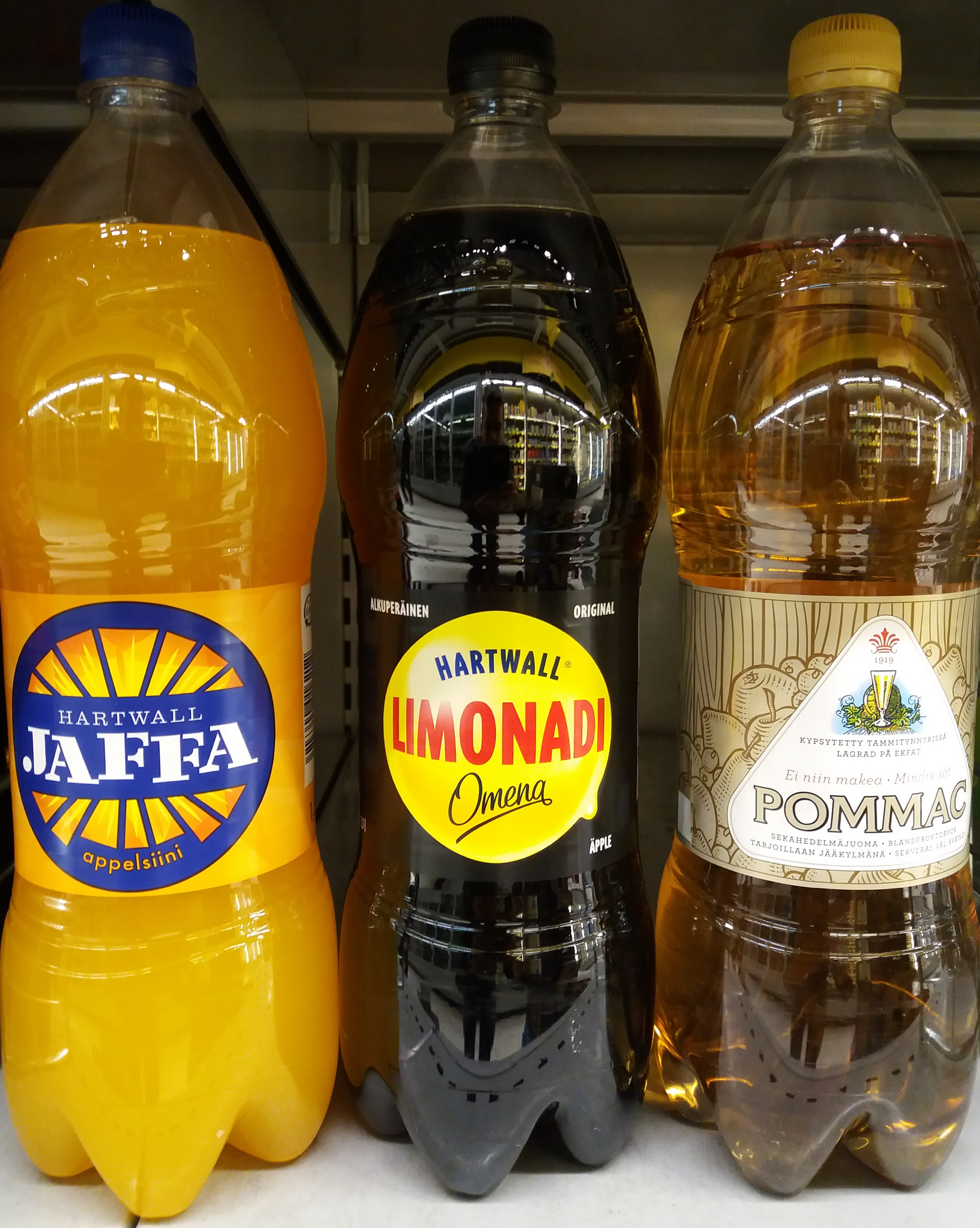
Jaffa, Limonadi Omena and Pommac (soft drinks)

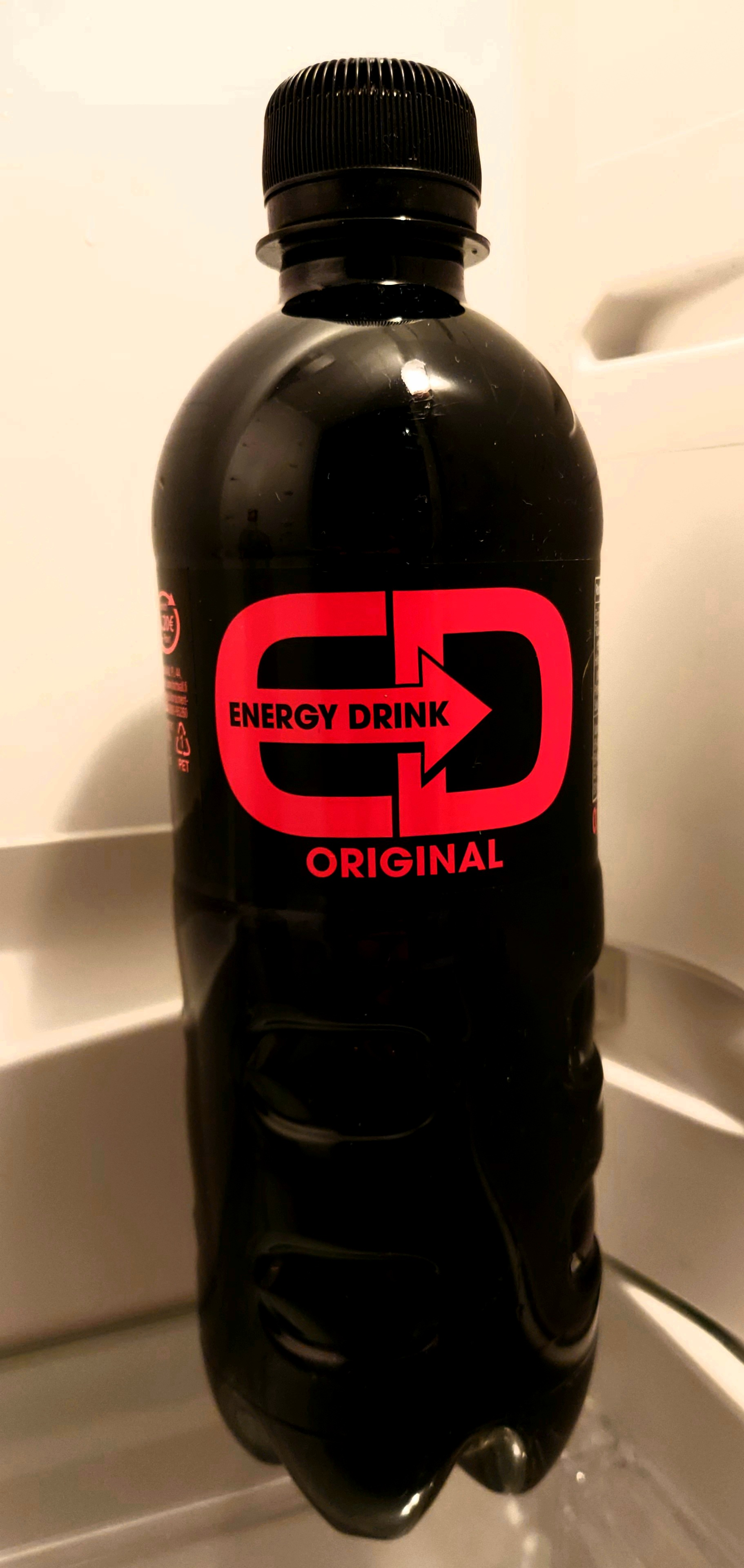
ED (energy drink)

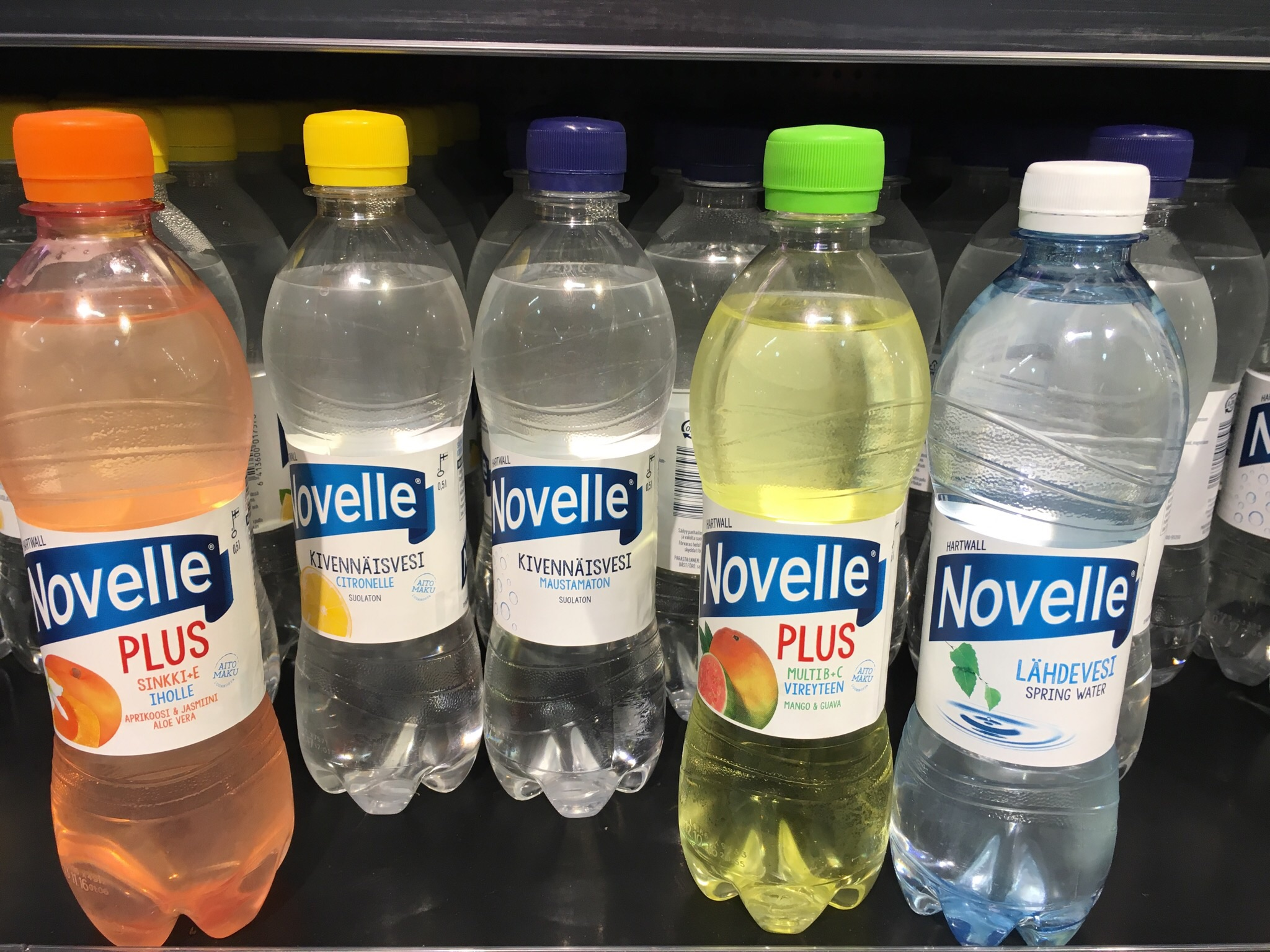
Novelle (mineral water)
