= Pommac =

European soft drink

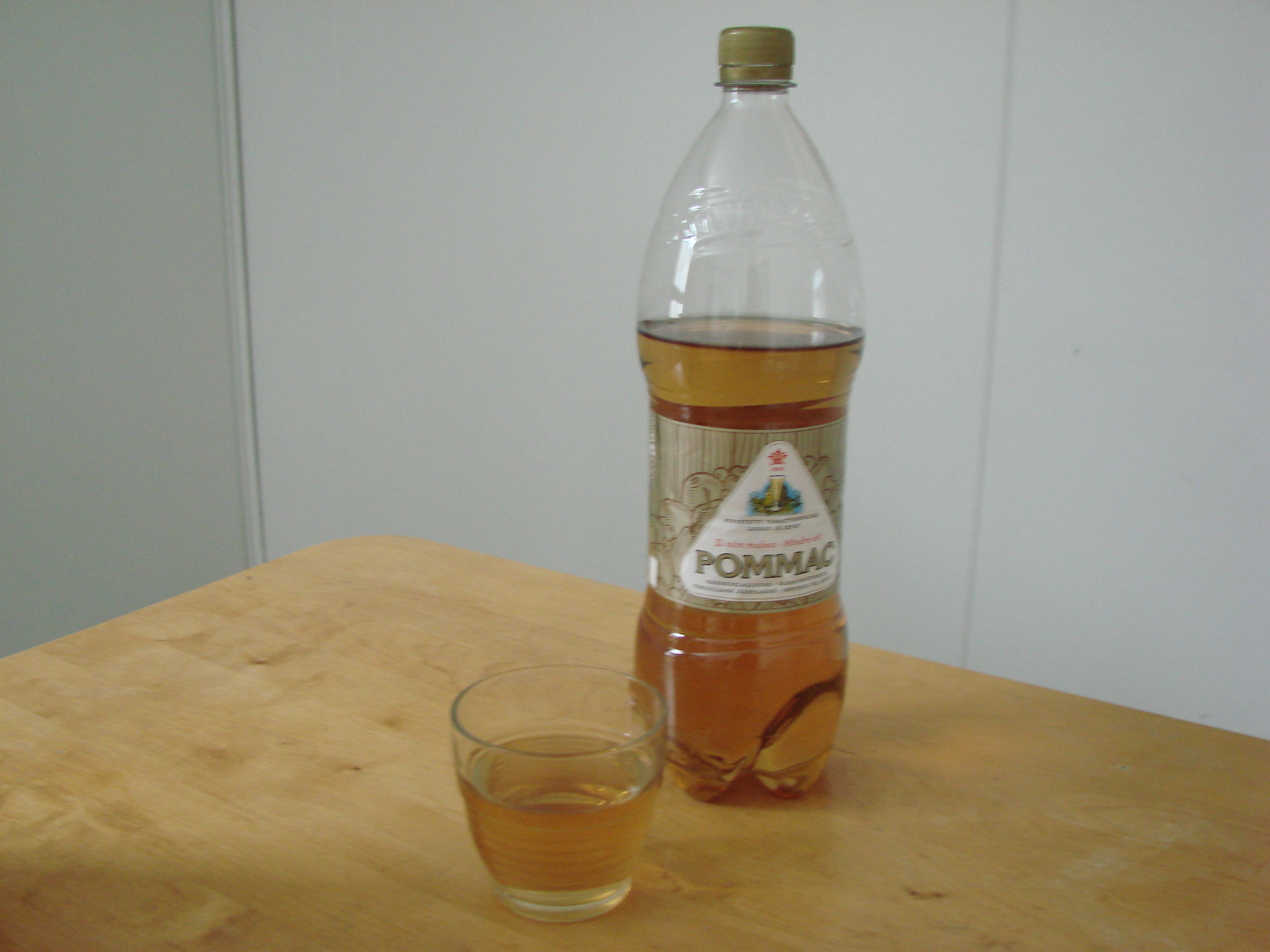
A bottle and a glass of Pommac

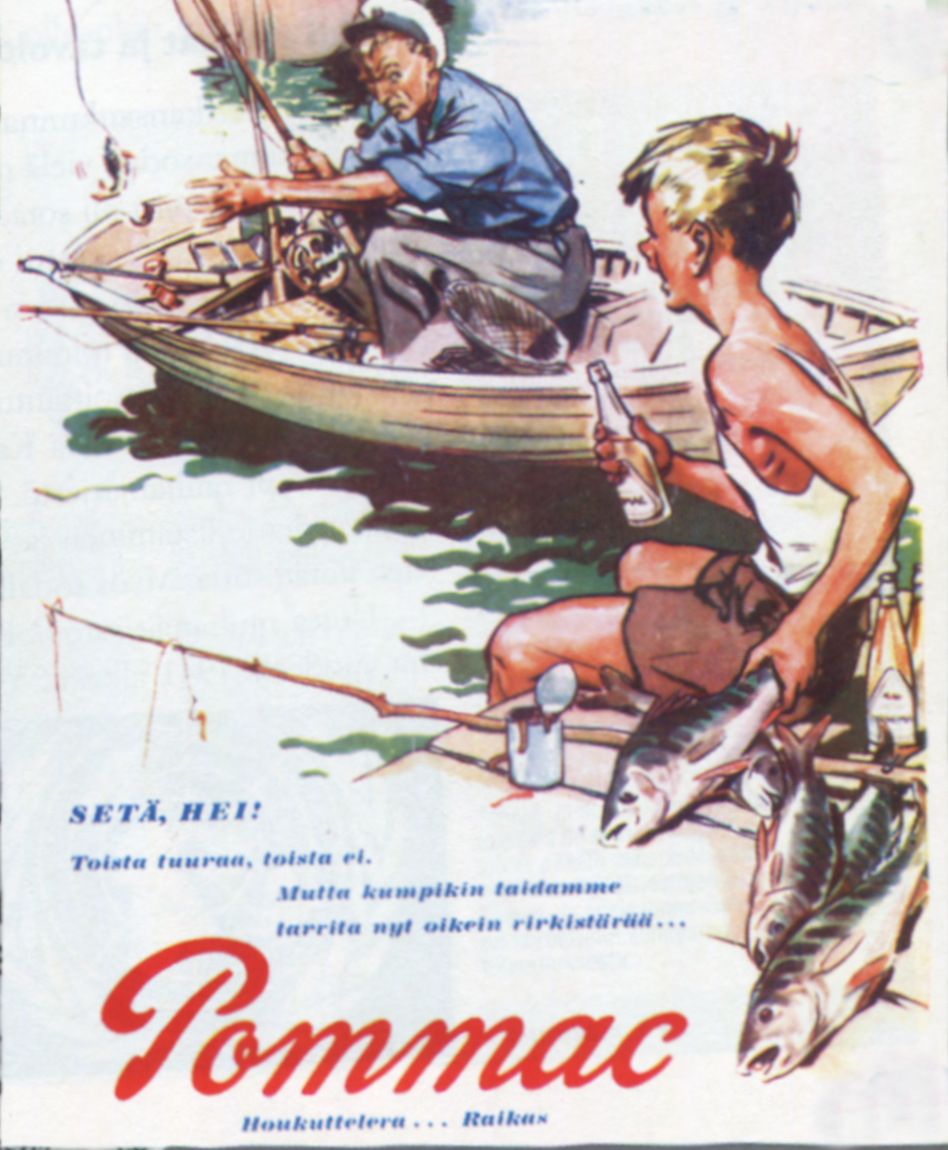
Finnish Pommac advertisement from the 1950s

Pommac is the brand name for a carbonated soft drink made by Carlsberg Sverige AB of fruits and berries. It is matured in oak barrels for three months. The name comes from Pommery, referring to Champagne, and Cognac, as it is matured in oak barrels like wine. Another theory of the naming is the French word pomace, which literally means remains of pressed fruits.

== History ==
In 1919, after his best efforts to keep his brewery running Anders Lindahl moved to Stockholm, Sweden as a failed businessman, and founded Fructus Fabriker and began to make Pommac. The recipe was made by a Finland-Swedish inventor. The drink was made for the upper classes as an alcohol-free substitute for wine.

In the US, Dr Pepper distributed a formulation of it, with sodium cyclamate as a sweetener, as a diet drink from 1963 to 1969 in six-and-a-half- and ten-ounce bottles. The original had always used sugar as its sweetener.

Pommac is also served as a non-alcoholic champagne alternative on festive occasions.

In late 2004, Carlsberg in Denmark announced that they were going to cease production of Pommac for financial reasons. However, after overwhelming public demand, the company decided to keep marketing Pommac.

Finnish brewery Hartwall has produced Pommac in Finland since 1950. It purchased the Finnish trademark in 2001. Pommac is in Finland an extremely popular non-alcoholic substitute for Champagne and sparkling wines, and as children's birthday celebration drink.

== See also ==
- Champis
