= Grapefruit juice =

Fruit juice from grapefruits

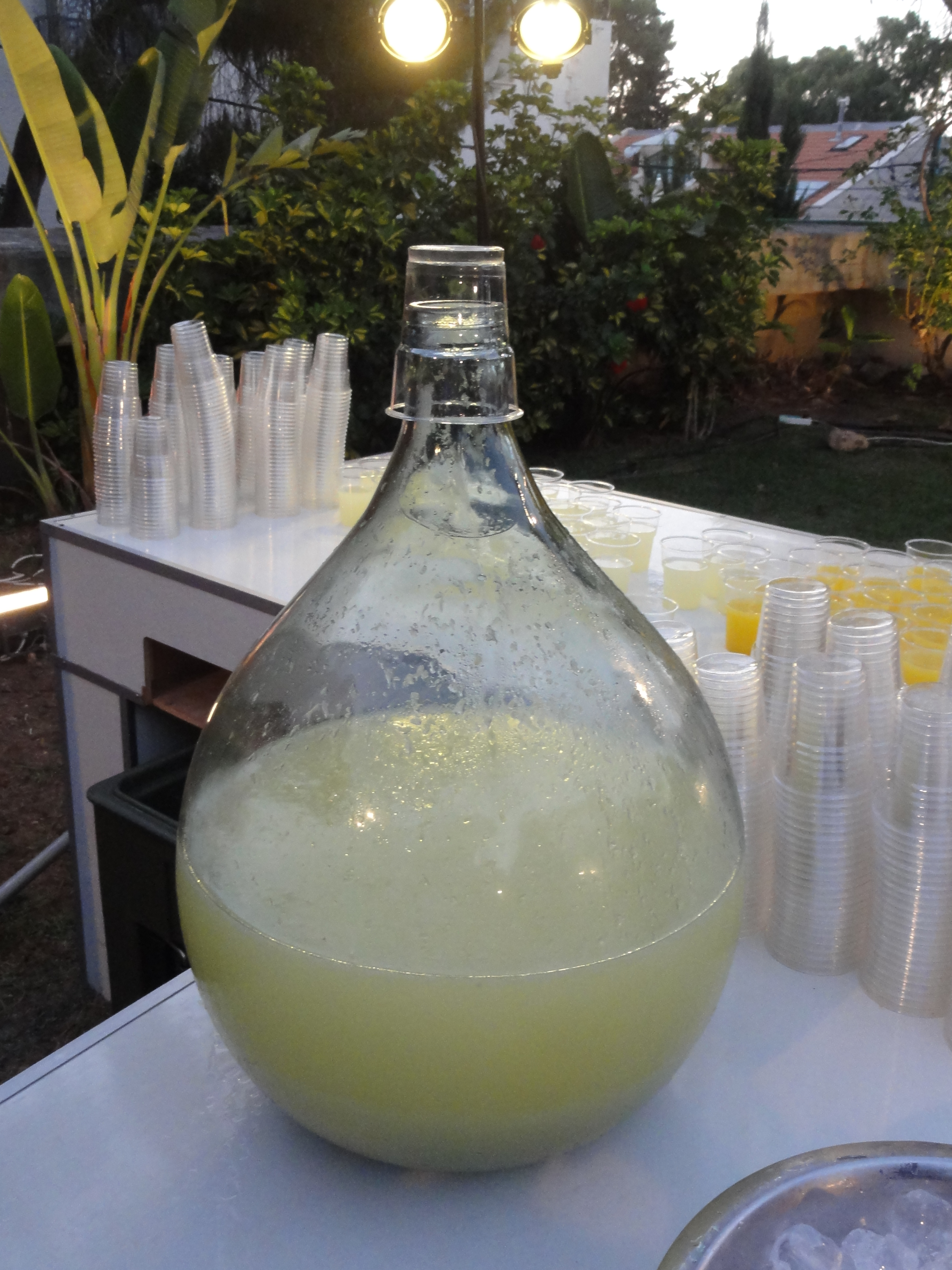
White grapefruit juice

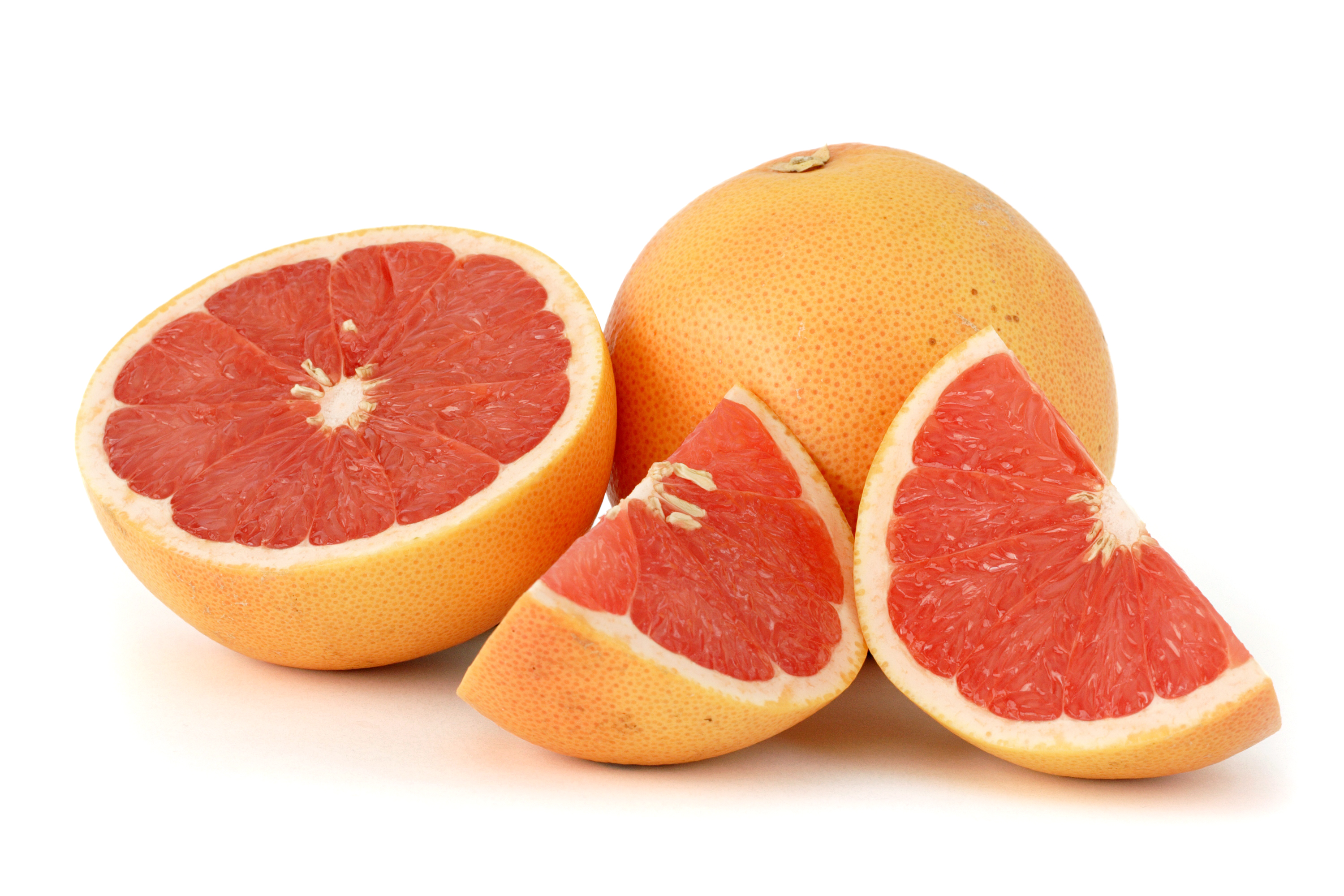
Chopped pink grapefruit

Grapefruit juice is the juice from grapefruits. It is rich in vitamin C and ranges from sweet-tart to very sour. Variations include white grapefruit, pink grapefruit and ruby red grapefruit juice.

Grapefruit juice is important in medicine because of its interactions with many common drugs including caffeine and medications, which can alter how they behave in the body.

Grapefruit juice is a common breakfast beverage in the United States.

== Drug interactions ==
Grapefruit and grapefruit juice have been found to interact with numerous drugs, in many cases resulting in adverse effects. This happens in two ways: one is that grapefruit can block an enzyme which metabolizes medication, and if the drug is not metabolized, then the level of the drug in the blood can become too high, leading to an adverse effect. The other effect is that grapefruit can block the absorption of drugs in the intestine, and if the drug is not absorbed, then not enough of it is in the blood to have a therapeutic effect.

One whole grapefruit or a glass of 200 mL (7 US fl oz) of grapefruit juice is enough to cause significant increases in drug exposure and harm. This especially affects drugs with low bioavailability due to high first pass metabolism. An interval of 4 hours between ingestion of grapefruit and drug (felodipine) produced the maximum change, with 50% of this at 10 hours and 25% after a day. Cumulative effects were also observed. Typically, drugs that are incompatible with grapefruit are marked as such on the container or package insert. People taking drugs can ask their health care provider or pharmacist questions about grapefruit/drug interactions.

In the medical literature, grapefruit juice is sometimes referred to by the acronym GFJ.

== Use in cocktails ==
Grapefruit juice is used in several cocktails, such as the sea breeze (which consists of grapefruit juice, vodka, and cranberry juice); the salty dog, the grapefruit mimosa, and a grapefruit radler.

== Canadian regulations ==
Canadian regulations on commercially produced and sold grapefruit juice are that it must be made from clean, mature grapefruit and may contain sugar, invert sugar, dextrose, glucose solids and class II preservatives such as benzoic acid, amylase, cellulase and pectinase. According to Canadian standards, grapefruit juice should contain more than 1.15 milliequivalents of free amino acid per 100 millilitres (3.5 imp fl oz; 3.4 US fl oz); more than 70 milligrams of potassium per 100 ml; and have an absorbance value for total polyphenolics of no less than 0.310. During the production process, the sugar content in the juice, before the addition of sugar, invert sugar, dextrose or glucose solids, should have a Brix reading of no less than 9.3. It must contain 0.7-2.1% of acid by weight as anhydrous citric acid.

== See also ==
- Grapefruit spoon
- Juicing
- List of juices
