= Salva =

Salva (Latin for "Save") may refer to:

== People ==
=== Mononym ===
- Salva (footballer, born 1961), Spanish football defender
- Salva (footballer, born 1981), Spanish football defender and football manager
- Salva (music producer) (born 1981), American musician

=== Given name ===
- Salva Arco (born 1984), Spanish basketball player
- Salva Ballesta (born 1975), Spanish football striker
- Salva Chamorro (born 1990), Spanish football forward
- Salva Díez (born 1963), Spanish basketball player
- Salva Ferrer (born 1998), Spanish football defender
- Salva Kiir (born 1951), South Sudanese president
- Salva Iriarte (born 1952), Spanish football midfielder and football manager
- Salva Sanchis (born 1974), Spanish dancer
- Salva Sevilla (born 1984), Spanish football midfielder
- Salva Dut (born 1974), Founder of Water for Sudan
- Fransisco Alverez (born 2001) Venuzalen Baseball Catcher

=== Middle name ===
- Francisco Salva Campillo (1751–1828), Spanish scientist

=== Surname ===
- Antonio Salvá (born 1952), Spanish politician and urologist
- Federica Salva (born 1971), Italian yacht racer
- Julio Salvá (born 1987), Argentine football goalkeeper
- Héctor Salva (1939–2015), Uruguayan football midfielder
- Nico Salva (born 1990), Filipino basketball player
- Ray Salva (born 1947), American politician
- Victor Salva (born 1958), American film director

== Locations ==
- Salva, Bistrița-Năsăud, a commune in Romania
- Salva, Michigan, an unincorporated community in the United States
- Şəlvə, Khojali, Azerbaijan
- Şəlvə, Lachin, Azerbaijan

== Other ==
- Common sage
- Salva (cheese), from Italy
- Salva (India), a tribe in ancient India
- Salva veritate, Latin phrase
- Salva congruitate, Latin term for logic

== See also ==
- Salva Nos (disambiguation)
- Salvador (disambiguation)
- Salvas (disambiguation)
- Salvatore (disambiguation)
- Salvo (disambiguation)
- Salwa (disambiguation)
- Şəlvə (disambiguation)
