= Salve (disambiguation) =

A salve is a medical ointment used to soothe the head or other body surface.

Salve may also refer to:

== Places ==
- Salve, Apulia, a town in Italy
- Hohe Salve, a mountain

== People ==
- Salve Hodne (1845–1916), Norwegian politician
- Salve H. Matheson (1920–2005), American military officer
- Salve Andreas Salvesen (1909–1975), Norwegian politician
- Edgar Salvé (1946–2026), Belgian middle-distance runner
- Gus Salve, baseball player
- Harish Salve (21st century), Indian lawyer
- N. K. P. Salve (1921–2012), Indian politician

== Arts and entertainment ==
- Salve (film), a 2011 Iranian film
- "Salve", a song by Tommy Guerrero

== Groups, companies, organizations ==
- Salve Kallevig & Søn, a Norwegian shipping company
- Salve (restaurant), a restaurant in Helsinki, Finland

== Other uses ==
- Salve Regina, a Christian prayer

== See also ==
- Salva (disambiguation)
- Salvo (disambiguation)
