= Shelve =

Shelve may refer to:

- Şəlvə, Lachin, a village in Azerbaijan
- Shelve, Shropshire, a village in England

== See also ==
- Şəlvə (disambiguation)
- Shelf (disambiguation)
- Shelved, a Canadian television sitcom
