= Selvi =

Selvi may refer to:

== Places ==
- Selvi, Biga

== Films ==
- Driving with Selvi, a 2015 documentary film
- Selvi (1985 film), a 1985 Tamil film directed by K. Natraj
- Selvi, a Tamil language version of the 2016 Telugu film Babu Bangaram
- Selvi (2026 film), a 2026 Tamil film directed by Sailesh Rathnakumar

== People ==
=== Surname ===
- J. Jayalalithaa (1948–2016), Indian actress and politician, often credited as Kalai Selvi
- Murat Selvi (born 1982), Belgian footballer
- Thanjai Selvi, Tamil singer
- V. Radhika Selvi (born 1976), Indian politician

=== Given name ===
- Selvi Ramajayam, Indian politician
- Selvi Kılıçdaroğlu, wife of Turkish 2023 presidential election candidate Kemal Kılıçdaroğlu

== See also ==
- Salwa (disambiguation), a related name
