= Morten Michael Kallevig =

Morten Michael Kallevig may refer to:

- Morten Michael Kallevig (1842–1936), Norwegian businessman and politician
- Morten Michael Kallevig (1772–1827), Norwegian businessman
