= OLO =

Olo or OLO may refer to:

== Geography ==
- Olo, South Sudan, a town in South Sudan
- Olo language, a language of Papua New Guinea

== People ==
- Olo, Ale the Strong, a mythological king of Sweden
- Audovald and Olo, two generals in the Frankish campaign against the Lombards under kings Guntram and Childebert II

== Business ==
- Olo (online ordering), a United States online food ordering company
- On Line Opinion, an online journal in Australia
- Olo (restaurant), a Michelin starred restaurant in Helsinki, Finland

== Abbreviations and codes ==
- Obligations Linéaires Ordinaires, a type of government bond in Belgium
- Ohio Light Opera, an opera company in Ohio, USA
- Opera Lyra Ottawa, an opera company in Ontario, Canada
- Livvi-Karelian language, which is denoted as "olo" in the ISO 639-3 language codes
- Oslo Laptop Orchestra (OLO)
- Omega Pharma–Lotto, a cycling team by UCI team code
- Official Languages Ordinance (Cap. 5) of Hong Kong

== Other ==
- Olo board, a Hawaiian surfboard
- Ontario L'Orignal Railway
- Olo n:o 22, an outdoor sculpture in Helsinki
- Olos (album)
- OLOS (obstructed-line-of-sight), a lesser-used term in non-line-of-sight propagation
- Olo (color), an imaginary color produced by isolating M cones' responses

== See also ==
- 010 (disambiguation)
- Oio (disambiguation)
