= Hodne =

Hodne is a Norwegian surname. Notable people with the surname include:

- Bjarne Hodne (born 1943), Norwegian folklorist
- David Hodne (fl. 1991 – present), U.S. Army major general
- Ketil Hodne (born 1947), Norwegian boxer
- Olav Hodne (1921–2009), Norwegian humanitarian and missionary
- Salve Hodne (1845–1916), Norwegian businessman and politician
- Todd Hodne (1959–2020), American football player, convicted rapist and murderer
