= Salvo (disambiguation) =

A salvo is the simultaneous discharge of artillery or firearms.

Salvo may also refer to:

== People and fictional characters ==
- Salvo (surname), a list of people and fictional characters named Salvo, De Salvo, DeSalvo, Di Salvo or DiSalvo
- Salvo (given name), a list of people and fictional characters
- Salvo (artist), Italian artist Salvatore Mangione (1947-2015)

== Places ==
- Salvo, North Carolina, an unincorporated community
- Palacio Salvo, a building in Montevideo, Uruguay
- 29672 Salvo, an asteroid

== Arts and entertainment ==
- Salvo (film), a 2013 Italian film
- Salvo (band), an American punk pop and rock band
- Salvo, the original name for the game Battleship

== Other uses ==
- Salvo (magazine), a Christian magazine published by the Fellowship of St. James
- The Salvation Army in Australia, nicknamed "Salvos" in Australian English
- Salvo (detergent), a brand of laundry detergent manufactured by Procter and Gamble in the 1960s and 1970s
- Project SALVO, a US Army project for the development of an individual weapon
  - Springfield Armory SALVO, a rifle considered by Project SALVO

== See also ==
- Porto Salvo, a civil parish (Freguesias) in Oeiras, Portugal
- San Salvo, a comune and town in the Province of Chieti in the Abruzzo region of Italy
- Salva (disambiguation)
- Salve (disambiguation)
