= Maasmechelen =

Municipality on the Meuse in Limburg, Belgium

- Municipality
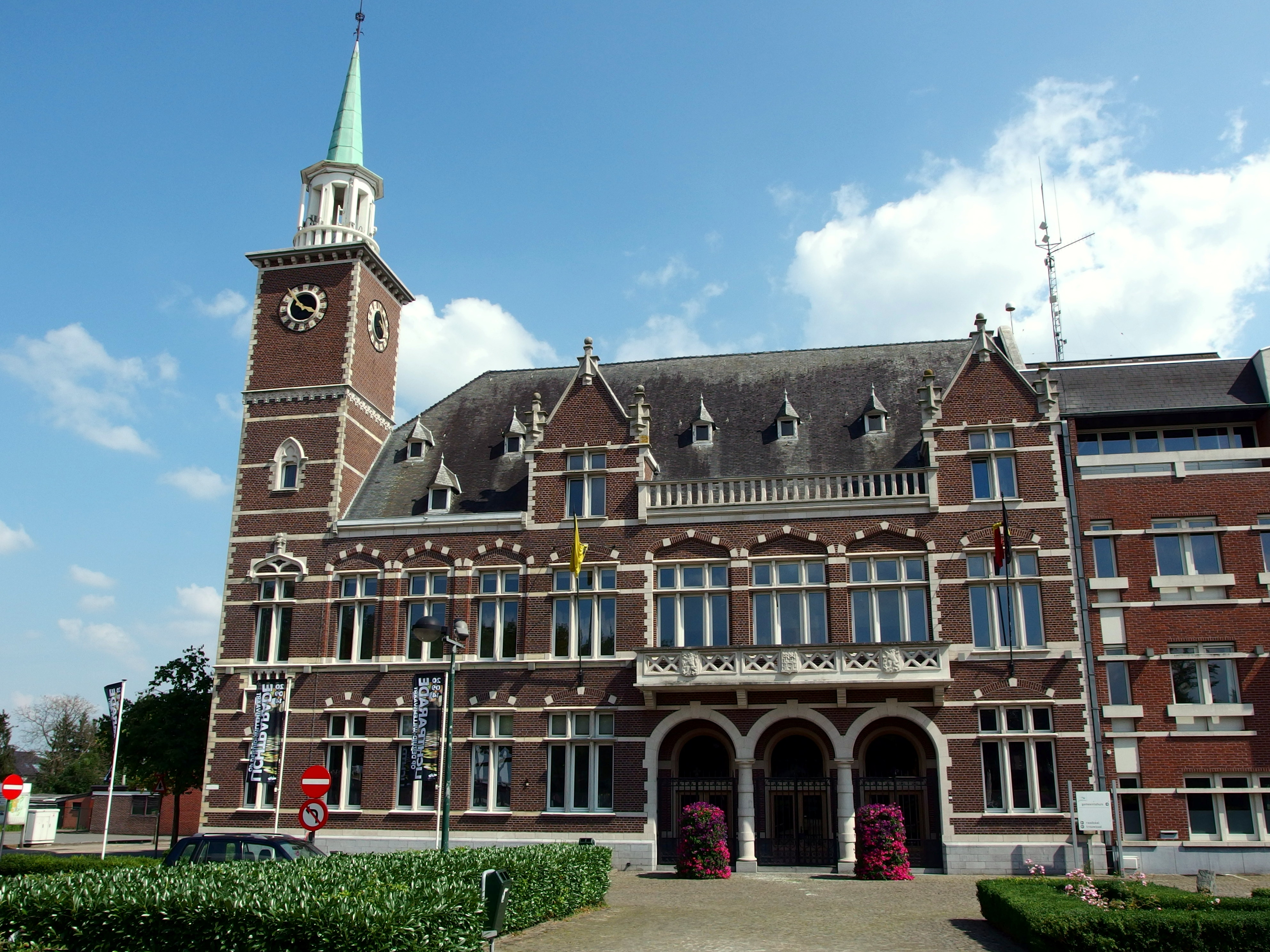

- Flag Coat of arms

- Location of Maasmechelen in Limburg
- Interactive map of Maasmechelen
- Location in Belgium
- Coordinates: 50°58′N 05°42′E
- Country: Belgium
- Community: Flemish Community
- Region: Flemish Region
- Province: Limburg
- Arrondissement: Tongeren

Government
  - Mayor: Raf Terwingen (CD&V)
  - Governing parties: CD&V, Open VLD

Area
  - Total: 76.85 km^{2} (29.67 sq mi)

Population (2018-01-01)
  - Total: 38,193
  - Density: 497.0/km^{2} (1,287/sq mi)
- Postal codes: 3630-3631
- NIS code: 73107
- Area codes: 089
- Website: www.maasmechelen.be

Maasmechelen (Dutch pronunciation: [maːsˈmɛxələ(n)]; Limburgish: Mechele) is a municipality located on the Meuse in the Belgian province of Limburg.

It comprises the former municipalities of Mechelen-aan-de-Maas, Vucht, Leut, Meeswijk, Uikhoven, Eisden, Opgrimbie, Boorsem, and Kotem.

Due to Maasmechelen's location near the borders of both the Netherlands and Germany, as well as its coal mining history, quite a few of its current inhabitants are of Dutch, German, Polish, or Mediterranean (mainly Italian) origin.

== History ==
=== Prehistoric and Roman times ===
The plateau of Campine was built up during the ice age with deposits of sand and other material that the Meuse river had eroded in the upstream Ardennes region. The higher elevation and the proximity of fertile river clay made this location an attractive one for the prehistoric tribes who established themselves here in the 2nd millennium BC and for the Celtic peoples who moved in the area in the 1st millennium BC.

In Roman times, this region was at the border between the provinces of Gallia Belgica and Germania Inferior. The main Roman road crossed the river near Maastricht, to the south. Settlements were built where Maasmechelen lies today to service the garrison that was maintained to protect the bridge in Maastricht.

=== Middle Ages ===
The few centuries that followed the fall of the Roman Empire were marked by a sharp decline in travel and trade. The Franks were now the new masters of the land. International commercial activities resumed on the river around the 7th century. This was also a time when the river progressively moved eastward. The Roman colonies that were originally built on the right bank of the river now found themselves on the left bank. The abundance of streams and wetlands favoured stockbreeding over agriculture. The feudal system and the practice of paying civil servants with land resulted in endless territory subdivisions. Some parcels, including Mechelen-aan-de-Maas and parts of Opgrimbie, were given to the abbey of Saint Servatius in Maastricht. Other parcels came into the hands of local lords, who pledged allegiance to the Holy Roman Emperor. Yet other parts of the territory came into the possession of local religious communities. Churches and cloisters were built and enlarged to accommodate a growing population.

=== 19th and 20th century ===
The aftermath of the French Revolution brought a series of dramatic changes that include the dismantlement of most religious organizations, the closing of churches, and the reorganization of the territory into new administrative entities. During the 19th century, the area had still an unmistakable rural character.

On May 20, 1901, André Dumont found commercial-grade coal in neighbouring As. This led to the exploitation of coal mines in Eisden from 1923 to 1987. A garden city and a new church dedicated to Saint Barbara, also known as the mining cathedral, were built there. The industrial development attracted workers from all over Europe, which accounts for the numerous international restaurants still found today in Eisden.

== Attractions ==
- The largest part of the natural reservation Nationaal Park Hoge Kempen is located on Maasmechelen's territory. It was established to protect the unique fauna and flora of the plateau of Campine.
- The Eisdense cité, a 20th-century garden city with typical cottage-like houses in a park setting, still bear witness to the city's mining history. One of the houses has been converted into a museum.
- Maasmechelen Village, an outlet shopping center was built near the old mining district. In 2010, 2.5 million visitors were counted.
- A functional windmill dating from 1801 was recently restored and is open to the public every other Sunday.
- A small carnival museum can also be visited right next to the city's main square.

=== Events ===
- The carnival and parade, where masked people entertain numerous visitors, occur every year on November 11, starting at 11:11 am.

== Sports ==
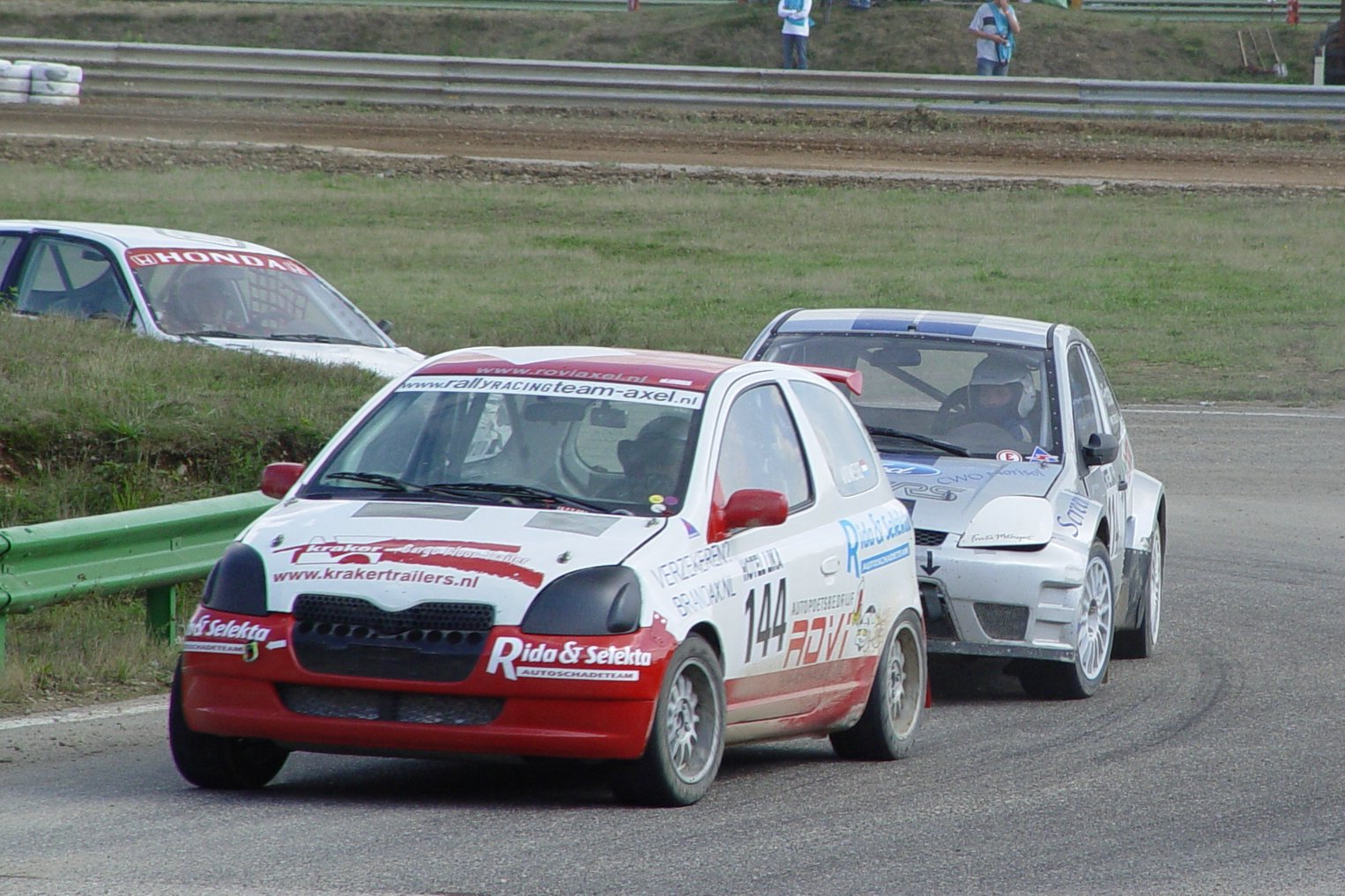
Duivelsbergcircuit – Rallycross at Maasmechelen-Opgrimbie

- Well known sports personalities from the Maasmechelen region are:
  - athlete Patrick Stevens, a sprinter (olympic finalist on 200 meters in 1996)
  - judoka Heidi Rakels.
- Maasmechelen hosts the football club named K. Patro Maasmechelen.
- The town is also the home of the Duivelsbergcircuit (Devils Hill Circuit) at Opgrimbie, a well attended international Rallycross venue.
- Cyclo-cross Maasmechelen which is part of the UCI Cyclo-cross World Cup is held in Hoge Kempen National Park.

== Famous inhabitants ==
- Katerine Avgoustakis, singer and winner of “Star Academy” in 2005 (b. 1983)
- Logan Bailly, footballer
- Ruben Bemelmans, tennis player
- Luca Brecel, snooker player
- Nico Claesen, former footballer
- Davy De Fauw, footballer
- Heidi Rakels, judoka
- Murat Selvi, professional footballer
- Dré Steemans, TV host
- Leandro Trossard, professional footballer
