= Sally Kader =

Head of United States Federation for Middle East Peace

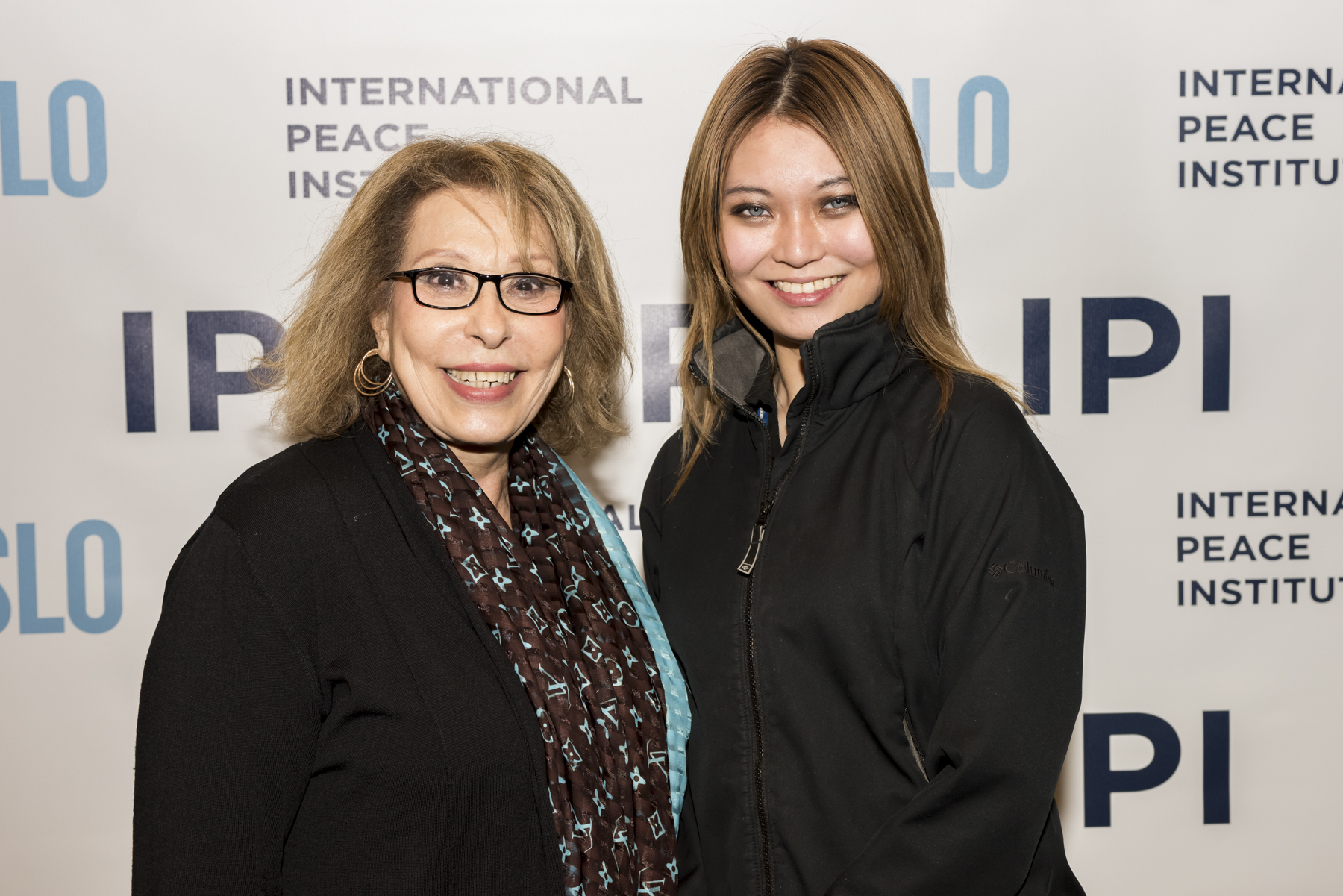
- Education: University of Lebanon, Central Missouri State University
- Known for: President of United States Federation for Middle East Peace

Sally "Salwa" Shatila Kader is the co-founder and president of the International Federation for Peace & Sustainable Development (formerly USFMEP), a bipartisan, non-profit and non-governmental organization, which has seventeen chapters around the world including its headquarters in New York City. Kader is a peace activist and currently leads IFPSD programs and events at the United Nations Headquarters in New York City and around the world. She has been recognized by world leaders and organizations for her contributions towards peace.

== Background ==
Kader, who was born in Beirut, Lebanon, holds a Bachelor of Arts (Psychology and History) from Central Missouri State University.

== Activism ==
As President of USFMEP, Kader has traveled across the United States and the Middle East developing learning opportunities in relation to the Middle East, raising awareness about its religions, cultures, history and political landscape. Kader also engages in dialogue with the people of the Middle East, educating them about American culture and tradition, emphasizing the inherently peaceful nature of the American people. Through her work with the organization, Kader has sought to strengthen relations between the United States and the Arab and Muslim worlds by undermining common misconceptions and enhancing tolerance. As an academic well-versed in archeological studies, Kader has also supported the preservation of numerous archeological dig sites and their cultural artifacts in countries such as Iraq, Jordan, Lebanon, Libya, Tunisia and Morocco. Kader has strived to promote peace and tolerance amongst different groups of people by engaging in interfaith dialogue discussions, encouraging youth education and facilitating women empowerment. She has met and worked with various world leaders including former United Kingdom Prime Minister Tony Blair and the late Benazir Bhutto. Kader has also led peace efforts with prominent celebrities including the famous actress Safia Al-Omari.

Kader has further collaborated with other leading UN organizations to submit joint statements to the Secretary-General of the United Nations, recommending certain amendments to existing resolutions. In 2004, USFMEP drafted and submitted a document advocating the implementation of international legal standards condemning religious intolerance, which was signed by approximately sixty religious leaders and theorists from around the world.

=== Involvement in Peace-Building Areas ===
Kader has been recognized for her contribution to global peace. She has sought to increase awareness of pressing global issues such as human trafficking and much of her work has been committed towards building peace in the world. In pursuit of these goals, Kader has hosted numerous events, panel discussions, peace conferences, vigils, prayer services and peace marches including International Peace Conferences at the Arab League Headquarters in Cairo, Egypt, Annual UN International Day of Peace celebrations throughout the world and an International Peace Walk in Sharm el-Sheikh, Egypt (December 19, 2005) among others.

=== Women Empowerment Initiatives ===
Kader is a long-time activist for women’s rights and much of her work has been devoted toward the empowerment of women and the elevation of women’s status in society. She has taken an active involvement in women empowerment initiatives by encouraging dialogue and educating audiences on various women’s issues. This has included hosting interfaith discussions between different religious women, raising awareness on the trafficking of young girls, promoting women’s role in the media and encouraging women to participate in society, politics and decision-making. Some of her work has included helping refugee Palestinian women and hosting international conferences including one on the Role of Immigrant Women towards International Peace in Stockholm, Sweden.

In addition, Kader has annually organized numerous side-events for the United Nations Commission on the Status of Women (“CSW”) on a variety of topics. Some of the CSW side events hosted by Kader have included Women in Islam: East Meets West (March 4, 2005), The Trafficking of Young Girls in the 21st Century (February 26, 2007), Rights of Muslim Women: Islam and Tradition (March 8, 2005), The Role of Women in Creating a Counter-Balance to Extremism (February 2007), The Role of Women in the Media Coverage of Peace-Building between the Middle East and the West (February 28, 2007), Empowering Women in Politics and Decision-Making in Muslim Countries (March 6, 2007), Empowerment of Women through Media Exposure for Building Peace (February 25, 2008), Violence against the Working Mother (March 1, 2010) and Muslim, Jewish and Christian Women Who Share the Vision of Understanding (March 12, 2009) among many others. USFMEP has further submitted statements for the CSW sessions including a recent one on Rural Women and Girls in Conflict and Post-Conflict Areas.

=== Youth Education ===
Kader is a prominent activist working in the fight for greater recognition of children’s rights. She has promoted youth empowerment through events such as the Montessori Model United Nations Conferences in April 2011 and 2012, youth interfaith dialogue events in addition to hosting several panel discussions on trafficking in children. She serves as an Ambassador and an Auxiliary Board Member of the CIS, specifically supporting the Virtual Global Task Force, which was the first ever international operational law enforcement task force to protect children worldwide over the Internet.

Kader has also spoken to University students throughout the world including her speeches at the University of Wollongong in Dubai (December 12, 2010), University of Saint Mary in Leavenworth, Kansas (September 2007), Georgetown University (November 14, 2005) and several others.

=== Promotion of Interfaith Dialogue ===
Kader has held numerous interfaith discussions bringing people of different faiths and cultures together for peaceful dialogue. She has hosted forums and conferences promoting interfaith and intercultural discussion between clashing religious communities, bringing religious leaders together to discuss shared values and the importance of religious tolerance. On July 20, 2009, Kader hosted an unprecedented congregation of 30 rabbis and imams from 13 European countries to the United Nations headquarters in New York City to discuss peace initiatives. She also served as key speaker at the United Nations Buddhist-Muslim Dialogue Series (September 3, 2008).

Kader has further sought to involve women and youth in the interfaith dialogue process. She has moderated a Youth Interfaith Dialogue for Peace and Mutual Understanding (July 25, 2011) as well as events catered towards women. These include Women are mirrored in Each Other: An Interfaith Dialogue and Muslim (March 1, 2012) and Christian and Jewish Women Who Share the Vision of Understanding (March 12, 2009) among others. Kader also served as a delegate for the Global Action Forum: Arab and American Dialogue.

== Advocacy ==
Some of her speaking engagements have included the UN Headquarters in Geneva, the UN Pavilion at the 2010 Shanghai World Expo in China and several universities including Georgetown University, American University, the University of Wollongong in Dubai and Saint Mary University in Leavenworth, Kansas. Kader participated as a panelist for a number of human trafficking conferences including “Children in Slavery – the 21st Century Campaign” and “Human Trafficking Beijing +15 Lessons Learned.” She is also active with the National Federation of Republican Women and has performed as a guest speaker at many of their forums. Kader has also taken role as keynote speaker at events for the Council on Foreign Relations.

She is also a member of the Israel-Palestine NGO Working Group. She serves as the chief executive officer of the International Federation for Peace and Security and the president and founder of the Sam Kader Memorial Foundation to Defeat MRSA. Furthermore, she sits on a number of boards for a wide range of advocacy groups and committees. These include the Convention of the Rights of the Child (CRC), the NGO Committee on Racism and the NGO Committee on Human Rights. In addition, Kader helped open the New Jersey chapter of the Arab-American Anti-Discrimination Committee. Kader also served as the director of the United Nations Women’s Guild and helped open their chapter in Lebanon.

== Awards and recognition ==
Kader was an honored recipient of numerous awards for her efforts in building peace and empowering women. These prestigious awards include:

- The Millennium Development Goal Award,
- An award from Misr University in Cairo, Egypt
- The Montessori Model United Nations Award
- A Peace Award from the Governor of Alexandria, Egypt

== Media Presence ==
Kader has been featured on several international television networks and global media outlets for her work in the Far East, the Middle East, Europe and the United States. Moreover, she has been honored by world leaders and organizations throughout North America, Europe, the Middle East, Asia and Africa.
