= Şəlvə =

Şəlvə may refer to:

- Şəlvə, Khojali, Azerbaijan
- Şəlvə, Lachin, Azerbaijan
