= Oio =

Oio or OIO may refer to:

- Oio Region in Guinea-Bissau
- Oio railway station in New Zealand
- ōʻio, the Hawaiian name for bonefish
- Overseas Investment Office in New Zealand
- Iodine Dioxide

== See also ==
- Olo (disambiguation)
- 010 (disambiguation)
