= Hietalahdenranta =

Street in Helsinki, Finland

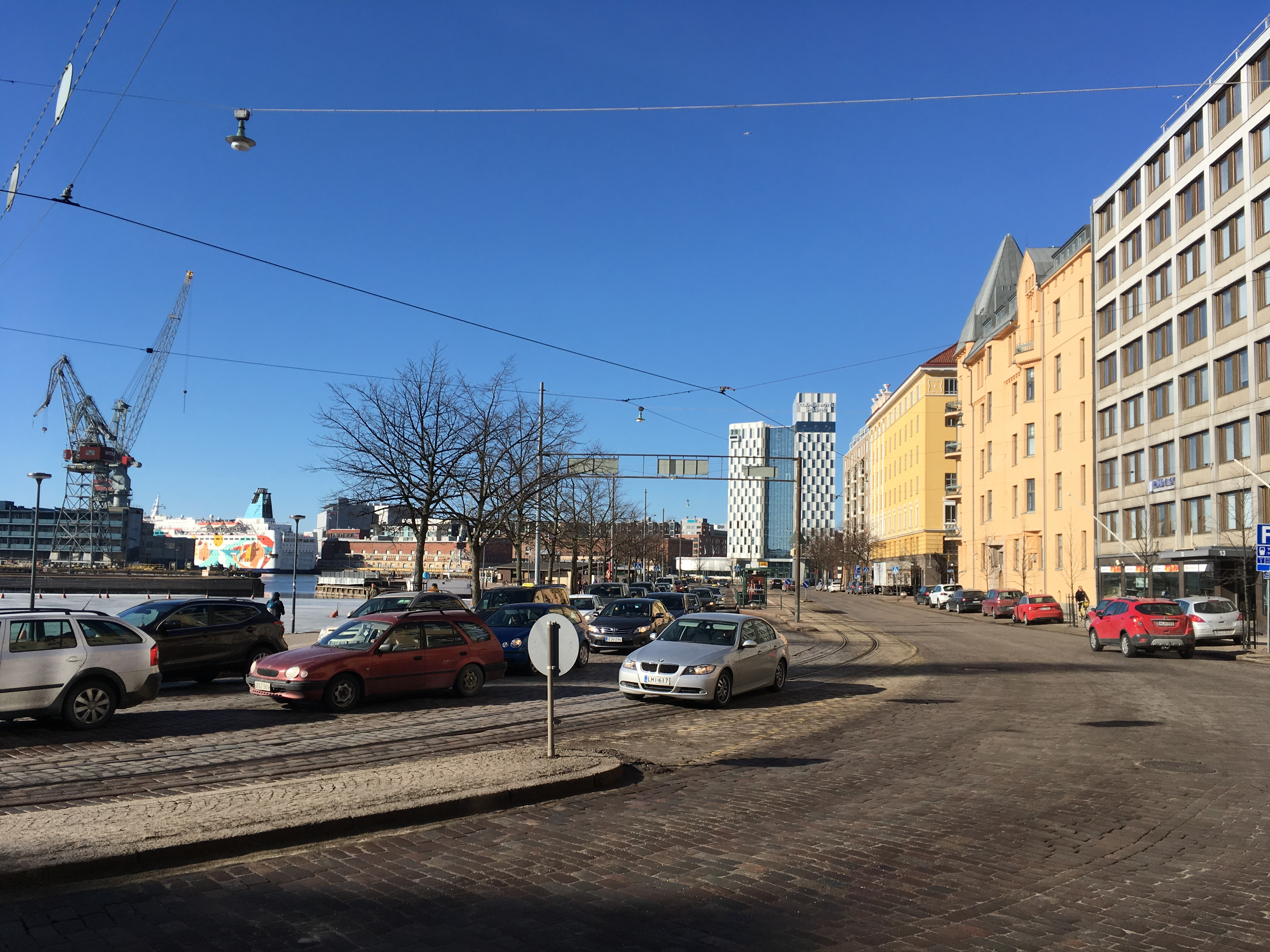
A view of the street towards Jätkäsaari. In the background is Clarion Hotel Helsinki.

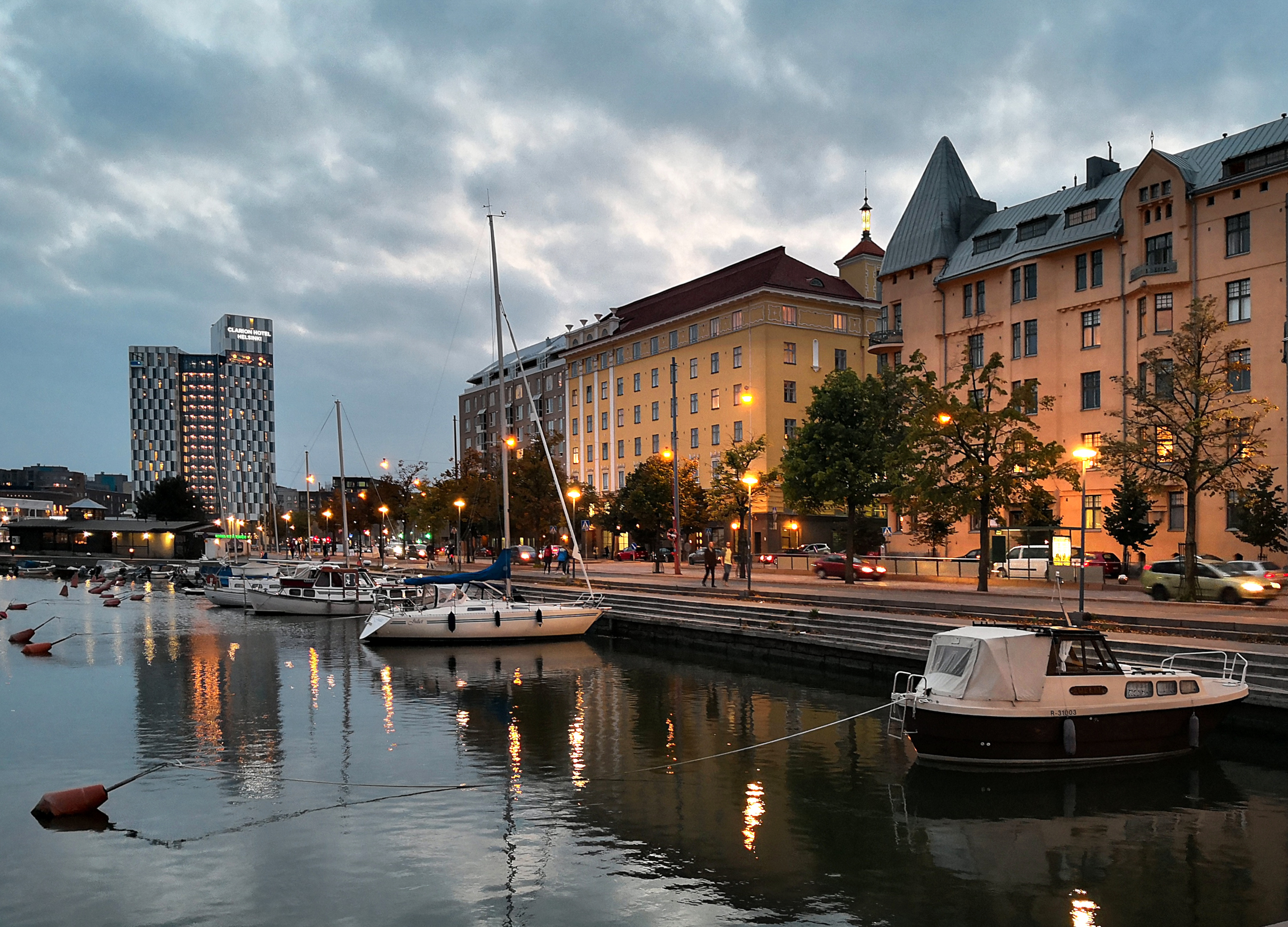
Piers for boats along the street.

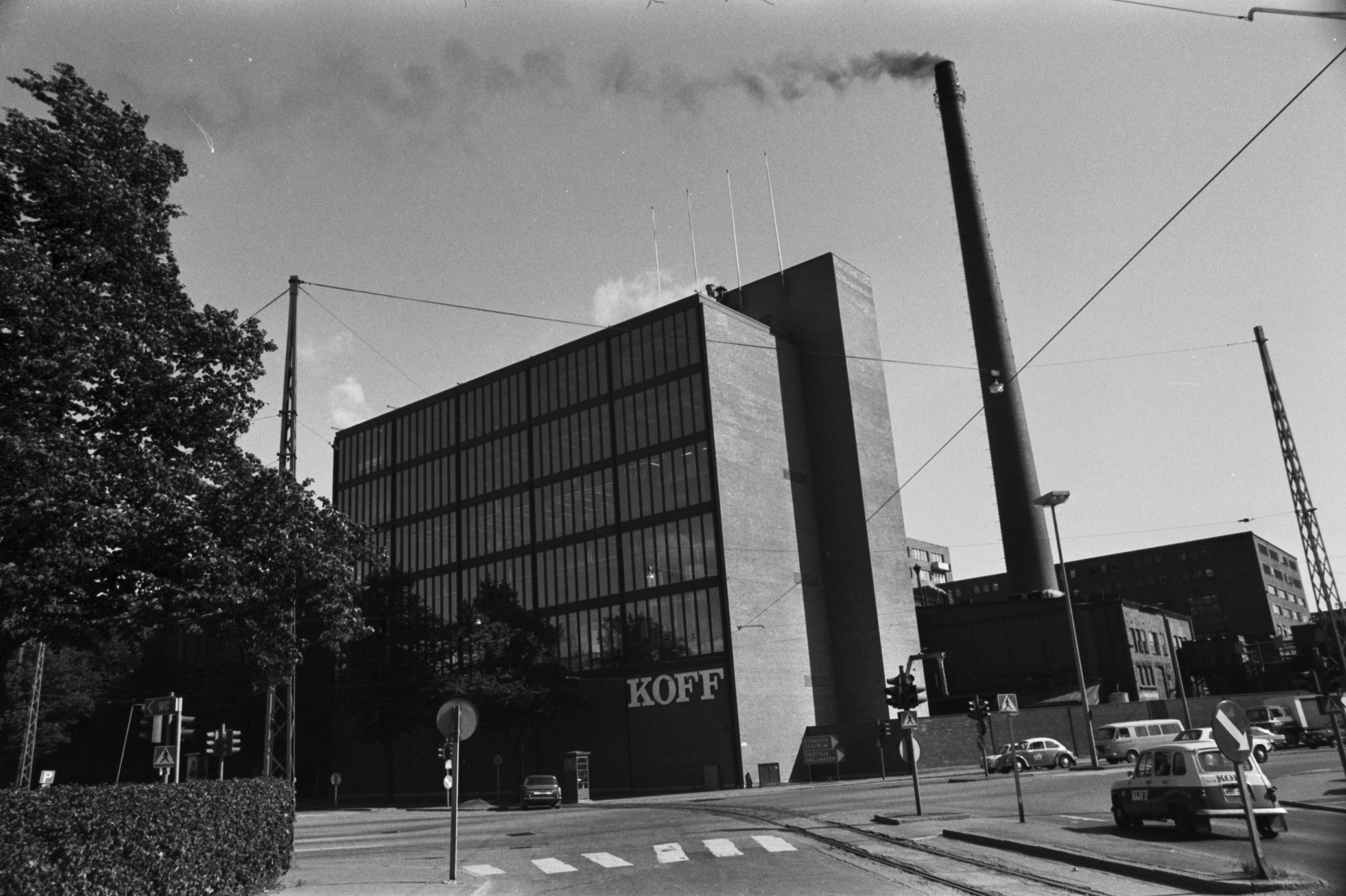
The Koff brewery was located at Hietalahdenranta up to the 1990s.

Hietalahdenranta (Swedish: Sandvikskajen) is a street located in the southern part of the centre of Helsinki, Finland. It is situated within the districts of Kamppi and Punavuori, belonging to the larger Hietalahti area.

Hietalahdenranta begins at the Länsilinkki traffic area in Kamppi, intersecting with Jätkäsaarenlaituri and Mechelininkatu. From there, the street curves around the harbor pool at the end of Hietalahti bay, connecting with Bulevardi and eventually ending at Punavuorenkatu. The street line continues further south along Telakkakatu.

Hietalahdenranta is equipped with tram tracks. Previously, the tracks led from Ruoholahdenranta to Bulevardi, but a new connection was built in 2021 via Telakkakatu, extending to Hernesaari.

== Etymology ==
The street derives its name from the nearby Hietalahti bay. Its official Swedish name was established in 1836 as SandviksQuain, which was later changed to Sandvikskajen in 1887 and remains in use to this day. In the following year, the street was divided into two parts known as Sandviks norra kajen and Sandviks södra kajen. These sections were assigned official Finnish names Hietalahden pohjoinen rantakatu and Hietalahden etelärantakatu in 1909. The two parts were merged back together in 1928, and the street was given its current name, Hietalahdenranta.

== Buildings ==
The buildings along the street are mainly on the eastern and northern edge where the street numbers are odd. On the side of the sea shore there is a service station at the start of the street and restaurant Merimakasiini at the other end. There are old buildings on the northern side of the harbour pool. Tenants of the buildings have included Kaj Eräjuuri's Haka-Auto, Yhtyneet Kuvalehdet and the Otava printing press. There are new buildings on the site of the dismantled Sinebrychoff building on the eastern side of the harbour pool.

Restaurant Salve was previously located at Hietalahdenranta 11 from where it moved to Hietalahdenranta 5 in autumn 2016.

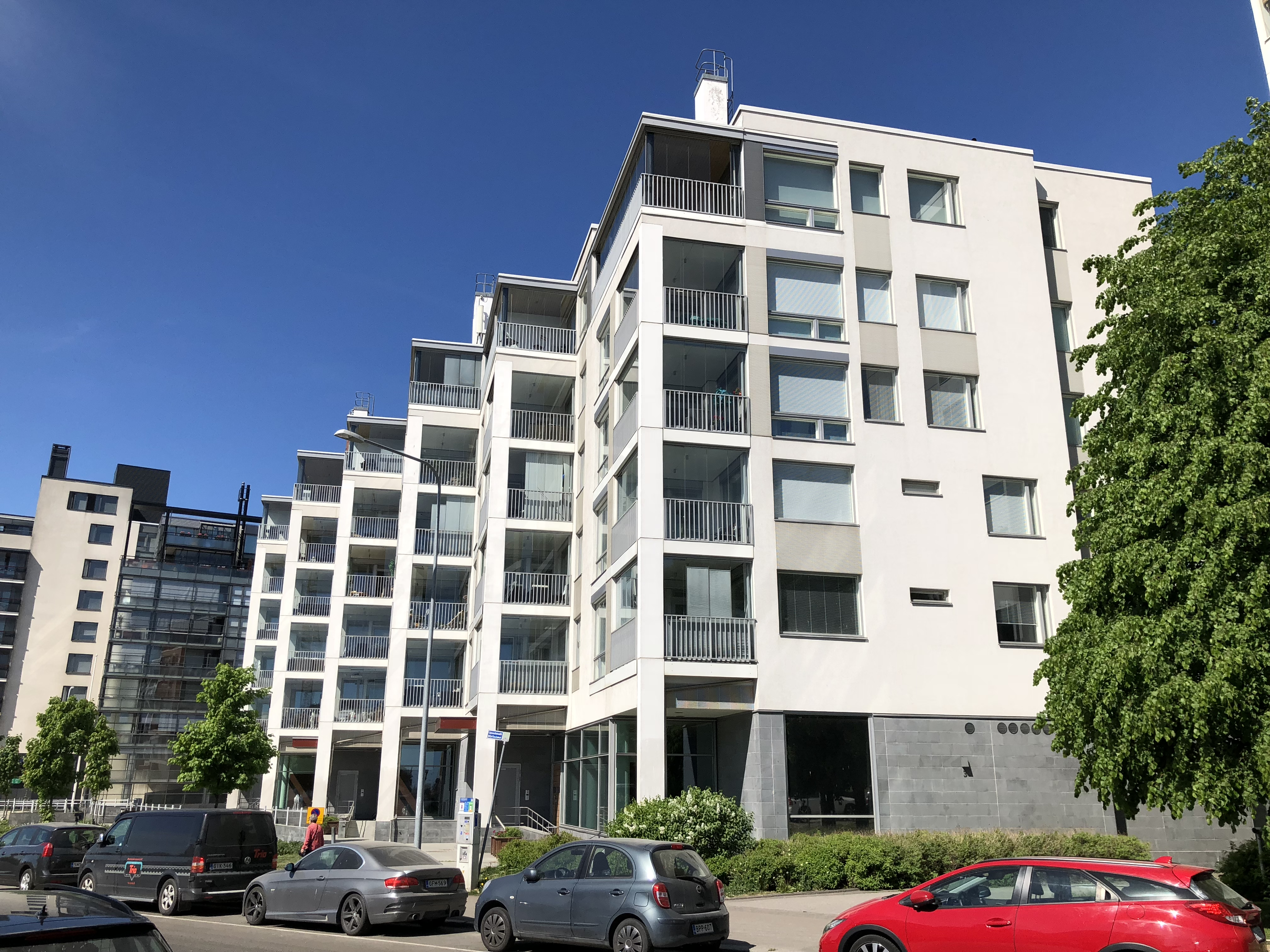
Hietalahdenranta 1

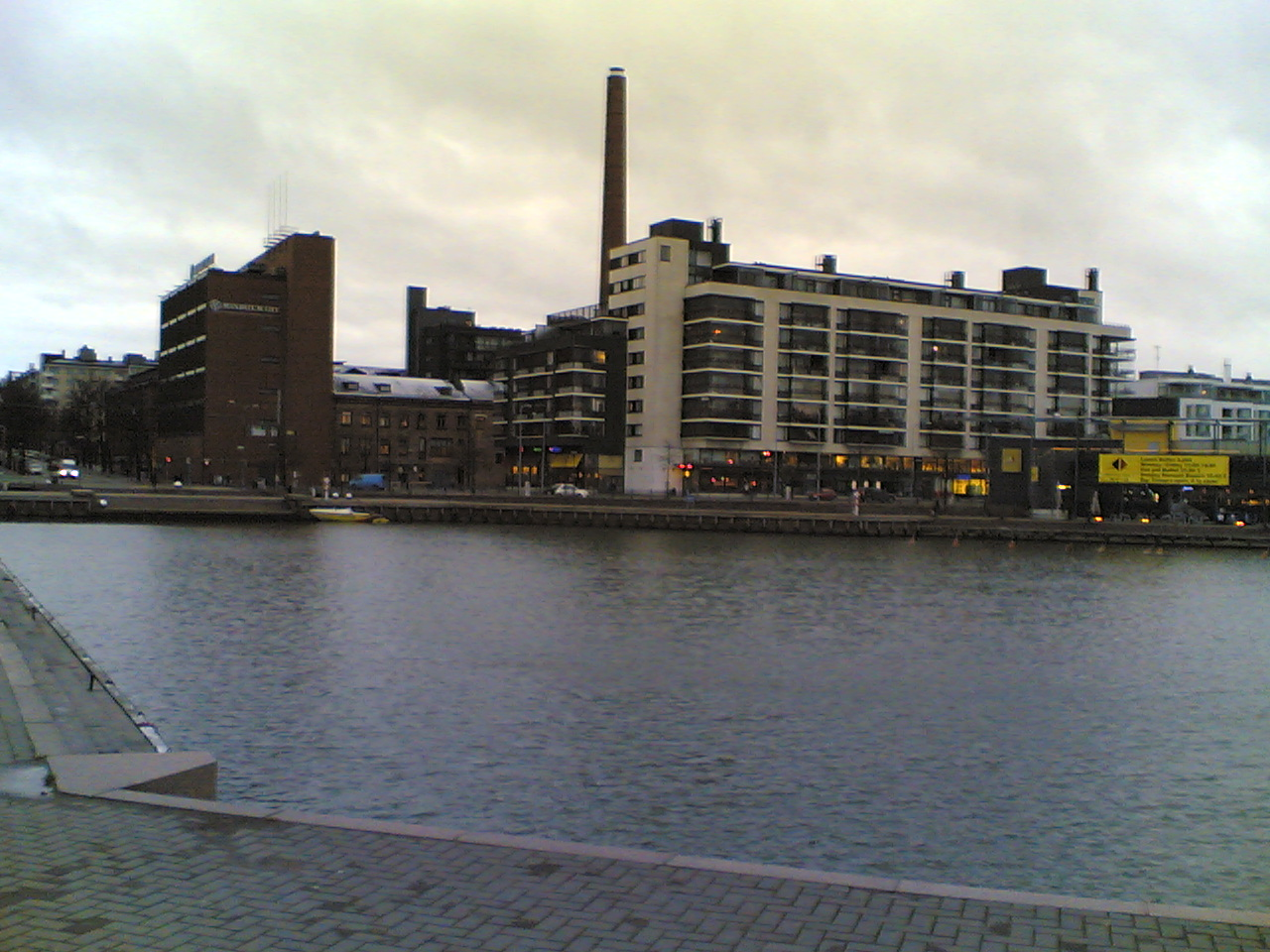
Hietalahdenranta 5

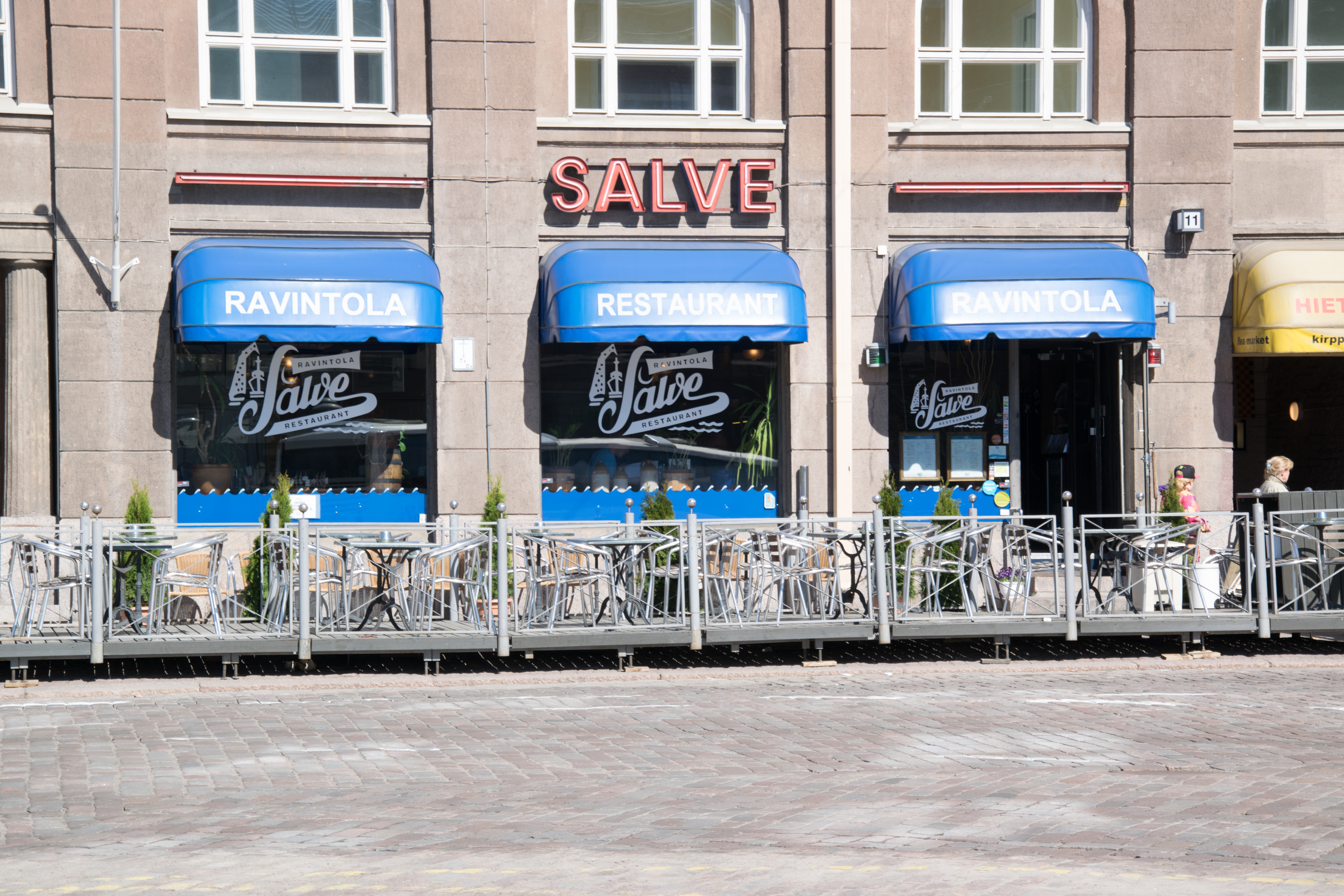
Restaurant Salve at Hietalahdenranta 11 in 2014 before its move.

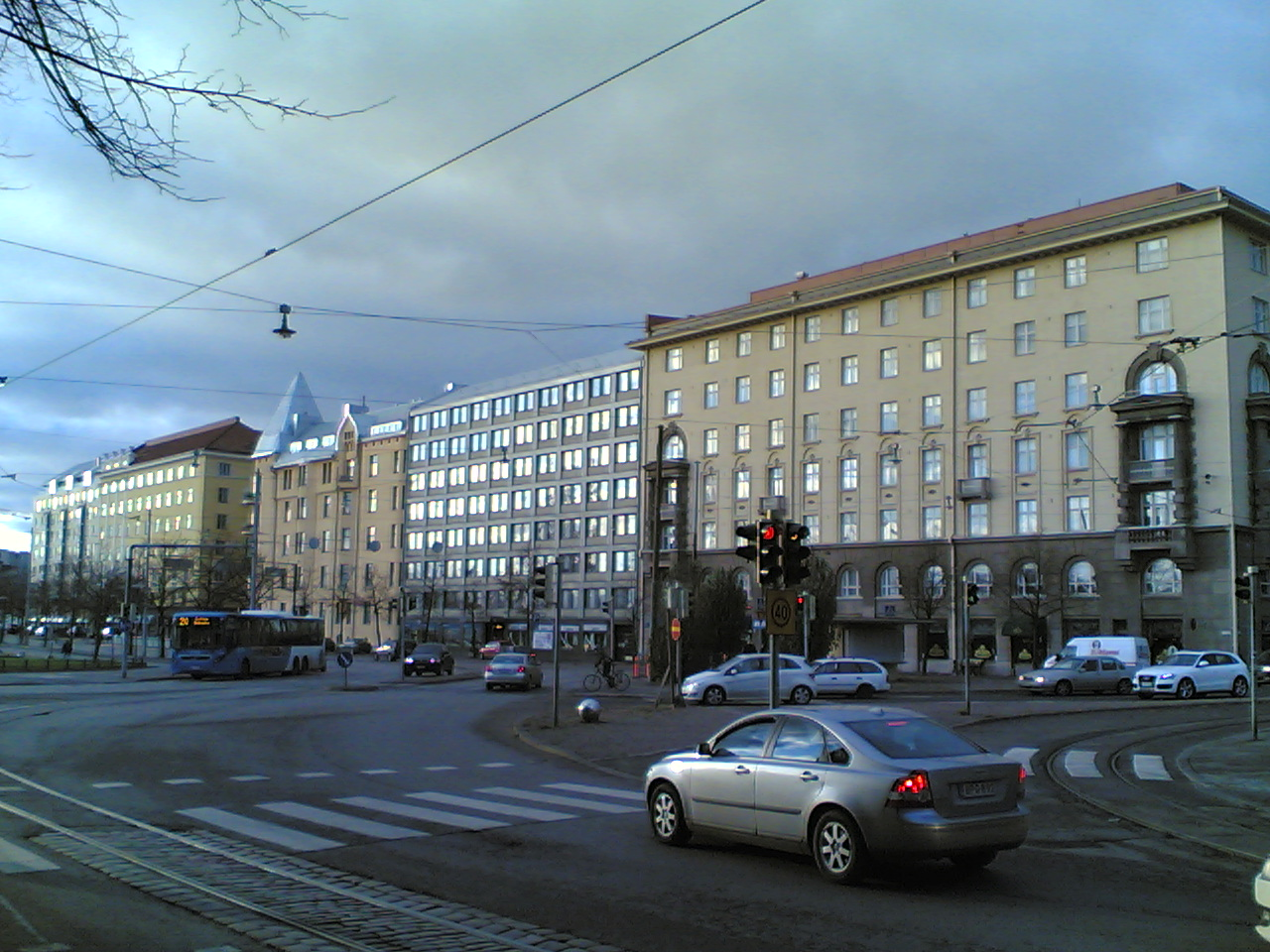
Old buildings on Hietalahdenranta.

Hietalahdenranta connects to the Mallaskatu road tunnel leading to Uudenmaankatu.
