= Shelf =

Shelf (pl.: shelves) may refer to:

- Shelf (storage), a flat horizontal surface used for display and storage

== Geology ==
- Continental shelf, the extended perimeter of a continent, usually covered by shallow seas
- Ice shelf, a thick platform of ice floating on the ocean surface

== Places and entities ==
- Shelf, West Yorkshire, a village in England
- Shelf corporation, a company or corporation that has had no activity
- Shelf (organization), a UK health services organisation

== Other uses ==
- Light shelf, a reflective element placed outside of a window to enhance room illumination by natural light
- Shelf (computing), a user interface feature in the NeXTSTEP operating system
- "Shelf" (song), a 2008 song by the Jonas Brothers
- Shelf life, the length of time that perishable items are considered suitable for sale or consumption
- Shelf registration, a registration arrangement for the sale of securities
- Sulphur shelf, an edible mushroom

== See also ==
- Shelve (disambiguation)
- Off the shelf (disambiguation)
