= Salwa =

Salwa is an Arabic word meaning "solace". It may refer to:

== People ==
- Salwa Abdullah (born 1953), Syrian politician
- Salwa El-Awa, British academic
- Salwa Bakr (born 1949), Egyptian author and critic
- Salwa Bughaighis (1964–2014), Libyan human rights and political activist
- Salwa El-Deghali, Libyan academic
- Salwa Fallouh (1920–2008), Syrian painter and illustrator
- Salwa al-Jassar (born 1957), Kuwaiti politician
- Sally ("Salwa") Shatila Kader, Lebanese-American peace activist
- Salwa Al Katrib (1953–2009), Lebanese singer
- Salwa Abu Khadra (1929-2024), Palestinian politician and educator
- Princess Salwa Aga Khan (born 1988), American model, wife of Prince Rahim Aga Khan
- Salwa Eid Naser (born 1998), Bahraini track sprinter
- Salwa Al Neimi, Syrian writer and feminist
- Salwa Toko (born 1975), French diversity and digital literacy activist
- Salwa Zeidan, Lebanese artist

== Places ==
- Salwa, Kuwait, an area in Hawalli Governorate in Kuwait
- Salwa Kingdom, an ancient Indian kingdom in the Mahabharata
- Salwa, Saudi Arabia, a settlement at the southwest corner of the Gulf of Salwah, endpoint of the Salwa Highway

== Other uses ==
- LORAN-C transmitter Salwa
- Salwa Canal, proposed shipping route through Saudi Arabia along its border with Qatar
- Salwa Judum, an anti-Naxalite movement in Chhattisgarh, India

== See also ==
- Gulf of Salwah, the southern portion of the Gulf of Bahrain
- Salva (disambiguation)
- Salwah, a village in Idlib Governorate, Syria
