= Salva congruitate =

Latin scholastic term

Salva congruitate is a Latin scholastic term in logic which means "without becoming ill-formed", salva meaning rescue, salvation, or welfare and congruitate meaning combine, coincide, or agree. The term is used in logic to mean that two terms may be substituted for each other while preserving grammaticality in all contexts.

== Remarks on salva congruitate ==
=== Timothy C. Potts ===
Timothy C. Potts describes salva congruitate as a form of replacement in the context of meaning. It is a replacement which preserves semantic coherence and should be distinguished from a replacement which preserves syntactic coherence but may yield an expression to which no meaning has been given. This means that supposing an original expression is meaningful, the new expression obtained by the replacement will also be meaningful, though it will not necessarily have the same meaning as the original one, nor, if the expression in question happens to be a proposition, will the replacement necessarily preserve the truth value of the original.

=== Bob Hale ===
Bob Hale explains salva congruitate, as applied to singular terms, as substantival expressions in natural language, which are able to replace singular terms without destructive effect on the grammar of a sentence. Thus the singular term 'Bob' may be replaced by the definite description 'the first man to swim the English Channel' salva congruitate. Such replacement may shift both meaning and reference, and so, if made in the context of a sentence, may cause a change in truth-value. Thus terms which may be interchanged salva congruitate may not be interchangeable salva veritate (preserving truth). More generally, expressions of any type are interchangeable salva congruitate if and only if they can replace one another preserving grammaticality or well-formedness.

== See also ==
- Salva veritate
- Referential opacity
- Crispin Wright
- Peter Geach
