= Salvas =

Salvas may refer to:

== People ==
- Gilles Salvas, Canadian politician
- Lise Salvas-Bronsard (1940–1995), Canadian economist
- Lou Salvas, Australian footballer
- Luc Salvas, Canadian pool player

== Other ==
- Capela de Nossa Senhora das Salvas, chapel in Sines Municipality, Setúbal District, Portugal
- Società Anonima Lavorazioni Vari Appararecchi di Salvataggio, (SALVAS), Italian manufacturer of salvage equipment and diving helmets

== See also ==
- Salva (disambiguation)
