= 010 =

010 may refer to:

- 10
- 8 in octal numeral notation
- Motorola 68010, a microprocessor released by Motorola in 1982
- The telephone area code for Beijing
- 010, the Rotterdam area code
- 010 (The Mad Capsule Markets album), 2001
- 010 (Ulysses album), 2004
- Experiment 010, the codename for Felix, a fictional alien character in the Lilo & Stitch franchise
- Tyrrell 010, a Formula One racing car

== See also ==
- Olo (disambiguation)
- Oio (disambiguation)
