= Salve (restaurant) =

Restaurant in Helsinki, Finland

Coordinates: 60°9′40.37″N 24°55′47.99″E

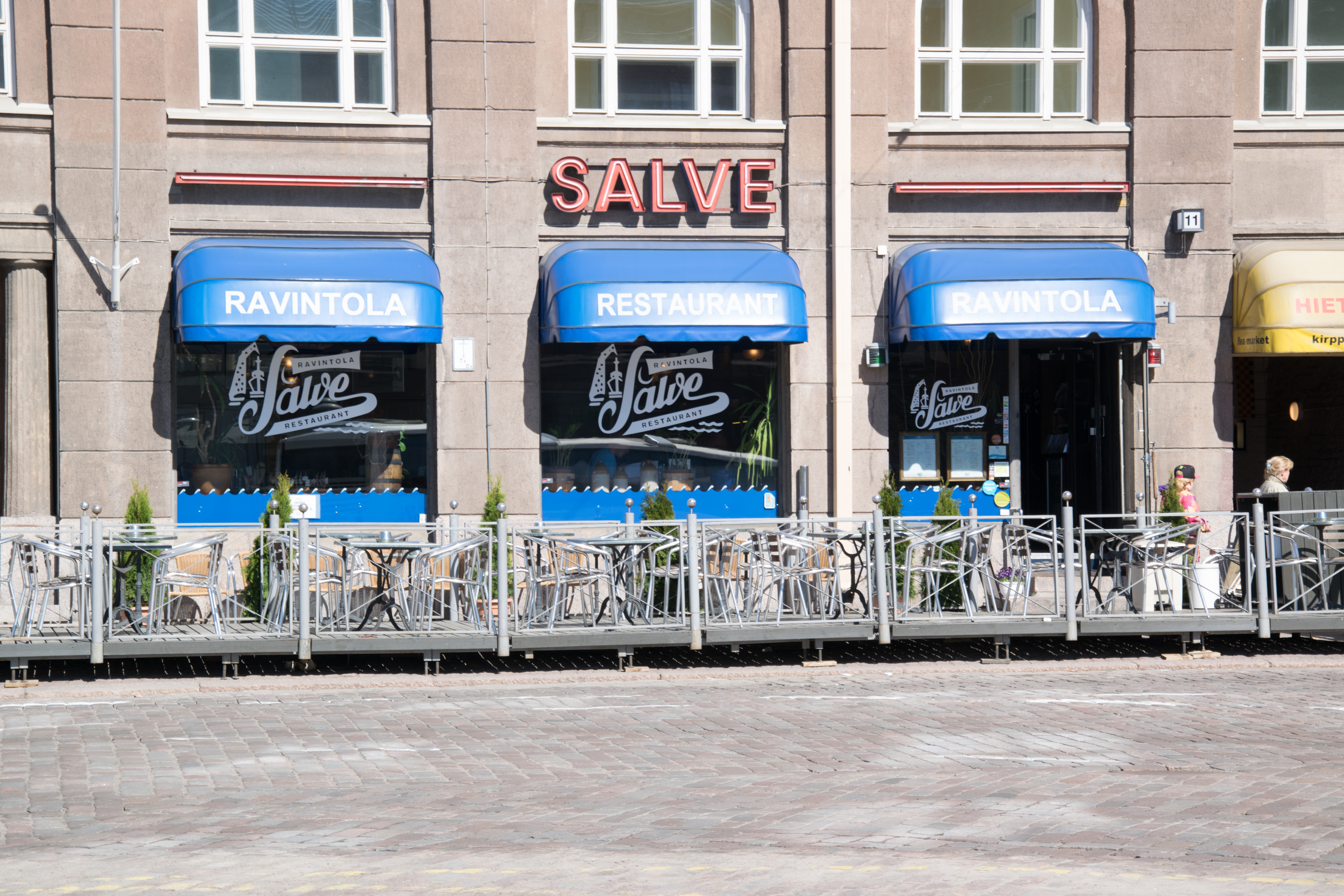
Salve's well known premises in Hietalahti before its move in 2014.

Salve is a restaurant in Helsinki, Finland founded in 1897, which was originally a famous pub among sailors. After the housing cooperative lending the restaurant's premises discontinued its contract in autumn 2016 the restaurant moved to new premises about a hundred metres away on the other side of the street crossing at Hietalahdenranta 5 C.

Salve's first known restaurateurs were Emil and Elin Stenberg. When the high stone building designed by Kaj Eräjuuri's father Eriksson was completed, Salve moved to it.

Salve's location originally hosted a wooden kiosk in the late 19th century, selling food and tobacco to sailors. The house which hosted Salve for a long time was built in 1927. The restaurant is currently owned by HOK-Elanto. Its customers include artists, advertisers, journalists, tourists and workmen.

Salve's classic dish is fried Baltic herring, selling about 60 portions per day. This makes 1800 portions, about 600 kilograms of fish per month. Previously the herrings were gutted by hand in the restaurant kitchen, but nowadays the restaurant gets them already gutted, likewise it also gets its potatoes already peeled. The reason for this is increased demand because of more customers and the small size of the kitchen, which does not have enough space for gutting herrings and peeling potatoes. Other popular dishes include Wiener schnitzel and steak tartare.

The restaurant decor includes paintings depicting sailing and ships, miniature ships, lifebuoys, anchors and other items relating to sailing. This decor is reminiscent of Salve's past as a pub for sailors.

Salve was originally called a café, selling food and coffee. After prohibition in Finland ended Salve received B-class serving rights (beer, cider and wine but no spirits).
