= Morten Michael Kallevig (1842–1936) =

Norwegian businessperson and politician

Morten Michael Kallevig (16 April 1842 – 1936) was a Norwegian businessperson and politician.

He was born in Arendal as a son of consul Emil Kallevig (1807–1889) and Margaretha Dedekam (1809–1883). In 1868 he married Wilhelmine Petrea Franziska Skrike, from Copenhagen. They had the sons Adolf Skrike Kallevig, Julius Skrike Kallevig and Johannes Kallevig who all became businessmen.

Morten Michael Kallevig spent his career as owner of the company Salve Kallevig & Søn, founded by his great-grandfather Salve Johannessøn Kallevig in 1792 and expanded by his grandfather Morten Michael Kallevig. He also owned Tangen farm, the reperbahn Tangen Reperbane and Arendals Tobaksfabrik and was vice consul for the United Kingdom for about fifty years from 1872. This consul position had been inherited from father to son since the early 1800s. Kallevig was also Danish consul until 1907.

He was a board member of Agdesidens Bank, Arendals Sjøforsikringsselskab, Arendals Dampskibsselskab and Nordisk Defence Club, and member of Arendal city council. He was decorated as a Knight, First Class of the Order of St. Olav and the Order of Vasa, and a Knight of the Order of the Dannebrog.
