= Salva veritate =

Logical condition in philosophy

In philosophy, salva veritate (or intersubstitutivity) is the logical condition by which two expressions may be interchanged without altering the truth-value of statements in which the expressions occur. Substitution salva veritate of co-extensional terms can fail in opaque contexts.

The literal translation of the Latin "salva veritate" is "with (or by) unharmed truth", using ablative of manner: "salva" meaning "rescue," "salvation," or "welfare," and "veritate" meaning "reality" or "truth".

== Leibniz ==
The phrase occurs in two fragments from Gottfried Leibniz's General Science. Characteristics:

- In Chapter 19, Definition 1, Leibniz writes: "Two terms are the same (eadem) if one can be substituted for the other without altering the truth of any statement (salva veritate)."
- In Chapter 20, Definition 1, Leibniz writes: "Terms which can be substituted for one another wherever we please without altering the truth of any statement (salva veritate), are the same (eadem) or coincident (coincidentia). For example, 'triangle' and 'trilateral', for in every proposition demonstrated by Euclid concerning 'triangle', 'trilateral' can be substituted without loss of truth (salva veritate)."

== Quine ==
W.V.O. Quine takes substitutivity salva veritate to be the same as the "indiscernibility of identicals". Given a true statement, one of its two terms may be substituted for the other in any true statement and the result will be true. He continues to show that depending on context, the statement may change in value. In fact, the whole quantified modal logic of necessity is dependent on context and empty otherwise; for it collapses if essence is withdrawn.

For example, the statements:

(1)	Giorgione = Barbarelli,
(2)	Giorgione was so-called because of his size

are true; however, replacement of the name 'Giorgione' by the name 'Barbarelli' turns (2) into the falsehood:

Barbarelli was so-called because of his size.

Quine's example here refers to Giorgio Barbarelli's sobriquet "Giorgione", an Italian name roughly glossed as "Big George."

== See also ==
- Propositional attitude
- Referential opacity
- Rule of replacement
- Salva congruitate
- Truth function
- Without loss of generality

== Bibliography ==
- Clarence Irving Lewis, A Survey of Symbolic Logic, Appendix, Dover.
