= Masked-man fallacy =

Formal fallacy about knowledge of objects

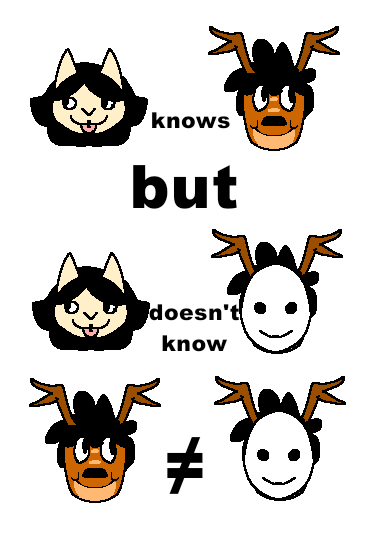
A visual example of the fallacy using anthropomorphic animals

In philosophical logic, the masked-man fallacy (also known as the intensional fallacy or epistemic fallacy) is the false assumption that knowledge or a belief about an object (an intension) can be used to correctly tell it apart from another object (as opposed to facts, that can be used to correctly tell two objects apart). It is committed when one makes an illicit use of Leibniz's law in an argument. Leibniz's law states that if A and B are the same object, then A and B are indiscernible (that is, they have all the same properties). By modus tollens, this means that if one object has a certain property, while another object does not have the same property, the two objects cannot be identical.

== Examples ==
The name of the fallacy comes from the example:

- Premise 1: I know who Claus is.
- Premise 2: I do not know who the masked man is.
- Conclusion: Therefore, Claus is not the masked man.

The premises may be true, yet the conclusion is false if Claus is the masked man and the speaker does not know that. Though the speaker is aware of a large part of Claus's identity, it would not logically follow that Claus is not the masked man, seeing as the speaker cannot account for those parts of Claus's identity that are not known to them. Thus, the argument is a fallacious one. The fallacy results from the speaker's confusion of their own knowledge with complete factuality.

In symbolic form, the above arguments are:

- Premise 1: I know who X is.
- Premise 2: I do not know who Y is.
- Conclusion: Therefore, X is not Y.

Note, however, that this syllogism happens in the reasoning by the speaker "I"; Therefore, in the formal modal logic form, it would be:

- Premise 1: The speaker believes they know who X is.
- Premise 2: The speaker believes they do not know who Y is.
- Conclusion: Therefore, the speaker believes X is not Y.

Premise 1 $\mathcal{B_s}\forall t (t=X\rightarrow K_s(t=X))$ is a very strong one, as it is logically equivalent to $\mathcal{B_s}\forall t (\neg K_s(t=X)\rightarrow t\not=X)$. It is very likely that this is a false belief: $\forall t (\neg K_s(t=X)\rightarrow t\not=X)$ is likely a false proposition, as the ignorance on the proposition $t=X$ does not imply the negation of it is true.

Another example:

- Premise 1: Lois Lane thinks Superman can fly.
- Premise 2: Lois Lane thinks Clark Kent cannot fly.
- Conclusion: Therefore, Superman and Clark Kent are not the same person.

Expressed in doxastic logic, the above syllogism is:

- Premise 1: $\mathcal{B}_{Lois}Fly_{(Superman)}$
- Premise 2: $\mathcal{B}_{Lois}\neg Fly_{(Clark)}$
- Conclusion: $Superman\neq Clark$

The above reasoning is inconsistent (not truth-preserving). The consistent conclusion should be $\mathcal{B}_{Lois}(Superman\neq Clark)$.

The following similar argument is valid:

- X is Z
- Y is not Z
- Therefore, X is not Y

This is valid because being something is different from knowing (or believing, etc.) something. The valid and invalid inferences can be compared when looking at the invalid formal inference:

- X is Z
- Y is Z, or Y is not Z.
- Therefore, X is not Y.

Intension (with an 's') is the connotation of a word or phrase—in contrast with its extension, the things to which it applies. Intensional sentences are often intentional (with a 't'), that is they involve a relation, unique to the mental, that is directed from concepts, sensations, etc., toward objects.

== See also ==
- McNamara fallacy
- Black box
- Eubulides' second paradox
- Identity of indiscernibles
- List of fallacies
- Opaque context
- Transitivity of identity
- Use–mention distinction
- Metonymy
