= United States Federation for Middle East Peace =

The United States Federation for Middle East Peace (USFMEP) is a non-profit, non-partisan organization which promotes the United Nations commitment to international peace and justice through educational programs, public relations and community outreach efforts. The organization was founded in 2001 shortly after 9/11, with the goals of improving the world's understanding of the Middle East.

The USFMEP works to provide Americans with information about the Middle East – its history, religions, cultures and current issues. It seeks to promote understanding of the Middle East through seminars, workshops, roundtables and public forums. It has established networks and liaison offices in other regions of the world to help raise awareness on issues concerning peace in the Middle East utilizing the latest methods in information technology.

== Officers ==
- Ralph Kader – CEO
- Sally Kader – president
- Ahmed Al-Fedaly – vice president

== Board of advisors ==
- Mr. Ralph Kader (chairman): Ralph is a twenty-year veteran of the United Nations. His tenure has included serving on diplomatic missions around the world and working on peace initiatives with the UN Department of Peacekeeping Operations.
- Mrs. Sally Shatila Kader (president): Kader leads efforts to build bridges between the United States and the Arab & Muslim world. She promotes women's rights and children's rights, and serves as the director of the UN Women's Guild in Manhattan.
- Brigadier General Mr. Khalid Kibriya (board member): General Kibriya serves as the secretary-general for the Pakistan Red Crescent Society in Islamabad, Pakistan. He has served with the United Nations Department of Peacekeeping Operations in New York City.
- Dr. Riad Tabbarah (board member): Tabbarah was previously the Lebanese ambassador to the United States. He is director of the Center for Development Studies and Projects and a former member of the United Nations.
- Mariana Thomas (board member): Thomas is an author, social activist, painter, poet, and speaker recognized among the Who's Who of American Women as well as being named in Who's Who in the World in 2005.
- Libby Lloyd (board member): Lloyd is an immediate past president of the UNIFEM Australia and is now representative for UNIFEM Australia's International Relations. UNIFEM is the United Nations Development Fund for Women, the Women's Fund at the UN. She has been active over time promoting women's human rights and political participation around the world.
