= Murat Selvi =

Belgian footballer

Personal information
- Date of birth: 10 July 1982 (age 44)
- Place of birth: Maasmechelen, Belgium
- Height: 1.76 m (5 ft 9 1/2 in)
- Position: Left back

Senior career*
| Years | Team | Apps | (Gls) |
| –2003 | KFC Dessel Sport | | |
| 2003–2005 | Maasmechelen | | |
| 2005–2008 | Hacettepespor | 59 | (2) |
| 2008–2012 | Karabükspor | 25 | (0) |
| 2012 | Elazığspor | 9 | (0) |
| 2012–2013 | Bandırmaspor | 2 | (0) |
| 2013–2015 | Gölbaşıspor | 36 | (1) |
| 2015–2016 | Erdekspor | | |
- * Club domestic league appearances and goals

Murat Selvi (born 10 July 1982) is a Belgian former professional footballer who played as a defender.
