= Salva Nos =

Salva Nos (Latin, 'Save Us') may refer to:

- Salva Nos (album), by Mediæval Bæbes, and the title track
- "Salva Nos", a song by Yuki Kajiura from the anime TV series Noir
