= Hietalahti, Helsinki =

Quarter in Helsinki, Finland

Coordinates: 60°9′45″N 24°55′45″E

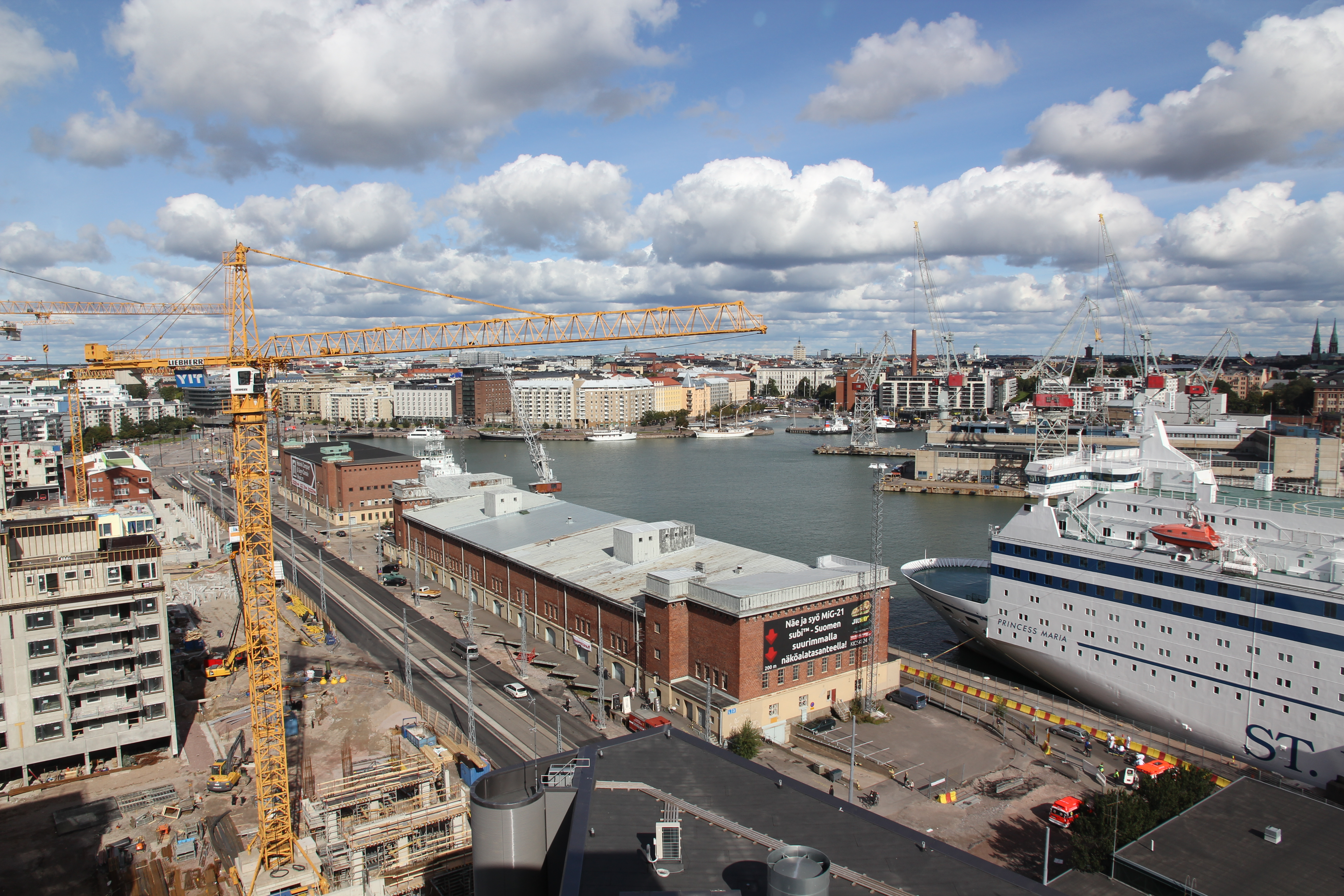
Hietalahti from on top of the Verkkokauppa.com building

Hietalahti (Swedish: Sandviken) is the southernmost section of the Kamppi neighborhood the city of Helsinki, Finland. A notable feature is the Hietalahti shipyard.

Hietalahti's borders are the seaside, Mechelininkatu, Ruoholahdenkatu, Albertinkatu, Bulevardi. It is located between Ruoholahti and Jätkäsaari to the West, the rest of Kamppi to the North, and Punavuori to the East.

Hietalahti's main attractions include Helsinki's most popular flea market, the Hietalahti market hall, a luxurious hotel and a couple of seafood-themed restaurants. The Helsinki International Bible Center and a Hare Krishna organisation are also located in the area. The outdoor sculpture Olo n:o 22 can be found around the harbour basin.

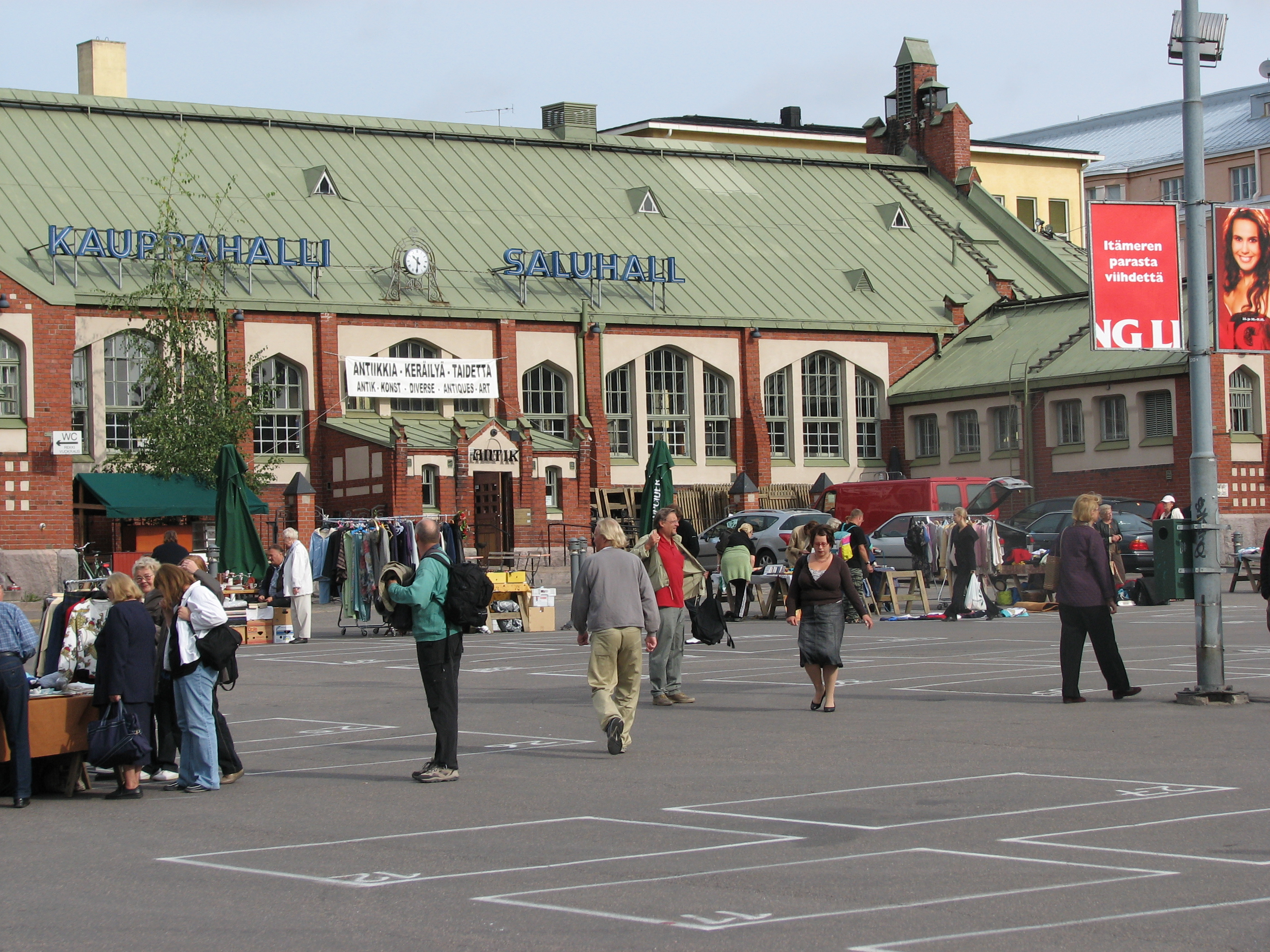
Hietalahti market square

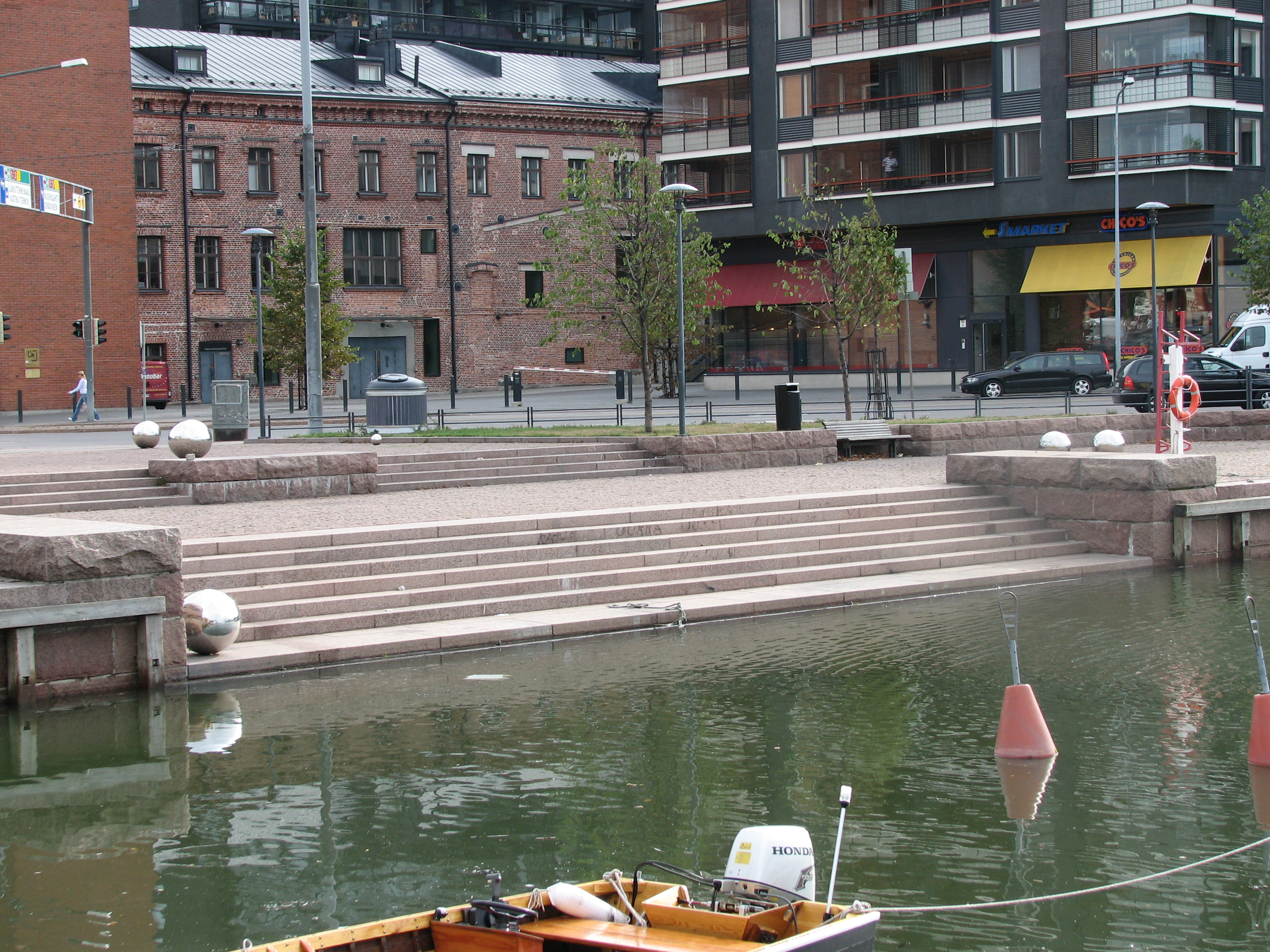
Part of Olo n:o 22.

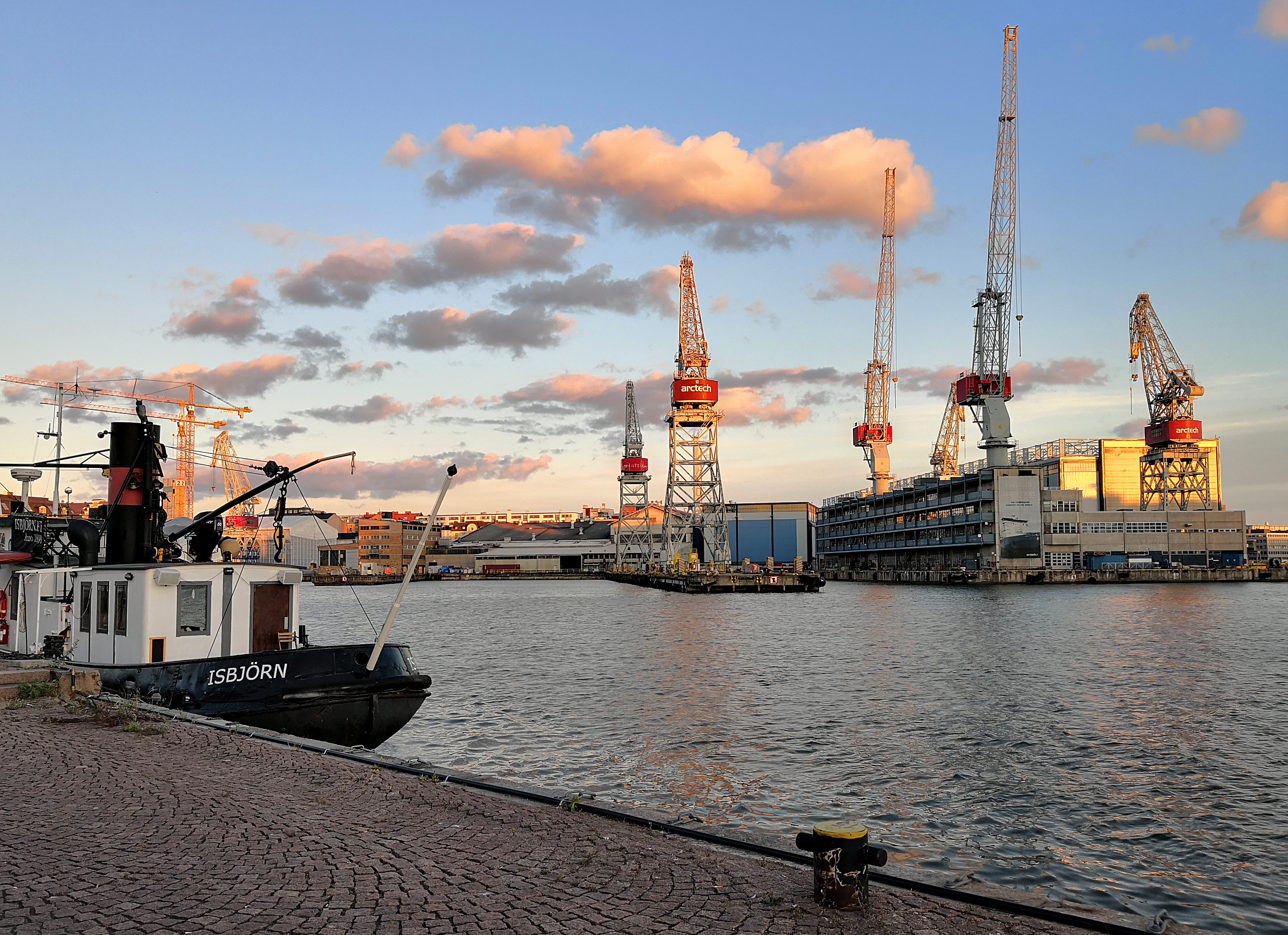
Hietalahti shipyard

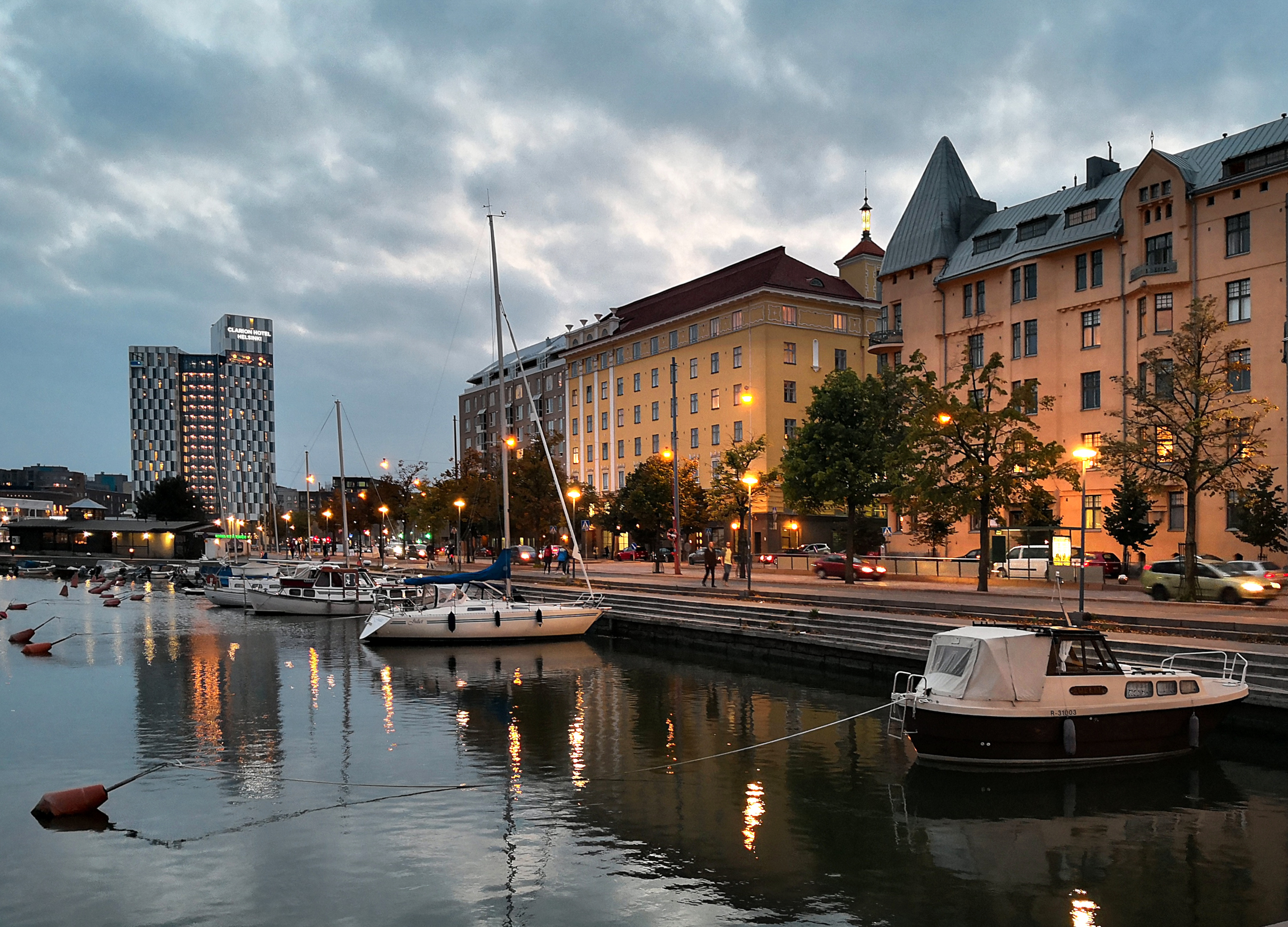
Hietalahti on a summer evening

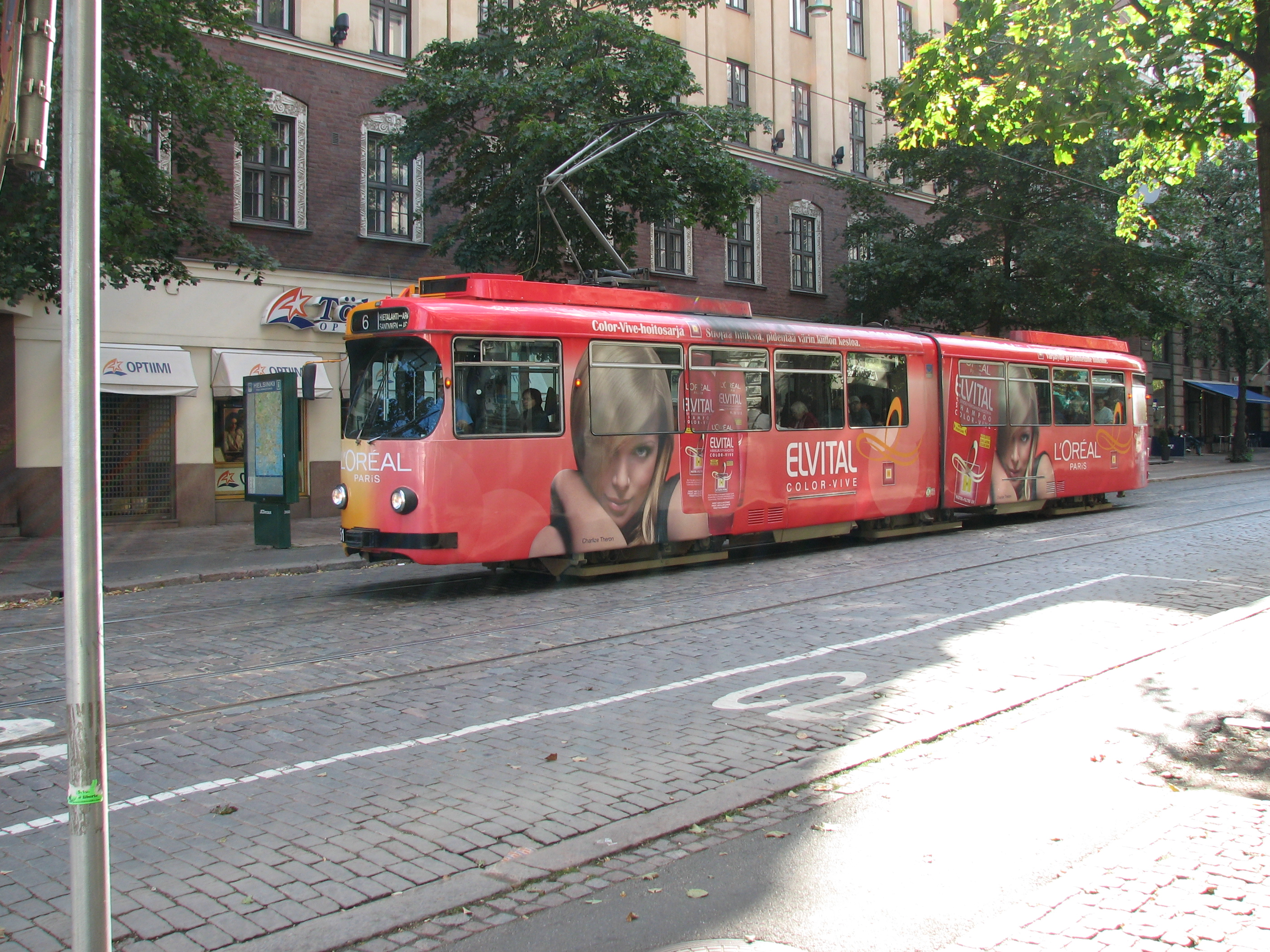
Tram number 6 traverses from Hietalahti to Arabianranta

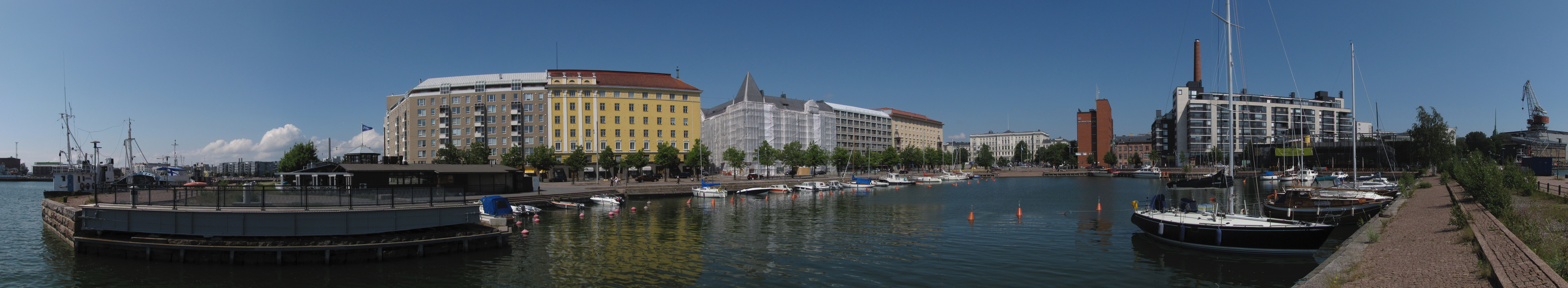
Hietalahti basin

== See also ==
- Hietalahdenranta
