= Salve Kallevig & Søn =

Trade and shipping company

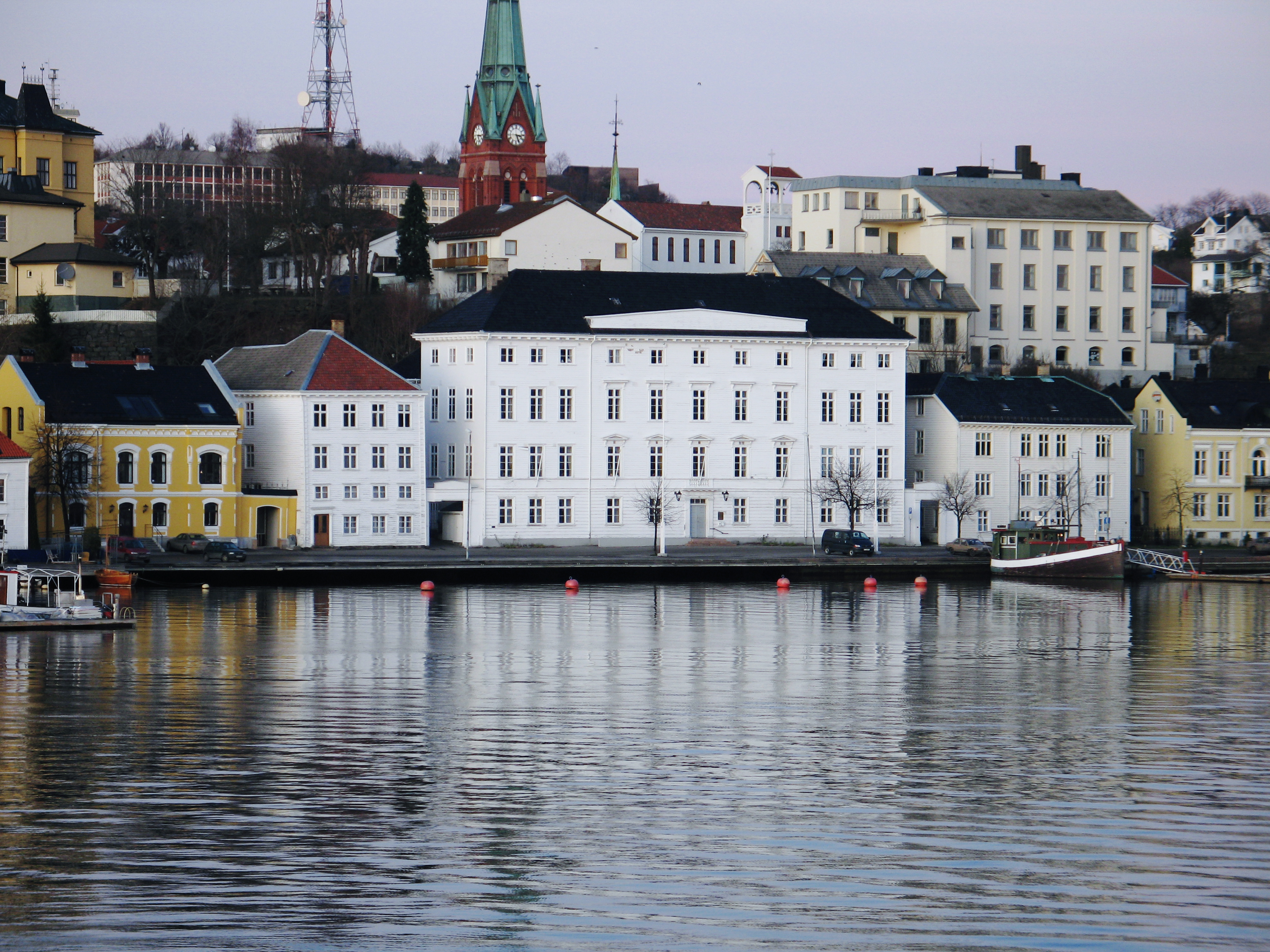
Kallevig Building in Arendal

Salve Kallevig & Søn was a trade and shipping company located in the port city of Arendal in Agder, Norway.

Salve Kallevig & Søn was founded in Arendal in 1792 by Salve Johannessøn Kallevig. During the 19th century, Arendal was a major shipping centre. The company was passed down to the son of the founder, Morten Michael Kallevig who expanded the company. They traded timber and other goods, and owned several ships. Morten Michael Kallevig also raised the Kallevig Building, which was used as Arendal's city hall for some time. The last owner was Johannes Salve Kallevig (1879–1962), son of Morten Michael Kallevig, Jr. When Johannes Salve Kallevig died in 1962, the company was dissolved.
