= Morten Michael Kallevig (1772–1827) =

Morten Michael Kallevig (1772 – 8 May 1827) was a Norwegian businessperson.

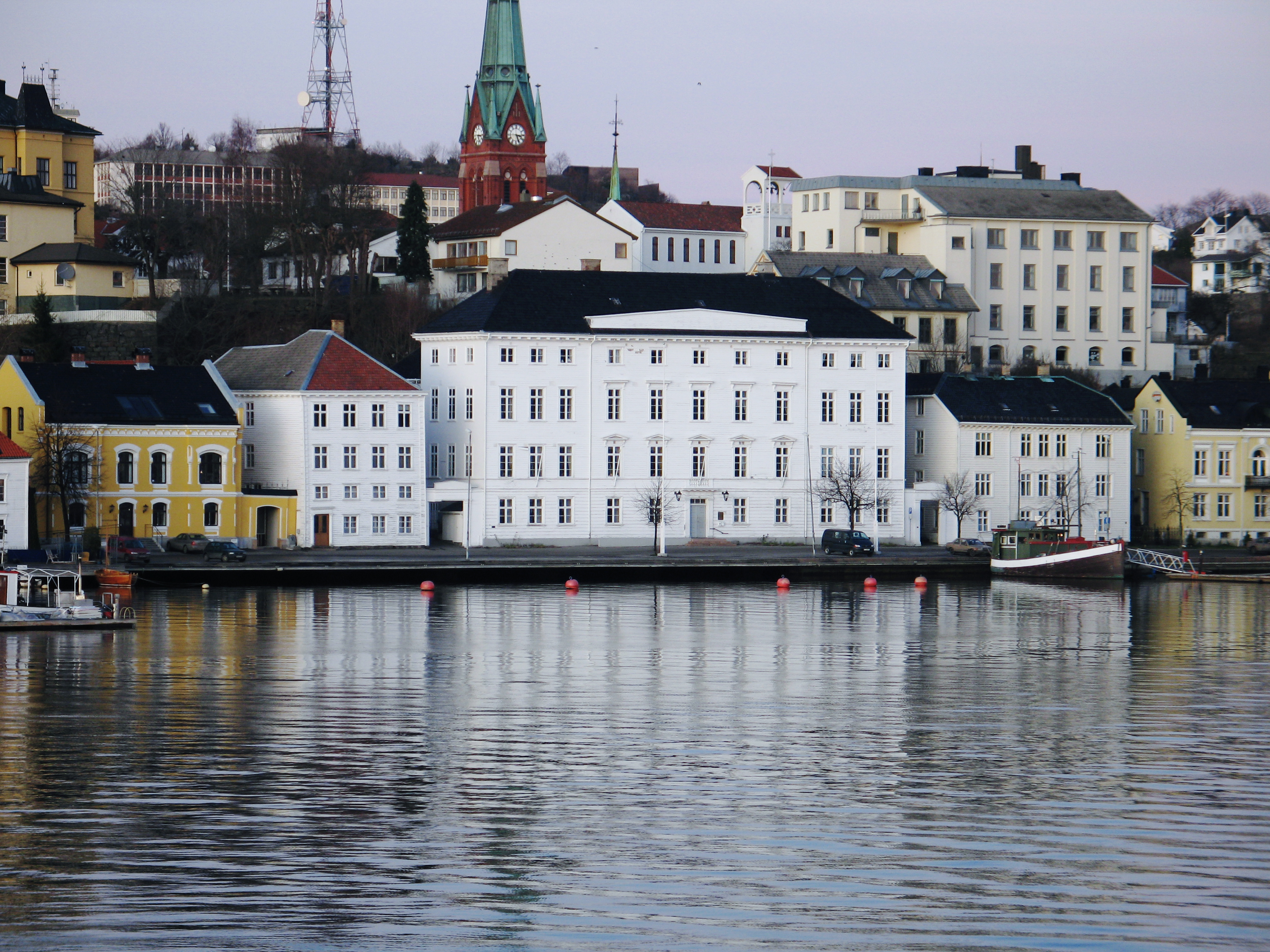
Kalleviggården

He is best known as the owner of the trading and shipping company Salve Kallevig & Søn, which was founded by his father Salve Johannessøn Kallevig (1732–1794) in 1792, two years before he died. The company was passed down through the generations, and existed until 1962.

Morten Michael Kallevig acquired burghership in Arendal in 1794, and served as vice consul for France and the Hansa League. He is also known for raising Kalleviggården as his private residence in Arendal. In 1844, his widow sold her house to the municipality of Arendal which used it as a town hall for many years.

He was married to Cathrine Helmer Leth (1773-1869). Their daughter Mathilde Sophie Kallevig (1805-1829) married Nicolai Benjamin Aall (1805-1888), a son of Jacob Aall. Their son Emil Kallevig (1807-1889) was the father of Morten Michael Kallevig, Jr. (1842–1936), who in turn was the father of Johannes Salve Kallevig (1879–1962), the last owner of Salve Kallevig & Søn.
