= Salve Johannessøn Kallevig =

Norwegian businessman

Salve Johannessøn Kallevig (1732 – 4 February 1794) was a Norwegian businessperson. He is best known for founding the trading and shipping company Salve Kallevig & Søn in 1792, which was largely expanded by his son Morten Michael Kallevig. The company was passed down through the generations, and existed until 1962.
