= Olo n:o 22 =

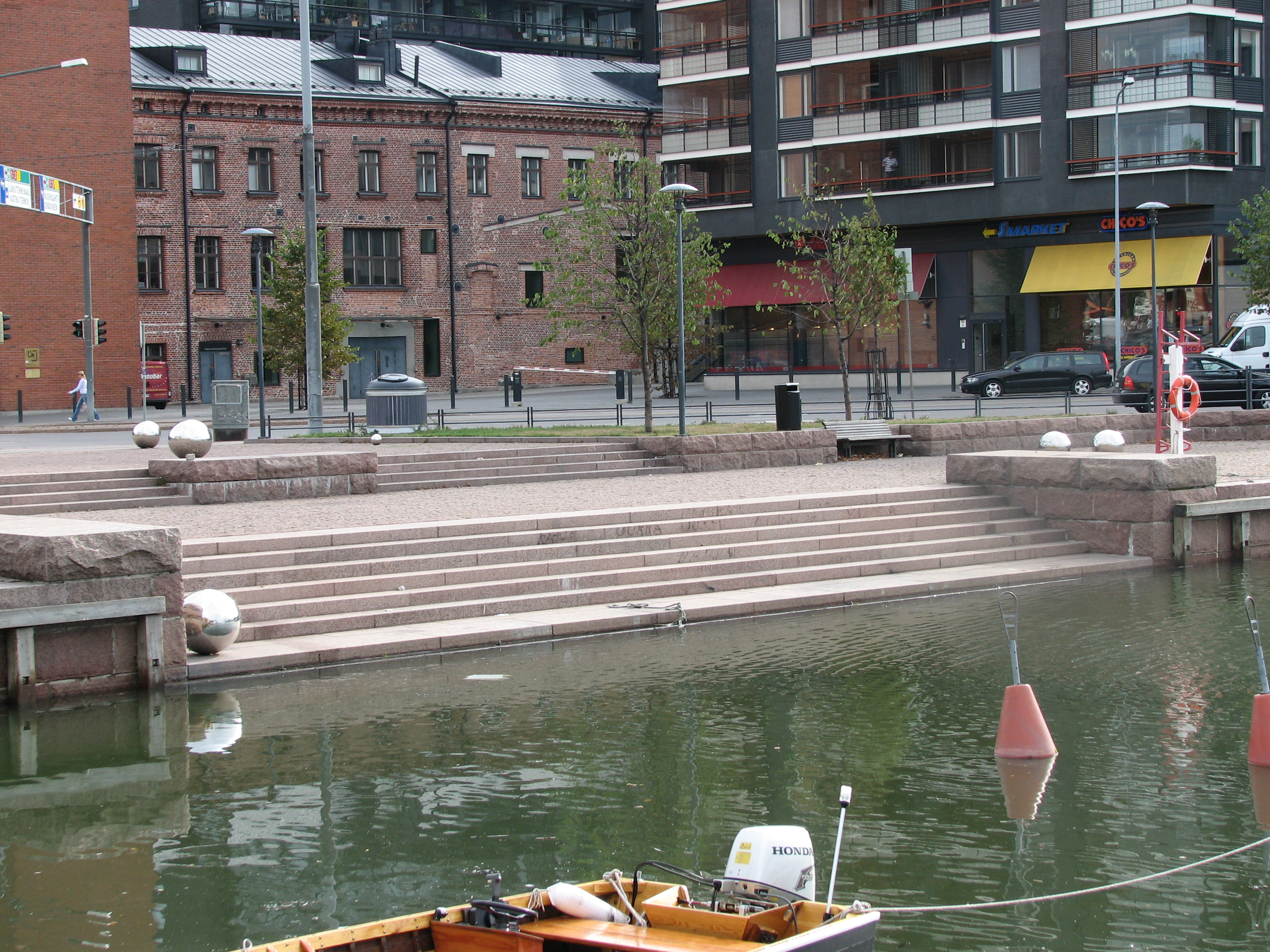
Part of Olo n:o 22.

Olo n:o 22 is an outdoor sculpture in Hietalahti, Helsinki, Finland.

'Olo no. 22' was unveiled on July 25, 2000, and it is currently part of the esteemed collection of the Helsinki Art Museum. The sculpture consists of over 50 polished steel spheres of various sizes, strategically placed in the vicinity of the harbor basin at the western end of Bulevardi.

The sculpture was the winning entry in an invited competition held in the late 1990s for installations to be situated in the Hietalahti area. The esteemed jury praised the Olo Group, the collective of artists responsible for 'Olo no. 22', for their innovative approach that considered the distinctive character and heavy traffic of the area. What set the sculpture apart was its ability to transcend the conventional notion of public monuments by incorporating spheres within businesses and courtyards, thereby inviting interpretation and defying traditional notions of monumentality. The artwork does not have a definitive beginning or end, but rather maintains a continuous presence in the area.

'Olo no. 22' was unveiled on July 25, 2000, and it is currently part of the esteemed collection of the Helsinki Art Museum.
