= Rev, Nagorno-Karabakh =

Rev / Shalva Ռև / Şəlvə
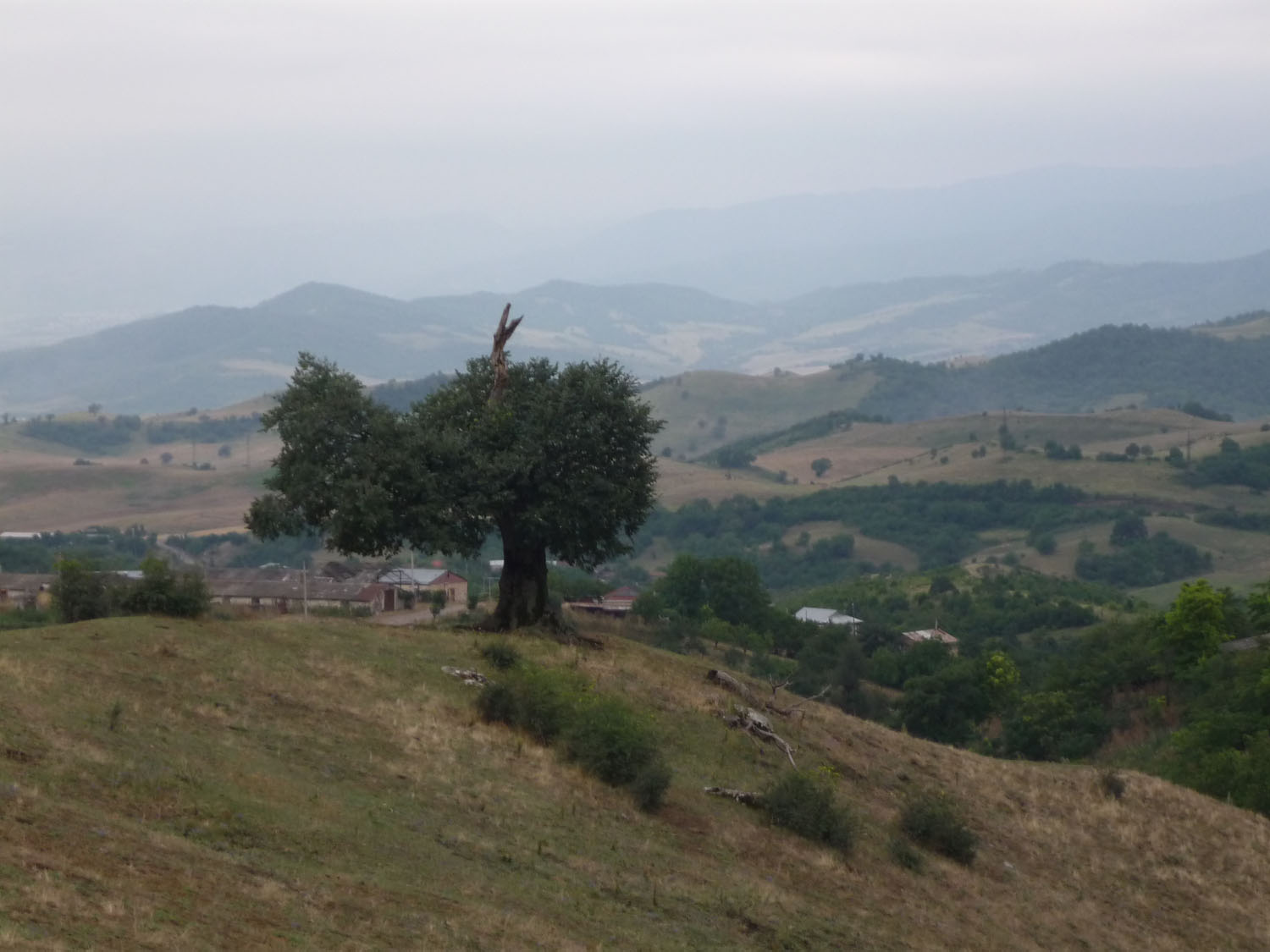

- Location within Azerbaijan Location within Karabakh Economic Region
- Coordinates: 39°59′09″N 46°42′50″E
- Country: Azerbaijan
  - District: Khojaly
- Elevation: 984 m (3,228 ft)

Population (2015)
  - Total: 110
- Time zone: UTC+4 (AZT)

Rev (Armenian: Ռև, also Rrev) or Shalva (Azerbaijani: Şəlvə) is a village in the Khojaly District of Azerbaijan, in the region of Nagorno-Karabakh. Until 2023 it was controlled by the breakaway Republic of Artsakh. The village had an ethnic Armenian-majority population until the expulsion of the Armenian population of Nagorno-Karabakh by Azerbaijan following the 2023 Azerbaijani offensive in Nagorno-Karabakh.

== History ==
During the Soviet period, the village was a part of the Askeran District of the Nagorno-Karabakh Autonomous Oblast.

== Historical heritage sites ==
Historical heritage sites in and around the village include an 18th/19th-century cemetery, St. Stephen's Church (Armenian: Սուրբ Ստեփանոս եկեղեցի, romanized: Surb Stepanos Yekeghetsi) built in 1894, and a 19th-century spring monument.

== Economy and culture ==
The population is mainly engaged in agriculture and animal husbandry. As of 2015, the village has a municipal building, a house of culture, and a medical centre. Students study in the secondary school of the neighboring village of Tsaghkashat.

== Demographics ==
The village has an ethnic Armenian-majority population. It had 113 inhabitants in 2005, and 110 inhabitants in 2015.

== Gallery ==
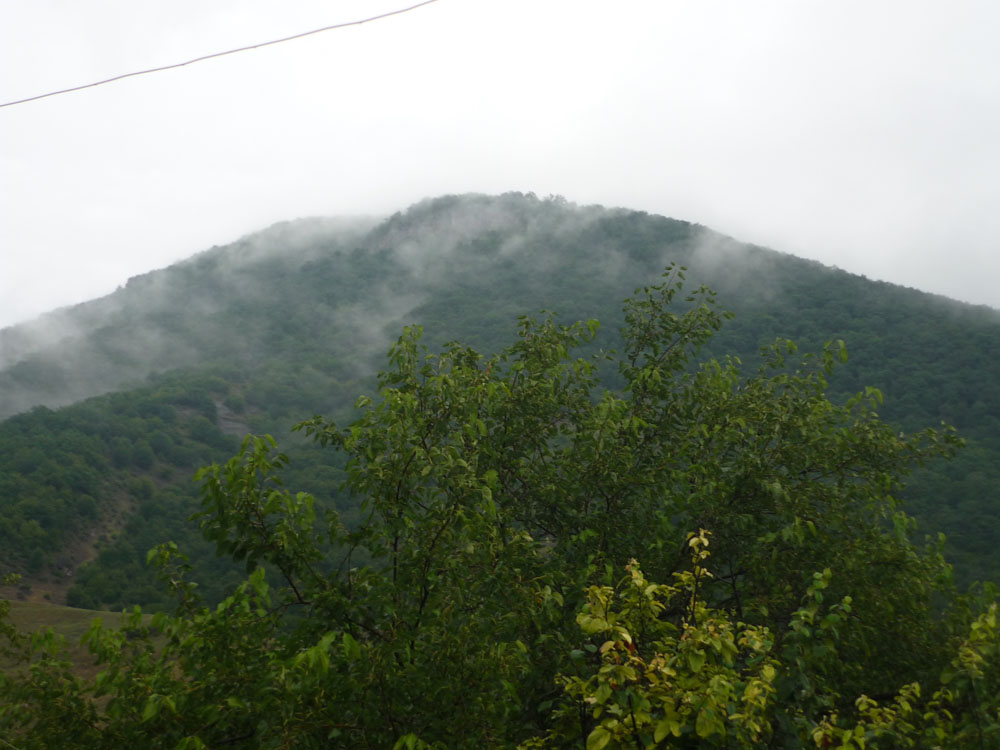
Scenery

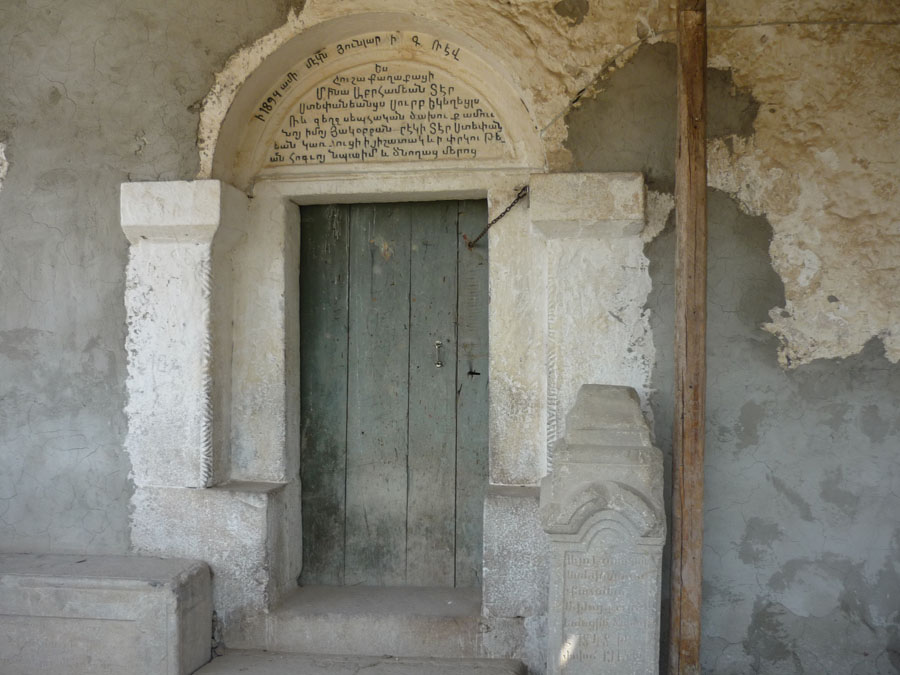
St. Stephen's Church

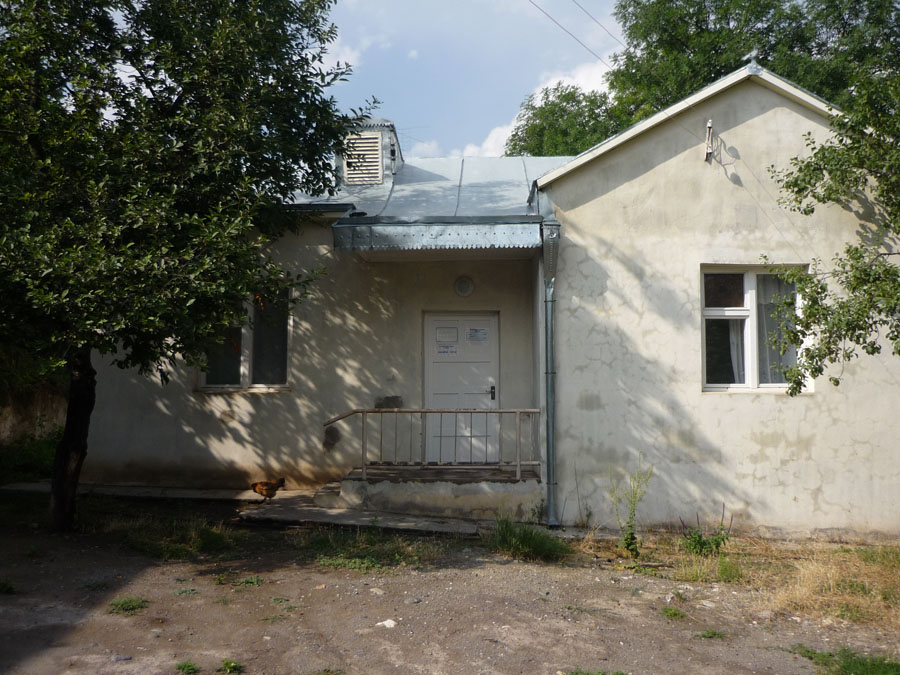
Municipal building

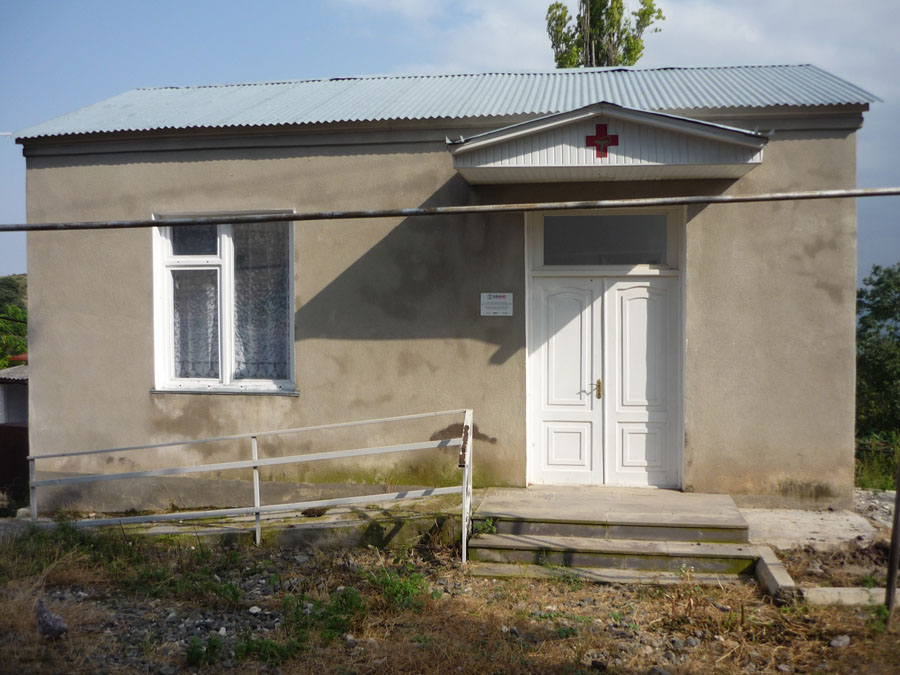
First aid station

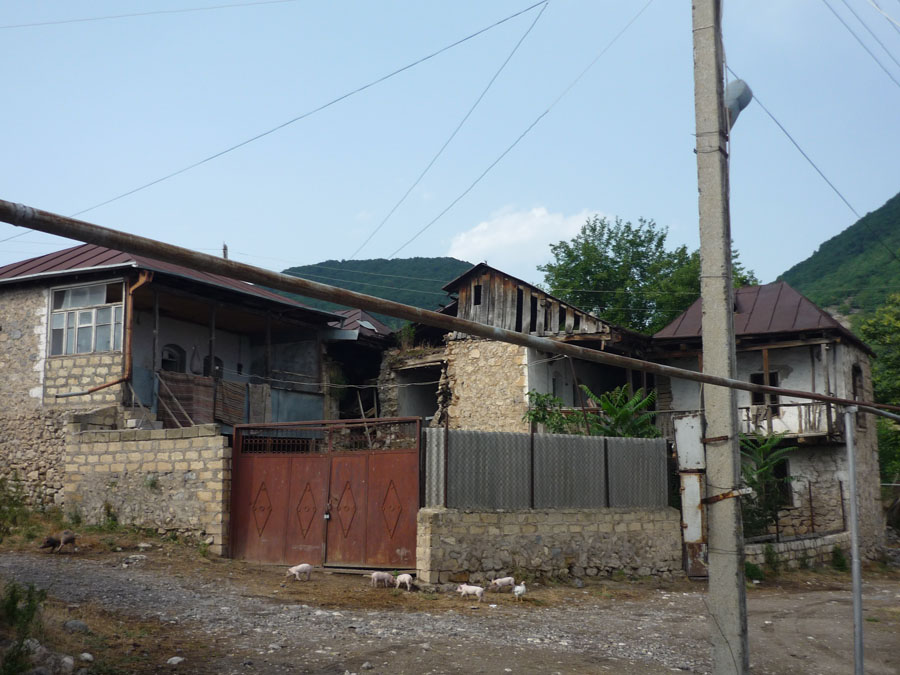
Buildings in the village

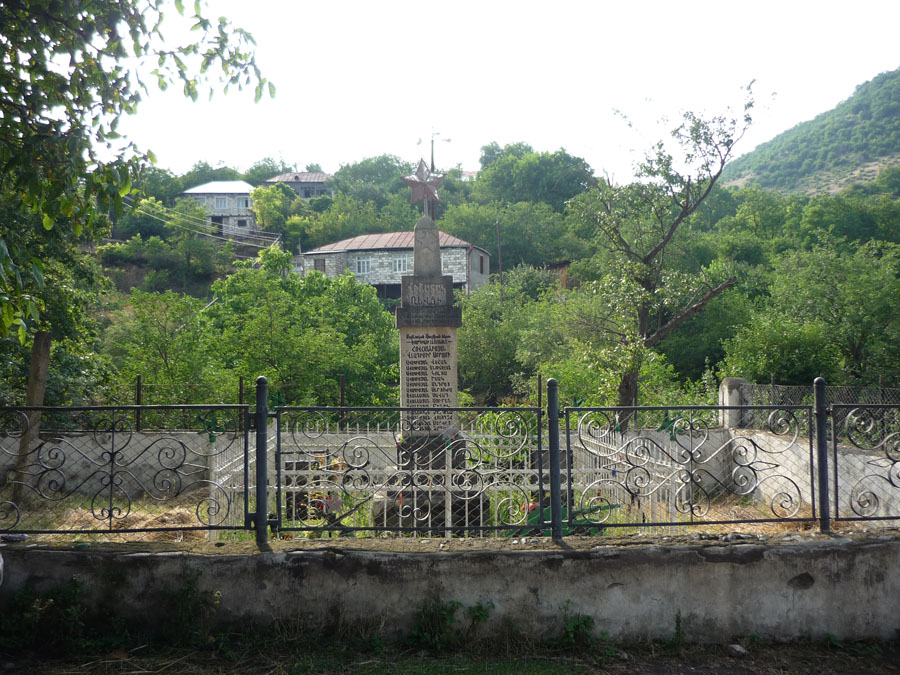
WWII memorial
