= Salve Hodne =

Norwegian businessperson and politician

Salve Thomassen Hodne (28 September 1845 – 22 February 1916) was a Norwegian businessperson and politician.

He was elected to the Parliament of Norway in 1889, and was re-elected in 1895, 1898 and 1900, representing the constituency of Kristiansand. He worked as a shipyard owner in that city.
