= Şəlvə, Lachin =

Şəlvə
- Location within Azerbaijan Location within East Zangezur Economic Region
- Coordinates: 39°50′08″N 46°17′56″E
- Country: Azerbaijan
- District: Lachin

Population (2015)
  - Total: 55
- Time zone: UTC+4 (AZT)

Şəlvə (Shalva) is a village in the Lachin District of Azerbaijan.

== History ==
The village was located in the Armenian-occupied territories surrounding Nagorno-Karabakh, coming under the control of ethnic Armenian forces during the First Nagorno-Karabakh War in the early 1990s. The village subsequently became part of the breakaway Republic of Artsakh as part of its Kashatagh Province, where it was known as Shalua (Armenian: Շալուա). It was returned to Azerbaijan as part of the 2020 Nagorno-Karabakh ceasefire agreement.

== Historical heritage sites ==
Historical heritage sites in and around the village include a grave field from between the 1st and 13th centuries, a medieval bridge, a 12th/13th-century khachkar, a tombstone from 1629, two 17th-century tombstones, five 17th-century khachkars, a 17th/18th-century stele, and the 17th-century church of Poghos-Petros (Armenian: Պողոս-Պետրոս).
