= Beer in Finland =

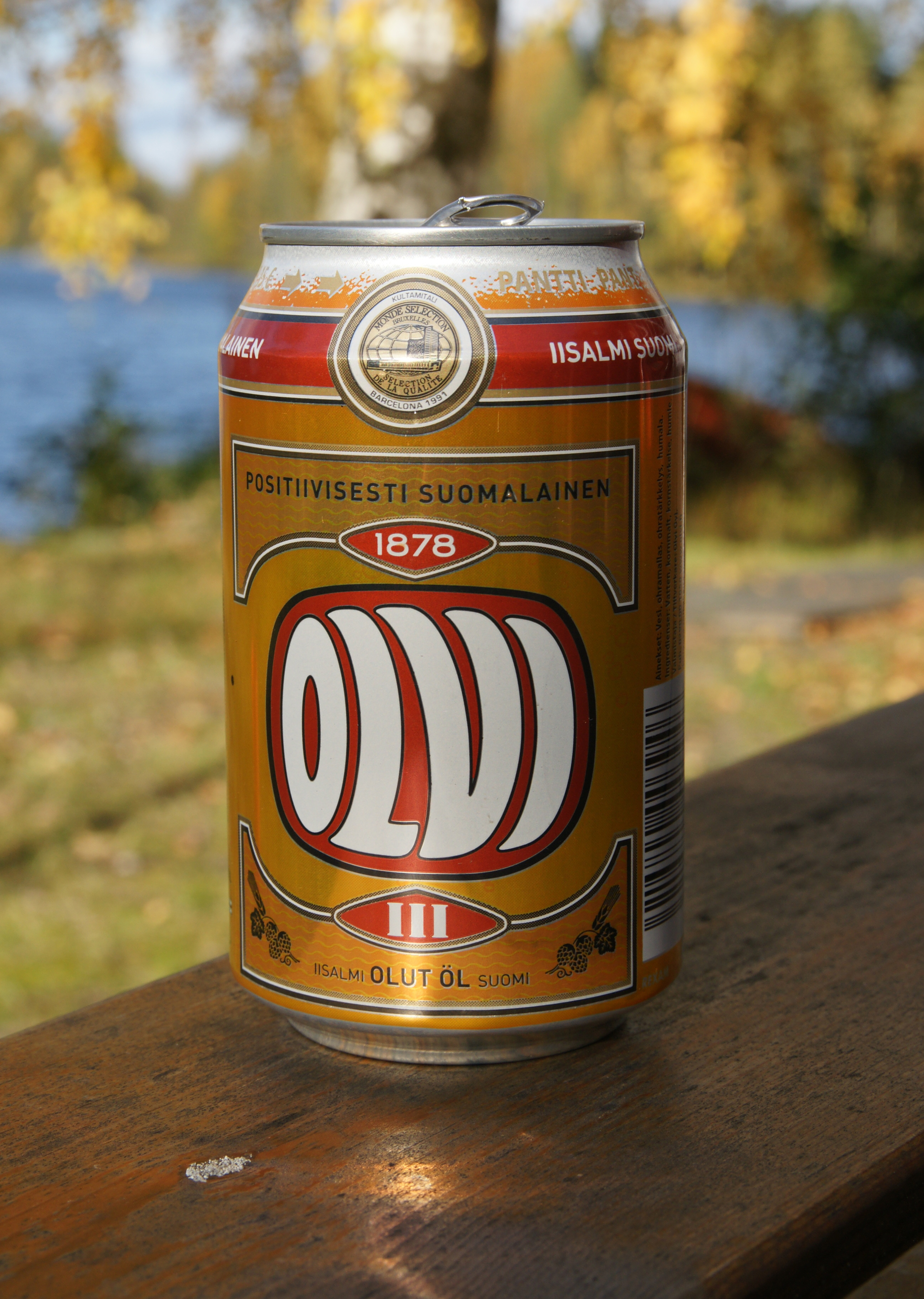
Can of Finnish Olvi beer

Finland has a long history of beer (Finnish: olut) dating back to the Middle Ages. The oldest still-existing commercial brewery in Finland and the other Nordic countries is Sinebrychoff, founded in 1819. The Finnish Beer Day (suomalaisen oluen päivä) is celebrated on 13 October to commemorate the founding of the Sinebrychoff brewery and the birth of Finnish beer. The largest Finnish brewers are Hartwall, Olvi and Sinebrychoff. Most of the beers brewed in Finland are pale lagers. As of 2022, Finland's standing is 23rd in per capita consumption of beer: Finnish people consume 70.2 litres (15.4 imp gal; 18.5 US gal) of beer annually per capita, while the total annual consumption is 393 million litres (86,000,000 imp gal; 104,000,000 US gal).

== Sahti ==
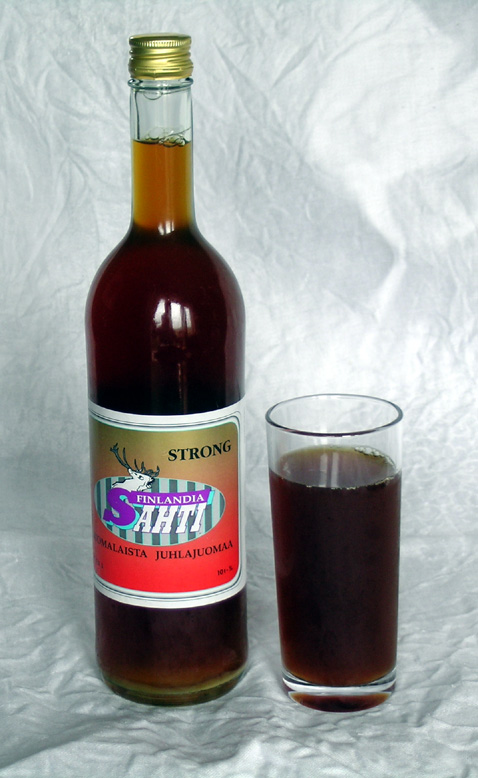
Finlandia sahti

Sahti is a traditional Finnish farmhouse ale, made mostly with rye and barley malts, but sometimes also oats, and filtered through straw or juniper twigs. The modern version has a distinct banana flavor from the bread yeast used to ferment it. It was often praised in the writings of the beer connoisseur Michael Jackson. Although less common today, it is still served at weddings and other special occasions. There are also a few commercial producers.

== Finnish beer tax-classes ==
Beer was classified into tax classes by law in Finland until the year 1995 when Finland joined the European Union. After joining the EU the law was reformed so that the tax is set directly by the percentage of alcohol by volume contained in the product: with 0.5–2.8% beers €0.02/cl of alcohol, with beers over 2.8% €0.0214/cl. However, the old classifications are still voluntarily used widely and the old tax classes are still often marked on the products and advertisements.

	Percentage by volume	Sold in restaurants	Sold in stores	Notes
I beer	0.0–2.8%	Yes	Yes	does not require a license
II beer	2.8–3.7%	Yes	Yes	not usually used in Finland; however, it is used in Sweden
III beer	3.7–4.7%	Yes	Yes	known as "keskiolut" (literally "middle beer" or medium-strength beer), "kolmosolut" or "kolmonen", the most popular class of beer in Finland
IVA beer	4.8–5.2%	Yes	Yes	steep taxation before the 1995 reform, usually sold as Export beers
IVB beer	5.2–8.0%	Yes	Yes	steep taxation before the 1995 reform, usually sold as Export beers, law changed in 1/2018 to allow any alcohol up to 5.5% to be sold in stores

Until June 2024, beer with an alcohol content of 5.6% or higher could only be sold in state-owned Alko liquor stores or bars and restaurants with the appropriate license. It is also sold in tax free shops on Baltic Sea cruiseferries. Because of tax regulations, the tax free shops may only be open when the ships are either on international waters or visiting Åland (which has special exempt status in the EU).

In June 2024, the alcohol law changed to allow for beer with an alcohol content up to 8.0% to be sold in stores. Beer with an alcohol content of 8.1% or higher may still only be sold in Alko stores, bars and restaurants, or at tax-free shops on cruiseferries.

== Finnish beer market ==
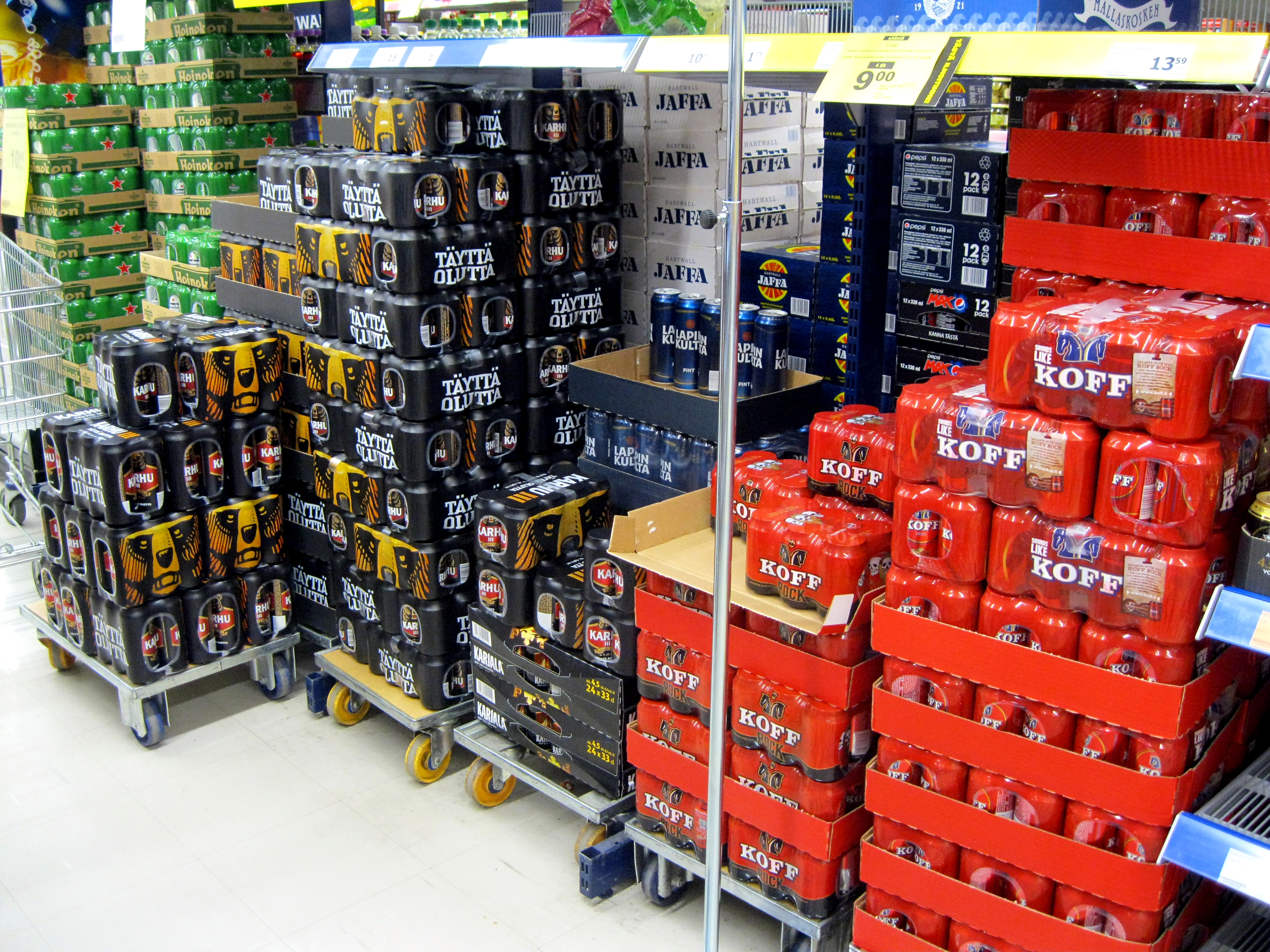
Selection of Finnish beers

Finland's beer market has been described as international rather than local. The market leader is Denmark's Carlsberg Group, owner of the Finnish brewery Sinebrychoff, with a market share of 46.9%. Its beer brands include Koff and Karhu. Carlsberg is followed by Heineken International, which controls - through its Hartwall brewery - a 29.5% share of the national market and produces the Lapin Kulta and Karjala brands. Olvi is the largest Finnish-owned brewery, holding approximately a further 20% of the Finnish market. The rest of the Finnish breweries are smallish regionals or microbreweries, all founded post-1985. As of 2017, there are 85 microbreweries in the country. Craft breweries are allowed to sell their products directly to consumers.

== Prohibition ==
Prohibition started in Finland on 1 June 1919 and lasted nearly 13 years, during which the production, import, sales, transportation and storage of alcohol products was only allowed for medicinal, scientific, and technical purposes. A referendum on the continuation of prohibition was held starting on the 29th and closing on 30 December 1931. The referendum closed with a 70% majority against the law and resulted in the end of prohibition on 5 April 1932 at 10:00 when the new state-owned alcohol retail stores opened their doors to customers.

== Finnish breweries ==
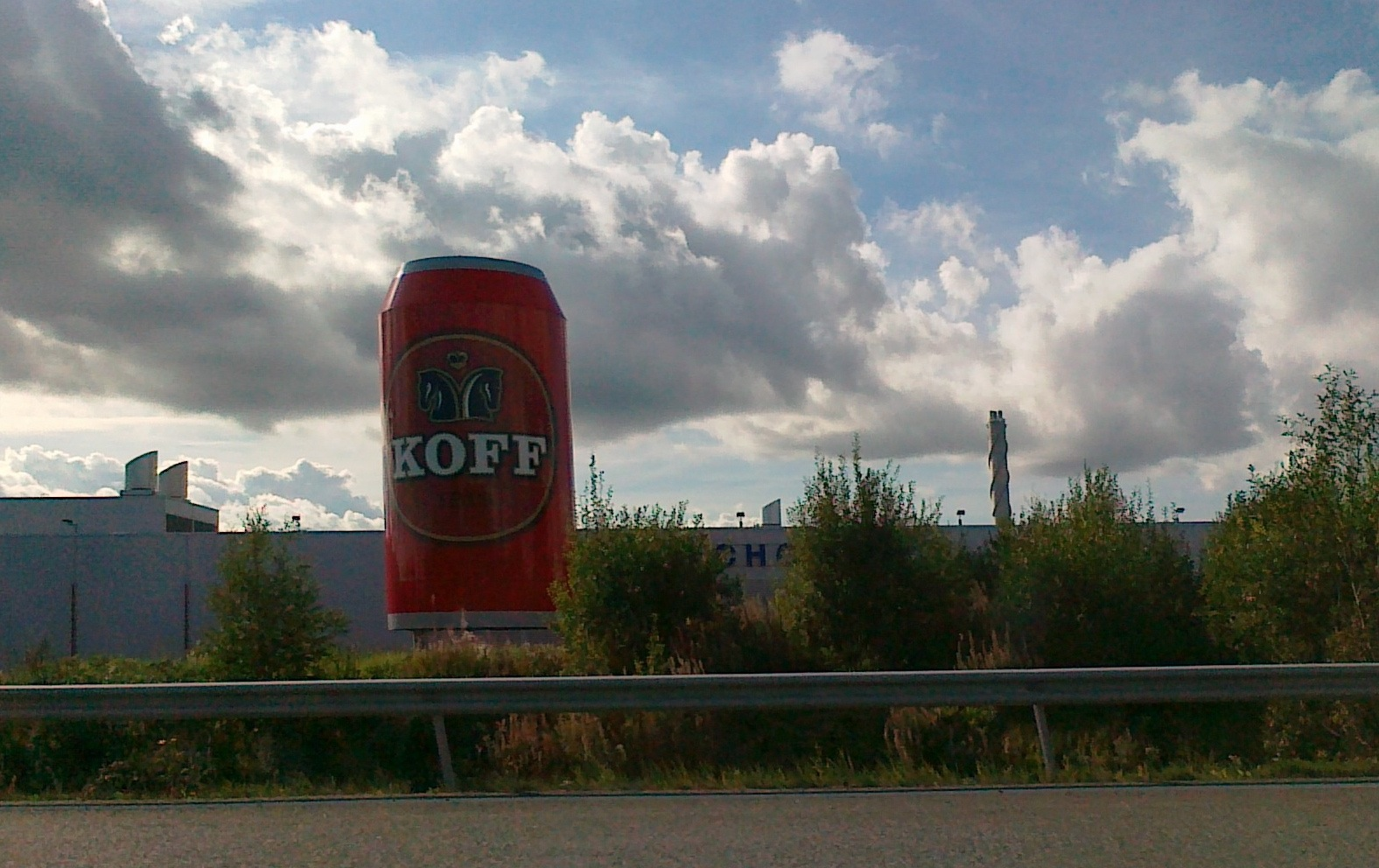
Sinebrychoff Brewery in Kerava

- Auran panimo
- Bock (brewery)
- Bock's Corner Brewery (brewery)
- Brewcats
- C. A. Robsahmin Portteripanimo (sold in 1895)
- CoolHead Brew
- Fat Lizard
- Finlandia Sahti
- Fiskarsin Panimo
- Haapala Brewery
- Hailuodon panimo
- Hartwall (Karjala)
  - Lapin Kulta (owned by Hartwall)
- Hiisi
- Honkavuori
- Hopping Brewsters Beer Company
- Iso-Kallan Panimo
- Kahakka
- Kakola Brewing Company
- Kaleva Brewing Company
- Keudan panimo
- Kiiski
- Koskipanimo
- Kotkan Höyrypanimo
- Kvarken
- Laitilan Wirvoitusjuomatehdas (Kukko)
- Lammin Sahti
- Lapin Voima
- Linden Brewery
- Mad Finn Brewing Co
- Maistila
- Maku Brewing
- Mallaskoski (Kuohu, Häjy, Komia, Makia)
- Mallaskuun panimo
- Malmgårdin Panimo
- Narvan kyläpanimo
- Nokian Panimo (Keisari, Året Runt)
- Olaf
- Olarin Panimo
- Olutpaja
- Olvi (Olvi, Sandels)
- Palvasalmi (bankrupt)
- Panimo Honkavuori
- Pyynikin käsityöläispanimo
- Rekolan Panimo (Amerikan Serkku, Metsän Henki, Munkintie)
- Ruosniemen panimo
- Saimaan Olut (Saimaa), Marsalkka, Rokrammi, Luostari
- Simpeleen Panimo ja Tislaamo Oy
- Sinebrychoff (Karhu, Koff)
  - Porin panimo (owned by Sinebrychoff)
- Sonnisaaren panimo
- Stadin Panimo
- Suomenlinnan Panimo
- Taiwalkosken panimo
- Takatalo & Tompuri Brewery
- Tampere Brewing & Distilling Co
- Teerenpeli
- Tuju
- Ylikylä Olut
- Ålands Bryggeri (Stallhagen)

== Finnish brewery restaurants ==
- Bock's Corner Brewery (Vaasa)
- Haapala Panimoravintola (Sotkamo)
- Hollolan Hirvi (Hollola)
- Panimoravintola Beer Hunter's (Pori)
- Panimoravintola Bruuveri (Helsinki)
- Panimoravintola Huvila (Savonlinna)
- Panimoravintola Koulu (Turku)
- Panimoravintola Plevna (Tampere)
- Perho (Helsinki)
- Ravintola Herman (no longer brewing)
- Teerenpeli Panimo & Tislaamo (Lahti)

== Most important Finnish beers ==
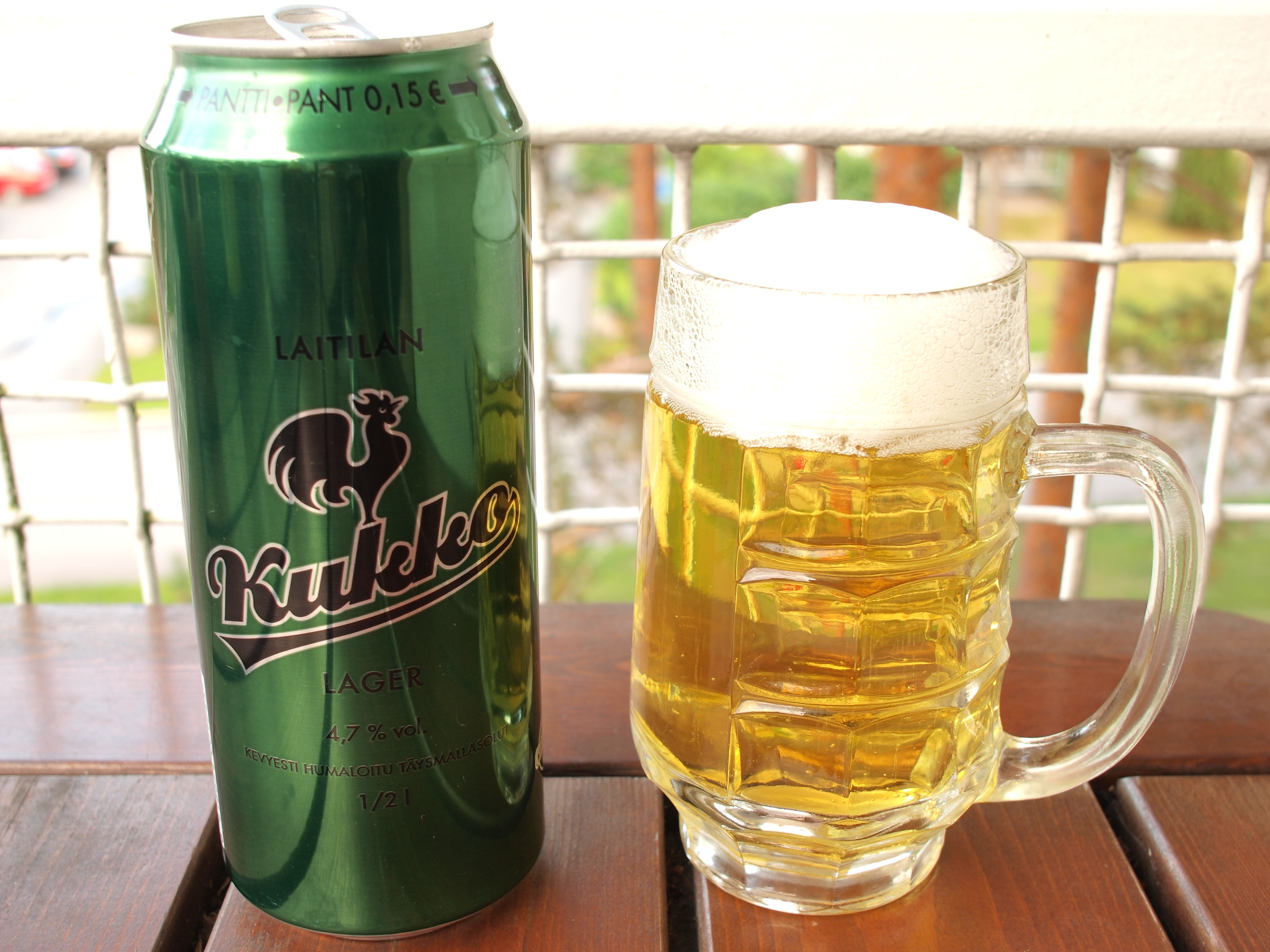
Kukko Lager beer

- Aura
- Karhu
- Karjala
- Koff
- Kukko
- Lapin Kulta
- Olvi
- Sandels

== Annual Finnish beer events ==
- Helsinki Beer Festival (held since 1997)
- Isojano-tapahtuma (held since 1993)
- Kaljakellunta (held since 1997)
- Olutfestivaalit (held since 1990)
- Sahdinvalmistuksen SM-kisat (Finnish sahti brewing championships, held since 1992)
- Suomalaiset sahtipäivät (held since 1995)
- Suuret oluet – pienet panimot (held since 2003)

== See also ==
- Alcohol preferences in Europe
- Beer and breweries by region
- Drinking in public § Finland
- Finnish alcohol culture
- Health in Finland § Alcohol consumption
- Pantsdrunk
- Sahti, traditional Finnish beer
