= Keskiolut =

Beer class in Finland and Sweden

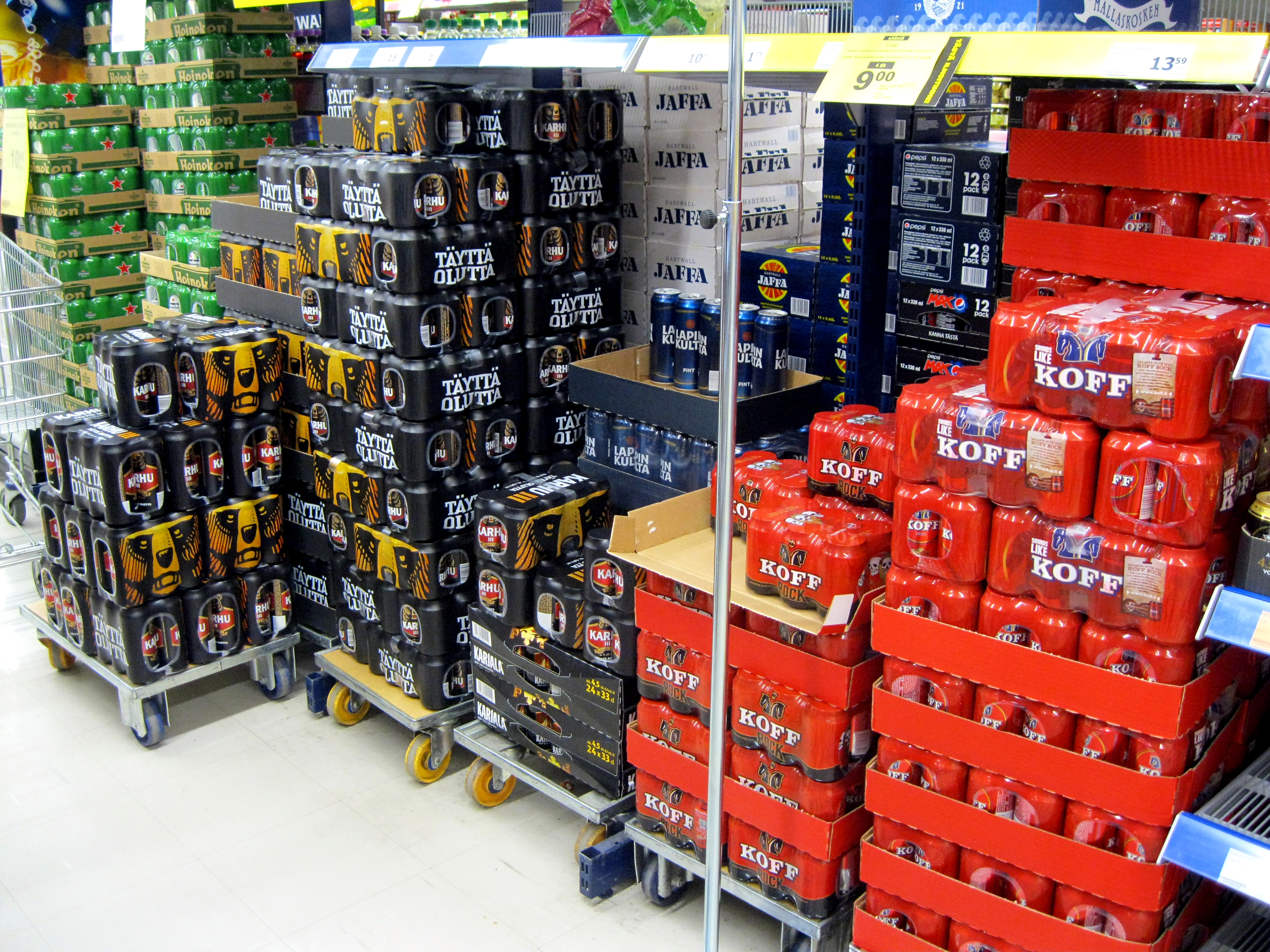
Cases of keskiolut at a Finnish supermarket.

In Finland, keskiolut (mellanöl in Swedish, both meaning "middle beer") is a term for middle-strength beer having a minimum of 2.9% but a maximum of 4.7% alcohol by volume. Keskiolut has been the most popular alcoholic beverage in Finland ever since it was allowed to sell it at grocery stores. Most of the Finnish keskiolut beers have been light lagers, and some of the most common brands include Karhu, Koff, Lapin Kulta, Karjala, Olvi and Sandels.

== History ==
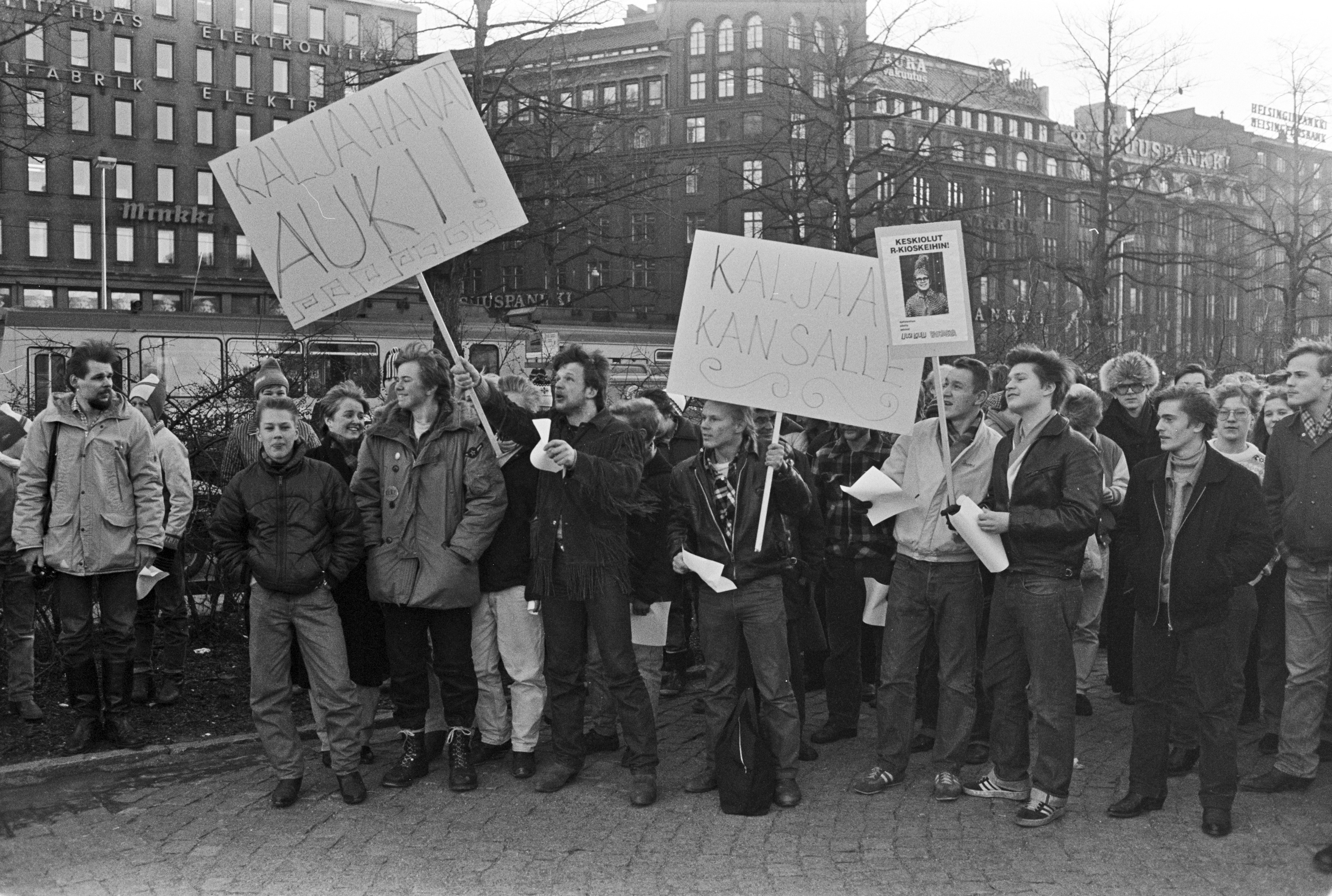
There was a national movement to bring keskiolut to R-kioski convenience stores in December 1980. This image shows a demonstration at the Rautatientori square in central Helsinki.

In early 1969, the so-called "keskiolutlaki" (Finnish for "middle beer law") allowed grocery stores to sell keskiolut. Since then, keskiolut has remained the most popular alcoholic beverage in Finland.

Even after 1969 municipalities in Finland could decide for themselves whether to allow selling keskiolut in stores in their area. In the beginning, there were 90 municipalities not to allow this, but that number has since decreased. The last municipalities to allow selling keskiolut did so in the early 1990s. The last municipality to allow selling keskiolut was Luoto in 1995. It was the last remaining municipality in the entire European Union where selling keskiolut had still not been allowed.

In 1980 there was a campaign to bring keskiolut to R-kioski convenience stores, and in 1981 the humoristic musical group Sleepy Sleepers recorded a song on their album Levyraati called "Kaljaa kioskeihin" ("Bring beer to kiosks"). At the time it was considered impossible to be able to buy keskiolut from convenience stores. Keskiolut later came to convenience stores.

From 1988 to 1994 the strength of beer in tax class III was a minimum of 3.8% but a maximum of 4.7% alcohol by volume. The law also recognised beer in tax class II with an alcohol content between 2.9% and 3.7% but no such beer was produced in Finland.

The alcohol tax law came into force in Finland in 1994. This overrode the tax classes of beer. After this, all beers with an alcohol content between 2.9% and 4.7% by volume have been legally classified as keskiolut.

== Criticism ==
Since the 2000s, there have been suggestions of returning keskiolut to Alko stores only. Alcohol has been the influence for most of the deaths and homicides of working-age people of Finland. It has been shown that daily consumption of keskiolut has often led to alcoholism. According to research, returning keskiolut to Alko stores only would decrease premature deaths caused by alcohol by 350 people annually. There are about 300 deaths in traffic annually.

== In Sweden ==
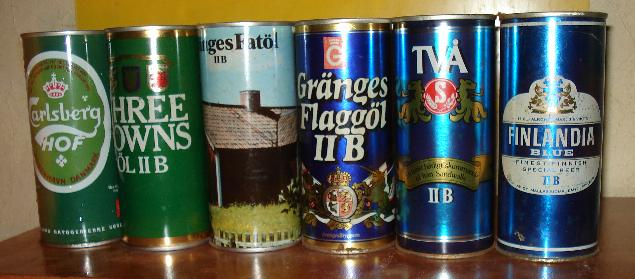
Beer cans of several mellanöl beers. In the late 1970s it was popular to collect all forms of beer cans of the old type of can, some of which were available with various different labels.

Sweden brought beer of type IIB, called mellanöl, to grocery stores before Finland on 1 October 1965, and removed it from there on 1 July 1977 because of adverse effects of alcohol. The alcohol content of mellanöl varied between 3.6% and 4.5% alcohol by weight. Beverages of the same strength were taken into use in restaurants and liquor stores on 1 July 1992 with the tax class III and was called "öl av mellanölstyp" (middle-strength type of beer"). The tax class was removed on 1 January 1998.

=== Beer of class IIB ===
Mellanöl originally referred to a Swedish tax class of beer of 3.6% alcohol by weight. Today alcohol in Sweden is measured by volume, and mellanöl corresponds to around 4.6% of alcohol by volume.

Sales of mellanöl at grocery stores started in Sweden in October 1965. Right from the first day there were over 35 kinds of mellanöl to choose from. Selling mellanöl in grocery stores was still not allowed on Sundays or after 8 PM, the beer was covered with white plastic sheets during that time.

The easy availability of mellanöl was seen as a contributing factor to the long-term effects of alcohol among the Swedish youth and sales of mellanöl at grocery stores ended on 1 July 1977.

=== After July 1977 ===
As mellanöl was only available for sale at Systembolaget after July 1977, mellanöl lost its popularity among the Swedish youth because of its now more difficult availability, losing ground to strong beer.

Swedish breweries have since reintroduced middle-strength beer in the late 1980s, such as 3½ from Spendrups and Three Towns from Pripps. Imported middle-strength beer became available in Sweden in the 1980s.

On 1 July 1992 two new types of beer in the tax class III were introduced in Sweden, of which one corresponds to beer of 3.6% to 4.5% alcohol by volume. These types of beer were called "öl av mellanölstyp" ("beer of the middle beer type") and had a lower tax class.

Since 1 January 1998 all beer in Sweden of over 2.8% alcohol by volume has been taxed by the same amount per litre and "öl av mellanölstyp" as a separate tax class was discontinued. The concept of mellanöl still remains in trademarks and at restaurants. The amount of tax was originally 1.47 Swedish krona, but it has been increased many times and since 1 January 2017 the tax is at 2.02 krona.
