= Koff (beer) =

Finnish beer brand

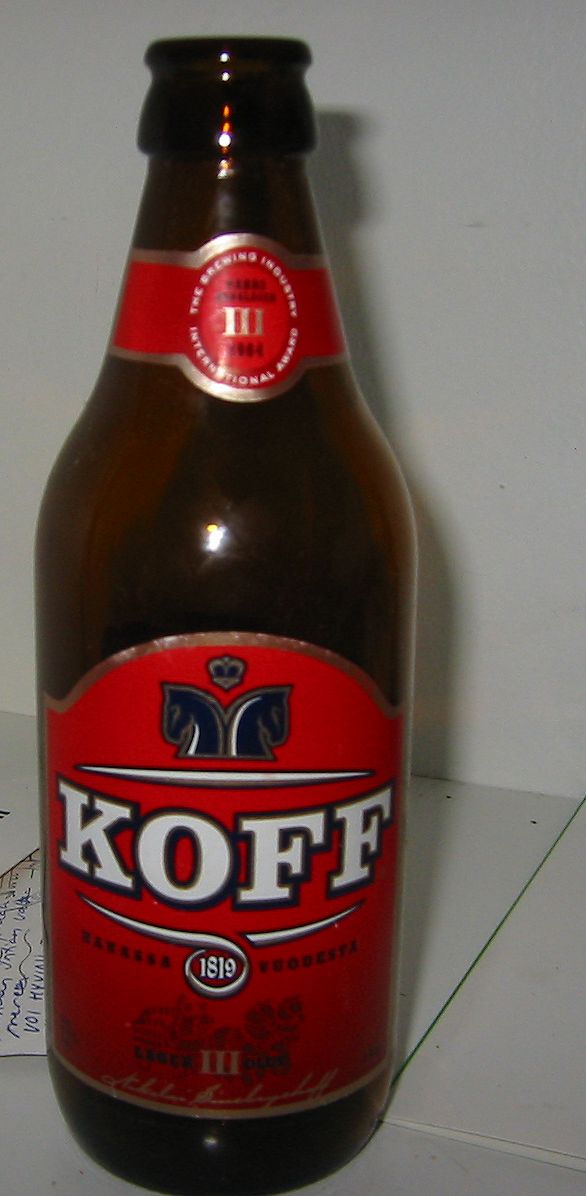
- Bottle of Koff beer (330 ml).
- Type: Beer
- Manufacturer: Sinebrychoff
- Origin: Finland
- Introduced: 1821
- Alcohol by volume: 2.5–7.2%

Koff is the brand name used by Sinebrychoff to market a range of lager type beers. Koff, along with Karhu is one of the most sold beer brands of Sinebrychoff and Finland. Sinebrychoff's beer's biggest market rivals are the products of another large brewery Hartwall, namely Lapin Kulta and Karjala, as well as the beer of Olvi brewery: Olvi.

The Koff brand name is used on the shirt of Finnish SM-liiga Ice Hockey clubs Ilves, HIFK, TPS and Espoo Blues as part of a marketing sponsorship deal.

In 1995, the Spårakoff pub tram started operating in Helsinki just after the 175th anniversary of the brewery, that occurred in 1994.

== Beers ==
- Koff I (2.5%)
- Koff III (4.5%)
- Koff IVA (5.2%)
- Koff IVB (7.5%)
- Koff Extra Brew III (4,5%)
- Koff Extra Brew IV (5,2%)
- Koff Lite III (4,4%)

=== Discontinued beers ===
- Koff Amber (Amarillo-strain hops beer, which was first sold in 2001)
- Koff Draught (a beer sold in red 50cl cans starting from 2004)
- Koff Jouluolut ("Jouluolut" meaning Christmas beer, known later than Sinebrychoff Jouluolut)
- Koff Red Lager Beer (copper red lager, made using caramelized malt)
- Koff Velvet (dark lager, later sold as Velvet)
- Koff Weizze (wheat beer)
- Koff Vienti AIII (export variety)
- Koff Åland Öl (blond lager for the Åland market)
- Koff Wild Indian (4.4%, made using corn syrup)
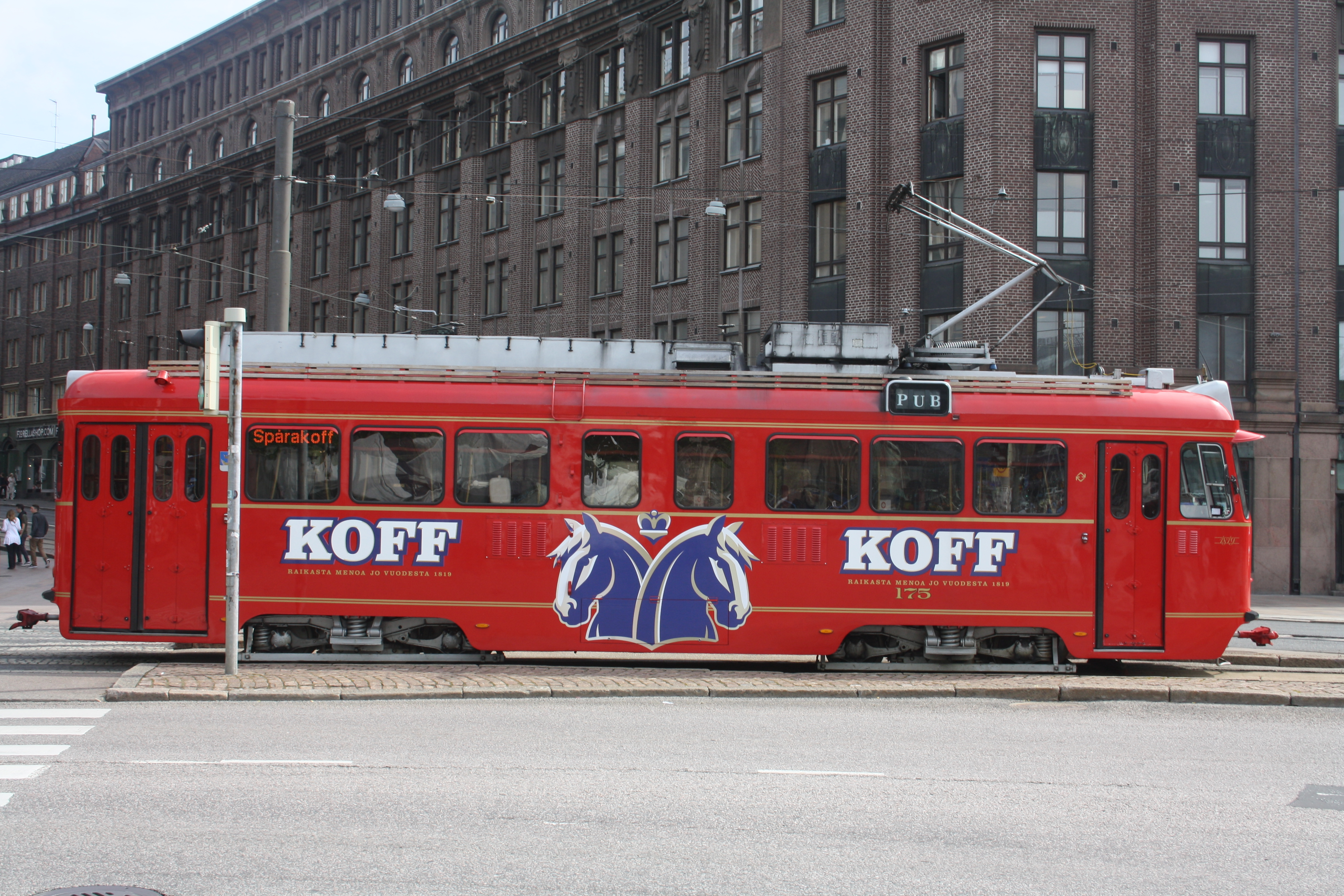
SpåraKoff

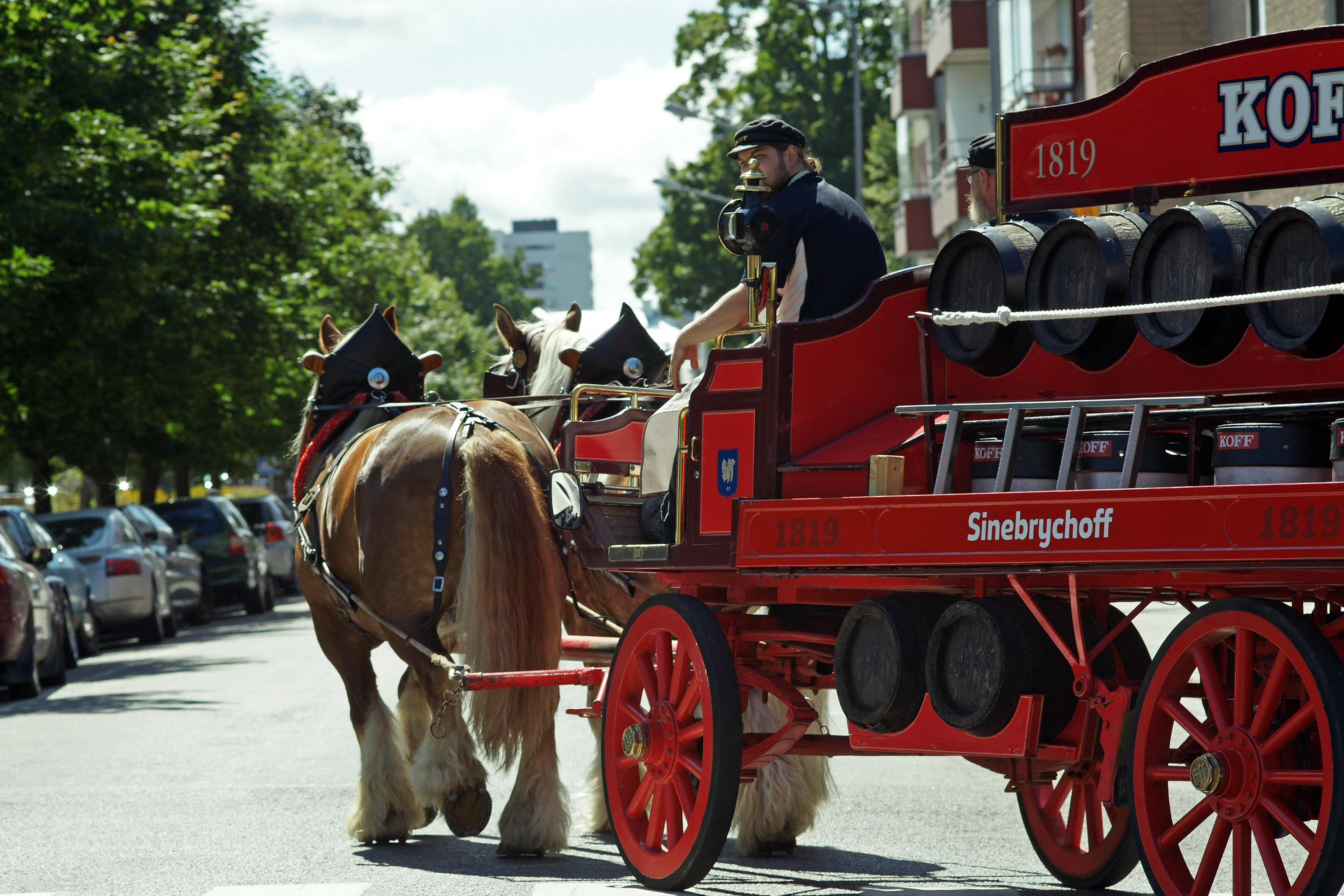
Koff cart

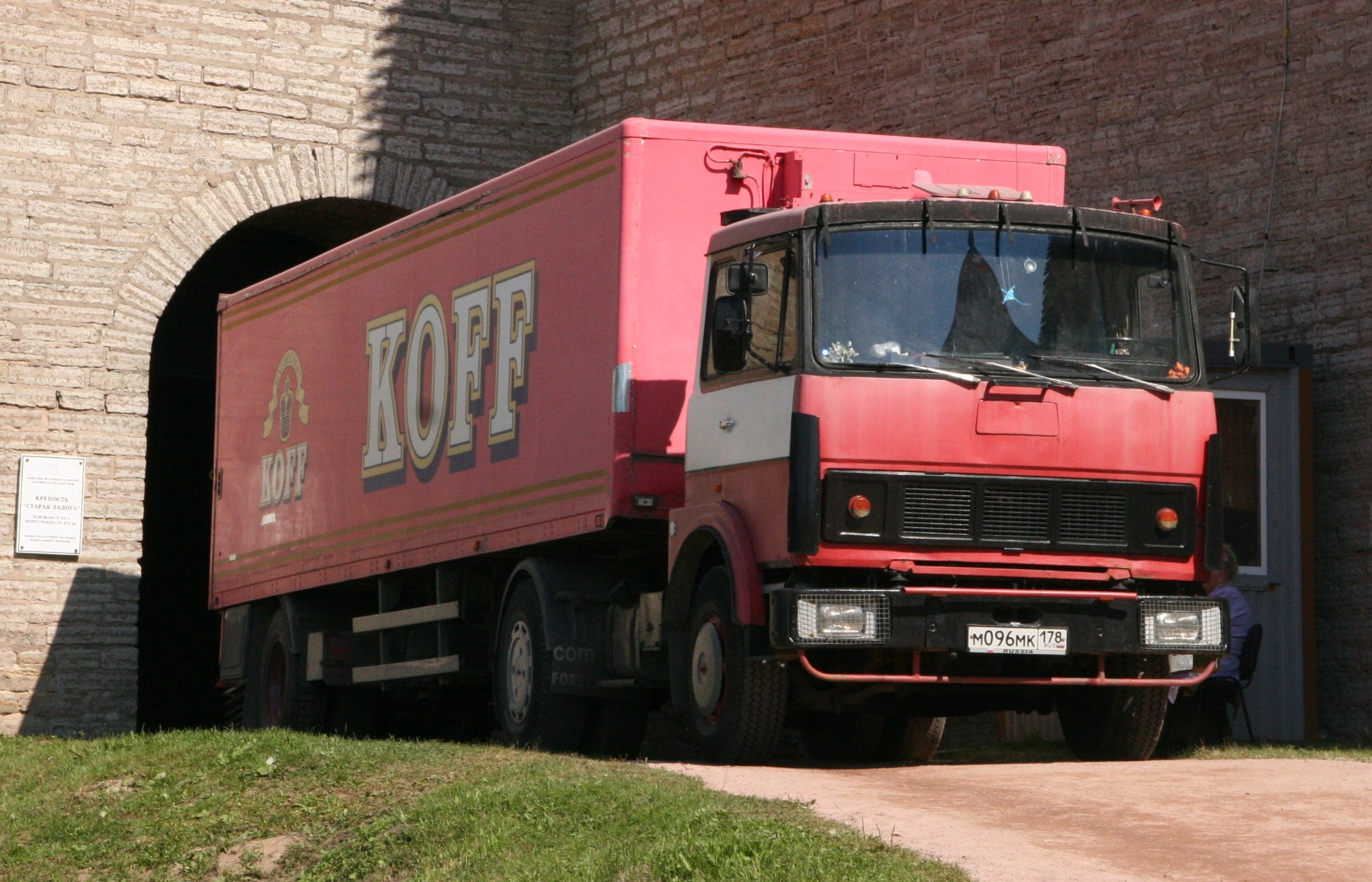
Koff truck

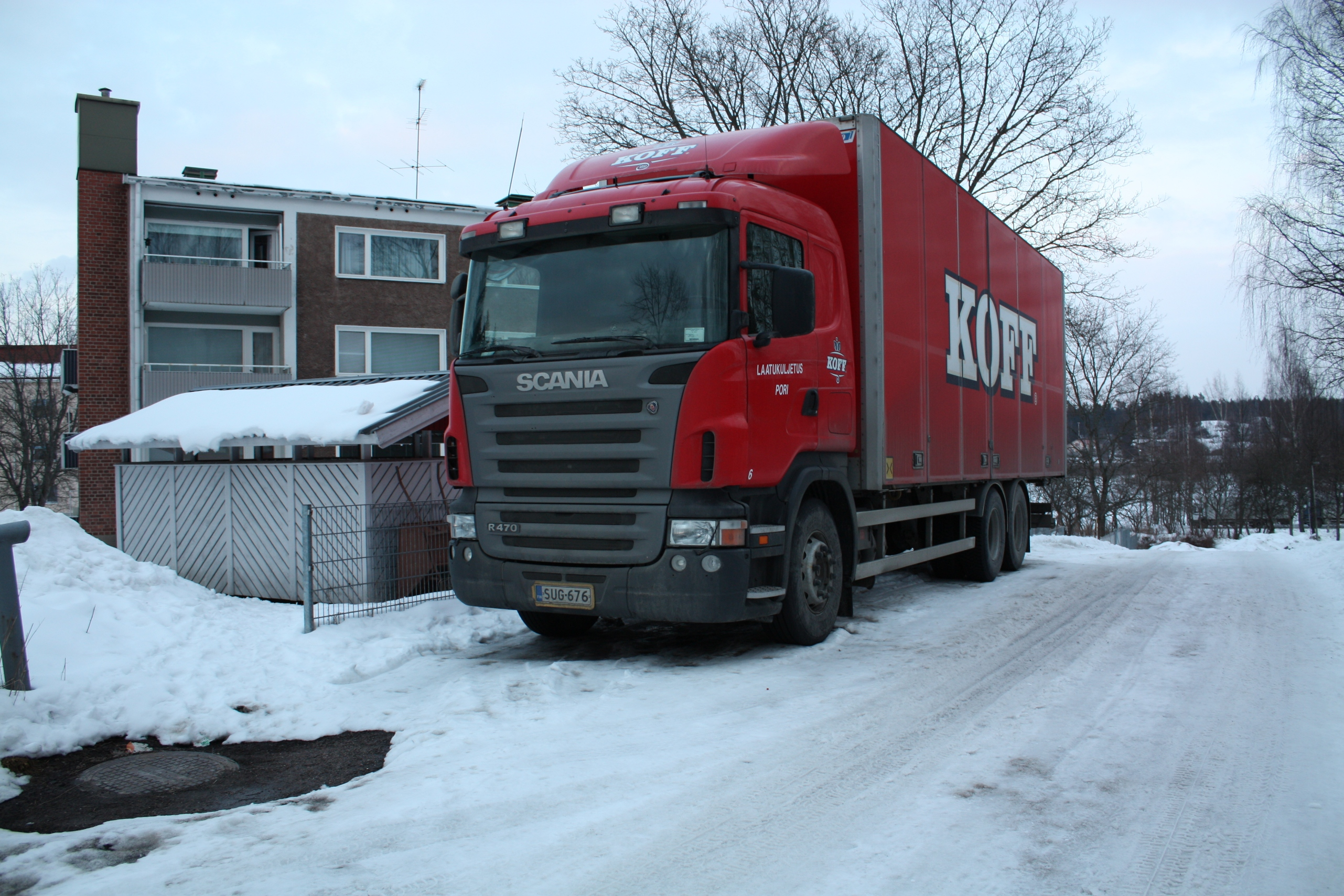
Scania Koff truck

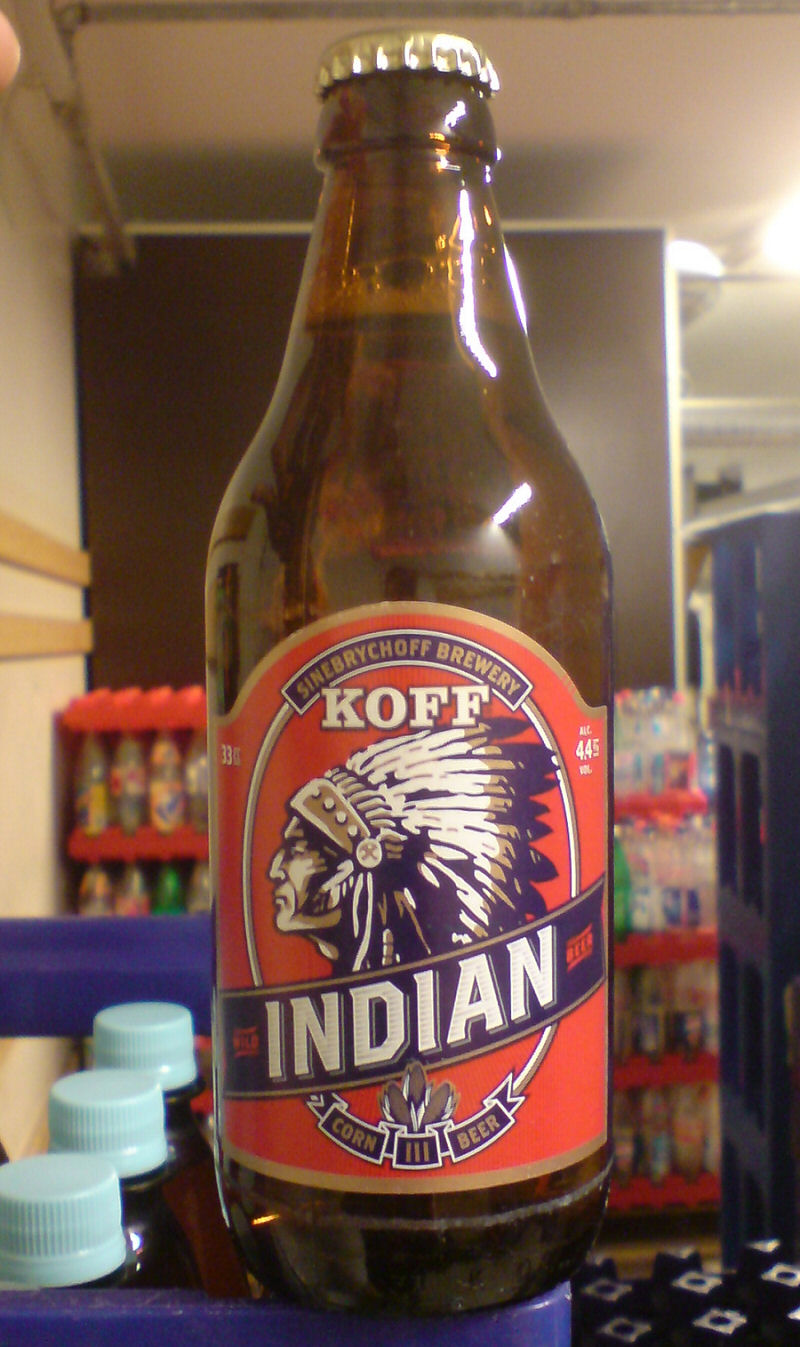
Koff Wild Indian
