= Kukko (disambiguation) =

Kukko (meaning 'rooster' in Finnish) is a Finnish beer brand.

Kukko may also refer to:

- Emil Kukko (1888–1963), Finnish athlete
- Sakari Kukko (born 1953), Finnish saxophonist and flutist

== See also ==
- Kalakukko ("fish cock")
