= Stallhagen =

Finnish brewery

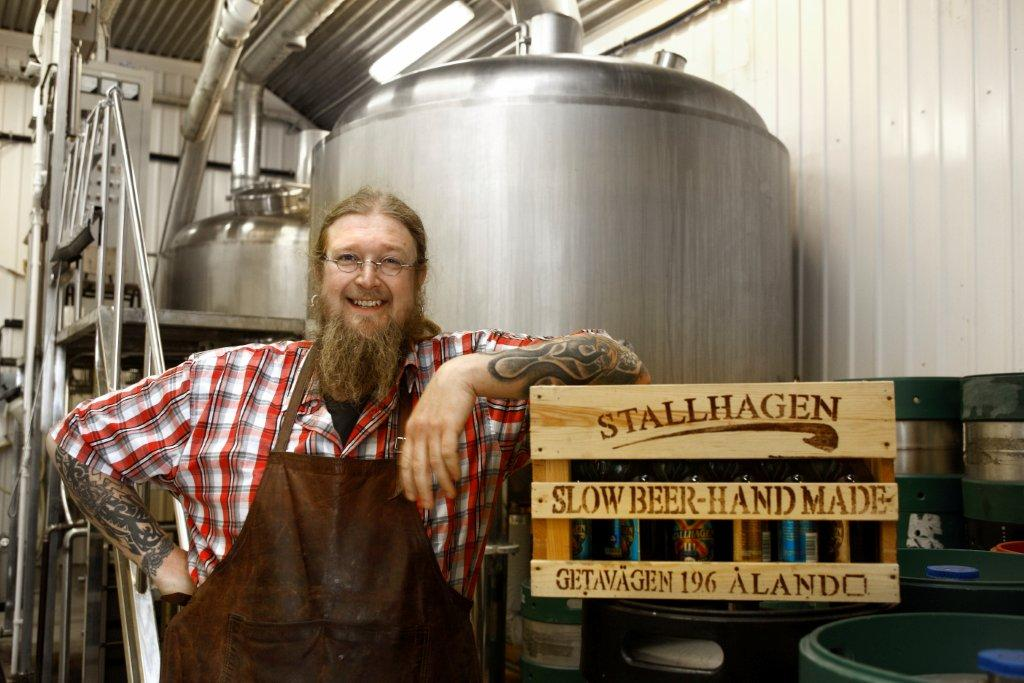
Mats Ekholm, the master brewer of Stallhagen.

Stallhagen Ab is a craft brewery in the municipality of Finström on Åland (Finland). The brewery was founded in 2004 as Ålands Bryggeri Ab and got its current name in 2009. Jan M. Wennström has served as the company CEO since 2010. Stallhagen was the only brewery in Åland before the founding of the Open Water Brewery craft brewery in 2016.

Stallhagen's production premises are located in the village of Grelsby in the municipality of Finström, about 18 kilometres from Mariehamn. In connection to the production premises is also Pub Stallhagen which serves as a pub, a restaurant and an event centre. With about 50 thousand visitors per year the pub is one of the most popular tourist destinations in Åland.

In 2018 Stallhagen's product line included 23 different beers. In July 2014 the brewery introduced a beer called Stallhagen Historic Beer 1842. Its recipe is based on a Belgian beer from 1842 that was found in 2010 in the so-called Föglö wreck.

== Beers ==
The brewery is known for its "hand-made slow beer" approach, using traditional methods and longer maturation times to prioritize flavour and craftsmanship over rapid production. Many core beers, such as Baltic Porter, Bock, and IPA Original, are made with classic brewing ingredients: malt, hops, water, and yeast, while seasonal and experimental brews incorporate diverse local elements, including honey, wild berries, mushrooms, and juniper.

Stallhagen is also known for its historic and event-oriented beers. The brewery garnered international attention with the scientifically guided reconstruction of Stallhagen Historic Beer 1843, based on 1840s bottles recovered from a shipwreck in Åland waters. This project, realized through collaborations with research institutes in Finland and Belgium, involved detailed chemical analysis of the original beer's residues, including yeast and lactic acid bacteria, and experiments with open fermentation to recreate the unique flavour profile of a nineteenth-century mixed-culture ale.
