= Beer classification in Sweden and Finland =

The beer classification in Sweden and Finland sorts beers into classes based on their alcohol content. The classes vary slightly between the two countries.

== Finland ==
While previously enforced by law, the beer class legislation was repealed in 1995 with the accession of Finland into the European Union and the consequent harmonization of tax law, and is now merely kept as a convention. However, drinks containing under 2.8% alcohol (Class I) are still favorably taxed, and the retail sale of any drinks containing more than 5.5% alcohol were still limited to state retailer Alko. In June 2024 this alcohol limit was raised to 8.0%.

Even though the slang word pilsneri for low-alcohol beer comes from the pilsner style of beer, in practice the slang word is used for any style of low-alcohol beer, not just pilsners.

| | Common name | Alcohol content (abv) | Available in pubs | Available in supermarkets | Notes |
|---|---|---|---|---|---|
| Class I | ykkösolut, pilsneri | 0.0–2.8% | Yes | Yes | No alcohol retail license necessary. |
| Class II | - | 2.8–3.7% | Yes | Yes | Never used in practice. |
| Class III | keskiolut, keskari | 3.7–4.7% | Yes | Yes | The most popular beer type. |
| Class IVA | vahva olut | 4.8–5.2% | Yes | Yes (from 1 January 2018) | Prohibitively taxed before 1995 and largely limited to export sales. |
| Class IVB | vahva olut | 5.2–8.0% | Yes | Yes (from June 2024) and microbreweries with a capacity under 500,000 liter per year can sell up to 12% from factory outlet (from 1 March 2018). | Prohibitively taxed before 1995. |

== Sweden ==
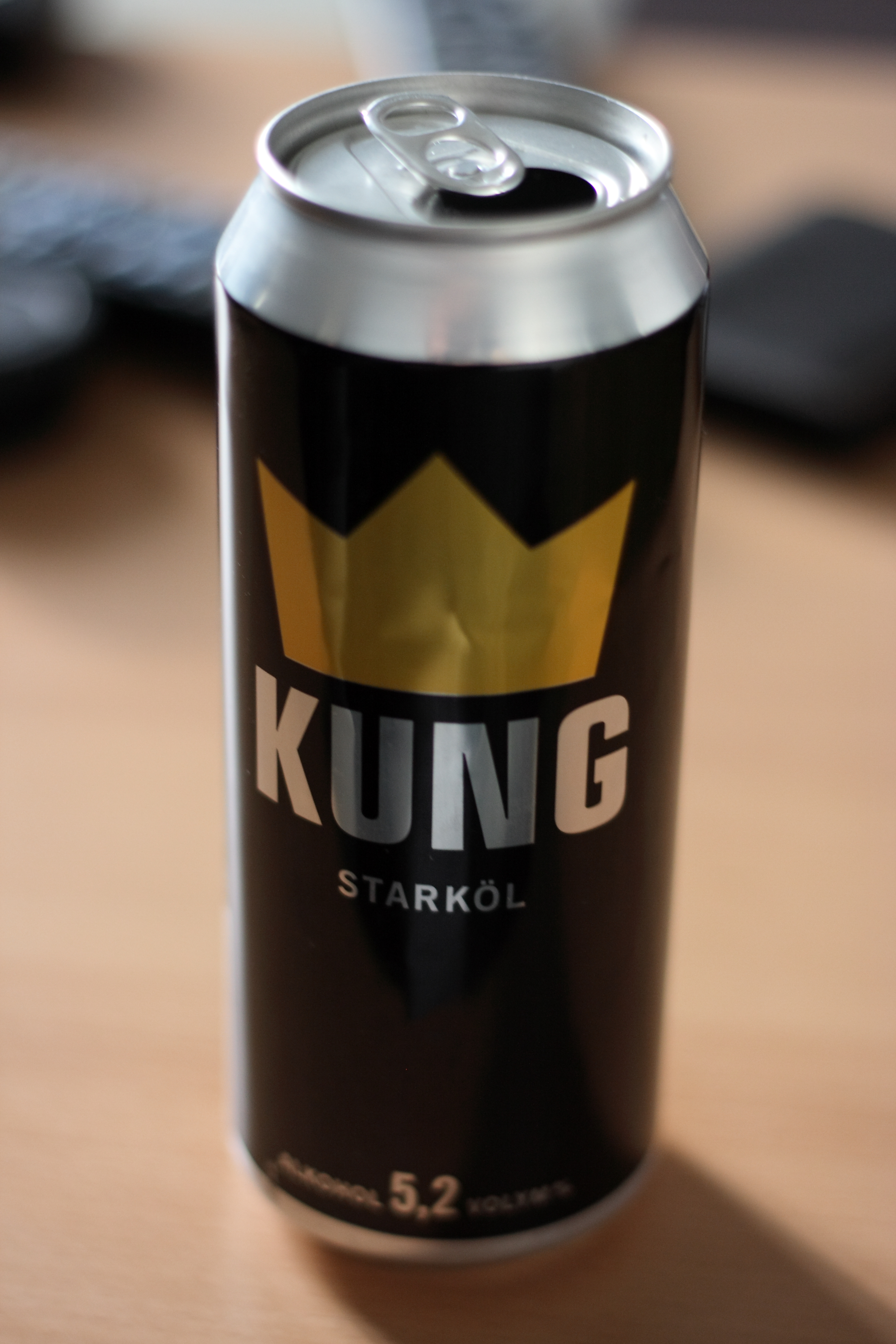
A can of "Kung" (Swedish for "king") brand starköl with an alcohol content of 5.2% per volume. This kind of beer is not available at Swedish supermarkets.

Only classes I and II can be purchased in supermarkets, while class III can only be purchased in restaurants licensed to do so, and the state shops Systembolaget.

Class II beer is loosely divided into two sub-groups, light "Folköl" ("people's beer") with a maximum ABV of 2.8% and normal "Folköl", with a maximum ABV of 3.5%. An alcohol content of 2.8% and below is not subject to specific, higher, alcohol taxes, but only to VAT (12%) as any other food or non-alcoholic drink.

Class III beer is also, unofficially, divided into two sub-groups, "Mellanöl" ("in-between beer"), with ABV between 3.6% and 4.5%, and normal "strong beer" with ABV above 4.5%. There is no real maximum amount of how much alcohol Class III beer may contain, and amounts of 10%+ are common. Mellanöl used to be available in supermarkets between October 1, 1965 and July 1, 1977, but was removed from the supermarkets due to heavy consumption by Swedish teenagers. Today "Mellanöl" does not exist as a class of its own, but "Mellanöl style beer" is available at Systembolaget. Before 1997, alcohol by weight was used, and then the limit for shops was 2.8%, same as 3.5% alcohol by volume, which was a source of confusion.

| | Alcohol content (ABV) | Available in restaurants | Available in supermarkets | Taxed |
|---|---|---|---|---|
| Class I (Lättöl) | 0.0–2.25% | Yes | Yes | No |
| Class II (Lätt Folköl) | 2.8% | Yes | Yes | No |
| Class II (Folköl) | 3.5% | Yes | Yes | Yes |
| Class III (Mellanöl) | 3.6–4.5% | Yes | No | Yes |
| Class III (Starköl) | 4.6% + | Yes | No | Yes |

== See also ==
- Low-alcohol beer
