= Teerenpeli =

Finnish family company

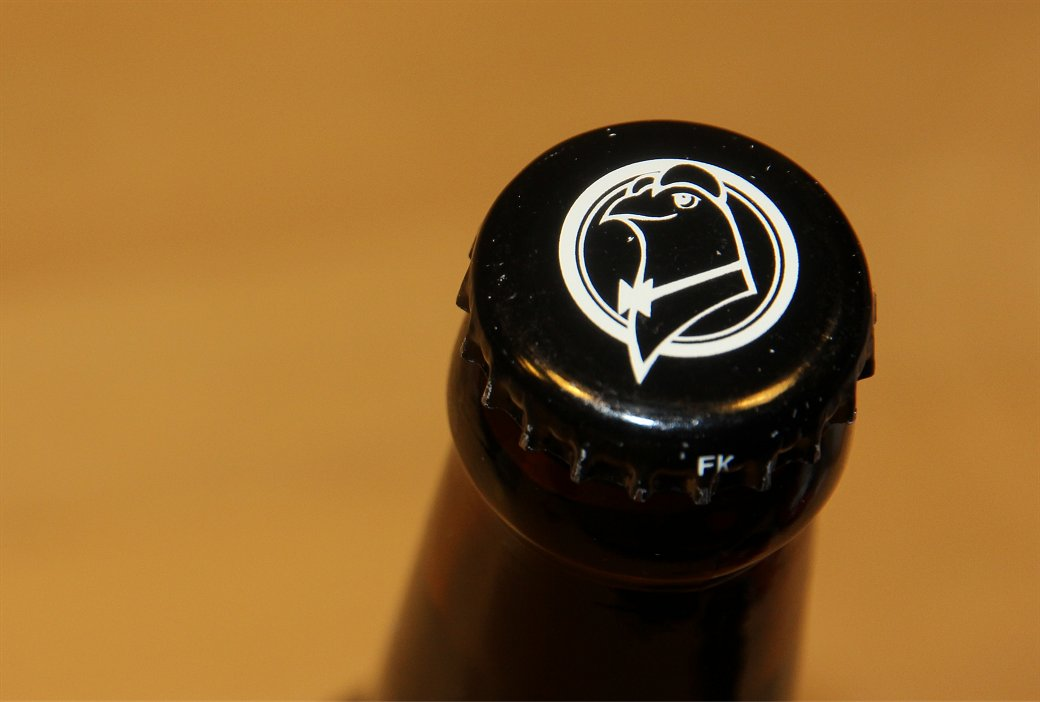
The Teerenpeli logo on a beer bottle cap. Teerenpeli is a Finnish brewery founded in Lahti in 1995, later greatly expanded and awarded for its beers.

Teerenpeli is a Finnish family company founded in 1994 operating in the restaurant, brewery and distillery business as well as franchising.

== Name ==
The name "Teerenpeli" means the courtship of the black grouse in Finnish, and the term is also used for flirting between people. The company logo features a male black grouse.

== History ==
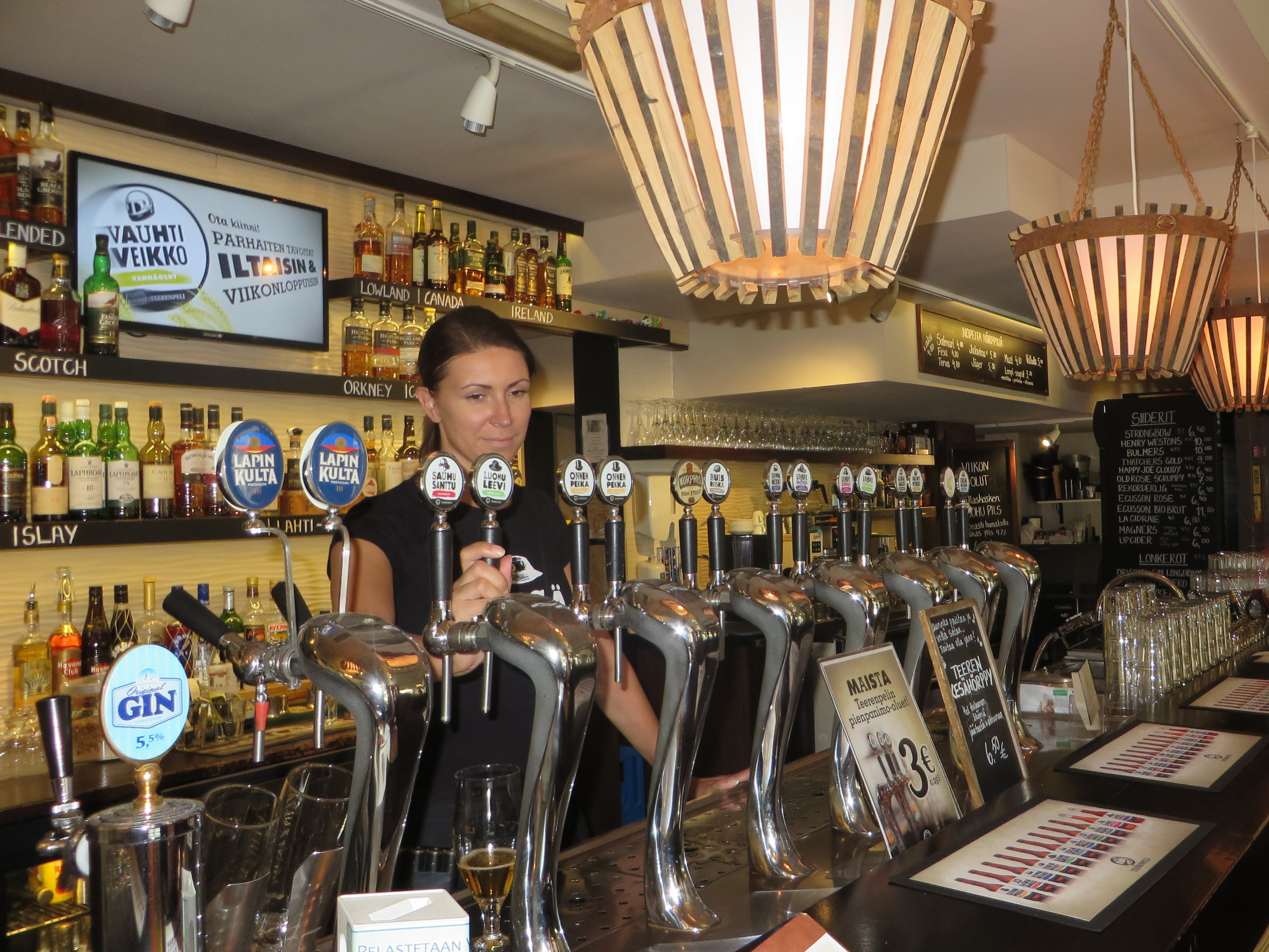
The Teerenpeli restaurant in Lahti.

The Teerenpeli beer restaurant was opened in 1994 on Vapaudenkatu street in Lahti. The first small-scale brewery was opened near the restaurant in the following year. The first brewery only had a brewing kettle of 60 litres. In 1997 this was expanded to 250 litres and the brewery started also brewing cider. This brewing equipment is still in use and is used to brew special beers in the Teerenpeli restaurant in Helsinki. In 2002 the brewery moved to the cellar of restaurant Taivaanranta in Lahti. The company also started distilling malt whisky in the same year. In 2009 Teerenpeli built its own brewery building in the Lotila industrial area in Lahti and acquired its own bottling equipment. The former brewery premises were fully taken into use to distil whisky.

Teerenpeli's first beer was Puolukka Lysti, a dark lager flavoured with lingonberries. In its first year, the brewery produced 2000 litres of beer, while nowadays the Teerenpeli brewery produces almost half a million litres of beer and cider per year. The distillery also produces about 100 thousand litres of whisky per year to mature in barrels.

The Teerenpeli beer restaurants are located in Lahti, Helsinki, Tampere, Turku, Lappeenranta, Jyväskylä and Oulu.

== Awards ==
The brewery's Laiskajaakko beer was awarded first prize in the Suomen Paras Olut 2011 contest in the series "dark lager up to 4.7%, packaged beers". The brewery also won two second prizes in different series.
