= Laitilan Wirvoitusjuomatehdas =

Finnish brewery

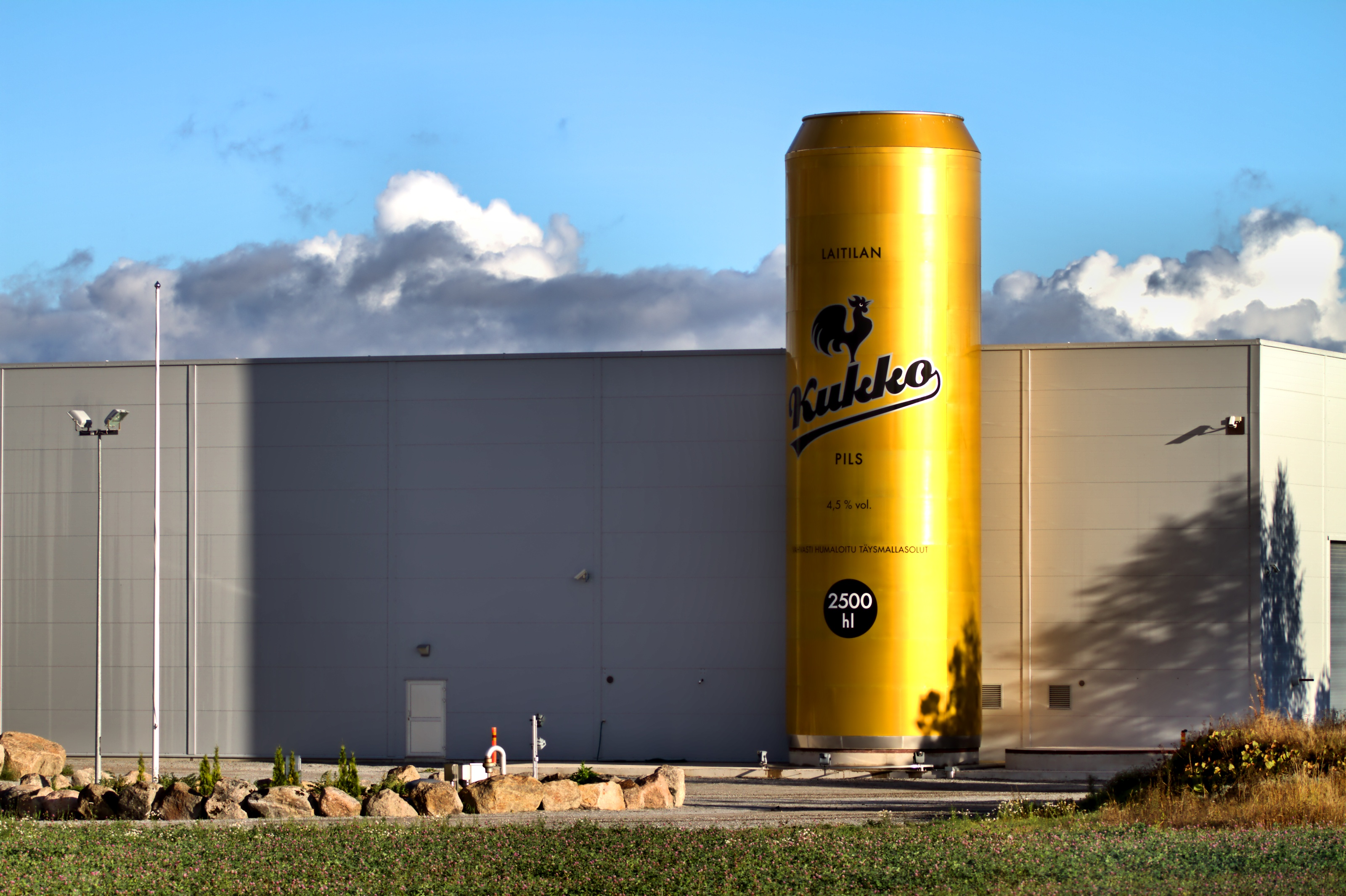
Laitilan Wirvoitusjuomatehdas brewery in 2013.

Laitilan Wirvoitusjuomatehdas is a Finnish brewery and a soft drinks company based in Laitila. It was founded in 1995 and now the company owns several brands, such as: Kukko beers, OIVA ciders, Kievari beers and Wanhanajan Limonaadi lemonades. The company also produces, for example, the Euro Shopper ciders sold in Finland and the Hurriganes beer, which is named after a famous Finnish rock group. Since 2001, all of the products of Laitilan Wirvoitusjuomatehdas are manufactured using wind power. Furthermore, some of the products, for example the Kukko beers (except for the porter and wheat beer), are also gluten free and as such suitable for Coeliac disease sufferers.

The company was previously known as Fisutta Oy and it was renamed in November 2006 as Laitilan Wirvoitusjuomatehdas Oy.

The company uses the archaic spelling "wirvoitus" instead of the contemporary spelling "virvoitus" (Finnish for "refreshment") on purpose to evoke an old-fashioned feel.

== Old time style soft drinks ==
- Hawaiji (Pineapple lemonade)
- Lemona (lemonade)
- Messina (blood orange lemonade)
- Rio Cola (cola)
- Sitruuna-Sooda (lemonade)
- Le Pom (fruit lemonade)

== Sugar free soft drinks ==
- Samba (Watermelon-passionfruit)
- Lambada (Red candy)

== Mister Hakkarainen lemonades ==
The products are based on Finnish children's book character Herra Hakkarainen by Mauri Kunnas

- Mister Hakkarainen raspberry lemonade (Raspberry flavor)
- Mister Hakkarainen pear lemonade (Pear flavor)

== Laitila sparkling water cans ==
- Unflavored sparkling water

Juice flavored sparkling waters

- Pomegranate-raspberry flavored sparkling water
- Peach-Pineapple flavored sparkling water
- Blueberry-grapefruit flavored sparkling water

== Discontinued products ==
- La Rita (orange lemonade)
- Rio Rita (soft drink) (grapefruit lemonade)

== Alcoholic beverages ==
- Kukko (beer brand)
- OIVA (cider brand)
- Kievari (beer brand)
- Hurriganes (beer brand)
