= Kukko =

Finnish beer brand

Kukko Tumma III

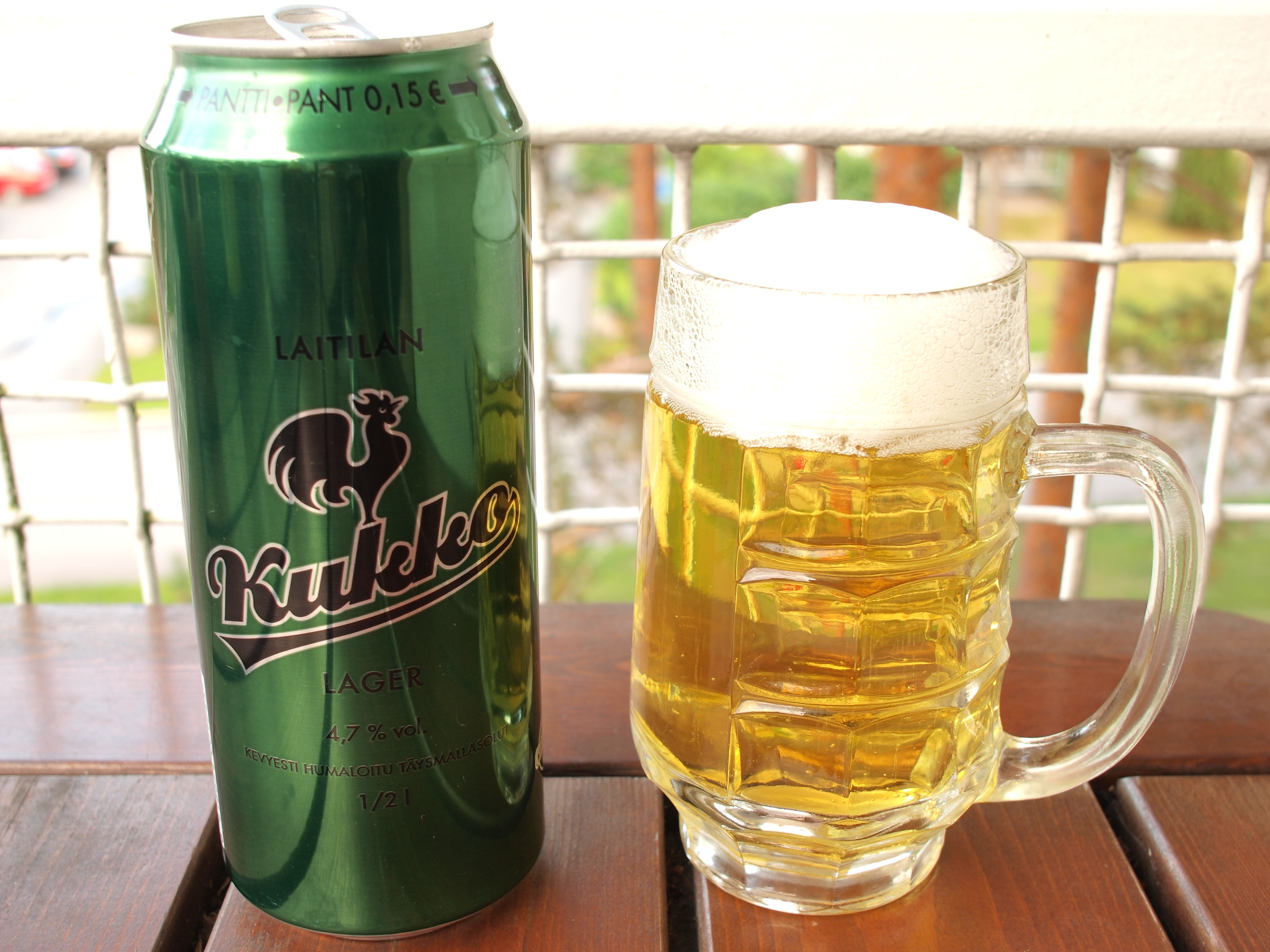
Kukko Lager poured into a glass

Kukko is a Finnish beer brand which has been manufactured and owned by Laitilan Wirvoitusjuomatehdas Oy since 2001. Most of the beers are sold both in cans as well as bottles. These beers are set apart from the competition by their environmental aspect: they are all manufactured using wind power. Most of the Kukko beers are also gluten free and as such suitable for Coeliac disease sufferers.

Kukko means rooster in Finnish and a rooster is also the factory emblem. The rooster comes from the coat of arms of Laitila.

In 2003 at Tampere, Kukko Pils was awarded as the best domestic beer as well as the best bottom-fermented beer.

== Beers ==
- Kukko Pils III (4,5%, Pilsener)
- Kukko Vahva Pils (5,5%, Pilsener)
- Kukko Tumma III (4,5%, dark)
- Kukko Lager III (4,7%, Lager)
- Kukko Vaalea III Olut (4.7%, blond)
- Kukko Portteri (6,5%, Porter)
- Kukko Tuima (8,5%, Doppelbock)
