= Lapin Kulta =

Finnish beer brand

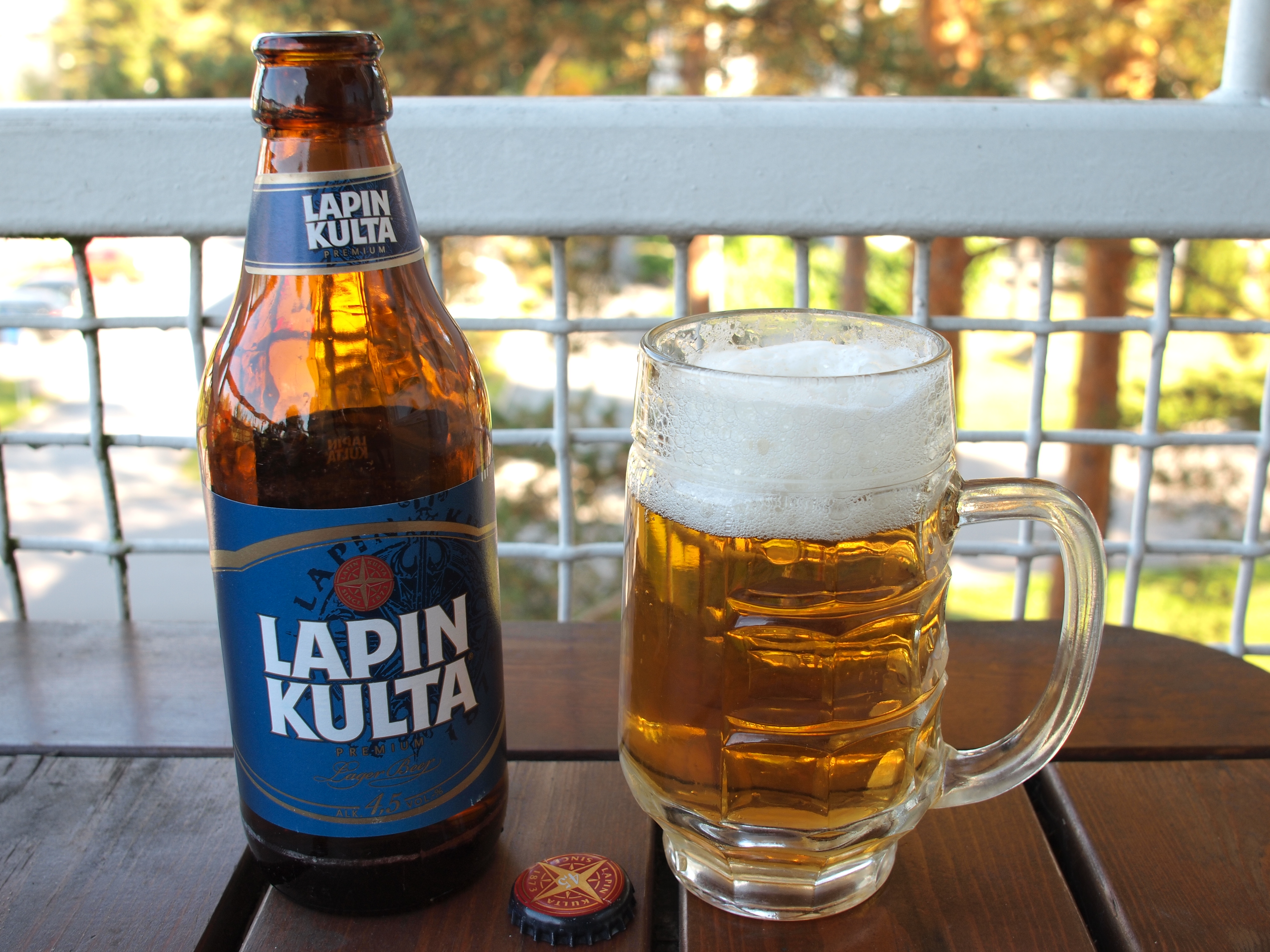
- Lapin Kulta III beer
- Manufacturer: Hartwall
- Country of origin: Finland
- Region of origin: Tornio, Lappi
- Introduced: 1963
- Alcohol by volume: 5.2% IVA; 4.5% III; 2.7% I
- Style: Lager
- IBU scale: 21 (IVA); 18.5 (III); 14 (I)
- Website: www.lapinkulta.fi

Lapin Kulta (in English, Lapland Gold) is a Finnish beer brand. Lapin Kulta was also the name of the brewery in the Lapland town of Tornio, where the beer was originally brewed. The brewery was founded in 1873 under the name Torneå Bryggeri Aktiebolag (i.e., Tornio Brewery Limited Company). The brand is now owned by Hartwall, which is in turn owned by Royal Unibrew.

The brand name Lapin Kulta is used for a variety of lagers of varying strengths. In 2009 the Lapland brewery was closed and since then Lapin Kulta has been brewed in the southern Finnish town of Lahti.

== History ==
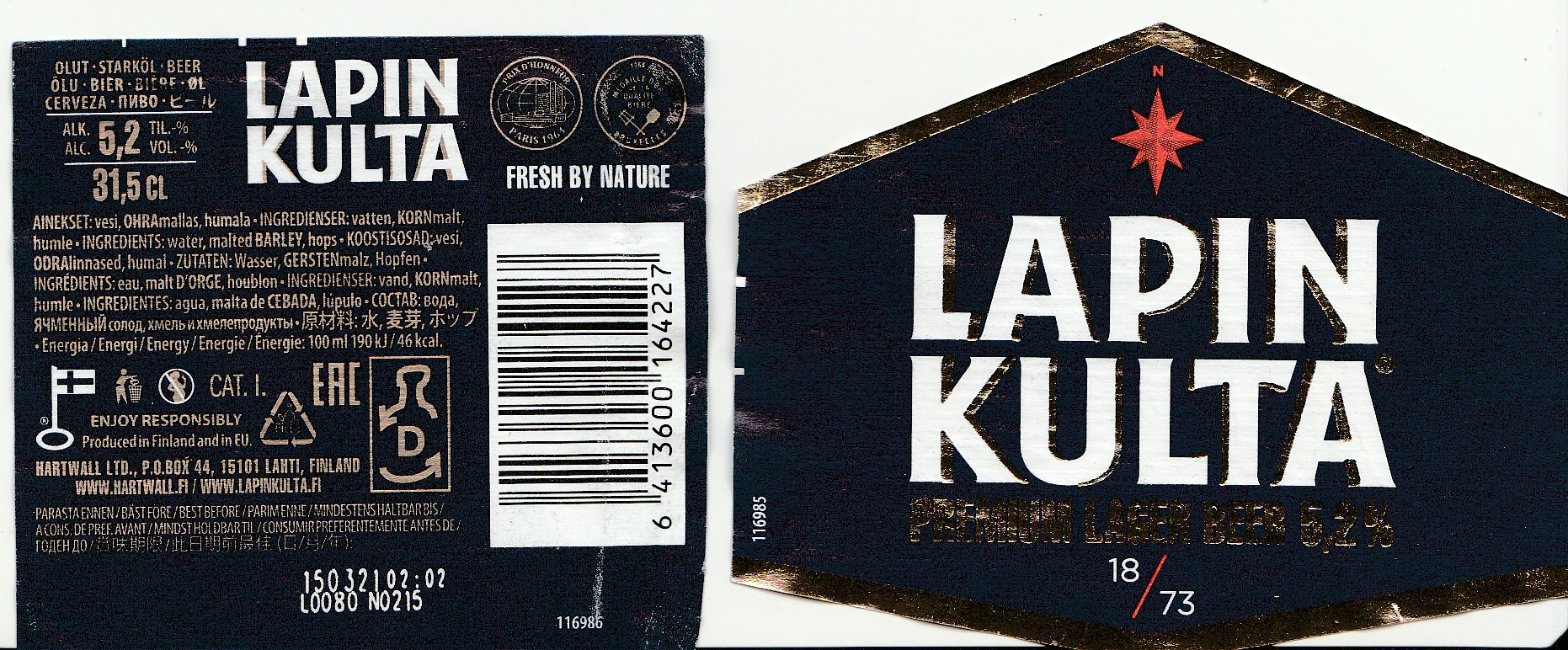
Lapin Kulta Premium Lager Beer label

The brewery was founded in 1873, but the name Lapin Kulta was not adopted until 1963. The brewery had to acquire a gold mining company with an identical name in order to rightfully use the name. The company's articles of association still state the line of business to be "prospecting for gold and the manufacture and sales of beer".

Lapin Kulta's focus is on high-quality ingredients (malt barley, clear water, and the company's own yeast strain). This, coupled with successful marketing, made it the most popular beer brand in Finland for a long period. In the 21st C., the competitors Karhu and Olvi have overtaken it, leaving Lapin Kulta in 4th place.

After a merger with the Hartwall beverage company in 1980, the brand name entered the export market and eventually became available in most European countries.

In October 2009 Hartwall announced the closure of the Lapin Kulta brewery in Tornio, and moved production to its Lahti brewery.

=== Gallery ===
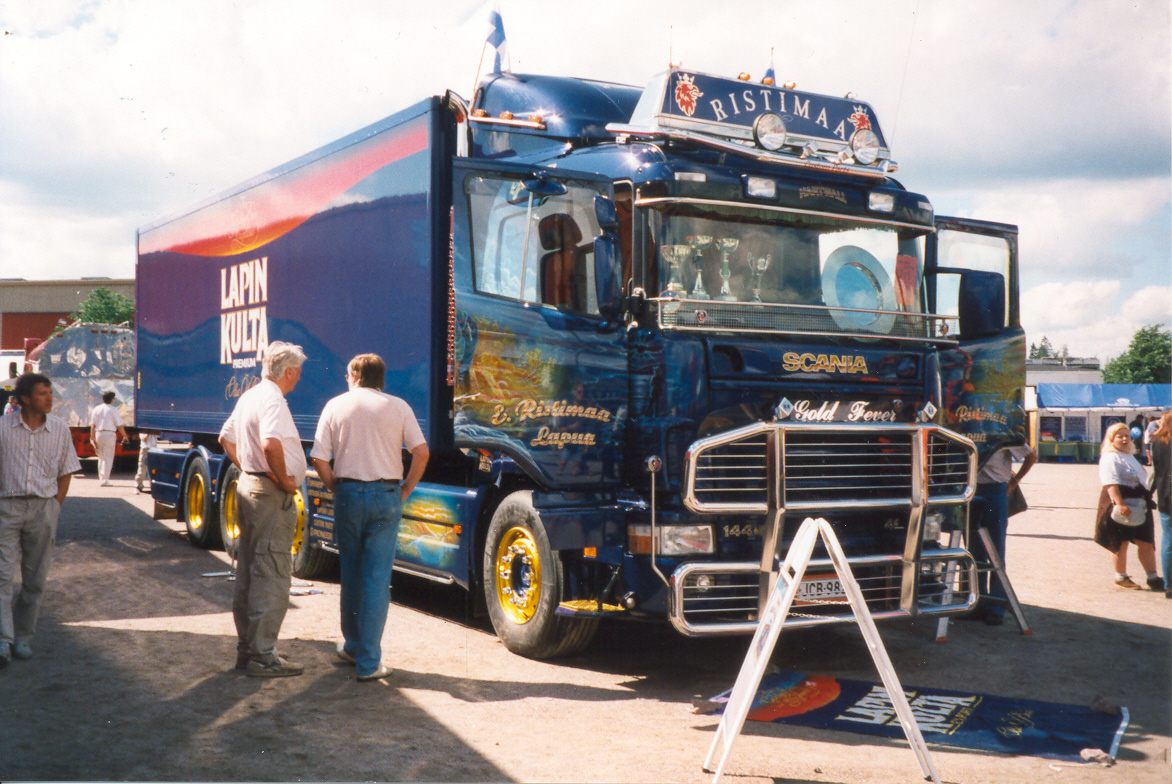

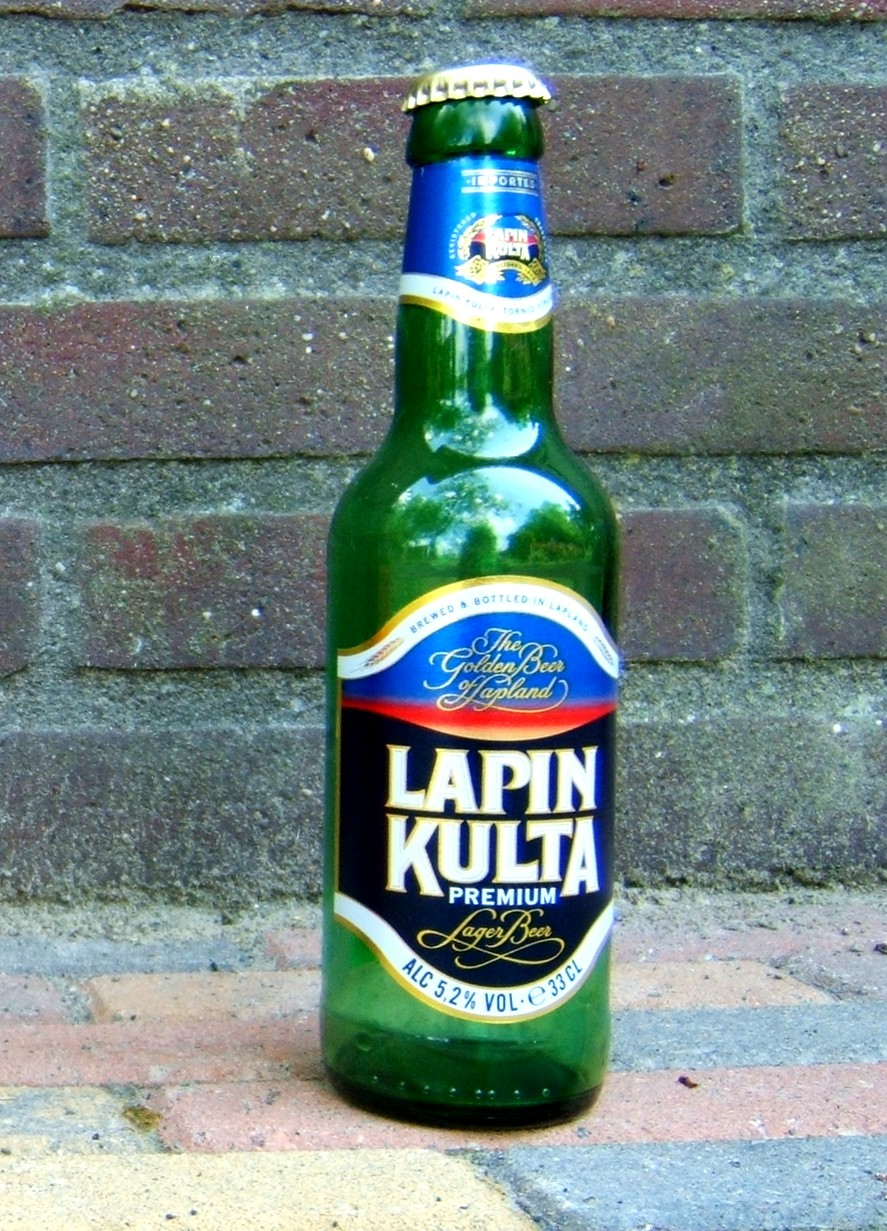

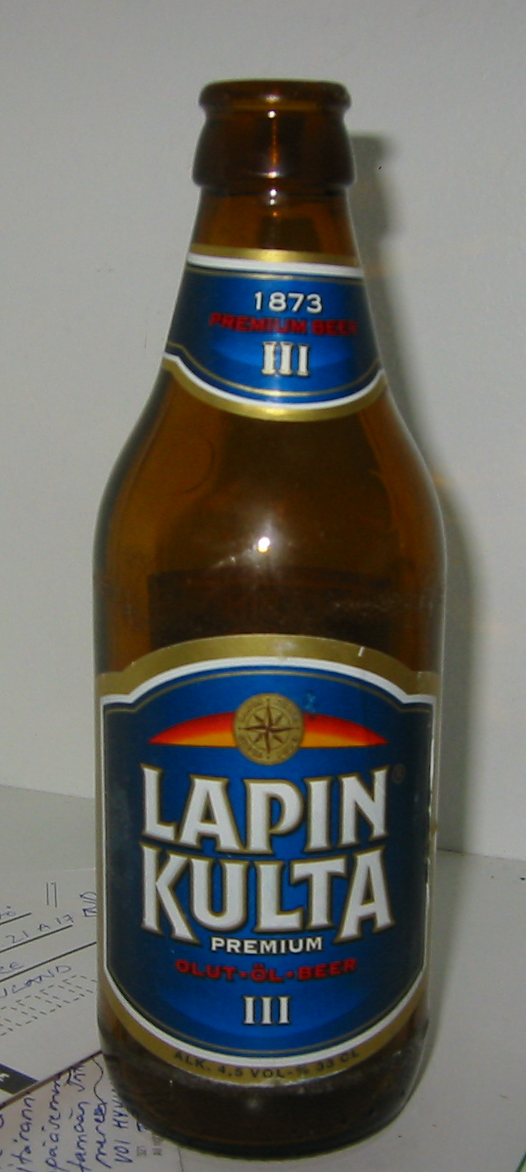

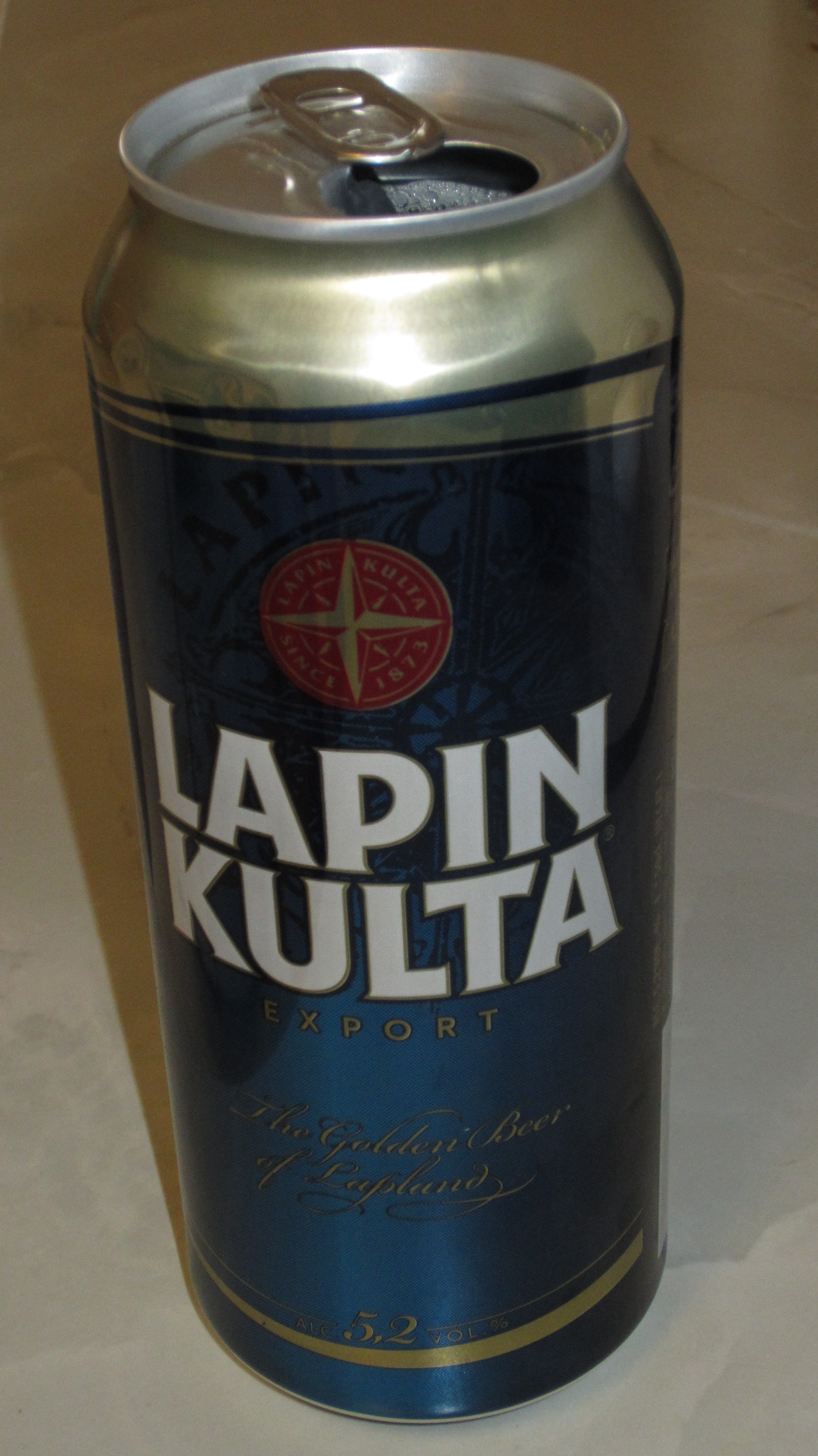

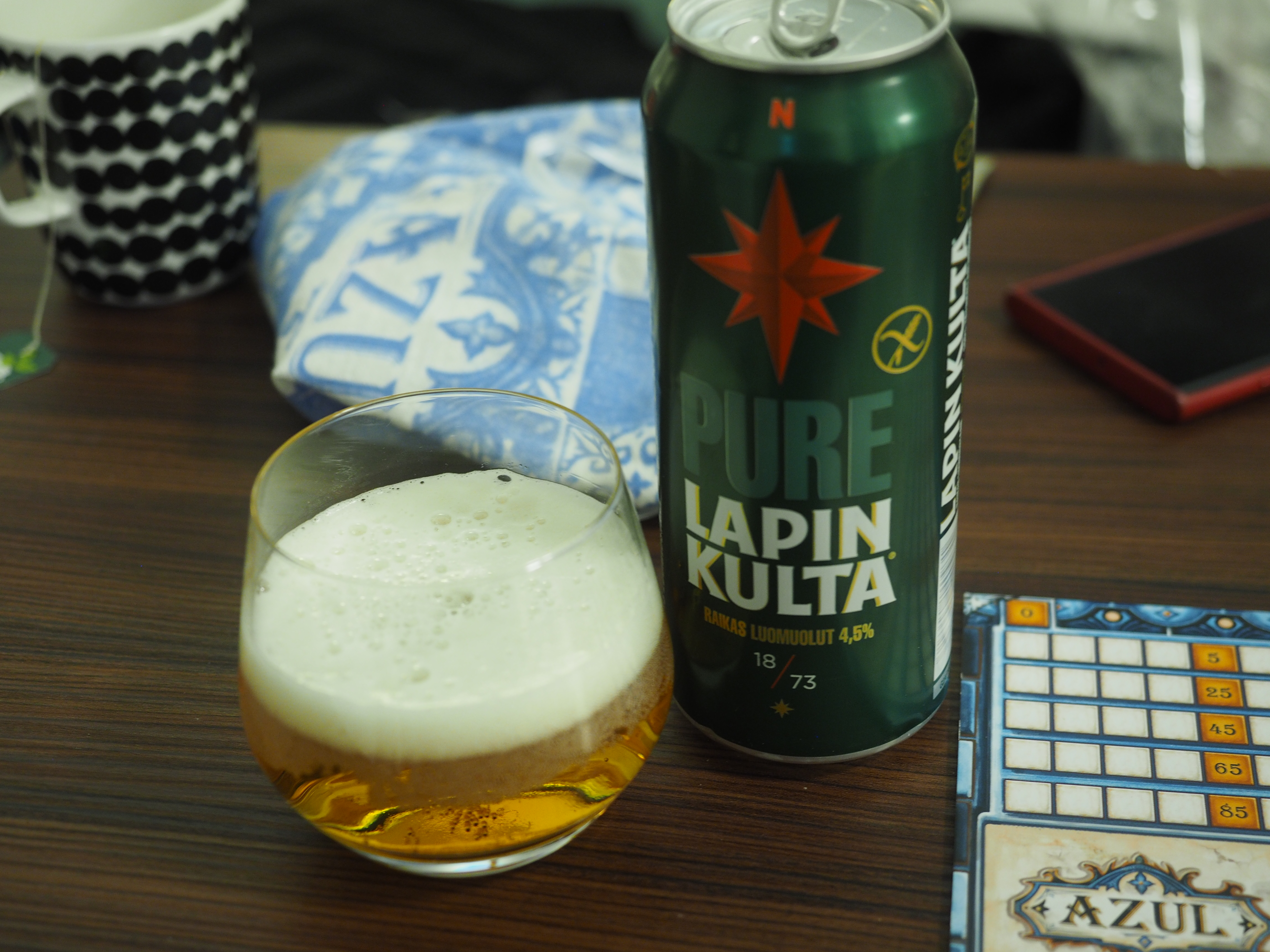
