= Sandels (beer) =

Finnish brand of beer

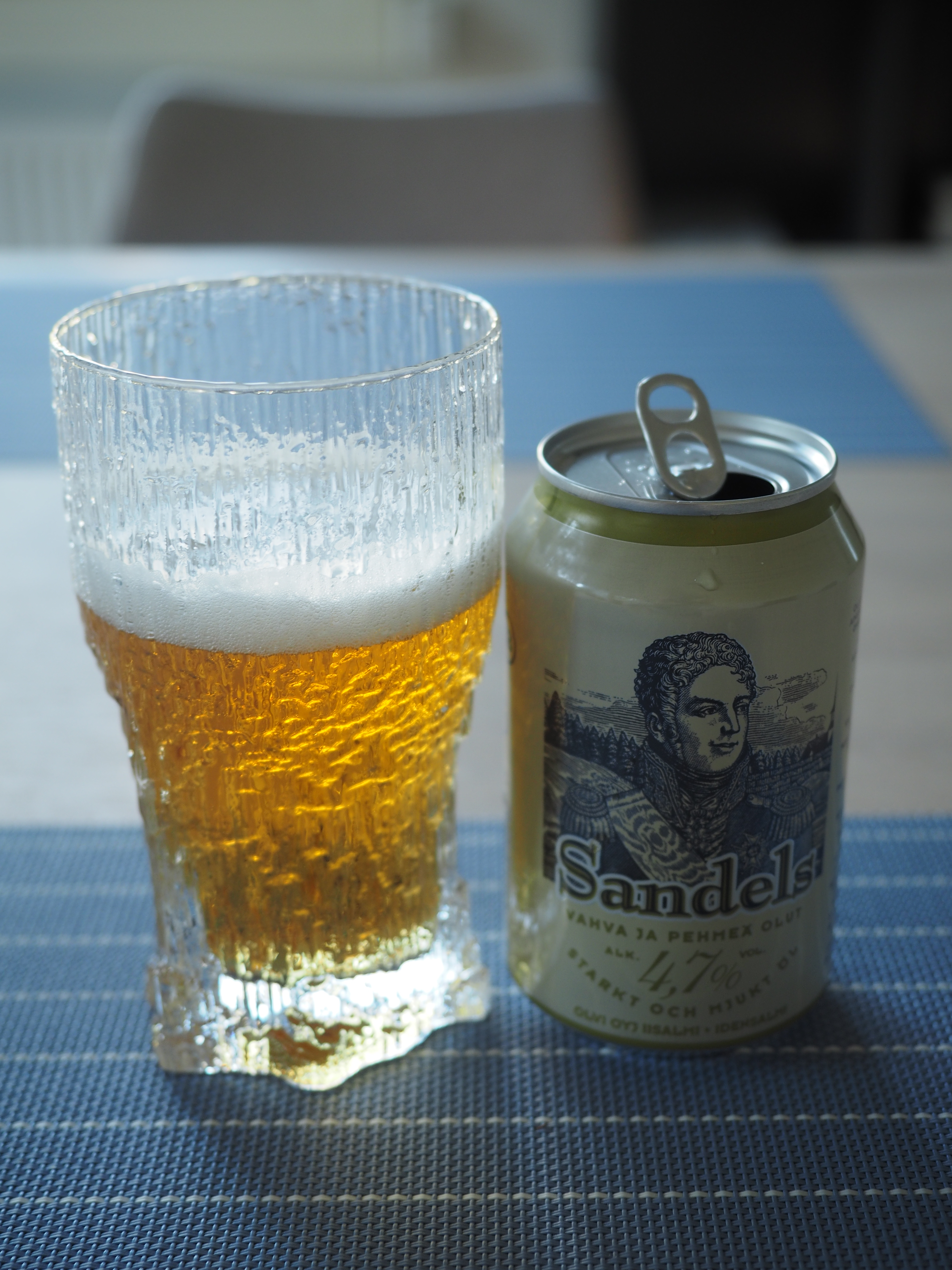
A can of Sandels beer

Sandels is a Finnish beer brand manufactured by the Olvi brewery since 1971. It is named after the Swedish field marshal and war hero of the Finnish War, Johan August Sandels (1764–1831). The cans and bottles of the beer contain anecdotes and sayings from Sandels's life, many of them related to beer. The regular Sandels is a pale lager, but other versions of the beer exist as well, some discontinued. Sandels was named the top rated beer brand in Finland in a 2015 study.

== Products ==
- Sandels 4,7 %
- Sandels 5,3 %
- Sandels Feast beer Unfiltered 5,3 %
- Sandels 7,5 %
