= Karhu (beer) =

Finnish beer brand

- Karhu logo
- Manufacturer: Sinebrychoff
- Introduced: 1898
- Alcohol by volume: 8.0% (Tosi Vahva Karhu); 5.4% (Karhu IVA); 4.6% (Karhu III)
- Style: Pale lager
- Original gravity: 16.5% PI (Tosi Vahva Karhu); 12.3% PI (Karhu IVA); 10.5% PI (Karhu III)
- IBU scale: 18 (Karhu III)
- Website: www.karhu.fi (in Finnish)

Karhu is a Finnish beer brand owned by the Sinebrychoff brewery, part of the Carlsberg Group. Karhu, meaning bear in Finnish, is a pale lager with a strong taste.

The brewing of Karhu began in 1929. The original Pori Brewery was bought by Sinebrychoff in 1972. From 2006 the beer has been made in a new brewery in Kerava. The Pori brewery was closed in 2009.

== Karhu beers ==
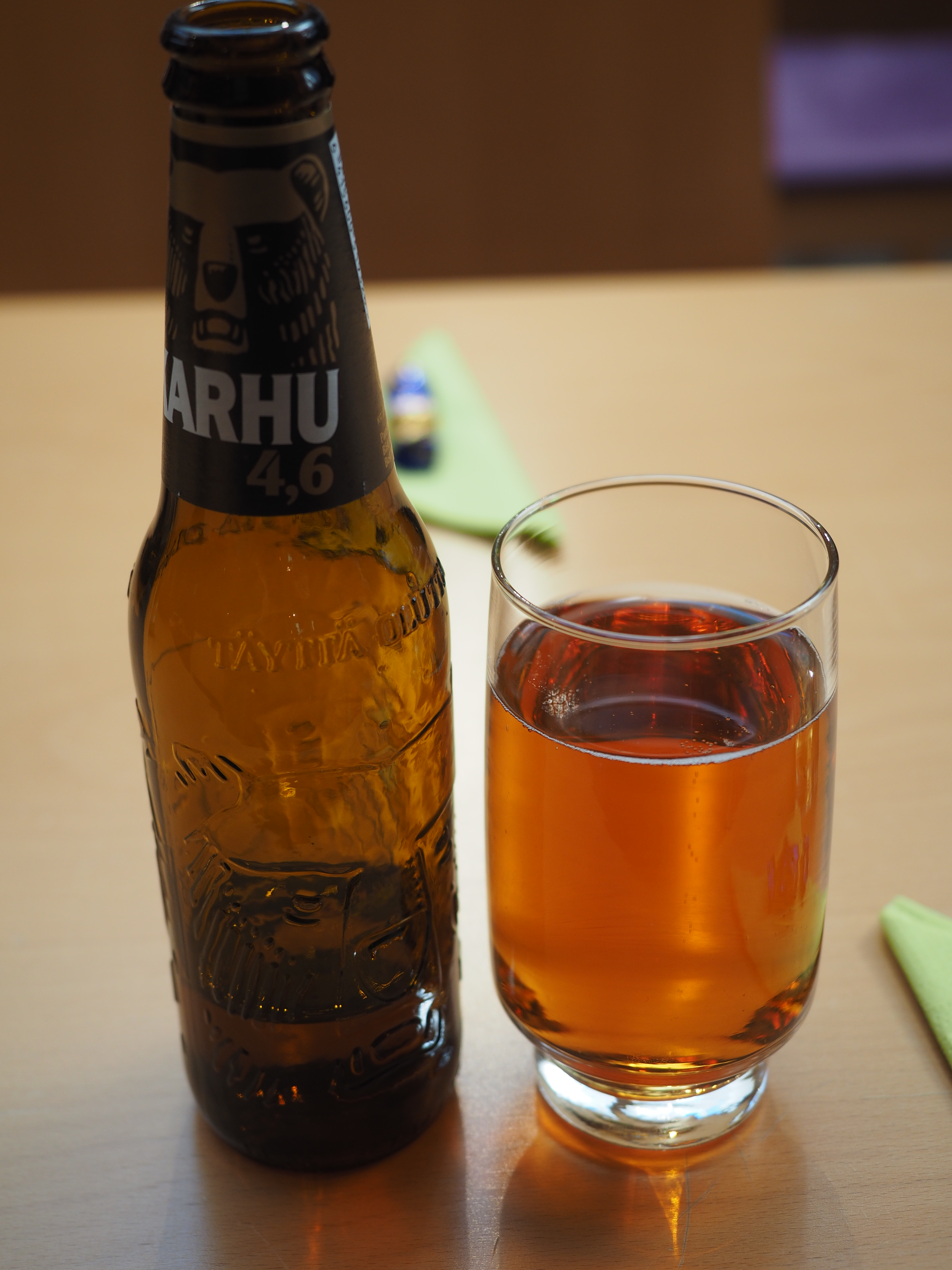
Karhu (4.6%)

Karhu's ingredients are water, barley, malt, barley starch and hops. The number in parentheses is alcohol percentage by volume (ABV).

- Karhu III (4.6% or 5.4%)
- Karhu A (5.3%)
- Karhu Real Strong (8.0%)
- Karhu Dark I (2.8%)
- Karhu Rye (4.6%)
- Karhu Double Hops (4.6%)
- Karhu Frosted (4.6%)

== Marketing slogans ==
- Seuraa itseäsi.
  - "Follow yourself."
- Karhu - täyttä olutta.
  - "Karhu is a full-bodied beer."

== See also ==
- Beer in Finland
