= Karjala (beer) =

Finnish lager-type beer

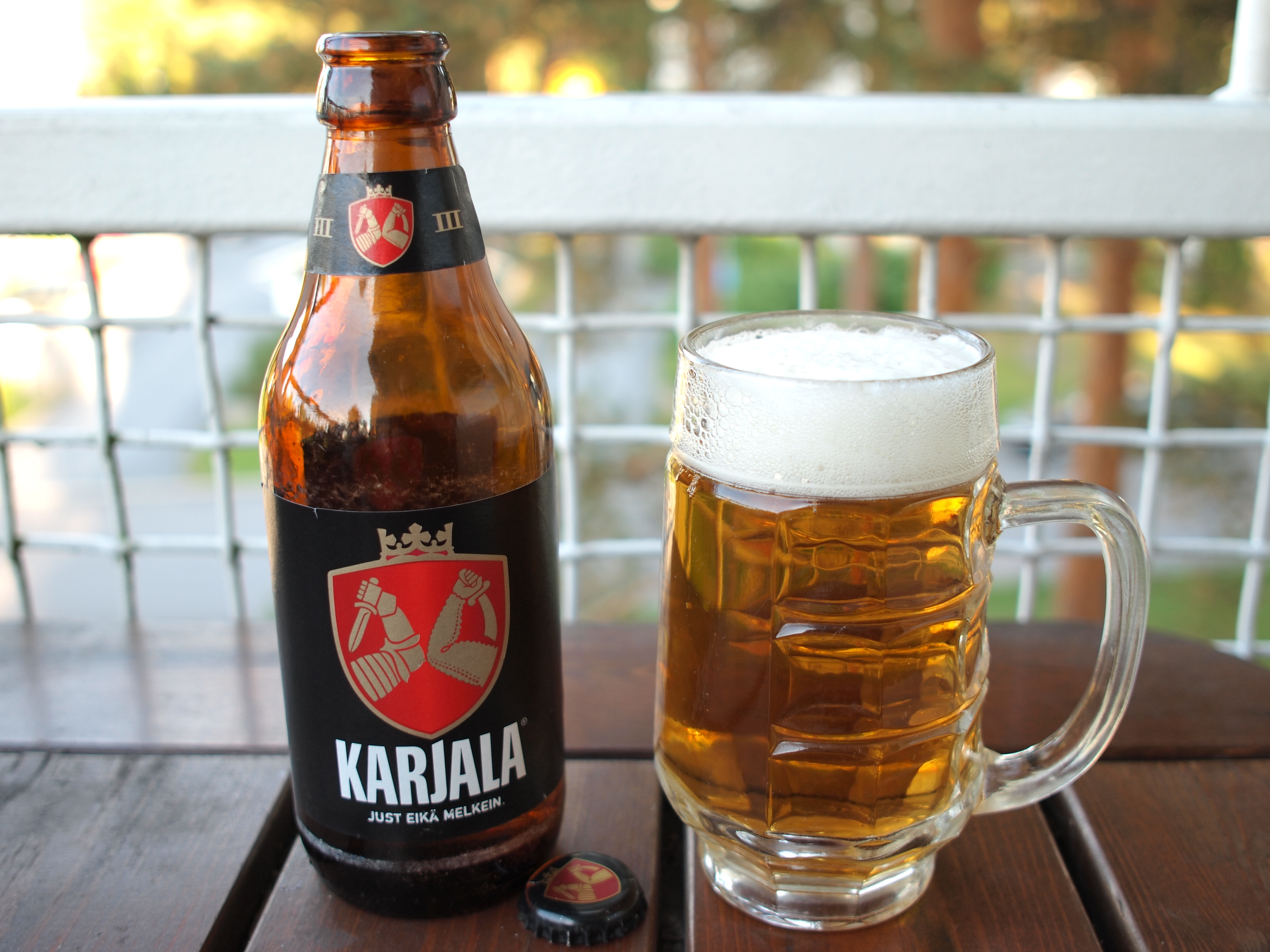
- Karjala III bottles
- Manufacturer: Hartwall
- Introduced: 1932
- Alcohol by volume: 8.0% IVB; 5.2% IVA; 4.6% III
- Style: Lager
- IBU scale: 28 (IVB); 21.5 (IVA); 18.5 (III)

Karjala is a Finnish lager type beer manufactured by the Hartwall brewery. Karjala beer was manufactured by the cooperative shop Osuusliike Itä-Karjala owned Sortavalan panimo Oy brewery from 1932 until 1944. Production was resumed in 1948.

During the 1960s, Karjala beer was already a fading brand until the Soviet Union's ambassador to Finland, Andrei E. Kovalev, stated in 1968 publicly that the label of Karjala beer evoked wrong perceptions from the war times. Karjala beer's label has the coat of arms of Karelia which features an arm wielding a straight western (Swedish) sword thrusting a Russian sabre wielded by another arm. The press noted the event with an article spanning 14 broadsheet pages, and Karjala-beer gained new steam as a brand. Later on, a proverb stating "Karelia back, even bottle by bottle" (Karjala takaisin, vaikka pullo kerrallaan.) was formed. As excise tax class III beer gained popularity, Karjala beer received the nickname "evacuee beer" evakkokalja, especially in eastern Finland, as it will "always return", tulloo aina takasi.

After Finland won the 1995 Ice Hockey World Championships, Hartwall launched a so-called "lion beer", which featured photos of all the players on the gold team on the bottle labels. The labels have become sought after by collectors. In late 2017, the lion beer was relaunched in a limited edition.

== Beers ==
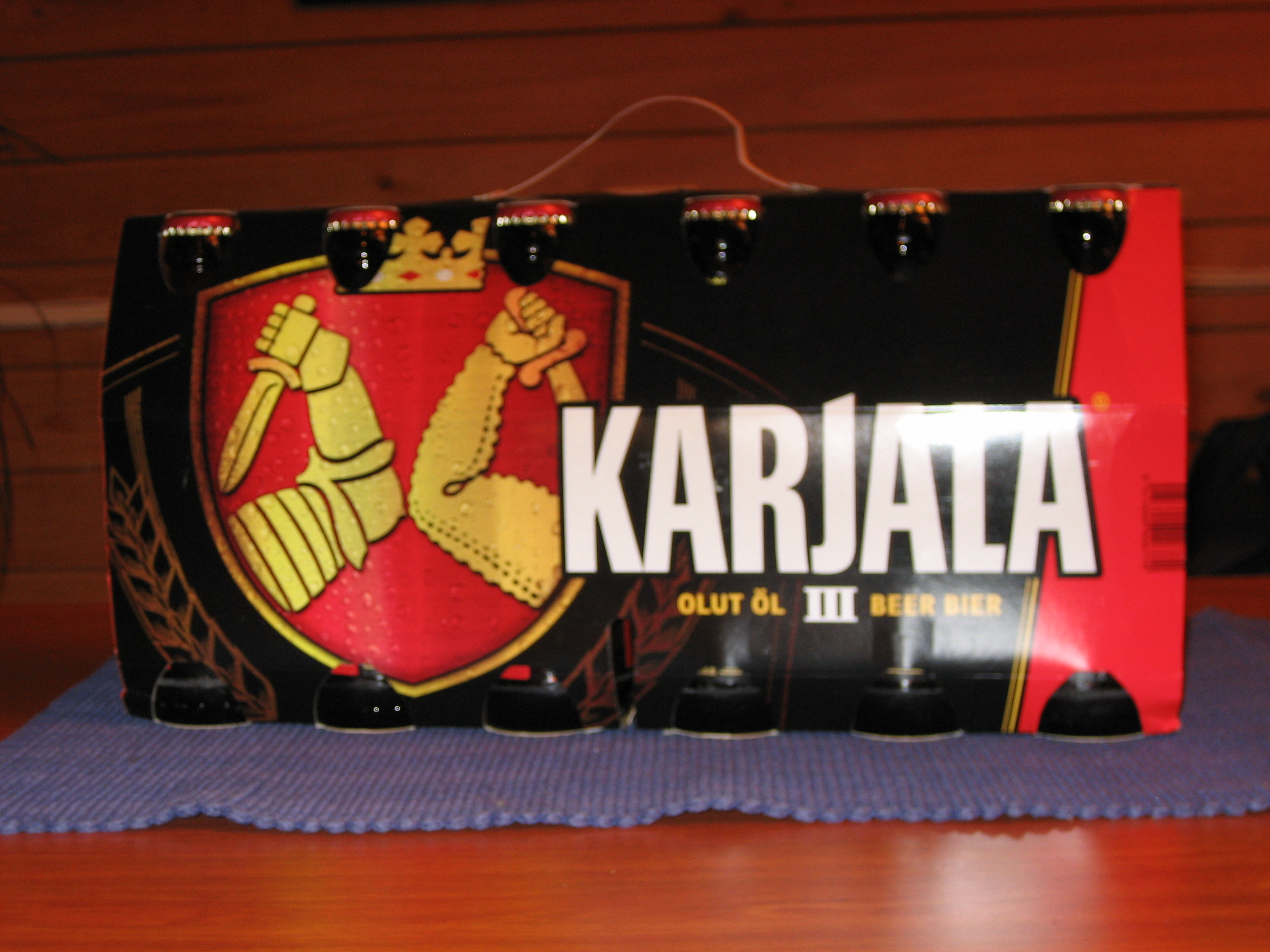
12-pack of 33 cl bottles of 4.6% strength Karjala beer

- Karjala III (4.6%)
- Karjala IVA (5.2%)
- Karjala IVB (8.0%)
- Karjala Terva (4.6%)
- Karjala Rehti (4.3%)

=== Discontinued beers ===
- Karjala I
- Karjala Terva
- Karjala Maltti

== See also ==
- Karjala Tournament
- Karelia
