= List of cocktails =

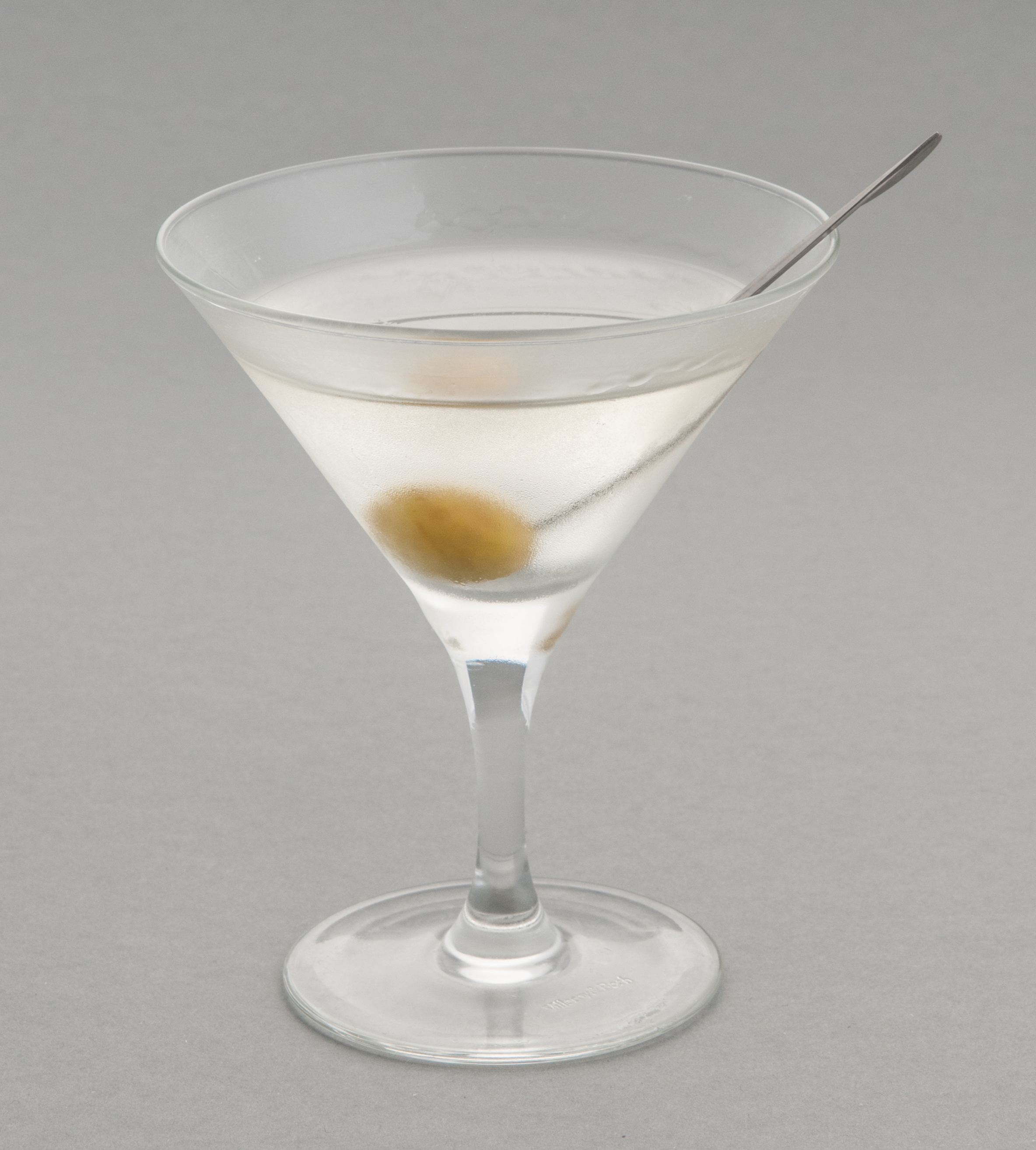
A martini cocktail

A cocktail is a mixed drink typically made with a distilled liquor (such as arrack, brandy, cachaça, gin, rum, tequila, vodka, or whiskey) as its base ingredient that is then mixed with other ingredients or garnishments. Sweetened liqueurs, wine, or beer may also serve as the base or be added. If beer is one of the ingredients, the drink is called a beer cocktail.

Cocktails often also contain various types of juice, fruit, honey, milk or cream, spices, or other flavorings. Cocktails may vary in their ingredients from bartender to bartender, and from region to region. Two creations may have the same name but taste very different because of differences in how the drinks are prepared.

This article is organized by the primary type of alcohol (by volume) contained in the beverage. Cocktails marked with "IBA" are designated as IBA official cocktails by the International Bartenders Association, and are some of the most popular cocktails worldwide.

== Absinthe ==
- Corpse reviver #2IBA
- Chrysanthemum
- Death in the Afternoon
- Sazerac IBA
- Tuxedo IBA

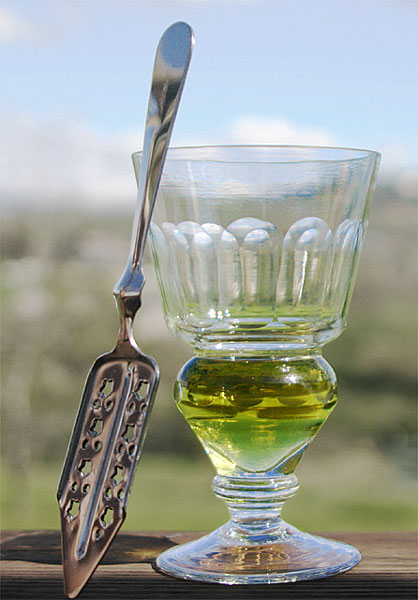
Reservoir glass with naturally coloured verte absinthe and an absinthe spoon

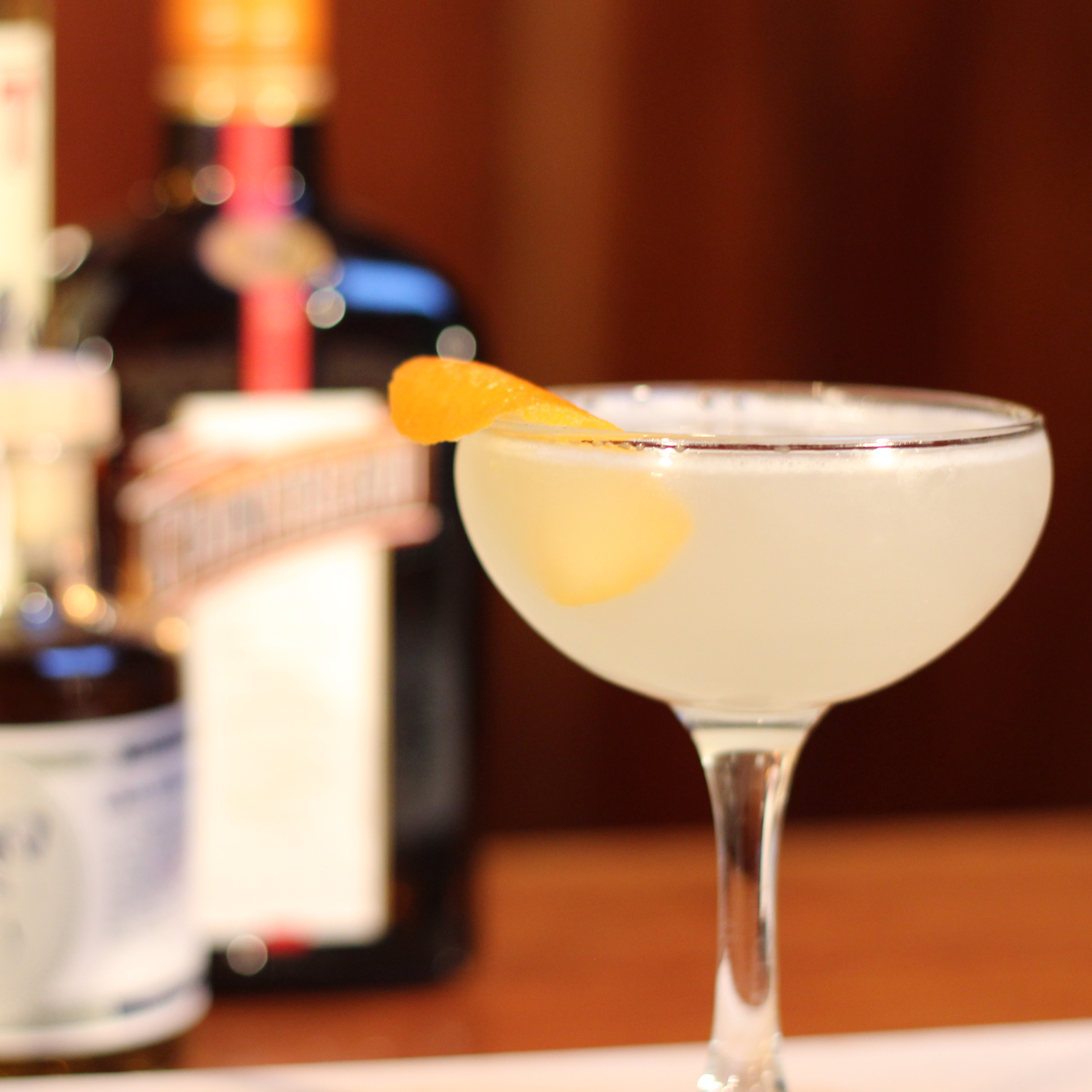
Corpse reviver #2

== Beer ==
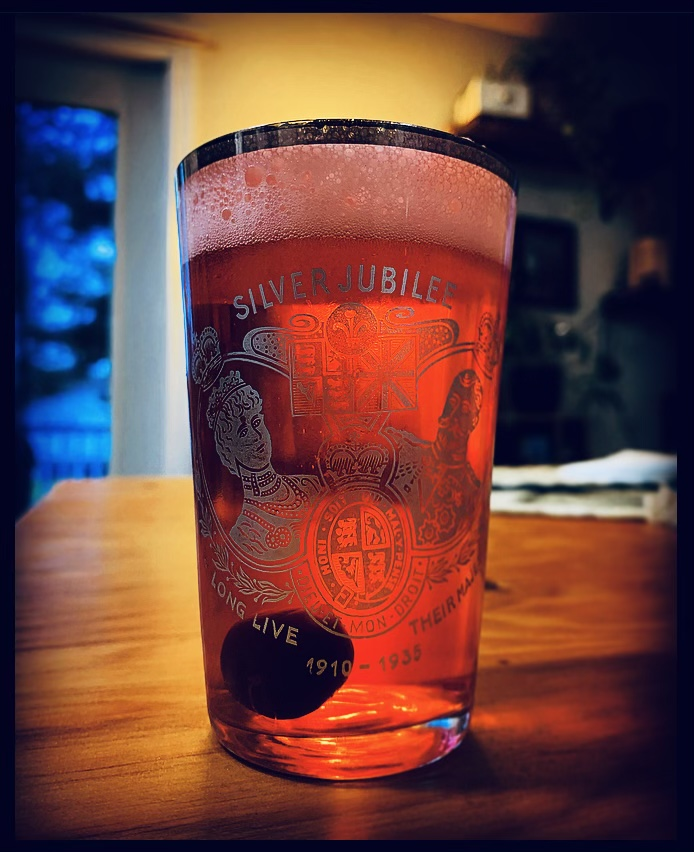
A Queen Mary beer cocktail: beer, grenadine and maraschino cherries

Cocktails made with beer are classified as beer cocktails.

- Black and tan
- Black velvet
- Boilermaker
- Hangman's blood
- Irish car bomb
- Michelada
- Monaco
- Porchcrawler
- Queen Mary
- Sake bomb
- Shandy
- Snakebite
- Spaghett
- U-boot

== Brandy ==
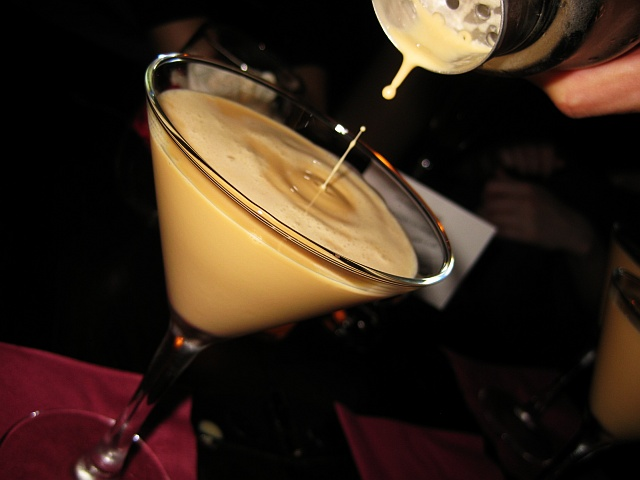
A Brandy Alexander being served

- Angel faceIBA
- Between the sheetsIBA
- Blow my skull
- Brandy AlexanderIBA
- Brandy crustaIBA
- Brandy old fashioned
- Brandy Manhattan
- Brandy sour
- Coow Woow
- Chicago cocktail
- Curaçao punch
- Diki-diki
- Four score
- French ConnectionIBA
- Hennchata
- Hoppel poppel
- Horse's neckIBA
- Incredible Hulk
- Jack Rose
- ParadiseIBA
- Pisco sourIBA
- Porto flipIBA
- Savoy affair
- Savoy corpse reviver
- SazeracIBA
- SidecarIBA
- Singapore slingIBA
- StingerIBA
- The Blenheim
- Tom and Jerry

== Cachaça ==
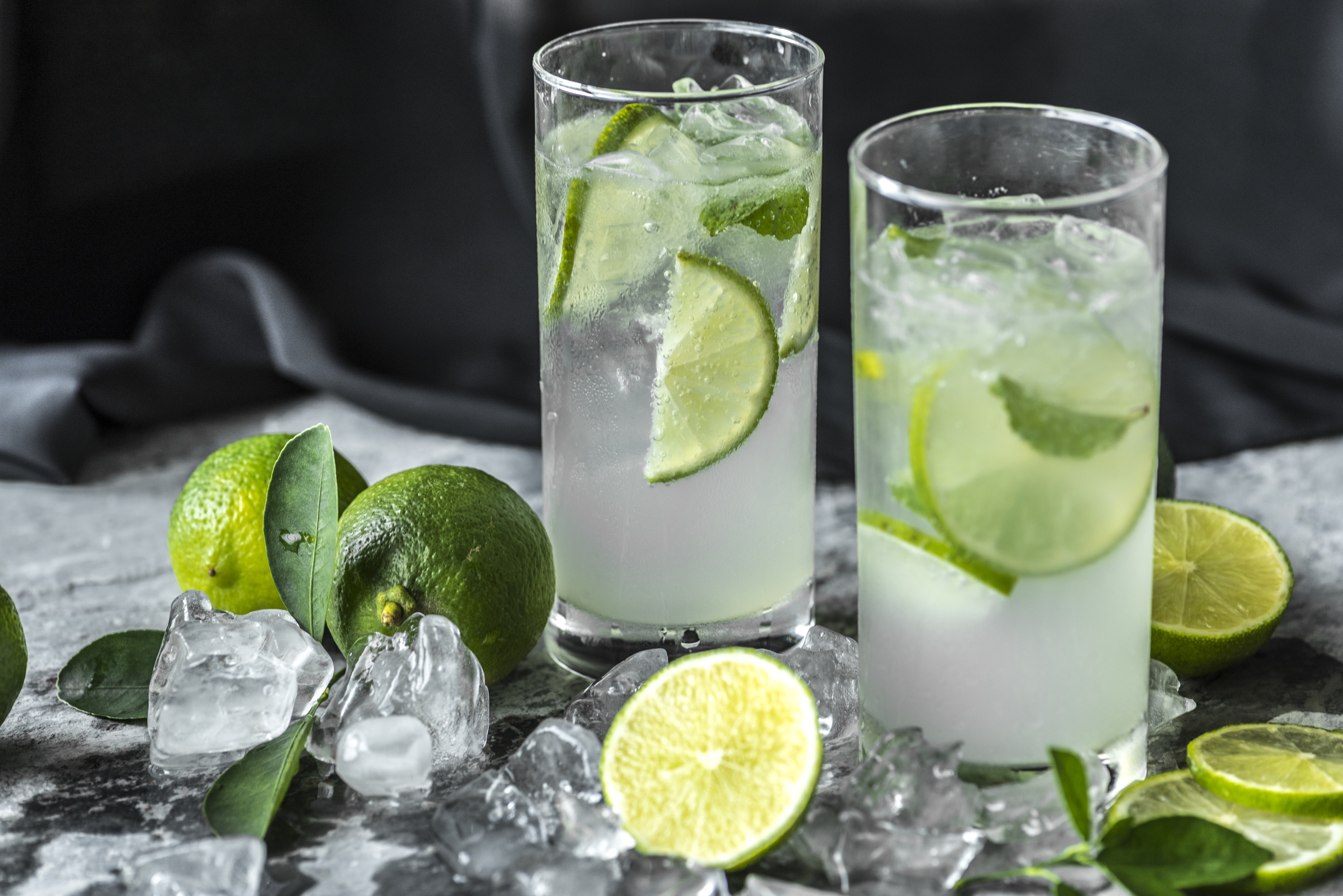
A Caipirinha with lime

- Batida
- CaipirinhaIBA
- Caju amigo
- Leite de onça
- Quentão
- Rabo-de-galo

== Gin ==
- 20th century
- Angel faceIBA
- AviationIBA
- Barbary coast
- Bee's kneesIBA
- Bijou
- Blackthorn
- Bloody Margaret
- Boston
- BrambleIBA
- Breakfast martini
- Bronx
- CasinoIBA
- Cloister
- Clover Club cocktailIBA
- Cooperstown cocktail
- Corpse reviver #2IBA
- Damn the weather
- Derby
- Fluffy duck
- French 75IBA
- Gibson
- Gimlet
- Gin and tonic
- Gin Basil SmashIBA
- Gin fizzIBA
- Gin pahit
- Gin sour
- Greyhound
- Hanky pankyIBA
- John CollinsIBA
- Last wordIBA
- Lime Rickey
- Long Island iced teaIBA
- Lorraine
- MartinezIBA
- MartiniIBA
- Monkey glandIBA
- Moon River
- My Fair Lady
- NegroniIBA
- Old Etonian
- ParadiseIBA
- Pegu club
- Pimm's cup
- Pink gin
- Pink lady
- Queens
- Ramos gin fizzIBA
- Royal arrival
- Salty dog
- Singapore slingIBA
- Suffering bastardIBA
- Takumi's aviation
- Tom Collins
- TuxedoIBA
- VesperIBA
- White lady or DelilahIBA
- Wolfram
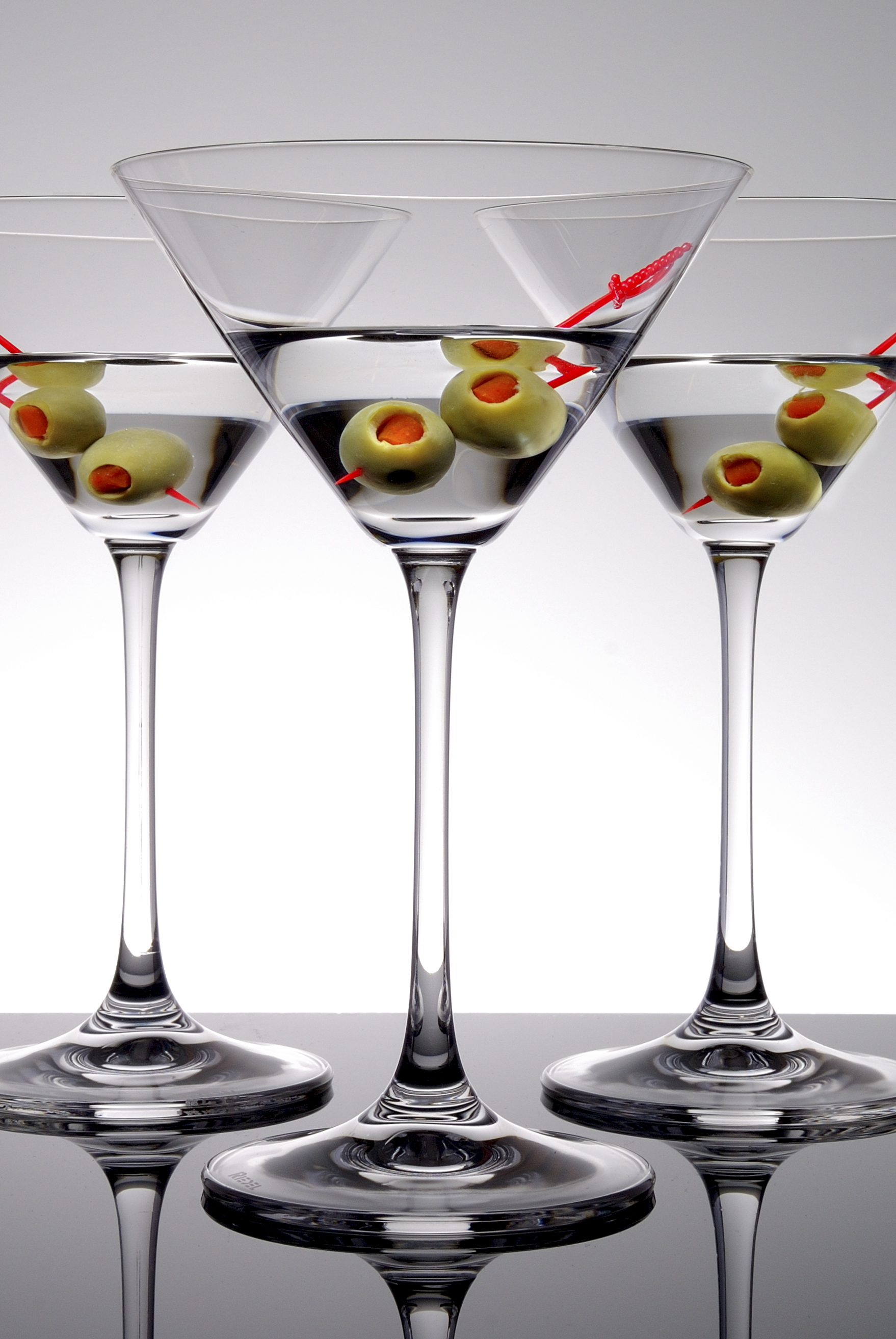
A martini is a classic gin-based cocktail.

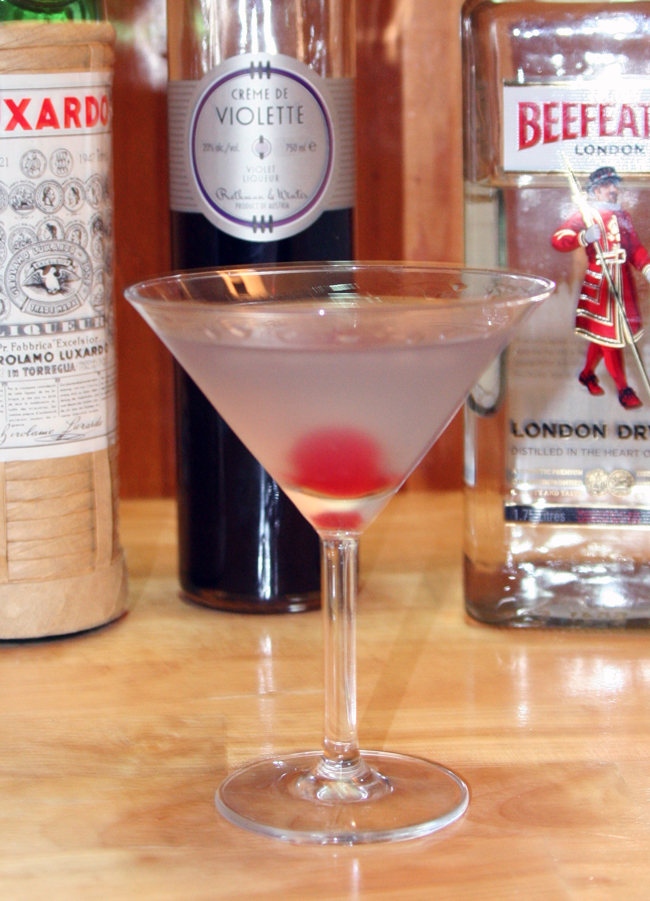
Aviation

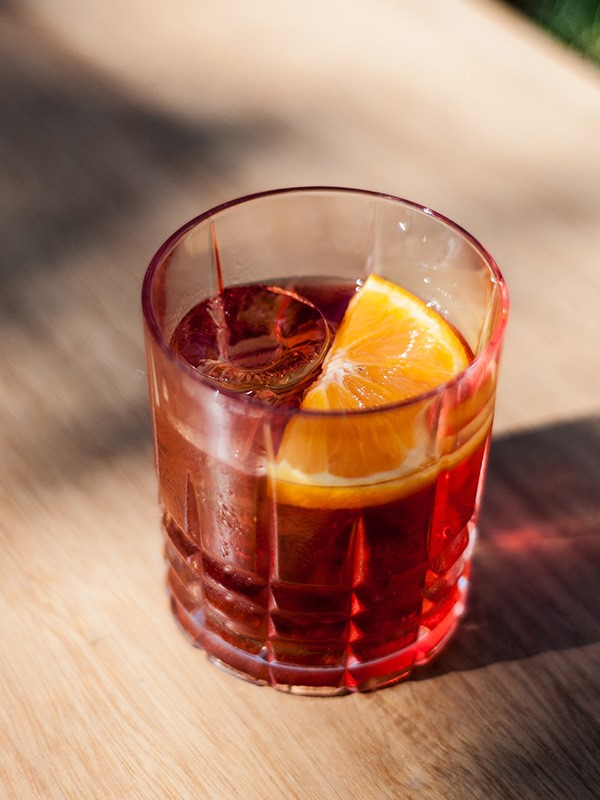
Negroni

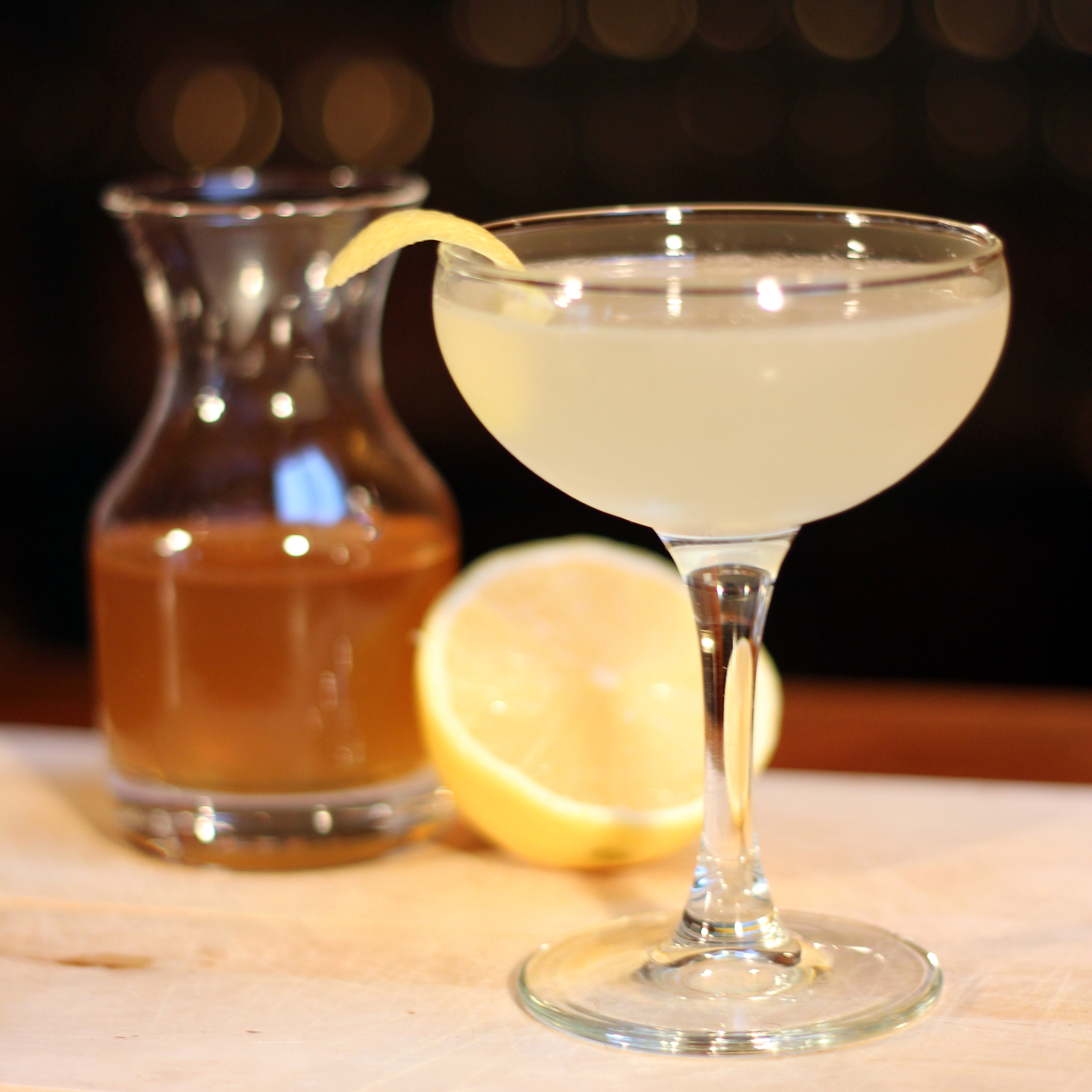
Bee's knees

== Mezcal ==
- Division bell
- IllegalIBA
- Medicina Latina
- Mezcal last word
- Mezcal Negroni
- Naked and famousIBA
- Oaxaca old fashioned
- Tia mia

== Rum ==
- Ancient Mariner
- Airmail
- Bacardi
- BarracudaIBA
- Between the sheetsIBA
- Blow my skull
- Blue Hawaii
- Blue Hawaiian
- Bumbo
- Bushwacker
- Cobra's fang
- Cojito
- Cremat
- Cuban sunset
- DaiquiriIBA
- Dark 'n' stormyIBA
- El Presidente
- Fish house punch
- Flaming Doctor Pepper
- Flaming volcano
- Fluffy duck
- Grog
- Gunfire
- Hoppel poppel
- Hot buttered rum
- Hurricane
- IBA TikiIBA
- Jagertee
- Jungle BirdIBA
- Long Island iced teaIBA
- Macuá
- Mai TaiIBA
- Mary PickfordIBA
- MojitoIBA
- Mr. Bali Hai
- Painkiller
- Piña coladaIBA
- Planter's punchIBA
- Q.B. Cooler
- Royal Bermuda
- Rum and Coke (a.k.a. Cuba libre)IBA
- Rum swizzle
- Suffering bastard (Trader Vic version)
- Sumatra Kula
- Test pilot
- Ti' punch
- Tom and Jerry
- Trumptini
- Tschunk
- Yellow birdIBA
- ZombieIBA
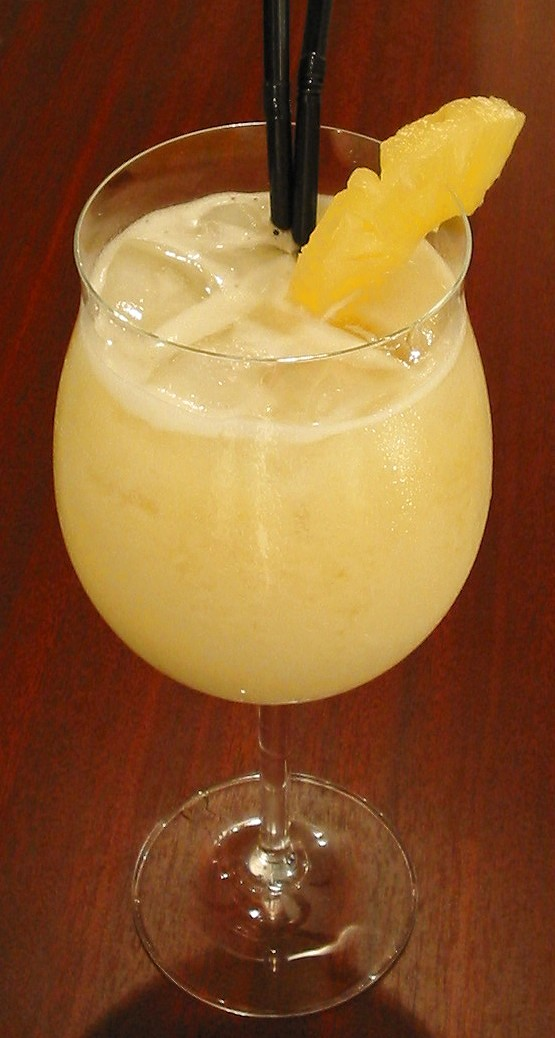
This fruity, blended piña colada is typical of many rum-based cocktails.

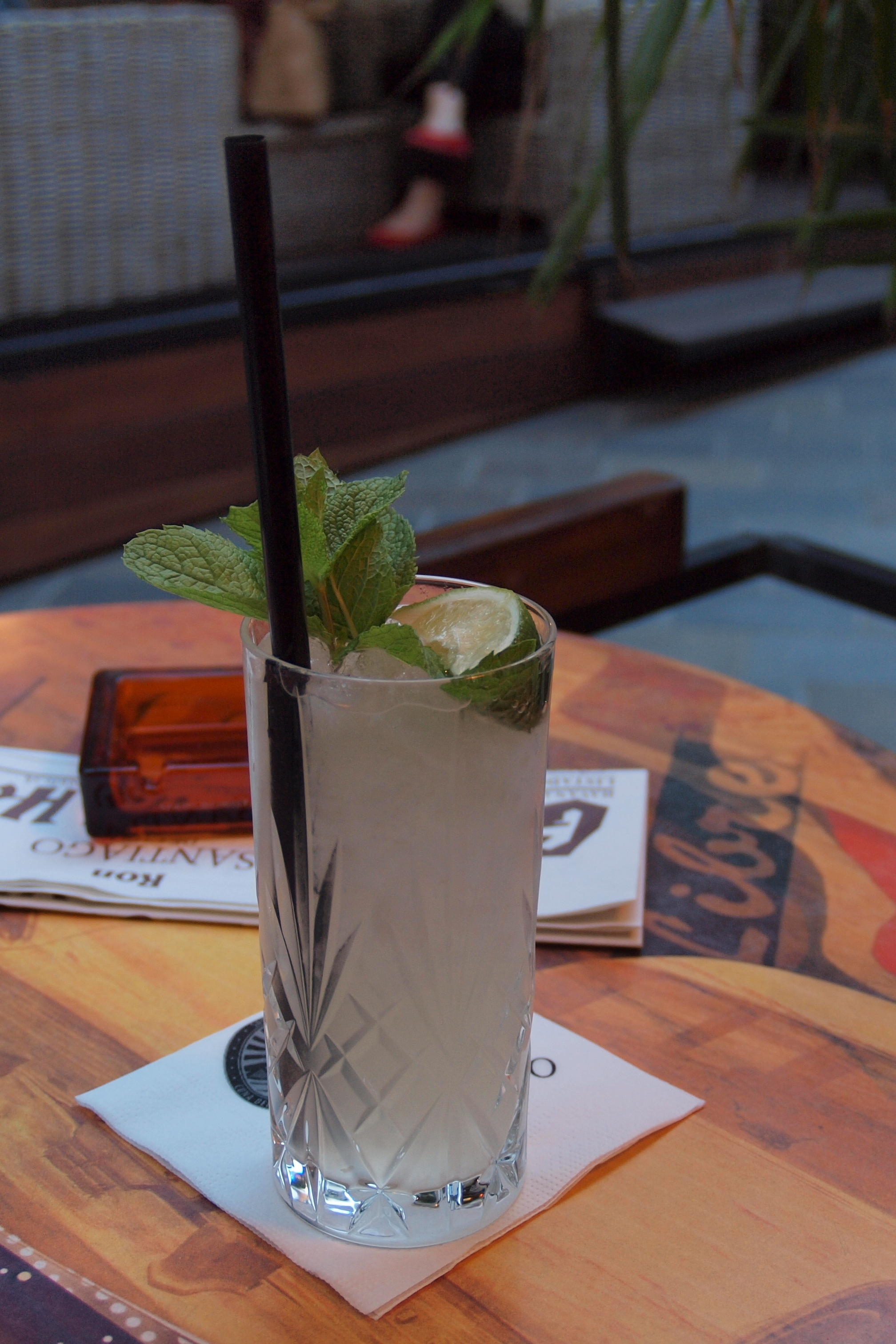
A mojito served in Slovakia

== Sake ==
- Sake bomb
- Saketini
- Tamagozake

== Tequila ==
- Boston tea party
- Batanga
- Bloody Maria
- Cantarito
- Chimayó cocktail
- Death Flip
- Harlem mugger
- Juan Collins
- Long Island iced teaIBA
- MargaritaIBA
- Matador
- Mexican martini
- Mojito blanco
- PalomaIBA
- Sangrita
- Tequila slammer
- Tequila sour
- Tequila sunriseIBA
- Tommy's margaritaIBA
- Vampiro
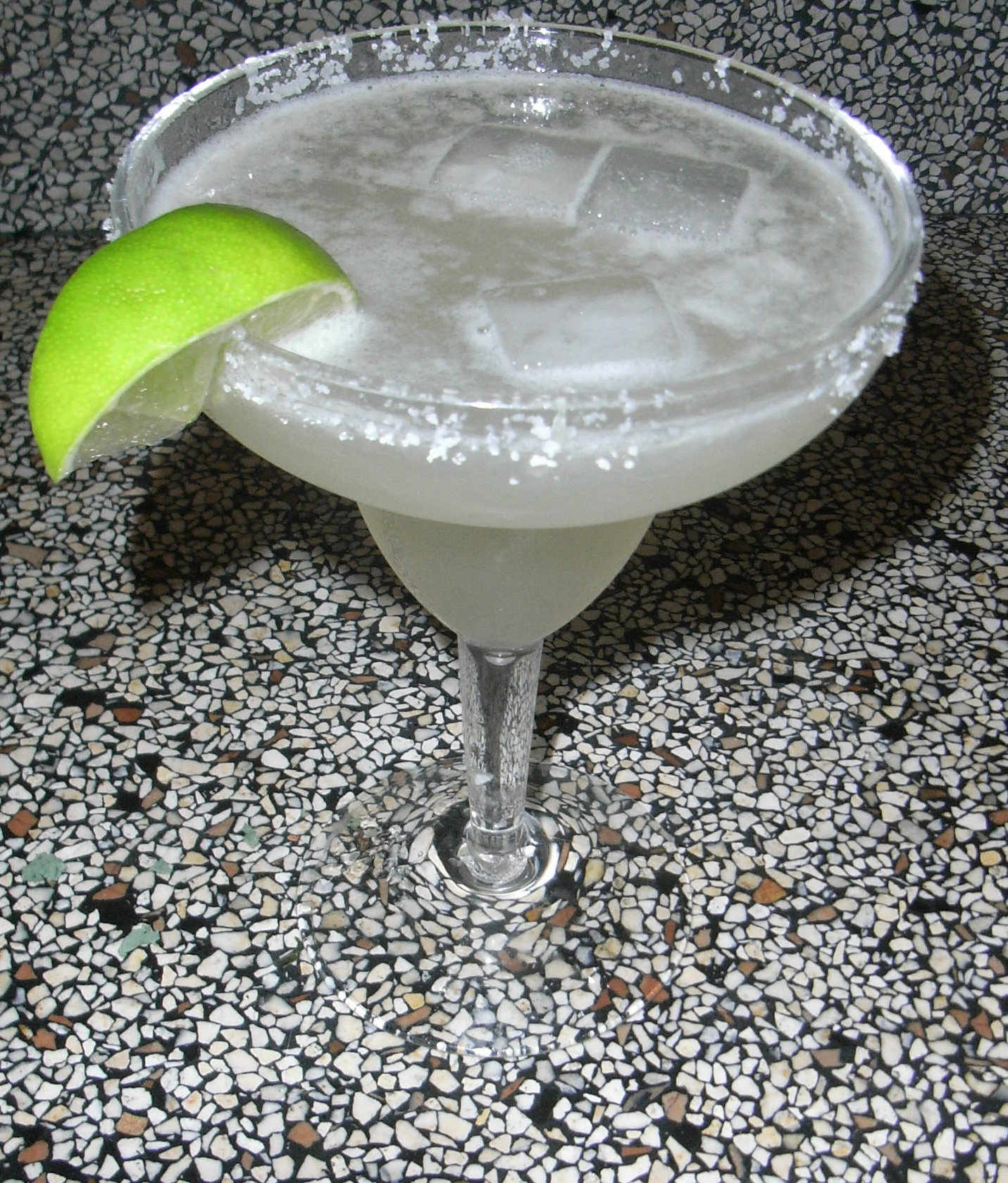
The margarita is the most popular cocktail in the U.S.

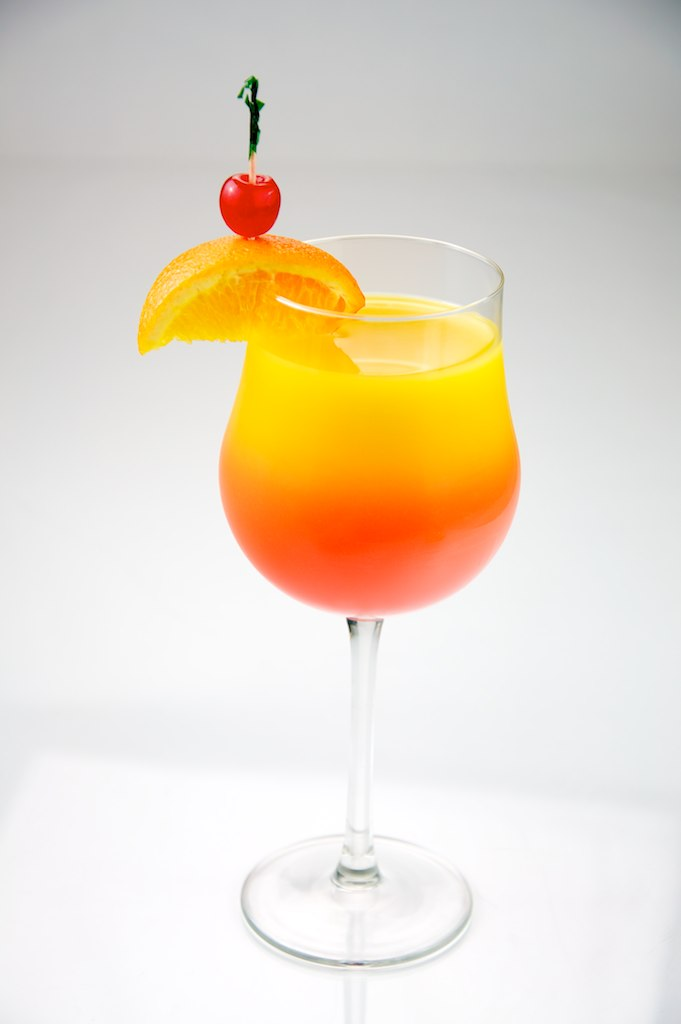
A tequila sunrise

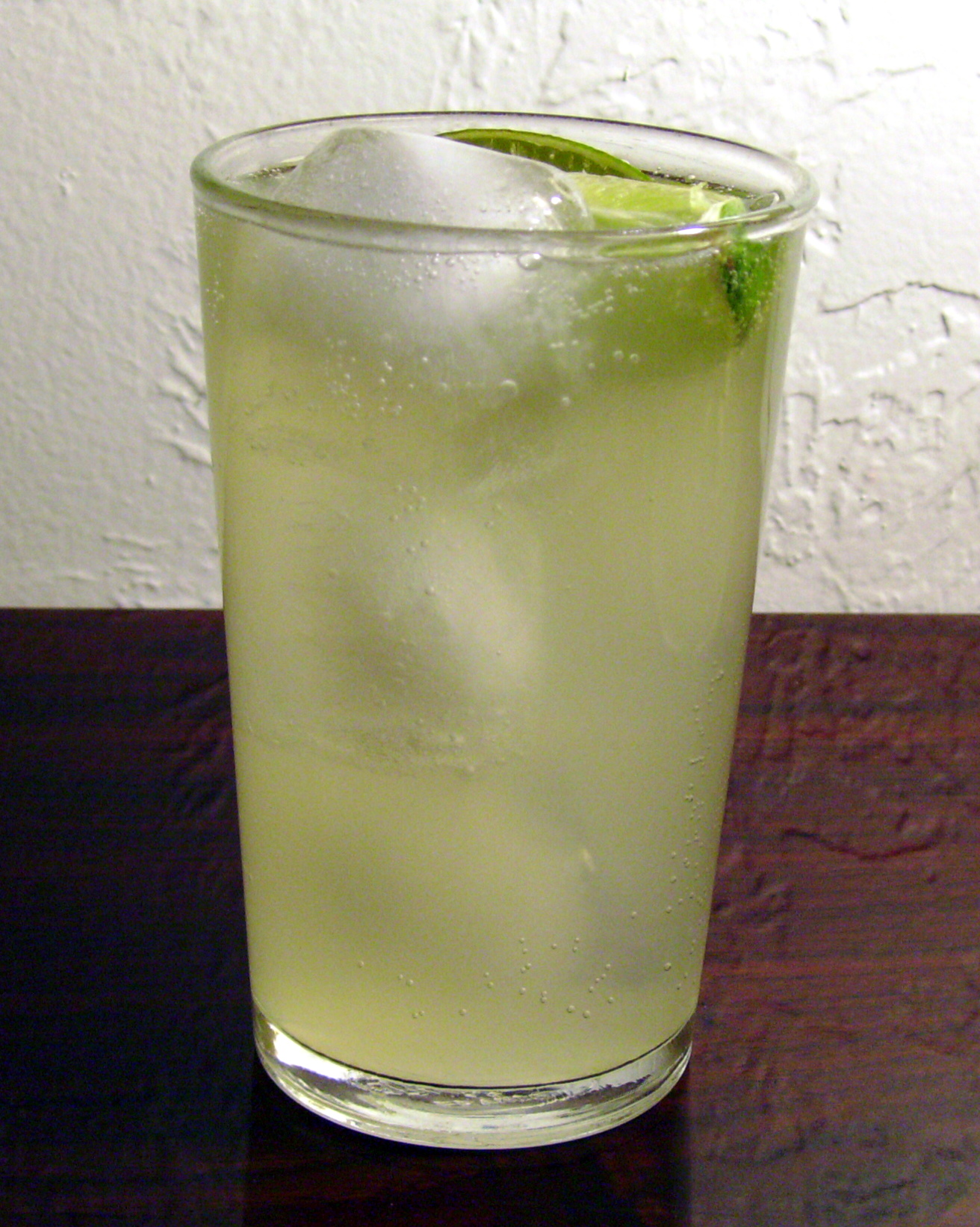
A paloma

== Vodka ==
- Apple martini (a.k.a. appletini)
- Astro pop
- Batida (a variation, traditionally made with cachaça)
- Bay breeze
- Black RussianIBA
- Bloody MaryIBA
- BLT cocktail
- Blue Lagoon
- Bull shot
- Caesar
- Caipiroska (a.k.a. caipivodka)
- Cape Codder
- Chi-chi
- Colombia
- CosmopolitanIBA
- Dirty Shirley
- Espresso martiniIBA
- Flirtini
- Gimlet
- Glowtini
- Godmother
- Greyhound
- Harvey Wallbanger
- John Daly (cocktail)
- Kamikaze
- Karsk
- Kensington Court special
- Lemon dropIBA
- Link up
- Long Island iced teaIBA
- Moscow muleIBA
- Platinum blonde
- Porn star martini
- Red Russian
- Rose Kennedy cocktail
- Salty dog
- Screwdriver
- Sea breezeIBA
- Sex on the beachIBA
- Spicy FiftyIBA
- Vargtass
- Venom
- VesperIBA
- Vodka gimlet
- Vodka martini (aka Kangaroo)
- White Russian
- Woo woo
- Wściekły pies
- Yorsh
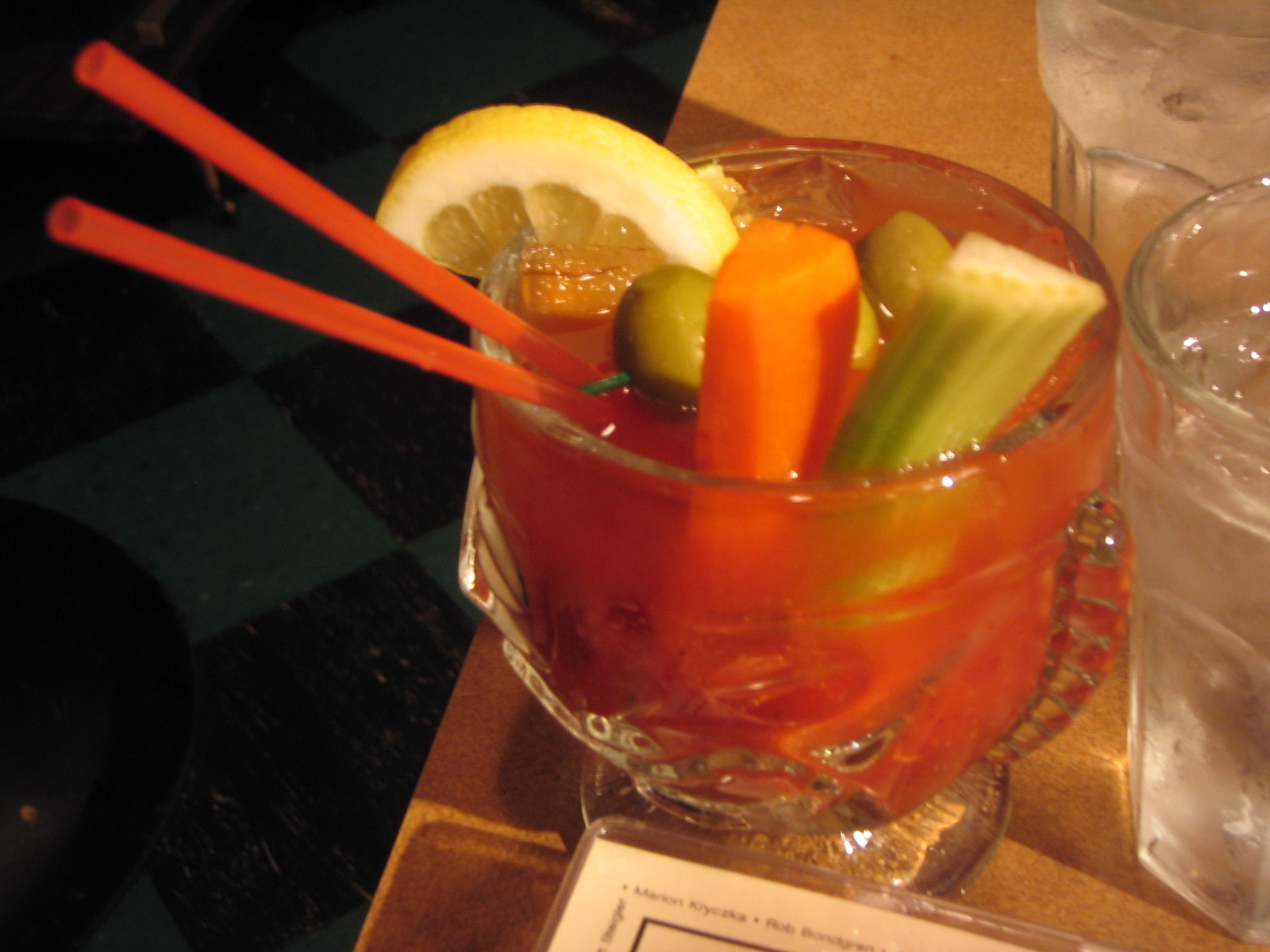
A Bloody Mary garnished with lemon, carrot, celery, and pitted manzanilla olives

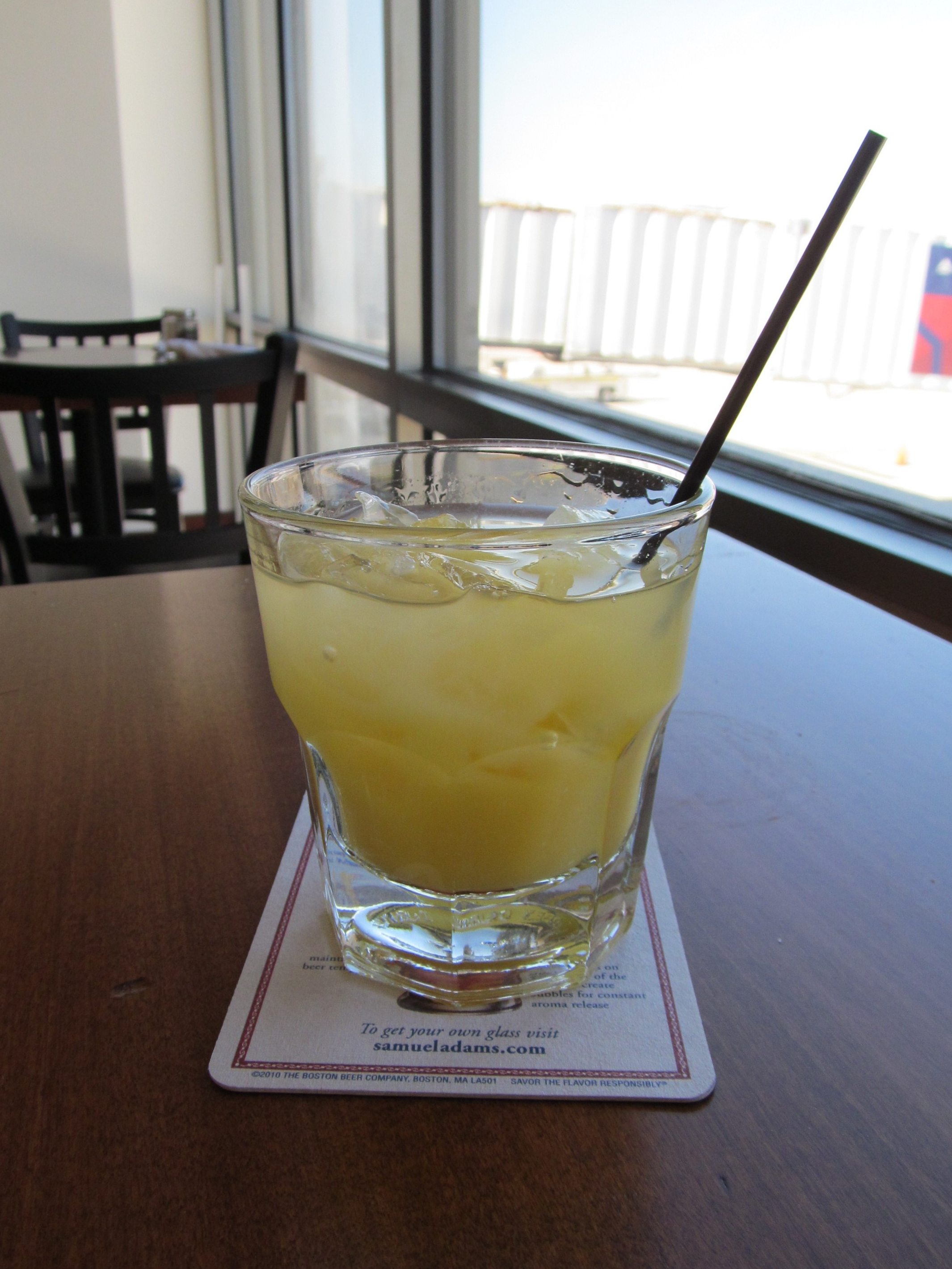
A screwdriver

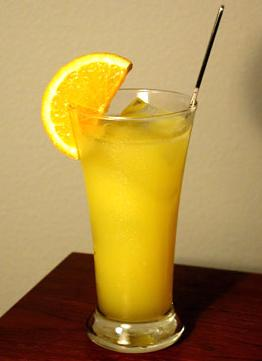
A Harvey Wallbanger

== Whisky ==
- Amber moon
- Black nail
- Blood and Sand
- Blue blazer
- Bobby Burns
- BoulevardierIBA
- Bourbon lancer
- Brooklyn
- Churchill
- Farnell
- Godfather
- Horsefeather
- Irish coffeeIBA
- Whiskey and Coke
- Lynchburg lemonade
- ManhattanIBA
- Mint julepIBA
- Missouri mule
- New York sour
- Nixon
- Old fashionedIBA
- Old pal
- Paper planeIBA
- PenicillinIBA
- Rob Roy
- Rusty nailIBA
- SazeracIBA
- Scotch and soda
- Seven and Seven or 7 & 7
- Three wise men
- Toronto
- Vieux CarréIBA
- Ward 8
- Whiskey sourIBA
- Whisky Mac
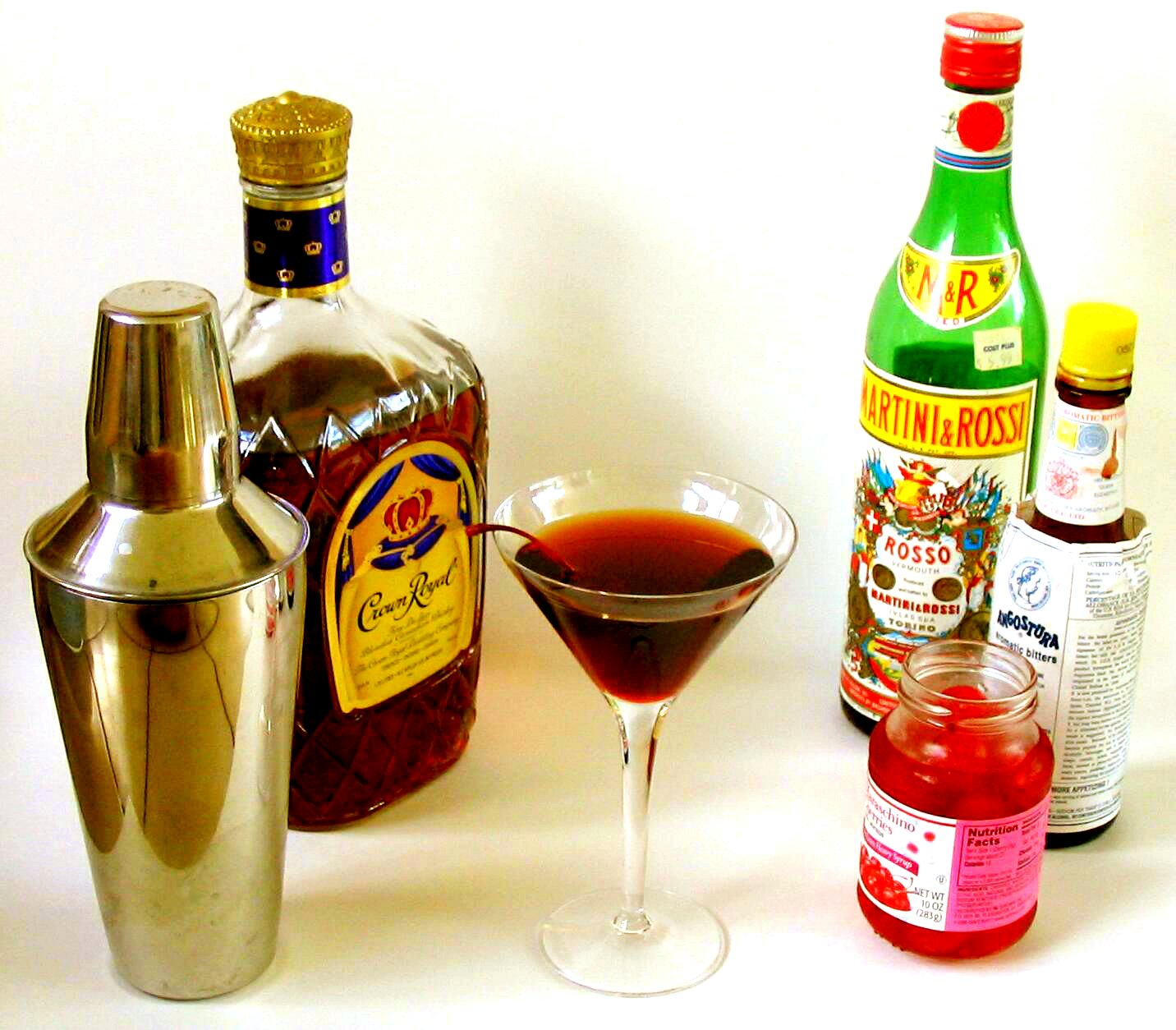
A Manhattan

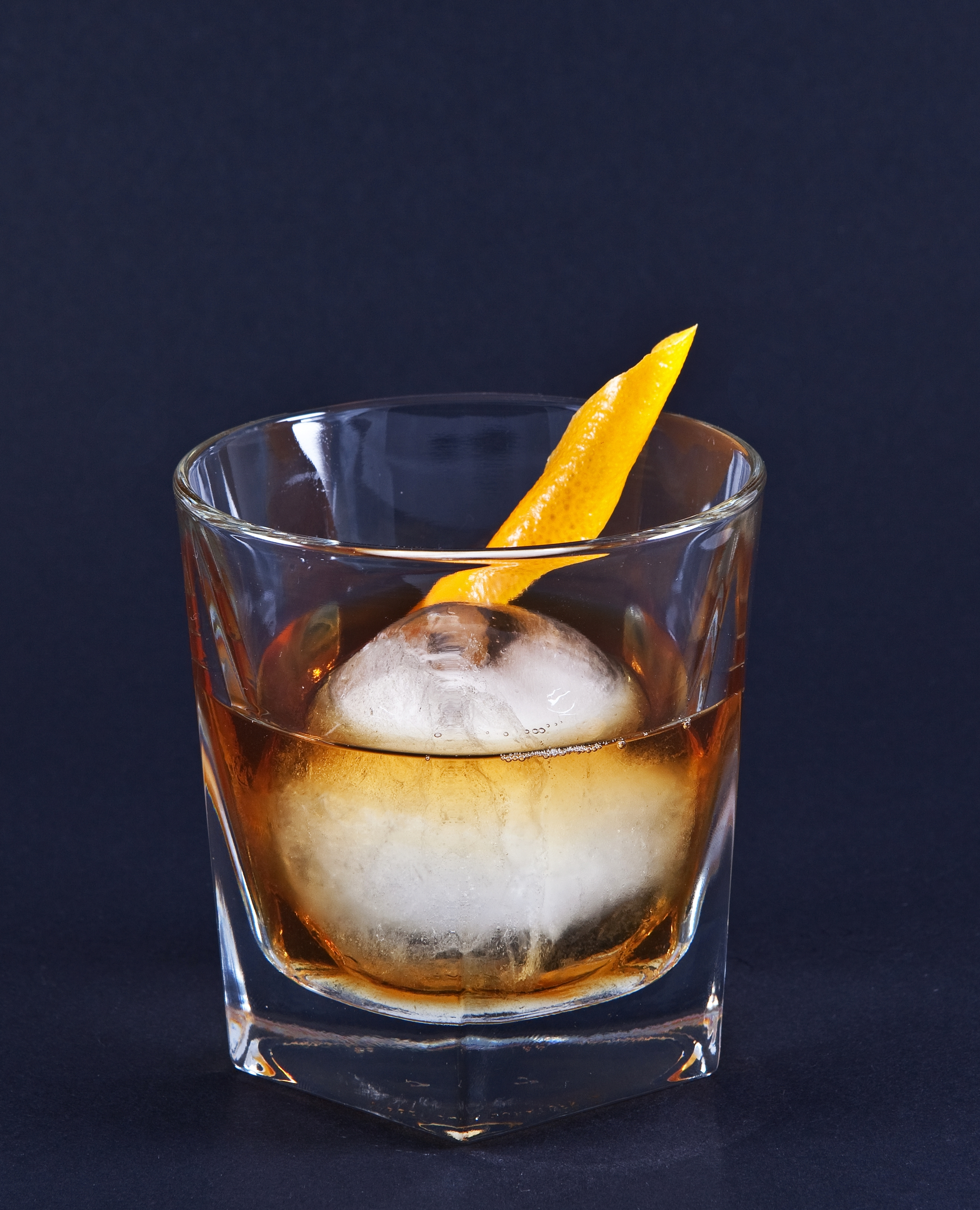
An old fashioned

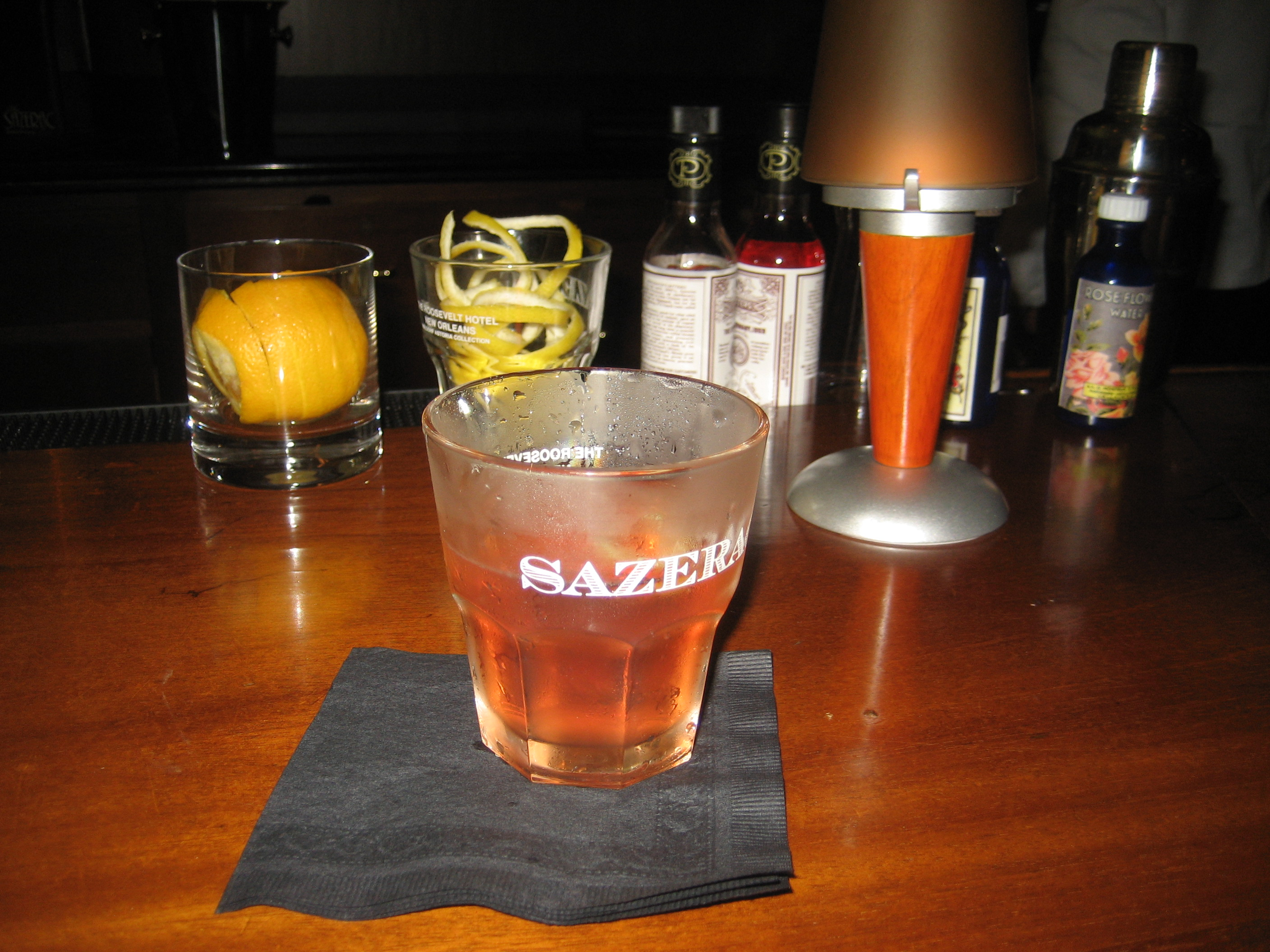
A Sazerac at the Sazerac Bar, The Roosevelt New Orleans Hotel

== Wines ==
=== Fortified wines ===
- Port wine: Cheeky Vimto
- Port wine: Portbuka
- Sherry: Rebujito
- Sherry: Up to date
- Vermouth: AmericanoIBA
- Vermouth: BoulevardierIBA
- Vermouth: Hanky pankyIBA
- Vermouth: Rose
- Sherry and vermouth: Adonis

=== Wine ===
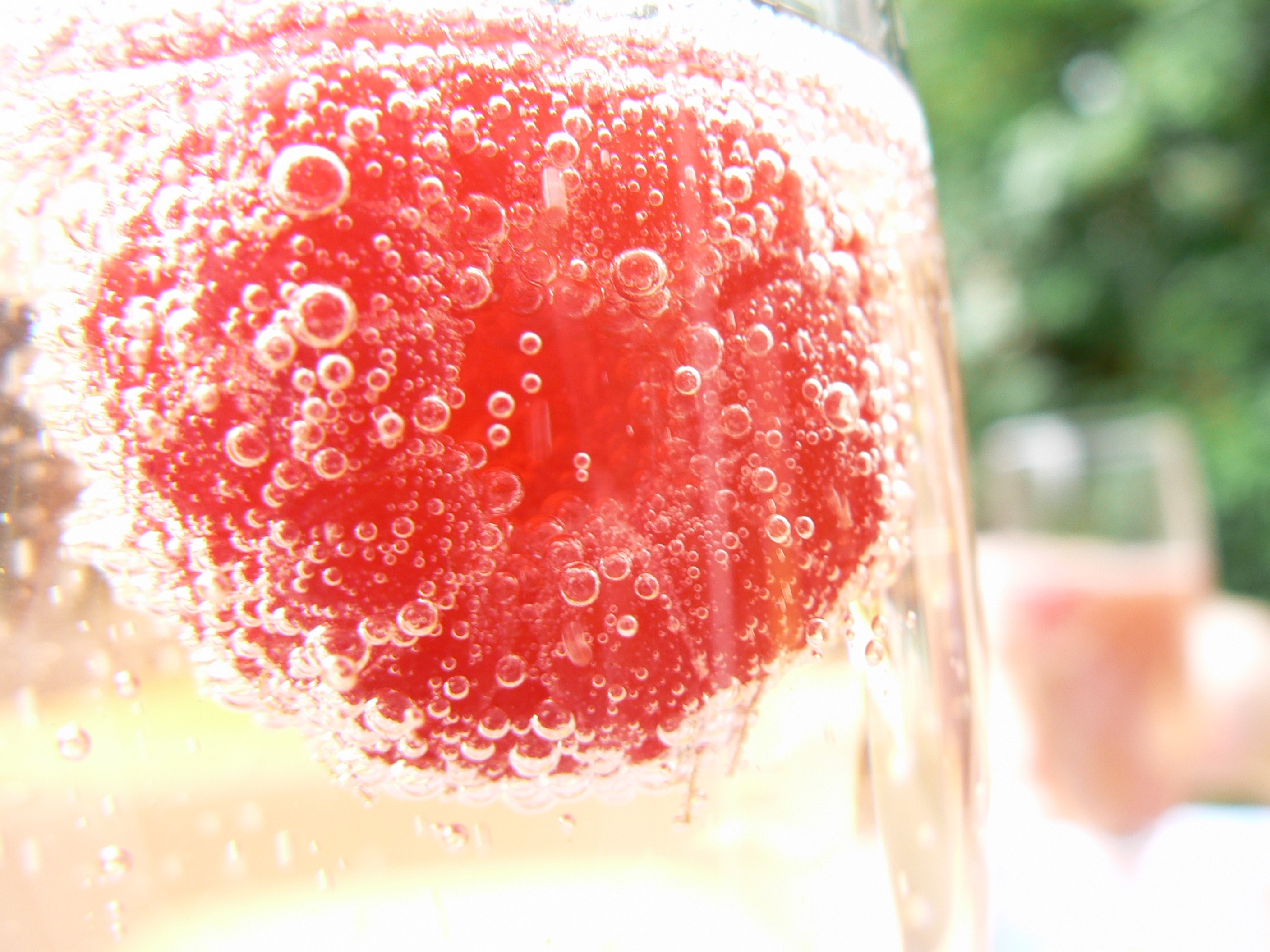
A Champagne cocktail with a raspberry garnish

==== Wine variation ====
- Agua de Valencia
- Black velvet
- Death in the Afternoon
- Flirtini
- Prince of Wales

==== Sparkling wine ====
- Agua de Sevilla
- SpritzIBA
- BelliniIBA
- Hugo
- Rossini

==== Champagne ====
- Atomic
- Black velvet
- Chambord Royale
- Champagne cocktailIBA
- French 75IBA
- Kir royal
- Mimosa (a.k.a. Buck's fizz)IBA
- Ochsenblut

==== Red wine ====
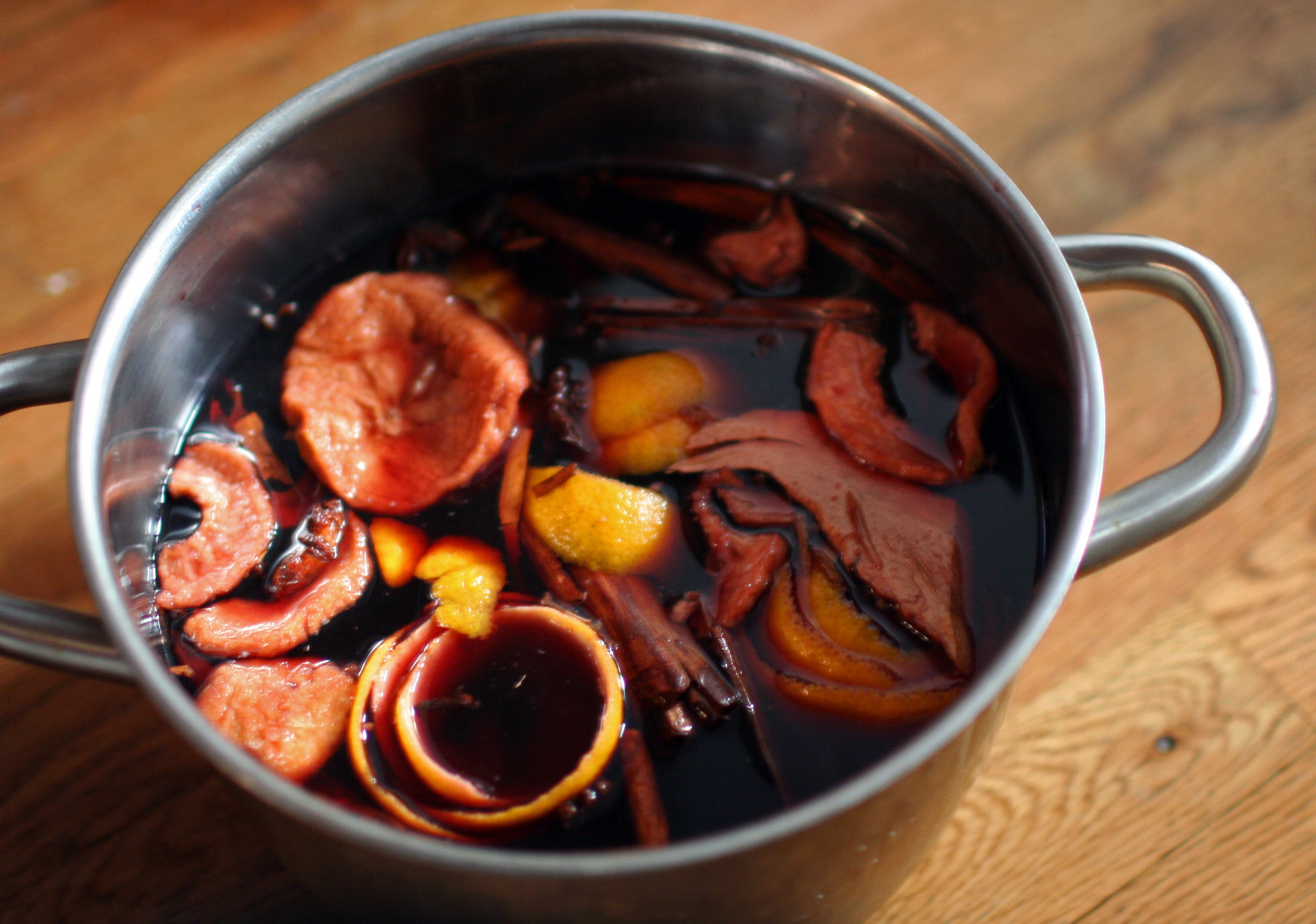
Mulled wine steeping (Swedish glögg)

- Calimocho or Kalimotxo
- Claret cup
- Mulled wine (Glögg)
- Tinto de verano
- Zurracapote

==== White wine ====
- KirIBA
- Spritzer

== Flavored liqueurs ==
=== Anise-flavored liqueurs ===
Herbsaint

- Herbsaint frappé

Pastis

- Mauresque
- Perroquet
- Rourou
- Tomate

=== Chocolate liqueur ===
- Chocolate martini

=== Coffee liqueurs ===
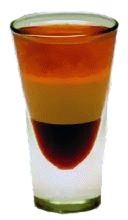
A B-52

Coffee-flavored drinks

- B-52 (and related B-50 series cocktails)
- Baby Guinness
- Black RussianIBA
- Espresso martiniIBA
- Moose milk
- Orgasm
- White Russian

=== Cream liqueur ===
A liqueur containing cream, imparting a milkshake-like flavor

- B-52 (and related B-50 series cocktails)
- Baby Guinness
- Cement mixer
- Irish car bomb
- Oatmeal cookie
- Orgasm
- Quick fuck
- Slippery nipple
- Springbokkie

=== Crème liqueur ===
Crème de menthe – green

An intensely green, mint-flavored liqueur

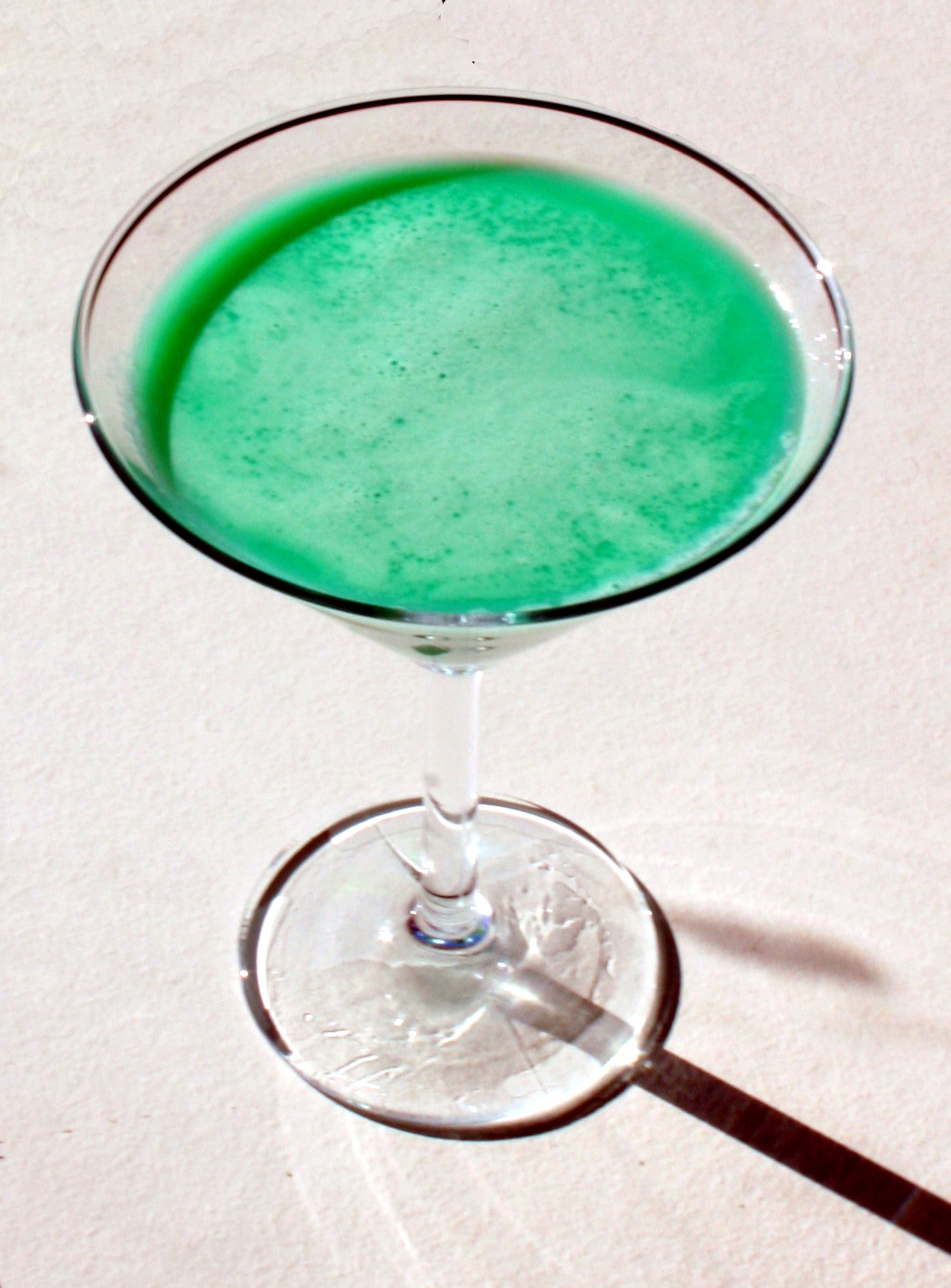
A grasshopper

- Grasshopper IBA
- Springbokkie

Crème de menthe – white

A colorless mint-flavored liqueur

- Brandy AlexanderIBA
- Revelation
- StingerIBA

Crème de violette

- AviationIBA

=== Fruit liqueurs ===
==== Apple-flavored ====
- Apple-kneel

==== Orange-flavored ====
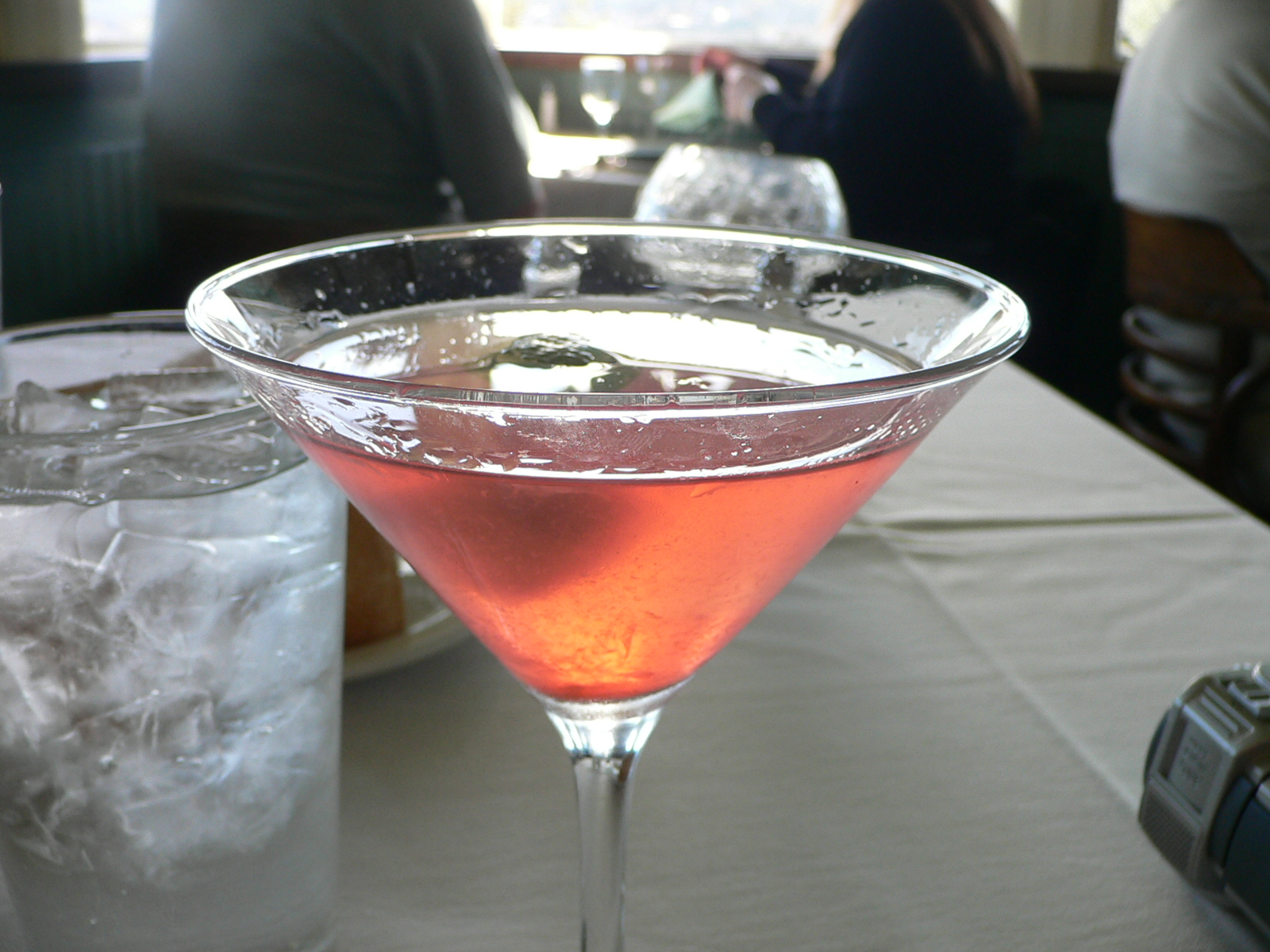
A cosmopolitan

One of several orange-flavored liqueurs, like Grand Marnier, triple sec, or Curaçao

- Golden doublet
- Golden dreamIBA
- Moonwalk
- Skittle bomb

==== Other fruit flavors ====
Midori

A clear, bright-green, melon-flavored liqueur

- Melon ball
- Japanese slipper
- Tequila sour

=== Nut-flavored liqueurs ===
Almond-flavored liqueurs

- Alabama slammer
- Amaretto sour
- Blueberry tea
- French ConnectionIBA
- Godfather
- Godmother
- Orgasm

=== Swedish punsch-flavored cocktails ===
- Boomerang (cocktail)
- Diki-diki
- Doctor (cocktail)
- Malecon

=== Misc. liqueur-based cocktails ===
- Backdraft (also a pepperdraft variation)
- Carrot cake
- Common market
- Jägerbomb
- Snowball – advocaat and soda lemonade

== Less common spirits ==
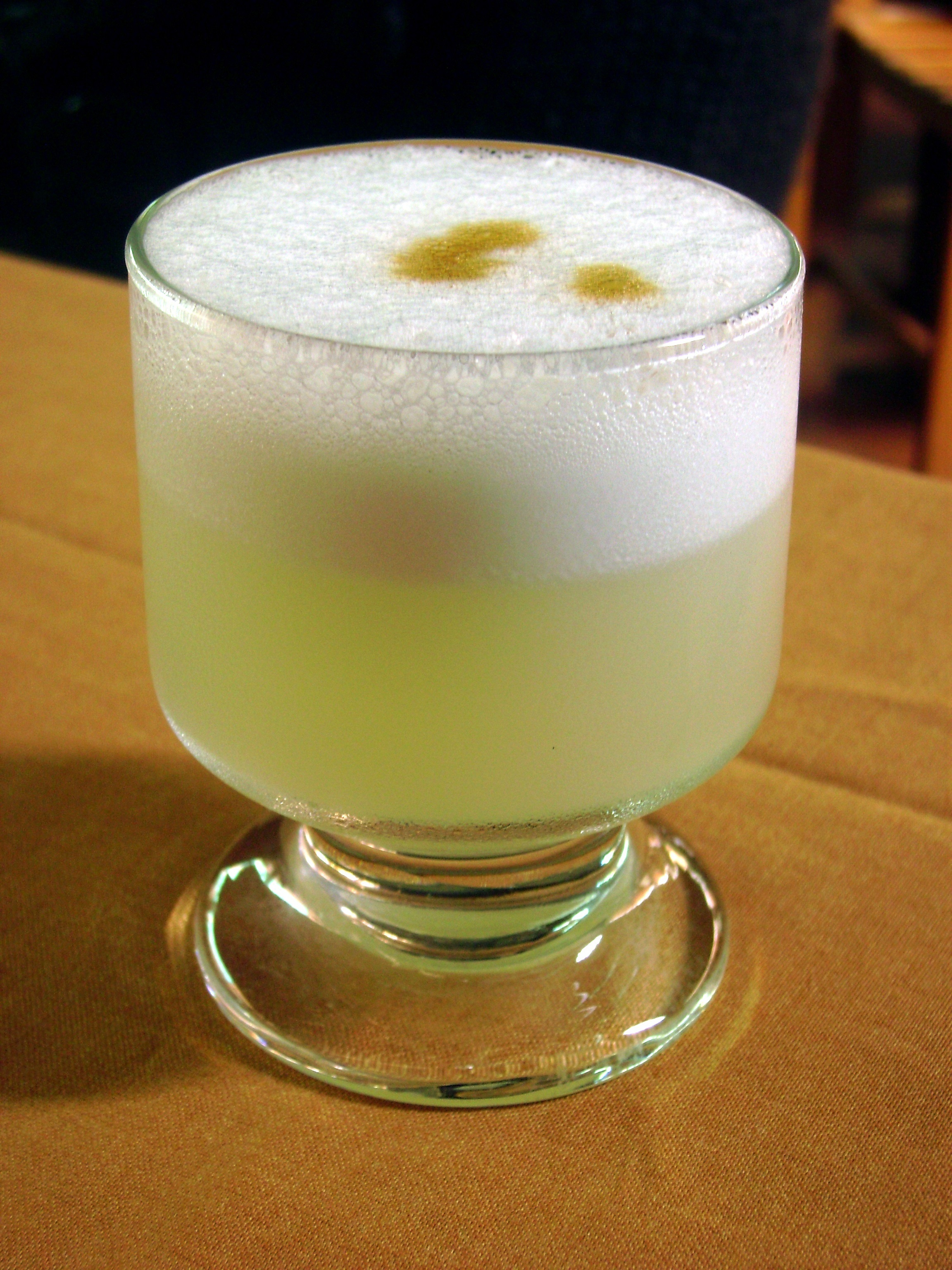
A pisco sour

=== Bitters ===
- AmericanoIBA
- BoulevardierIBA
- Brut cocktail
- Fernet con cocaIBA
- Trinidad sourIBA

=== Korn ===
- Schneemaß

=== Ouzo ===
- Ouzini

=== Pisco ===
- Aguaymanto sour
- Mango sour
- Piscola
- Pisco sourIBA

=== Schnapps ===
- Appletini
- Fuzzy navel
- Redheaded slut
- Sex on the beachIBA

== Other ==
- Cutty bang
- Jello shot
- Karsk
- Nutcracker
- Tamango

== Historical classes of cocktails ==
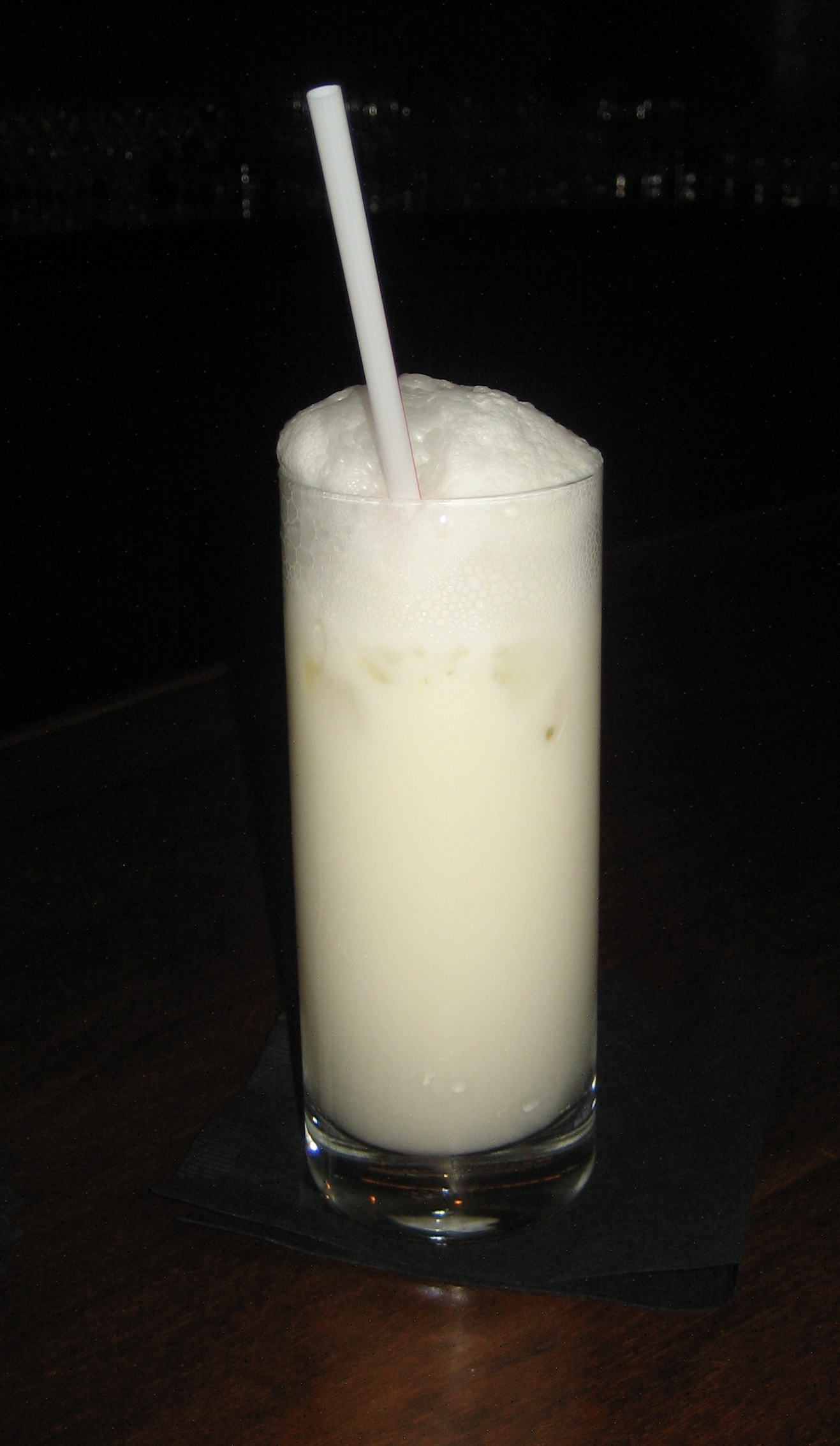
A Ramos gin fizz

- Cobbler – traditional long drink that is characterized by a glass 3/4 filled with crushed or shaved ice that is formed into a centered cone, topped by slices of fruit
- Collins – traditional long drink stirred with ice in the same glass it is served in and diluted with club soda, e.g. Tom Collins
- Crusta – characterized by a sugar rim on the glass, spirit (brandy being the most common), maraschino liqueur, aromatic bitters, lemon juice, curaçao, with an entire lemon rind as garnish

- Daisy – traditional long drink consisting of a base spirit, citrus juice, sugar, and a modifier, typically a liqueur or grenadine. The most common daisy cocktail is the Brandy Daisy. Other commonly known daisies are the Whiskey Daisy, Bourbon Daisy, Gin Daisy, Rum Daisy, Lemon Daisy (the non-alcoholic variant), Portuguese Daisy (port and brandy), vodka daisy, and Champagne daisy. The Margarita and Sidecar (cocktail) are both variants of the Daisy; both use the simplest form of the specification (base spirit, citrus juice, and liqueur) with triple sec as the modifier; the former uses tequila as the base spirit and lime juice, while the latter uses brandy as the base spirit and lemon juice.
- Fix – traditional long drink related to Cobblers, but mixed in a shaker and served over crushed ice
- Fizz – traditional long drink including acidic juices and club soda, e.g. gin fizz
- Flip – traditional half-long drink that is characterized by inclusion of sugar and egg yolk
- Julep – base spirit, sugar, and mint over ice. The most common is the mint julep. Other variations include gin julep, whiskey julep, pineapple julep, and Georgia mint julep.
- Mizuwari – a mixture of a distilled spirit, such as whisky, diluted with water and ice
- Negus – wine (often port wine), mixed with hot water, oranges or lemons, spices, and sugar
- Punch – wide assortment of drinks, generally containing fruit or fruit juice; see also punsch
- Rickey – highball made from usually gin or bourbon, lime, and carbonated water
- Sangria – red wine and chopped fruit, often with other ingredients such as orange juice or brandy
- Shrub – one of two different types of drink – a fruit liqueur typically made with rum or brandy mixed with sugar and the juice or rinds of citrus fruit, or a vinegared syrup with spirits, water, or carbonated water
- Sling – traditional long drink prepared by stirring ingredients over ice in the glass and filling up with juice or club soda
- Smoking bishop – type of mulled wine, punch or wassail
- Sour – mixed drink consisting of a base liquor, lemon or lime juice, and a sweetener
- Toddy – mix of liquor and water with honey or sugar and herbs and spices, served hot

== By mixer ==
=== Strawberry ===
Strawberries can be muddled or puréed and added to many drinks, and they are liquor-friendly, being compatible with, e.g., bourbon whiskey, Cointreau, vodka, tequila, rum, and Champagne, among other spirits and liqueurs and so on.

Some recipes call for a strawberry syrup that can be made using strawberries, vanilla extract, sugar, and water. Some strawberry cocktail recipes do not call for a syrup, but rely on puréed strawberries to play that part.

Strawberries are often mixed with basil. Strawberry is popular in smashes since after the beverage has been drunk, the alcohol-infused strawberries can be consumed as well.

- Champagne bowler (Cognac, white wine, sparkling wine, simple syrup, strawberries)
- Cherub's cup (vodka, St. Germain elderflower liqueur, brut rosé sparkling wine, lemon juice, simple syrup, strawberry)
- Christmas Jones (vodka, sugar, pineapple juice, lemon-lime soda, strawberries)
- Fresh strawberry and lime Tom Collins (gin, lime juice, club soda, agave, strawberries)
- Kentucky kiss (Maker's Mark bourbon, lemon juice, maple syrup, club soda, strawberries)
- Strawberry beer margarita (tequila, Corona beer, limeade concentrate, lemon lime soda, strawberries)
- Strawberry berryoska (Russian standard vodka, lemonade, strawberries)
- Strawberry gin and tonic (gin, lime juice, orange bitters, tonic water, strawberry syrup)
- Strawberry gin smash (gin, strawberries, sugar, lime juice, elderflower liquor, club soda, mint sprigs)
- Strawberry mint sparkling limeade (Champagne, mint leaves, lime juice, honey)
- Strawberry pom mojito (white rum, mint leaves, lime juice, pomegranate juice, club soda or lime soda, strawberries)
- Strawberry rose gin fizz (gin, sugar, rose water, salt, club soda, strawberries)
- Strawberry smash (vodka, basil leaves, lemon juice, honey, club soda, strawberries)
- Strawberry whiskey lemonade (whiskey, lemon juice, strawberry syrup)
- Strawberry Mango Bourbon Smash (bourbon, strawberries, mango juice, lime juice, sugar syrup, ginger beer)

=== Carrot juice ===
Carrot juice can be mixed with spirits such as agave spirits, whiskey, tequila, gin, or mezcal. Vodka is sometimes chosen because its neutral taste allows more of the carrot juice taste to shine through. Carrot juice can also be mixed with liqueurs such as amaro. ginger, orange, lemon and honey can be other ingredients in carrot juice cocktails. Turmeric infusions are also common. Examples of drinks made with carrot juice include:

- 24 Carrot Gold Punch (gin, carrot juice, pineapple juice, lemon juice, ginger beer, pineapple slices, edible flowers)
- Jessica Rabbit (Big Gin, carrot juice, yellow Chartreuse, kümmel, lime juice, lime oleo saccharum, carrot top oil, arugula flower)

=== Pineapple juice ===
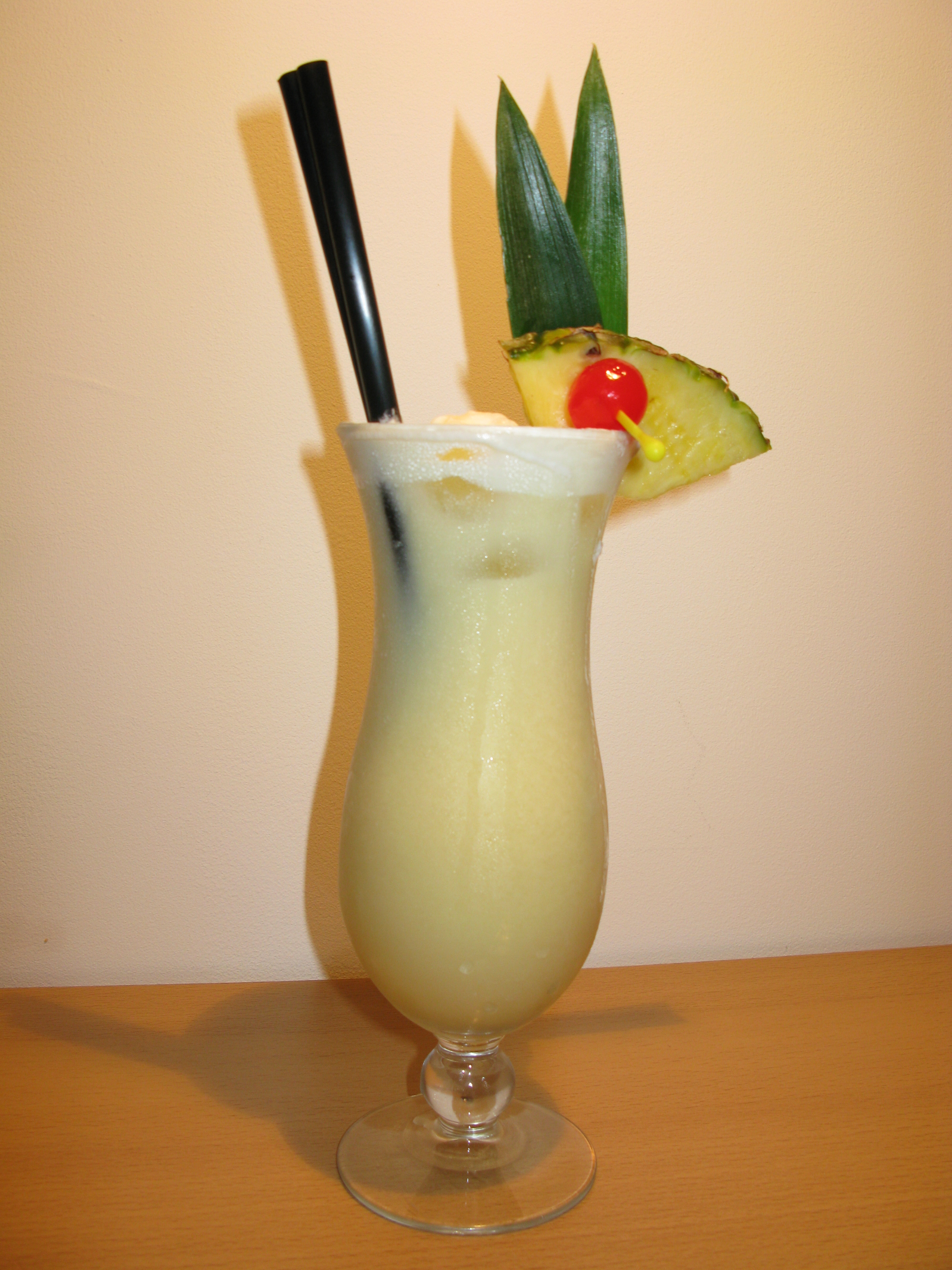
A piña colada

- Chuck Yeager (named after American Air Force Pilot Chuck Yeager. Includes pineapple juice and Jägermeister)
- Electric shark (rum, blue curaçao, pineapple juice, ginger beer)
- Jungle Bird (dark rum, campari, simple syrup, pineapple juice, lime juice)
- Piña coladaIBA (light rum, pineapple juice, cream of coconut)
- Shark bite (coconut rum, pineapple juice, blue curaçao)
- Torpedo Juice (ethyl alcohol and pineapple juice)
- Wiki wiki (rum, mango brandy, lime juice, pineapple juice, cane syrup, kiwi)
- Yaka hula hickey dula (dark rum, dry vermouth, pineapple juice)

=== Smashed fruit ===
A smash is a casual icy julep (spirits, sugar, and herb) cocktail filled with hunks of fresh fruit, so that after the liquid part of the drink has been consumed, one can also eat the alcohol-infused fruit (e.g. strawberries). The history of smashes goes back at least as far as the 1862 book How to Mix Drinks. The old-style whiskey smash was an example of an early smash.

The herb used in a smash is often mint, although basil is sometimes used in cocktails that go well with it, e.g. many strawberry cocktails. The name "smash" comes from the idea that on a hot day, one takes whatever fruit is on hand and smashes it all together to make a refreshing beverage. Generally a smash will have crushed ice.

- Apple bourbon smash (bourbon, honeycrisp apple, honey, lemon, nutmeg, cardamom)
- Blueberry smash (vodka, St. Germain elderflower liqueur, lemon rounds, lime rounds, blueberries, mint leaves)
- Bourbon blackberry smash (bourbon, lime juice, mint leaves, blackberries, simple syrup, club soda)
- Bourbon peach smash (bourbon, brown sugar simple syrup, peach, mint leaves, ginger beer or seltzer)
- Bourbon strawberry smash (bourbon, strawberries, simple syrup, lemon juice, mint leaves, club soda)
- Cranberry smash (vodka or bourbon, cranberries, mint leaves, lime, brown sugar, ginger ale)
- Grapefruit smash (cachaça, ruby red grapefruit, simple syrup, mint)
- Kiwi smash (gin, basil leaves, kiwifruit, honey syrup, lemon juice)
- Pear bourbon smash (bourbon, maple syrup, water, pear, mint leaves, lemon juice)
- Pineapple smash (spiced rum, pineapple rum, pineapple rings, lime juice, soda water)
- Raspberry smash (Champagne, vodka, lime wedges, sugar, raspberries)
- Watermelon smash (Vodka, watermelon juice, lemon juice, simple syrup, mint leaves)

=== Lemonade ===
A number of hard lemonades, such as Lynchburg lemonade (whose alcoholic ingredient is Jack Daniel's Tennessee whiskey) have been marketed. This section includes drinks that have the ingredients of lemonade (lemon juice and sugar).

- Boozy frozen lemonade (limoncello, lemon vodka, or lemon liqueur; lemon; sugar; lemonade)
- Boozy lemonade sorbet (vodka, lemon sorbet, lemonade)
- Fireball lemonade (Fireball cinnamon whisky, grenadine, lemonade)
- Fresh raspberry vodka lemonade (vodka, raspberries, sugar, lemonade)
- Gin fizz (gin, lemon juice, simple syrup, soda water)
- John Collins (gin, lemon juice, simple syrup, soda water)
- John Daly (vodka, sweet iced tea, lemonade)
- Lemonade margarita (tequila blanco, Cointreau, and either frozen lemonade from concentrate or a naturally sweetened lemonade made of lemon juice, maple syrup or agave, and water)
- Lemonade rum punch (coconut rum, dark rum, pineapple juice, lemonade)
- Long Island iced teaIBA (vodka, tequila, gin, light rum, orange-flavored liqueur, simple syrup, lemon juice, cola carbonated beverage)
- Moscato lemonade (vodka, pink moscato, strawberry lemonade)
- Pink lemonade vodka punch (vodka, lemon-lime soda or club soda, raspberries, lemon, pink lemonade concentrate)
- Sangria lemonade (light rum, white wine, raspberries, orange, Granny Smith apple, lemonade)
- Sour apple smash (apple vodka, pineapple rum, apple pucker, lemonade)
- Spiked pineapple lemonade (vodka, pineapple, lemons or limes, mint, pineapple juice, lemonade)
- Strawberry lemonade margarita (tequila, triple sec, strawberries, limes, frozen lemonade)
- Vodka lemonade slush (vodka, frozen lemonade concentrate, lemon zest)
- Watermelon vodka slush (vodka or watermelon vodka, watermelon, honey or simple syrup, lemonade)

=== Lemon-lime soda ===
A lemon-lime soda cocktail is a cocktail made with lemon-lime soda such as Sprite.

- 7 and 7 (whisky and 7 Up)
- Citrus splash (vodka, Sprite, and grapefruit juice)
- Corbins Riptide crash (blueberry vodka, Gatorade Frost Riptide Rush, Sprite)
- Mediterranean sunset (vodka, blood orange liqueur, Sprite, grenadine)
- Mexican martini (tequila, Cointreau, orange juice, lime juice, green olive brine, Sprite)
- Midori sour (melon liqueur, lime juice, lemon-lime soda)
- Orange Crush (vodka, orange liqueur, navel orange, lemon-lime soda)
- Pimm's cocktail (Pimm's No. 1, lemon, ginger ale, cucumber, ice cubes, lemonade)
- Pink lemonade vodka punch (vodka, raspberries, lemon, pink lemonade concentrate, lemon-lime soda)
- Pink lemonade vodka slush (vodka, frozen pink lemonade concentrate, soda water, lemon-lime soda)
- Whiskey Sprite lime cocktail (Irish whiskey, Sprite, soda water, lime wedge)

=== Apple juice ===
Hard cider has been produced by a number of companies, e.g. Woodchuck Hard Cider. Apple-flavored malt beverage products have also been sold by companies like Redd's Apple Ale, but these do not actually contain fermented apple juice.

- Apple chai gin and tonic (dry gin, apple chai syrup, tonic)
- Appletini (vodka, Calvados, lemon juice, simple syrup, and Granny Smith apple juice)
- Boozy apple cider slushie (bourbon, brown-sugar cinnamon simple syrup, lemon juice, dry hard cider, apple cider or juice)
- Boozy cider slushie (bourbon, ginger beer, chai tea, lemon juice, apple cider)
- Bourbon cider slushie (bourbon, cinnamon vanilla syrup, lemon juice, apple cider)
- Hard apple cider slushie (Fireball whiskey, cinnamon or crushed Red Hots, hard apple cider)

=== Grape juice ===
- Boozy Concord-grape ice pops (gin, juniper berries, sugar, lime juice, Concord grape juice)
- Early morning piece (Jack Daniel's whiskey, orange juice, grape juice)
- Enzoni cocktail (gin, campari, lemon juice, simple syrup, fresh grapes)
- Episcopal punch (vodka, ginger ale, white sparkling grape juice)
- Frosty grape fizz (gin or vodka, orange liqueur, soda water, purple grape juice)
- Grape ape/bling bling (vodka, lemon-lime soda, grape juice)
- Grape fizz (Seagram's grape twisted gin, ginger ale, white grape juice)
- Grape quencher (vodka, triple sec, lime juice, grape juice)
- Grape rocket (whiskey, vodka, grape juice)
- Henry Joose (Bombay Sapphire gin, Seagram's Extra Dry gin, 7-up, cranapple juice, grape juice)
- Jeweler's hammer (vodka, soda water, grape juice)
- John Rocker (vodka, peach schnapps, white grape juice)
- Mardi grape (grape vodka, grapefruit juice, club soda, grape juice)
- Mardi Gras madness (vodka, pineapple juice, lemon-lime soda, grape juice)
- Purple rain (Greenbar Tru Lemon Vodka, Licor, lemon juice, grape juice)

=== Orange juice ===
- Blood and Sand
- Bronx (gin, sweet red vermouth, dry vermouth, orange juice)
- Fuzzy navel (peach schnapps, orange juice)
- Harvey Wallbanger (vodka, galliano, orange juice)
- MimosaIBA (champagne, orange juice)
- Orange tundra (vodka, cream soda, coffee liqueur, orange juice)
- Screwdriver (vodka, orange juice)
- Sex on the beachIBA (vodka, peach schnapps, orange juice, cranberry juice)
- Ward 8 (rye whiskey, lemon juice, orange juice, grenadine)

=== Ginger soda ===
A ginger soda cocktail is a cocktail with ginger ale or ginger beer. Small Town Brewery produced the 5.90% ABV Not Your Father's Ginger Ale. Coney Island Brewing Co. Henry's Hard Soda produced the 4.2% ABV Henry's Hard Ginger Ale. Others have included Crabbie's Original Alcoholic Ginger Beer (4.8 percent) and Spiced Orange Alcoholic Ginger Beer (4.8 percent), Fentimen's Alcoholic Ginger Beer (4 percent), and New City Ginger Beer (8 percent).

- Cider and stormy (apple cider, dark rum, ginger beer)
- Dark 'n' stormyIBA (rum and ginger beer)
- Desert healer (orange juice, gin, cherry brandy and ginger beer)
- Dirty Shirley (vodka, grenadine, and ginger ale)
- Ginger apple cooler (apple whiskey, maple syrup, lemon juice, ginger beer)
- Ginger fizz (gin, alcoholic ginger beer, muddled limes and cilantro)
- Horse's neckIBA (brandy and ginger ale)
- Irish mule (Irish whiskey, ginger ale, lime juice)
- Moscow muleIBA (vodka, ginger beer, lime juice)
- Presbyterian (scotch and ginger ale)
- Screwdriver mule (Smirnoff Ice Screwdriver and ginger beer)
- Stoli alibi (vodka, ginger simple syrup, lime juice)
- White wine ginger spritz (dry white wine, ginger beer, lime juice)

=== Cola ===
Some cola cocktails are made by the brewer; for example, McAles sells a "hard cola" that is a malt beverage with kola and other natural flavors and caramel color added. Jack Daniel's and Miller Brewing also introduced a hard cola, "Black Jack Cola". Henry's Hard Soda introduced a hard cherry cola.

- All American (bourbon, Southern Comfort, and Coke)
- Batanga (tequila and Coke)
- Cuba libreIBA (rum and coke)
- Dirty black Russian (vodka, coffee liqueur, and Coke)
- Whiskey and Coke
- Kalimotxo (red wine and Coke)
- Long Island iced teaIBA (tequila, vodka, light rum, triple sec, gin, and a dash of Coke)

=== Tonic ===
A tonic cocktail is a cocktail that contains tonic syrup or tonic water. Tonic water is usually combined with gin for a gin and tonic, or mixed with vodka. However, it can also be used in cocktails with cognac, cynar, Lillet Blanc or Lillet Rosé, rum, tequila, or white port.

- Albra (vodka, cynar, mint syrup, lemon juice, tonic water)
- Cucumber cooler (gin, cucumber juice, pineapple syrup, lime juice, tonic water)
- Gin and tonic
- Gunga din (gin, pineapple juice, lime juice, simple syrup, cardamom pods, tonic)
- Lavender blanc (Lillet blanc, Dolin blanc, lavender bitters, tonic water)
- Peach fever (tequila, Bénédictine, muddled peach, tonic syrup)
- Tequila and tonic (tequila, tonic water, lime juice)
- Vodka tonic (vodka, tonic water)
- Yellowjacket jubilee (gin, lavender cordial, ginger syrup, lemon juice, soda water)

== See also ==
- Beer
- Beer cocktails
- Cocktail garnishes
- Drink mixers
- Drinking game
- Drinkware
- Flaming drink
- Glassware
- Highball
- List of alcoholic drinks
- List of IBA official cocktails
- List of liqueurs
- List of national drinks
- List of national liquors
- List of vodkas
- List of whisky brands
- Mixed drink shooters and drink shots
- Mixed drinks
- Non-alcoholic mixed drinks
- Pineapple juice cocktail
- Vermouth cocktails
- Wine cocktails
