= Cognac Skënderbeu =

Albanian cognac

Konjak Skënderbeu
- Logo of Konjak Skënderbeu
- Type: Cognac
- Manufacturer: ADOL L.t.d
- Origin: Albania
- Introduced: 1967
- Proof (US): 80
- Variants: Cognac, Raki, Fërnet, Orange Punch

Cognac Skënderbeu is an Albanian cognac produced and degusted for the first time on September 1, 1967, by then government-owned Kantina Skënderbeu.

The alcohol is prepared and aged only in vats, tuns and barrels made by oak wood, which gives it a unique aroma, bouquet and special colour. Its main ingredients are: aged raki, mountain plants extract, processed fruit (grapes, lemon, black plum), ethyl alcohol, sugar syrup, flower honey, distilled water, caramel, etc.

== See also ==
- Cocktails made with cognac or brandy
