= Hoppel poppel (drink) =

Alcoholic beverage

Hoppel poppel is an alcoholic beverage, associated with the Netherlands, made with egg yolks, milk, cognac or rum, sugar, nutmeg and vanilla.

Hoppel poppel can be served cold or hot.

== See also ==
- Kogel mogel
- Zabaione
- List of cocktails
