= Bourbon lancer =

Cocktail mixing Bourbon whiskey with Champagne

- Type: Cocktail
- Ingredients: 9 parts Bourbon; 16 parts Champagne; 3 dashes Angostura bitters
- Standard drinkware: Highball glass
- Standard garnish: Lemon peel
- Served: On the rocks: poured over ice
- Preparation: Build over ice; stir. Garnish with twist of lemon peel.

The bourbon lancer is a type of cocktail made by mixing bourbon whiskey with Champagne. These are mixed with bitters and served on the rocks.

== See also ==
- List of cocktails
