= Colombia (cocktail) =

Cocktail containing vodka and curaçao

- Type: Cocktail
- Ingredients: 2 parts vodka or brandy; 1 part blue Curaçao; 1 part grenadine; 1 part lemon juice; 6 parts orange juice
- Standard drinkware: Highball glass
- Preparation: Shake the vodka and citrus juices in a mixer, then strain into the glass. Slide the grenadine down one side of the glass, where it will sink to the bottom. Slide the curacao down the other side, to lie between the vodka and grenadine, and serve before the layers have a chance to mix.

The Colombia is a cocktail containing vodka and curaçao. The layering effect takes advantage of the variation in density and temperature between the layers. The drink appears as stacked horizontal layers of yellow, blue and red, which matches the three colours of the Colombian flag.

== See also ==
- List of cocktails
