= Flirtini =

Cocktail containing vodka, champagne and pineapple juice

The flirtini is a cocktail containing vodka, champagne and pineapple juice. The flirtini is known for being seen on Sex and the City and The Mighty Boosh. In The Mighty Boosh, it contained a twist of lime, but no vodka.

== See also ==
- List of cocktails
