= Platinum blonde (cocktail) =

Cocktail

- Type: Mixed drink
- Ingredients: 1 oz vodka; 1/2 oz herbal liqueur (traditionally elderflower cordial); 1/2 oz grapefruit juice; 1/2 oz lemon juice; 1/2 oz Simple syrup
- Base spirit: Vodka
- Standard drinkware: Cocktail glass
- Standard garnish: rosemary sprig
- Served: chilled
- Preparation: Combine ingredients with ice in cocktail shaker; shake well, then strain into cocktail glass. Garnish with rosemary sprig.

The platinum blonde is an infused cocktail made from vodka, citrus and herbal liqueur. The cocktail has a citrus–herbal flavor profile, and is often flavored with rosemary and elderflower. It is similar to the classic cloister cocktail, which calls for gin and chartreuse.

== See also ==
- List of cocktails
