= Desert healer =

Bubbly cocktail

Desert Healer
- Type: Cocktail
- Ingredients: 1½ oz. orange juice; 1½ oz. gin; ¾ oz. cherry brandy
- Base spirit: Ginger beer
- Standard drinkware: Highball glass
- Served: Highball
- Preparation: Shake well, strain into large tumbler and fill balance with ginger beer.

The Desert Healer is a mixed drink made with fresh orange juice, gin, cherry brandy and ginger beer. The recipe appears in The Savoy Cocktail Book. The Art of Mixing (1932) recipe replaces the ginger beer with ginger ale.

The recipe dates to the mid-1920s, being invented after Harry MacElhone, the owner of Harry's New York Bar, in Paris, France, complained to two guests that he was running out of recipes to include in a cocktail book he was writing. The two guests—Sir Rupert Stanley Harrington Grayson and F. Scott Fitzgerald—took it upon themselves to invent a drink for him, there, on the spot. A long evening of drunken experimentation by the two inventors resulted in a drink they christened the “Desert Healer.”

Much to their surprise, MacElhone published their recipe in his 1927 book, Barflies and Cocktails, attributing the drink to Sir Rupert Stanley Harrington Grayson alone. The original recipe given in the book was, “Juice of 1 Orange, 1 glass of Gin, ½ glass of Cherry Brandy Fockhink. Shake well, strain into large tumbler and fill balance with Ginger Beer.”
