= Hennchata =

The Hennchata is a cocktail consisting of Hennessy cognac and Mexican rice horchata agua fresca. It was invented in 2013 by Jorge Sánchez at his Chaco's Mexican restaurant in San Jose, California.

== Recipe ==
The Hennchata consists of 4 oz horchata plus a 1.5-oz (50 ml) bottle of Hennessy V.S. Jorge Sánchez, the originator, serves it with a straw in a thick-walled, stemmed chavela glass with the bottle of cognac inverted in a plastic holder clipped to the rim; the brandy bottle empties itself as the level of horchata falls, making the drink more alcoholic as it is consumed.

== Origin ==
The drink was created by Jorge Sánchez of Gilroy, after he took over Chaco's Mexican restaurant in downtown San Jose. Since its launch in February 2013, an average of 85 a day have been sold, more than 17,000 in a year, and the restaurant has become the largest seller of Hennessy bottles in Northern California. LVMH executives have visited and invited Sanchez to red-carpet events.

== See also ==
- List of cocktails
