= Red Russian (cocktail) =

Vodka-based cocktail

- Type: Cocktail
- Ingredients: 1 part (1 oz, 3 cl) vodka; 1 part (1 oz, 3 cl) Cherry Heering
- Base spirit: Vodka
- Standard drinkware: Rocks glass
- Served: On the rocks: poured over ice
- Preparation: Pour vodka, then Cherry Heering over ice.

A red Russian is usually made up of equal parts vodka and either cherry liqueur or strawberry schnapps and served with ice. It can also be prepared with cranberry juice or tomato juice.

== See also ==
- List of cocktails
- White Russian (cocktail)
