= Angel face (cocktail) =

Cocktail

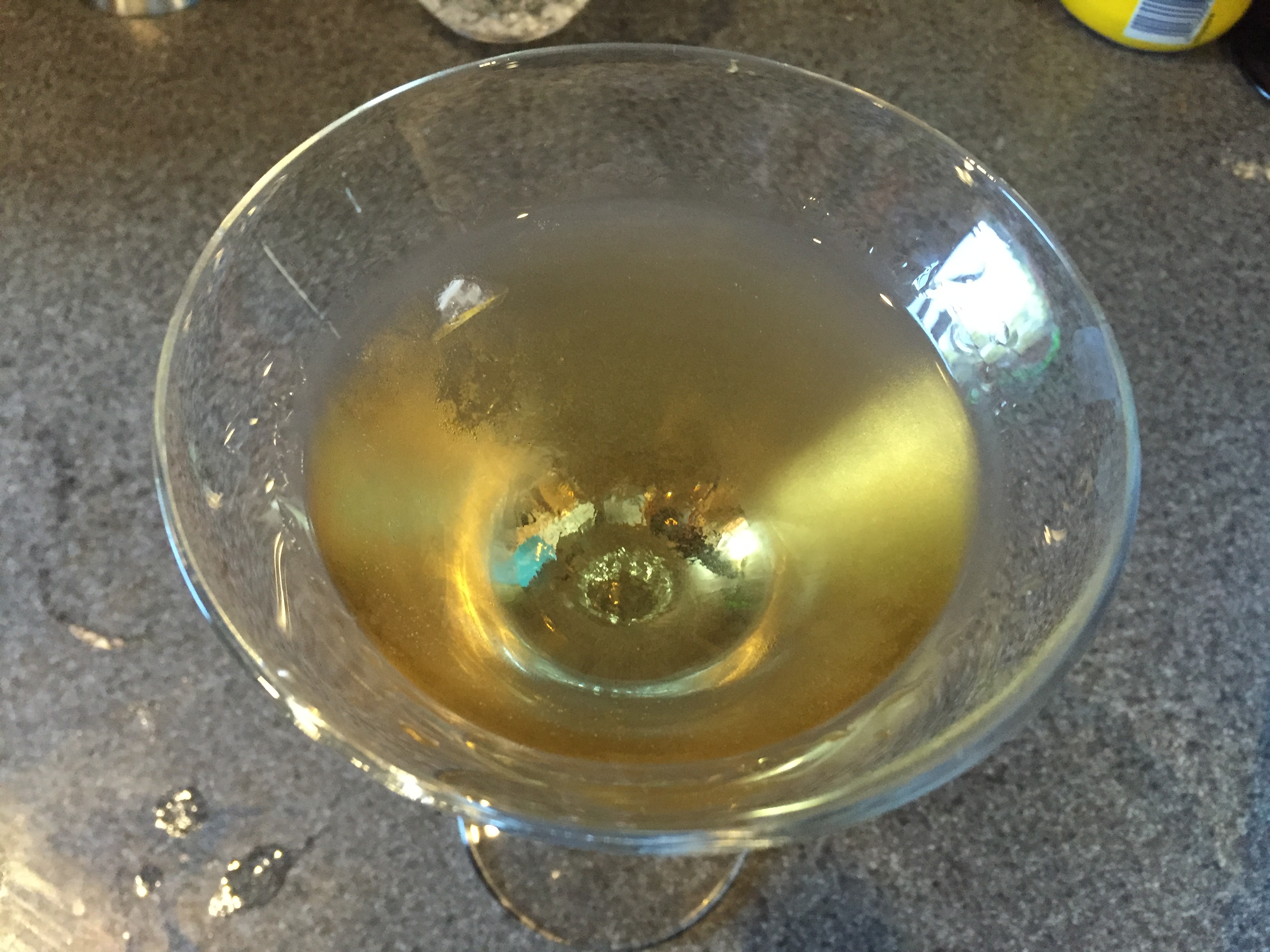
- Type: Cocktail
- Ingredients: 3 cl gin; 3 cl Apricot brandy; 3 cl Calvados
- Standard drinkware: Cocktail glass
- Served: Straight up: chilled, without ice
- Preparation: Pour all ingredients into cocktail shaker filled with ice cubes. Shake and strain into a chilled cocktail glass.

The angel face is a cocktail made from gin, apricot brandy and Calvados in equal amounts.

The cocktail first appears in the Savoy Cocktail Book compiled by Harry Craddock in 1930.

== See also ==
- List of cocktails
- List of IBA official cocktails
