= Venom (cocktail) =

Scottish alcoholic beverage

- Type: Cocktail
- Ingredients: Orange Juice, WKD Blue; Southern Comfort; Vodka
- Base spirit: Vodka, Rum
- Standard drinkware: Pint glass

A Venom is a cocktail made with Orange juice, WKD Blue, Southern Comfort, and vodka, and is typically served in a pint glass with ice. The drink is typically associated with Scotland and its nightlife scene.

== History ==
The drink was, supposedly, first created in 2008, by Glaswegian DJ and cocktail expert, Ross McGregor.

In 2018, controversial English energy drink company, Dragon Soop, announced that they were releasing a Venom flavour of their alcoholic energy drink.

== Preparation ==
The drink is typically prepared in a pint glass, mixing one part vodka, one part Southern Comfort, a bottle of WKD Blue, and Orange Juice, mixed together until the drink is a luminous green. Ice is optional.
