= Curaçao punch =

Cocktail

Curaçao punch is a cocktail that comes from Harry Johnson's New and Improved Bartender's Manual (1882), though a drink of that name was served in the Metropolitan Hotel in Washington, D.C. at least as early as 1867. Dale DeGroff, a notable bartender and author of The Craft of the Cocktail (Clarkson Potter, 2002), holds this to be his favorite forgotten potation.

== Preparation ==
Preparation involves combining the sugar, lemon juice, and soda water, dissolving the sugar, pouring the drink into a glass with finely-shaved or crushed ice and then adding the remaining ingredients. The drink is then stirred and may be garnished with a variety of fruits.

- 1/2 tablespoon (7 ml) sugar

(This indulged the major nineteenth-century sweet tooth-alter to taste.)

- 2 or 3 dashes fresh lemon juice

(More of this can also compensate for the sweetness.)

- 1 ounce (1/4 gill, 3 cl) soda water
- 1 ounce (1/4 gill, 3 cl) brandy (Johnson calls for Martell cognac.)
- 2 ounce (1/2 gill, 6 cl) orange curaçao
- 1 ounce (1/4 gill, 3 cl) Jamaican rum

(Dale suggests a full-bodied style of rum.)

== See also ==
- List of cocktails
