= Ochsenblut =

Ochsenblut (ox blood) is a champagne and burgundy cocktail from Königsberg. It was mixed at the no longer existent Blutgericht pub.

The name "Ochsenblut" came from both the deep red colour of the drink, reminiscent of the colour oxblood, and the name of the Blutgericht pub ("blood court" – the pub being located under the regional court in Königsberg Castle) where it was served.

== Literature ==
- Robert Albinus: Königsberg-Lexikon. Stadt und Umgebung. Special edition. Flechsig, Würzburg 2002, ISBN 3-88189-441-1.
- Jürgen Manthey: Königsberg. Geschichte einer Weltbürgerrepublik. Hanser, Wien et al. 2005, ISBN 3-446-20619-1.
- Gunnar Strunz: Königsberg entdecken. Unterwegs zwischen Memel und Haff. Trescher, Berlin 2006, ISBN 3-89794-071-X (Trescher-Reihe Reisen).

== See also ==
- List of cocktails
