= Blueberry tea =

Cocktail made from tea and liqueurs

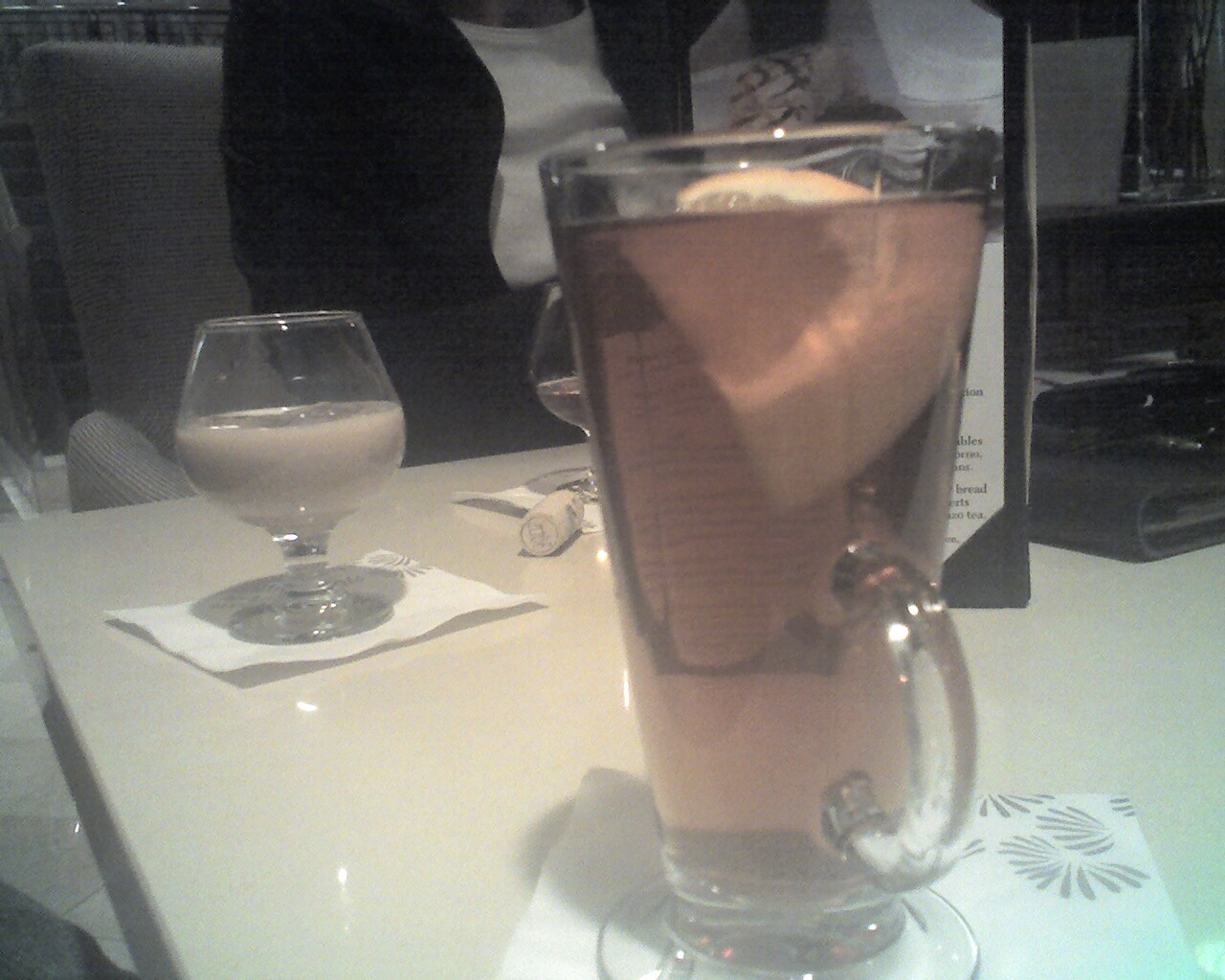
Blueberry tea

The blueberry tea is a cocktail made from tea and liqueurs. It is served hot and could be considered a variant on the hot toddy. Its name derives from its fruity taste, which some compare to blueberries.

== Preparation ==
A blueberry tea is usually served in a brandy snifter, to concentrate and hold the alcohol fumes released by the tea's heat. Ingredients are typically

- 1 oz. Grand Marnier liqueur
- 1 oz. Amaretto liqueur
- Hot Orange pekoe tea to taste.

Preparation is simple -- Add both liqueurs to the snifter and then fill with hot tea to taste. Swaddle the brandy snifter in serviettes or a cloth to protect the hands. Some suggest a sugared rim, or adding sugar to the tea, or a lemon garnish.

== Variations ==
- Made with Earl Grey tea instead of Orange pekoe.
- Made with actual blueberry fruit tea or other herbal tea, and less Grand Marnier
- Full moon #2, blueberry tea without the tea

== See also ==
- List of cocktails
- Hot toddy
