= Aigua de València =

Spanish cocktail with orange juice, champagne, vodka and gin

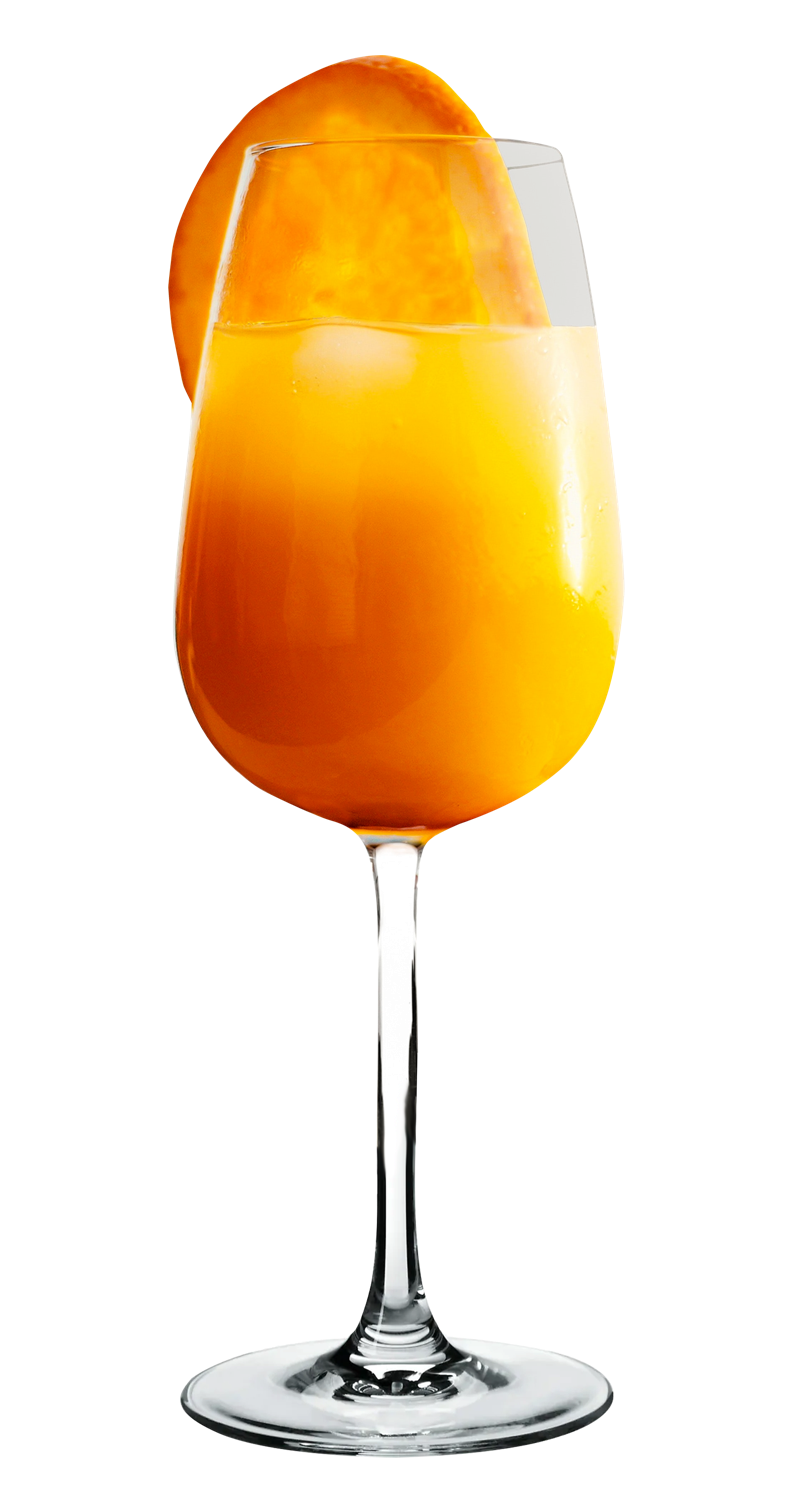
Agua de València

Valencian Water (Valencian: aigua de València) is a cocktail made from a base of cava or champagne, orange juice, vodka and gin. In general, it is served in pitchers of various sizes and is consumed from a broad cocktail glass. It was made for the first time in 1959 by Constante Gil in the bar Café Madrid de Valencia in the city of Valencia, Spain.

According to the writer María Ángeles Arazo in her book Valencia Noche, the bar was frequented at that time by a group of Basque travellers that used to order "Agua de Bilbao" (Spanish: "Water of Bilbao"), referring to the bar's best cava. Tired of always ordering the same thing, they challenged the owner to offer them something new and he suggested that they try the "Agua de Valencia". They agreed to try what Gil made, and liking it, they continued to drink it in later visits.

For a decade the drink was known only to a small group of clients and it was not until the 1970s that it started to become known in the wider Valencian nightlife. Since then, it has grown to be a very popular drink.

Constante Gil left the bar in 2000, and dedicated himself to painting "Tertulias de Café" (lit. '"social gatherings of the café"'), an homage to his experiences there. Gil died of a heart attack on 7 June 2009 in Valencia.

== See also ==
- List of cocktails
