= Death Flip =

Alcoholic cocktail

- Type: Cocktail
- Ingredients: 30 ml (1 part) Tequila; 15 ml (0.5 parts) Chartreuse; 15 ml (0.5 parts) Jägermeister; dash simple syrup; 1 whole egg
- Standard drinkware: Champagne coupe
- Standard garnish: grated nutmeg
- Served: Straight up: chilled, without ice
- Preparation: dry shake, shake with ice, fine strain and garnish with freshly grated nutmeg.

A Death Flip is a drink made from Tequila, Chartreuse, and Jägermeister and a whole egg. It was created in 2010 by Chris Hysted-Adams in Fitzroy, Victoria at the Black Pearl.
