= Boston (cocktail) =

- Type: Cocktail
- Ingredients: Gin; Apricot brandy; Grenadine; Lemon juice
- Standard drinkware: Cocktail glass
- Standard garnish: cherry
- Served: Straight up: chilled, without ice
- Preparation: Shaken over ice, strained into a chilled glass, garnished, and served straight up.

A Boston is a cocktail made with London dry gin, apricot brandy, grenadine, and the juice of a lemon.

== See also ==
- List of cocktails
