= Cooperstown cocktail (cocktail) =

Cooperstown Cocktail
- Ingredients: 1 oz. Gin; .5 oz. Dry vermouth; .5 oz. Sweet vermouth; Mint sprig
- Standard drinkware: Cocktail glass
- Served: Frozen: blended with ice
- Preparation: Shake with ice and strain into chilled cocktail glass, add mint.

A Cooperstown cocktail is a cocktail containing gin, dry vermouth, and sweet vermouth. It is shaken with ice and strained into a chilled cocktail glass with a sprig of mint added.

== History ==
The Cooperstown cocktail originated at the Waldorf bar around the turn of the 20th century. It was named in honor of Craig Wadsworth and his friends, who lived in Cooperstown, New York.

== See also ==
- List of cocktails
