= Derby (cocktail) =

Cocktail

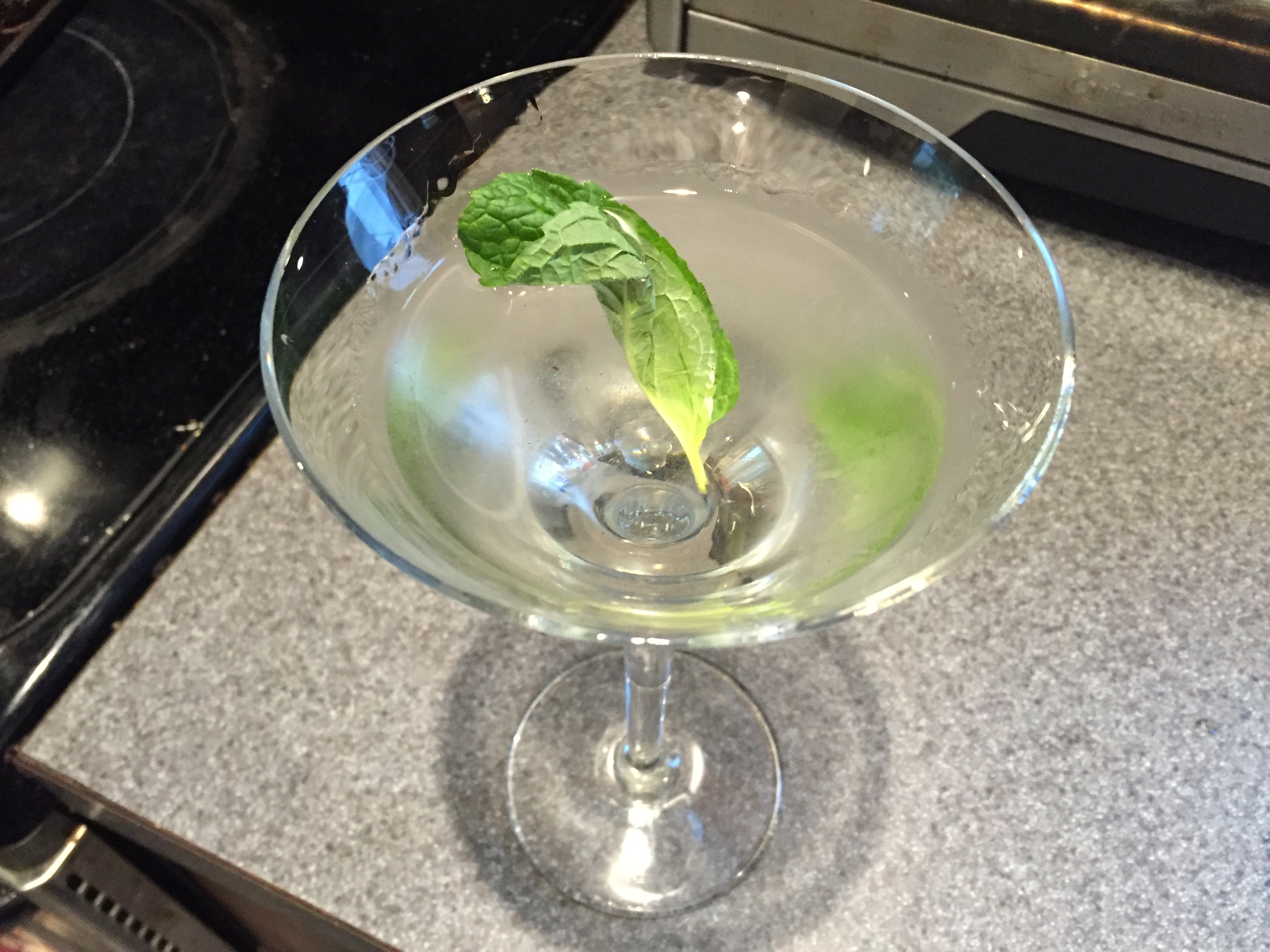
- Type: Cocktail
- Ingredients: 6 cl gin; 2 dashes peach bitters; 2 fresh mint leaves
- Base spirit: Gin
- Standard drinkware: Cocktail glass
- Standard garnish: mint leaves
- Served: Straight up: chilled, without ice
- Preparation: Pour all ingredients into a mixing glass with ice. Stir. Strain into a cocktail glass. Garnish with a sprig of fresh mint in the drink.

The derby is a cocktail composed of gin, peach bitters and mint leaves.

Other cocktails are known by the same name.

== See also ==
- List of cocktails
