= Agua de Sevilla =

Drink typically consumed in Seville, Spain

- Ingredients: pineapple juice; Cava; whiskey; cointreau (triplesec)
- Preparation: Recipes instruct to crush the ice until it is shaved and serve in champagne glasses with a leaf of hierba buena.

Agua de Sevilla is a drink typically consumed mostly in the region of Seville, Spain. It is considered "a mild and tasty typical drink" and can be found in numerous nightclubs in Seville.

== Preparation ==
Agua de Sevilla's preparation varies widely, but a fairly typical recipe is:

- pineapple juice or syrup
- cava
- Splash of whiskey
- Splash cointreau (triplesec)
- ice

Optional:

- heavy cream

Some recipes call for an additional splash of rum, and others substitute cognac for cointreau. Some also call for shaved ice.

Recipes instruct to crush the ice until it is shaved and serve in champagne glasses with a leaf of hierba buena.

== See also ==
- List of cocktails
