= Harlem mugger (cocktail) =

Alcoholic cocktail

A Harlem mugger is an alcoholic cocktail usually made with 1/2 oz vodka, 1/2 oz gin, 1/2 oz white rum, 1/2 oz tequila, and 3 oz Champagne, topped with cranberry juice. It is normally served straight up and garnished with a wedge of lime.
