= Fluffy duck =

Cocktail using of advocaat

Fluffy duck is the name of two different cocktails, both using advocaat as a common ingredient. One cocktail is a smooth, creamy drink based on white rum, and the other is a gin-based highball.

== Preparation ==
White rum-based Fluffy Duck	Gin-based Fluffy Duck
white rum (3 cl) advocaat (3 cl) heavy cream (1 cl)	gin (3 cl) advocaat (1 cl) dash of orange liqueur dash of orange juice soda
Pour rum and advocaat into a glass filled with ice and stir it. Float the cream on top and garnish the drink with a strawberry. Serve with a straw and a stir.	Fill a tall glass with ice and pour all ingredients into it but the soda and stir. Then float the soda on the top.
