= Glowtini =

The Glowtini is a cocktail inspired by the Year of a Million Dreams celebration at Walt Disney World Resort and some Disneyland Resort locations. The Glowtini is served at restaurants all over Disney World.

It consists of Skyy Citrus Vodka, Blue Curacao, peach schnapps, Sweet-N-Sour, and pineapple juice. It is garnished with a souvenir glow cube. The glow cube "ice cubes" are made of clear plastic and feature LEDs that flash and blink once a button is activated.

The Glowtini is the winner of the 2008 Cheers Awards for Beverage Excellence in the category of Best Chain Signature Drink. Winners are selected by a judging panel composed of leading beverage professionals and members of the Cheers Beverage Conference team.
