= Batanga (cocktail) =

Tequila cocktail

A batanga is a cocktail made with tequila, lime juice, and cola (e.g. Mexican Coke), typically served in a glass with a salted rim. It is like a Cuba Libre, except with tequila in place of rum. Credit for the invention of the drink is often given to Don Javier Delgado, owner of La Capilla in Tequila, Mexico, who was said to have invented it in 1961 after a particularly "rotund" customer. It is a fairly popular drink in Mexico. Supercall notes, "At La Capilla, the drink is stirred with a long, wood-handle knife that was previously used to chop up limes, ingredients for guacamole, chiles for salsa and countless other common kitchen ingredients" which slightly imparts those flavors to the drink.
