= Tamango (cocktail) =

Italian cocktail

The tamango is an Italian cocktail infused with roselle leaves and a variety of mysterious African roots and plants which purportedly give it a hallucinogenic effect; it is 70% alcohol and is the specialty of a pub close to the University of Turin. The name is taken from an 1829 short story (later made into a 1958 film) of a slave ship revolt by French author Prosper Mérimée.
