= Barbary coast (cocktail) =

Mixed drink

The Barbary Coast is a Prohibition-era cocktails made with Scotch whisky, gin, white crème de cacao and cream. Aside from being a Prohibition-era drink, its origins are unknown, though the Barbary Coast was a nine-block area in San Francisco that was a red-light district frequented by sailors in the mid-19th to early 20th centuries. It is shaken over ice and served in a chilled coupé glass garnished with freshly grated nutmeg. It appears in The Savoy Cocktail Book where it is served in a highball glass with cracked ice.
