= Mexican martini =

Cocktail variation of a Margarita cocktail

The Mexican martini is a cocktail variation of a Margarita served straight up in a cocktail glass like a Martini. It is a popular drink in Austin, Texas.

It is not a true martini, but is one of many drinks that incorporate the term martini into their names.

== Preparation ==
Recipes and preparation types vary. The primary ingredients are tequila and orange liqueur. Other flavoring ingredients like orange juice, lime juice, sparkling sodas and salt may be used. One common recipe is as follows:

- 2 US fl oz (60 ml) tequila
- 1 US fl oz (30 ml) Cointreau liqueur
- 1–2 oz. Sprite
- 1 oz. orange juice
- 1/2 lime, juice of
- 1/2 US fl oz (15 ml) green olive brine
- garnish with 2+ green olives

== History ==
There is contention as to the origin of Mexican martinis, as their history is unclear. However most Texans assert that it was the Cedar Door Patio Bar & Grill in Austin, Texas that first came up with the recipe.
