= Schneemaß =

Alcoholic mixed drink

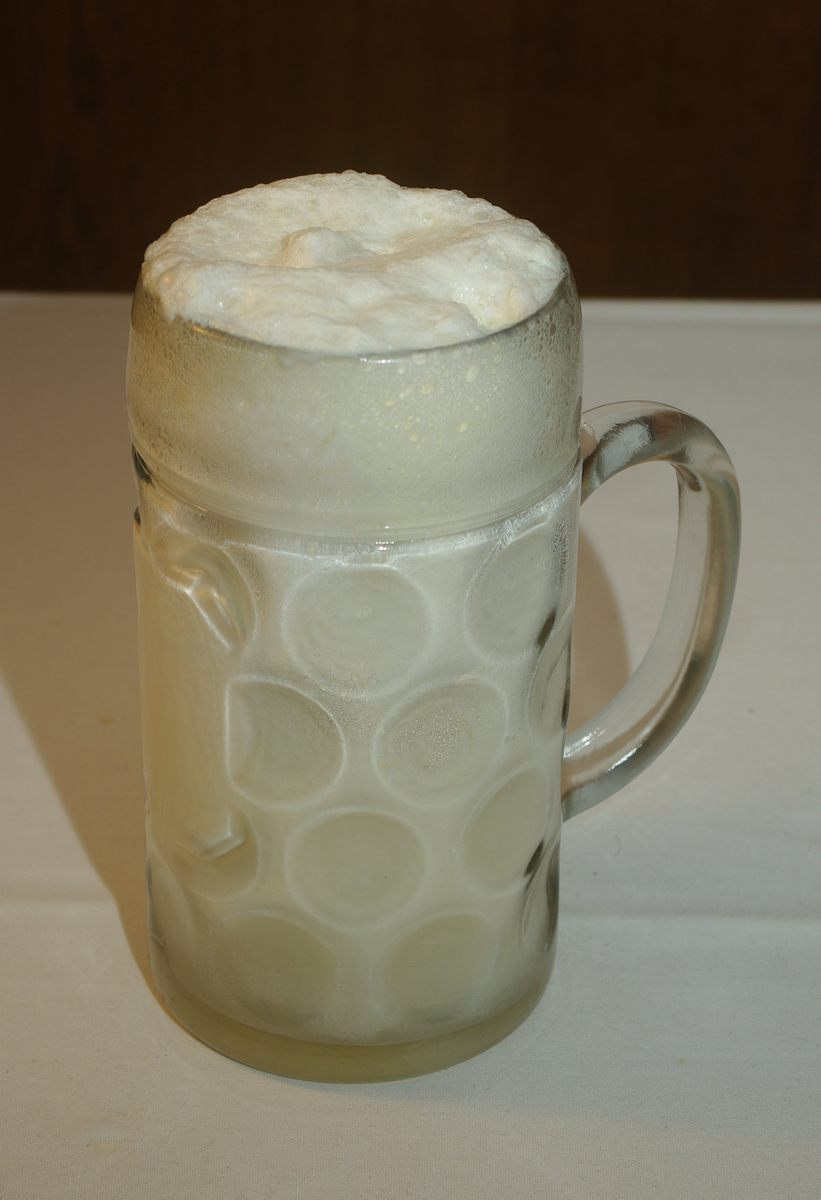
A Schneemaß

A Schneemaß is a German alcoholic mixed drink mixed and served in a Maß glass.

== Recipe ==
First a quarter of a litre of Korn (for example Doornkaat) is poured into a Maß. A rough estimate is to fill the Maß up to the upper edge of its first "ring". Four or five large scoops of vanilla ice cream are added to the liquor. Lemonade is added as a mixer and the drink is carefully stirred with a spoon until the ice cream has melted into the drink. The drink can also be mixed with a whisk or a mixer. The drink can be drunk directly from the Maß or through a drinking straw.

== Alternative recipes ==
There are various alternative recipes. A Schneemaß can also be mixed with vodka instead of Korn. A less common alternative is to replace part of the lemonade with Sekt or beer.

== Etymology ==
The name "Schneemaß" (German for "snow measure") comes from the creamy, light foam on top of the drink, consisting of ice cream and lemonade. Because of the sweet, fruity taste masking the significant alcohol content, the Schneemaß is a favoured drink among the youth in the Altbayern area, along with the Goaßmaß and the Laternmaß.
