= Brooklyn (cocktail) =

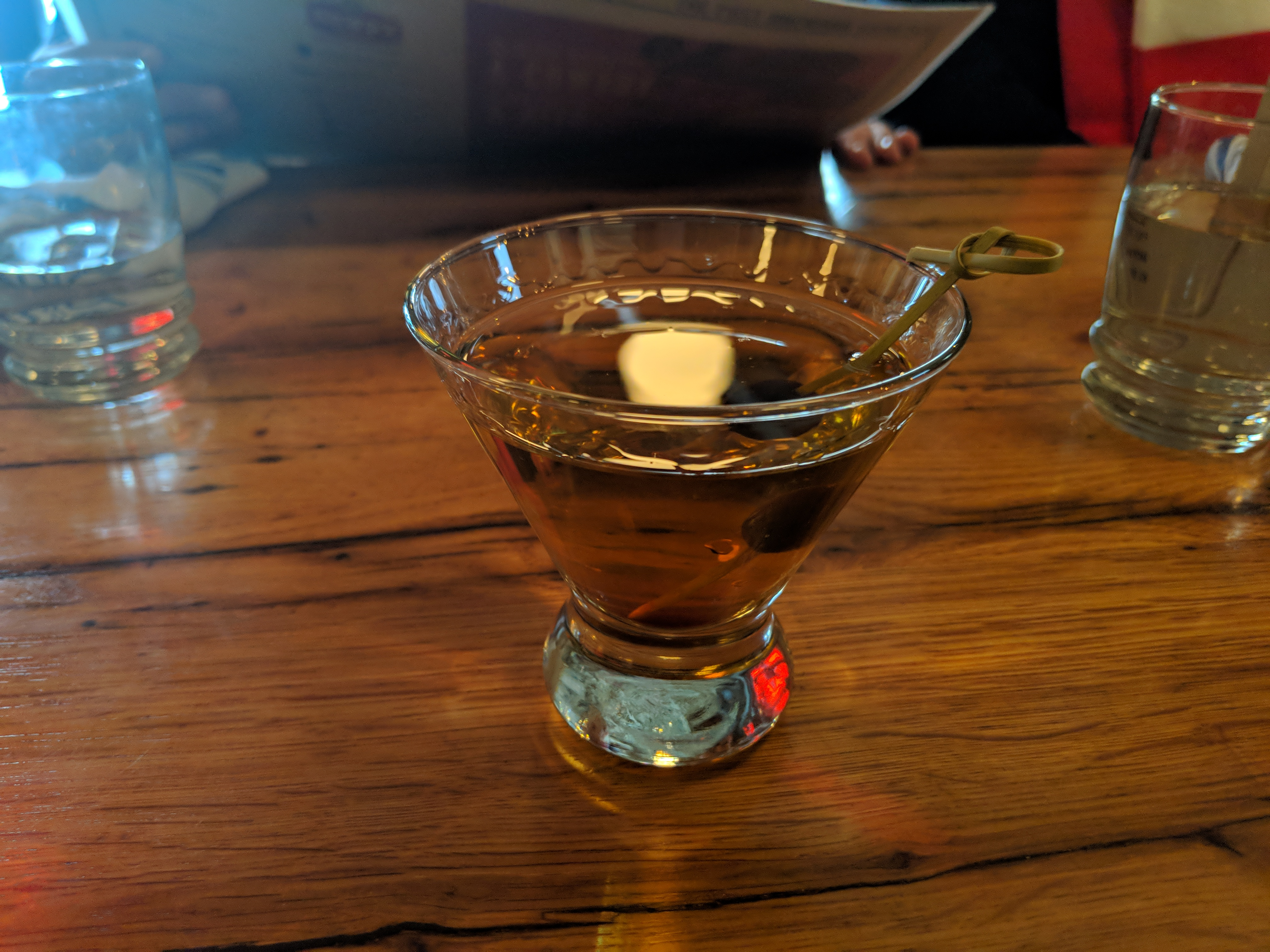
- Brooklyn cocktail
- Type: Cocktail
- Ingredients: 2 oz rye or Canadian whisky; 1 oz dry vermouth; 1/4 oz Maraschino liqueur; 1/4 oz Picon or a few dashes of Angostura bitters; Maraschino cherry (Garnish)
- Standard drinkware: Cocktail glass
- Standard garnish: cherry
- Served: Straight up: chilled, without ice
- Preparation: Stirred over ice, strained into a chilled glass, garnished, and served straight up.

The Brooklyn is one of five cocktails named for the boroughs of New York City, along with the Bronx, the Manhattan, the Queens and the Staten Island Ferry. It resembles a Manhattan, but with dry vermouth, Picon, and Maraschino. It largely fell into obscurity after the end of Prohibition, but experienced a resurgence in the 1990s.

The Brooklyn was originally invented by actor and playwright Maurice Hegeman in 1910 at the Schmidt Cafe near the Brooklyn side of the Brooklyn Bridge; although in a different version than what is now considered the standard version of a Brooklyn. Hegeman's Brooklyn included a mix of hard cider, absinthe, and ginger ale.

If Picon is unavailable, another bittersweet orange liqueur (such as Bigallet China-China) or several dashes of Angostura bitters may be used.

== See also ==
- List of cocktails
