= Brut cocktail =

Vermouth cocktail

The brut cocktail is an early cocktail that appears in William "Cocktail" Boothby's 1908 work The World's Drinks and How to Mix Them as "a la (strong cigar) Tom Walsh, Seattle, Wash. Into a small mixing-glass full of cracked ice place a few drops of Angostura bitters, two dashes of Orange bitters, one-third of a jigger of Picon and two-thirds of a jigger of French vermouth; stir briskly, strain into a cocktail glass, squeeze a piece of lemon peel over the top and don't forget to ring up the money."
