= Bronx (cocktail) =

Drink of gin, orange juice, and vermouth

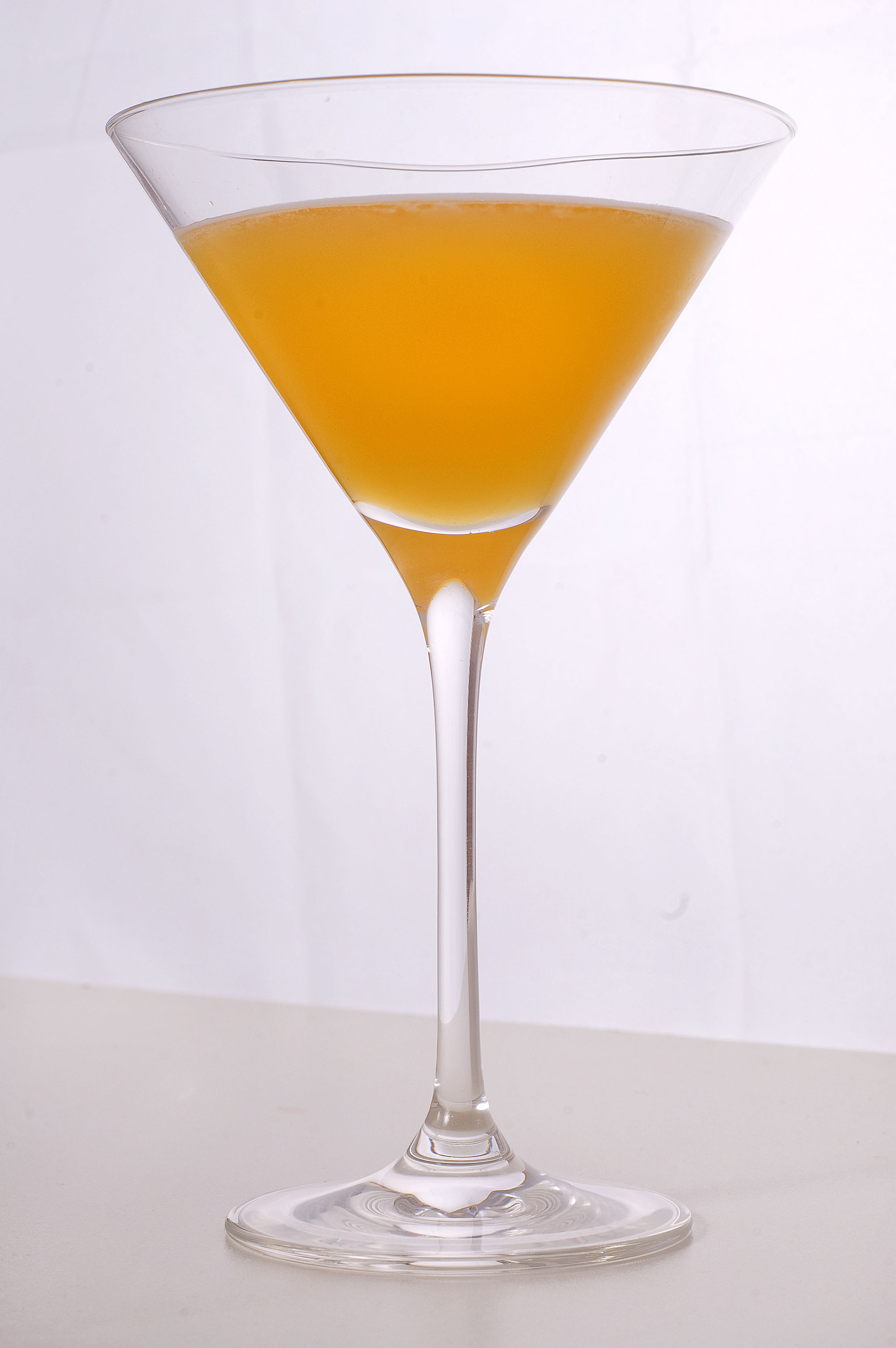
- Type: Cocktail
- Ingredients: 3 cl (6 parts) Gin; 1.5 cl (3 parts) Sweet Red Vermouth; 1 cl (2 parts) Dry Vermouth; 1.5 cl (3 parts) Orange juice
- Standard drinkware: Cocktail glass
- Standard garnish: orange twist
- Served: Straight up: chilled, without ice
- Preparation: Pour into cocktail shaker all ingredients with ice cubes, shake well. Strain in chilled cocktail or martini glass.

The Bronx is a cocktail. It is essentially a martini with orange juice added. It was ranked number three in "The World's 10 Most Famous Cocktails in 1934" behind the Martini (#1) and the Manhattan (#2). In the 1934 movie "The Thin Man", the lead actor (William Powell) compared the methods for shaking the Manhattan, the Bronx and the Martini.

== History ==
As with several mixed drinks invented prior to prohibition in the United States, more than one story is attributed to the creation of this cocktail.

=== Joseph S. Sormani ===
Two sources credit Joseph S. Sormani as the person responsible for the drink.

The Bronx Cocktail, strange to say, was invented in Philadelphia, of all places! There it might have remained in obscurity had it not been for one Joseph Sormani, a Bronx restaurateur, who discovered it in the Quaker City in 1905. The original recipe has been greatly distorted in the course of years, but here is the original to guide you and to compare with the other recipes being used: Four parts of gin, one part of orange juice and one part of Italian Vermouth. Shake thoroughly in ice and serve.

In Sormani's New York Times obituary, he was credited with creating the drink:

Joseph S. Sormani, retired Bronx restaurateur, who was said to have originated the Bronx cocktail, died Wednesday night in his home, 2322 Fish Avenue, the Bronx, after a brief illness. His age was 83.

=== Johnnie Solan ===
According to Albert Stevens Crockett, historian of the Waldorf-Astoria Hotel, the inventor of the Bronx cocktail was Johnnie Solan (or Solon). Solon, a pre-Prohibition bartender at the Manhattan hotel, was "popular as one of the best mixers behind its bar counter for most of the latter's history." This is Crockett's account of Solon's own story of the Creation of the Bronx:

We had a cocktail in those days called the Duplex, which had a pretty fair demand. One day, I was making one for a customer when in came Traverson, head waiter of the Empire Room—the main dining room in the original Waldorf. A Duplex was composed of equal parts of French and Italian Vermouth, shaken up with squeezed orange peel, or two dashes of Orange Bitters. Traverson said, 'Why don't you get up a new cocktail? I have a customer who says you can't do it.'

'Can't I?' I replied.

Well, I finished the Duplex I was making, and a thought came to me. I poured into a mixing glass the equivalent of two jiggers of Gordon Gin. Then I filled the jigger with orange juice, so that it made one-third of orange juice and two-thirds of Gin. Then into the mixture I put a dash each of Italian and French Vermouth, shaking the thing up. I didn't taste it myself, but I poured it into a cocktail glass and handed it to Traverson and said: 'You are a pretty good judge.' (He was.) 'See what you think of that.' Traverson tasted it. Then he swallowed it whole.

'By God!' he said, 'you've really got something new! That will make a big hit. Make me another and I will take it back to that customer in the dining room. Bet you'll sell a lot of them. Have you got plenty of oranges? If you haven't, you better stock up, because I'm going to sell a lot of those cocktails during lunch.'

The demand for Bronx cocktails started that day. Pretty soon we were using a whole case of oranges a day. And then several cases.

The name? No, it wasn't really named directly after the borough or the river so-called. I had been at the Bronx Zoo a day or two before, and I saw, of course, a lot of beasts I had never known. Customers used to tell me of the strange animals they saw after a lot of mixed drinks. So when Traverson said to me, as he started to take the drink in to the customer, 'What'll I tell him is the name of this drink?' I thought of those animals, and said: 'Oh, you can tell him it is a "Bronx".'

Solon would have created the cocktail sometime between 1899 (when he joined the establishment) and 1906 (when the word first appeared in print.) However, a prior reference to a "Bronx Cocktail" on a New York hotel menu indicates that either the name was already in use or Solon was not the original inventor.

=== Bill W.'s first remembered drink ===
Bill W., the founder of Alcoholics Anonymous, said that his first drink of alcohol that he could remember was the "Bronx cocktail", given to him by a "socialite" at a party during World War I. This was the beginning of his addiction to alcohol.

== Other early citations ==
It appears in William "Cocktail" Boothby's 1908 book The World's Drinks And How To Mix Them as "Bronx Cocktail, a la Billy Malloy, Pittsburgh, PA. One-third Plymouth gin, one-third French vermouth and one-third Italian vermouth, flavored with two dashes of Orange bitters, about a barspoonful of orange juice and a squeeze of orange peel. Serve very cold." Harry Craddock in The Savoy cocktail book mentions three recipes from the Bronx. The Bronx Cocktail is mentioned in the 1934 film "The Thin Man" by Nick Charles (played by William Powell). In the film, Nick Charles states that the Bronx should be shaken to 2-step time.

== Flavors ==
The Bronx is flavorful and mildly sweet "fruity" drink, without being uninteresting or sticky. Though possibly inspired by the Duplex, the two drinks are not really similar at all. Cocktail columnists Gary Regan and Mardee Haidin Regan describe it as a drink where "[g]in is the base ingredient, orange juice is the mixer, and sweet and dry vermouths are added almost as an afterthought."

== See also ==
- Bronx Zoo
- List of cocktails
