= Long vodka =

Vodka-based cocktail

- Type: Highball
- Ingredients: Vodka; Angostura bitters; Lemonade; Lime cordial
- Base spirit: Vodka
- Standard drinkware: Highball glass
- Served: On the rocks: poured over ice
- Preparation: Rinse glass of ice with Angostura bitters, add 1 or 2 shots of vodka and mix with lemonade and lime cordial.

A long vodka is a vodka-based cocktail, popular throughout Scotland and known to be served in some parts of England.

== Origins ==
The long vodka is claimed to have been invented in Lancashire, England in 1978 by Jacky Bevan. Bevan was a barmaid who, instead of making a gin gimlet as requested, accidentally made the drink with vodka instead of gin. She tried this combination and found it too bitter; she added lemonade to the drink and the first iteration of the drink was created. When Bevan visited a pub in Inverkeilor, Scotland in 1981 and requested the drink, the bartender was intrigued by her drink choice and added it to his cocktail menu. It is believed that shortly afterwards the drink became known in nearby Aberdeen and Montrose, and it quickly gained popularity around Scotland. The rinse of Angostura bitters and the name 'long vodka' were added sometime after this.

== Preparation ==
A long vodka is made by adding lemonade, or soda water, and lime cordial to 1 or 2 shots of vodka on ice. The glass can either be rinsed (and then emptied) with Angostura bitters, or 2–3 drops can be added to taste; distinguishing the drink from a vodka lime and lemonade.

== See also ==
- Gimlet (cocktail)
- Lemon, lime and bitters
- Pink Gin
