= Queens (cocktail) =

Type of cocktail

- Type: Cocktail
- Ingredients: 6 parts Gin; 3 parts Sweet Red Vermouth; 3 parts Dry Vermouth; 4 parts Pineapple juice
- Base spirit: Gin
- Standard drinkware: Cocktail glass
- Served: Straight up: chilled, without ice
- Preparation: Shake all ingredients in an ice-filled cocktail shaker. Strain into chilled martini or cocktail glass.

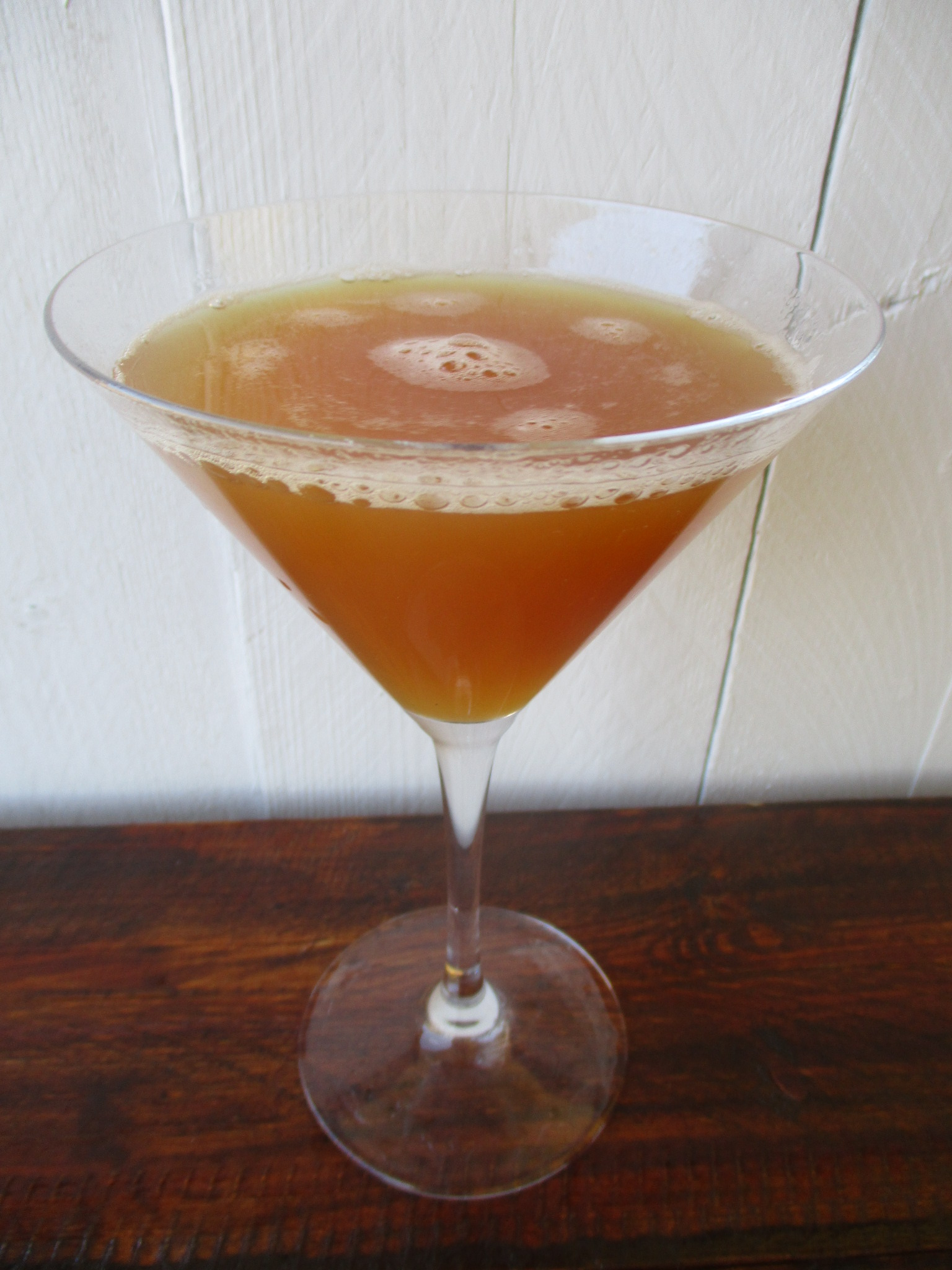
Queens (cocktail).

The Queens cocktail is a variant on the perfect martini, with the addition of pineapple juice and sometimes lemon juice. Its closest relative is the more popular Bronx, which contains orange juice rather than pineapple.

It can be found as early as 1930, in Harry Craddock's Savoy Cocktail Book; Craddock's text lists it as a "Queen's Cocktail".

== See also ==
- List of cocktails
