= Prince of Wales (cocktail) =

Cocktail created by King Edward VII

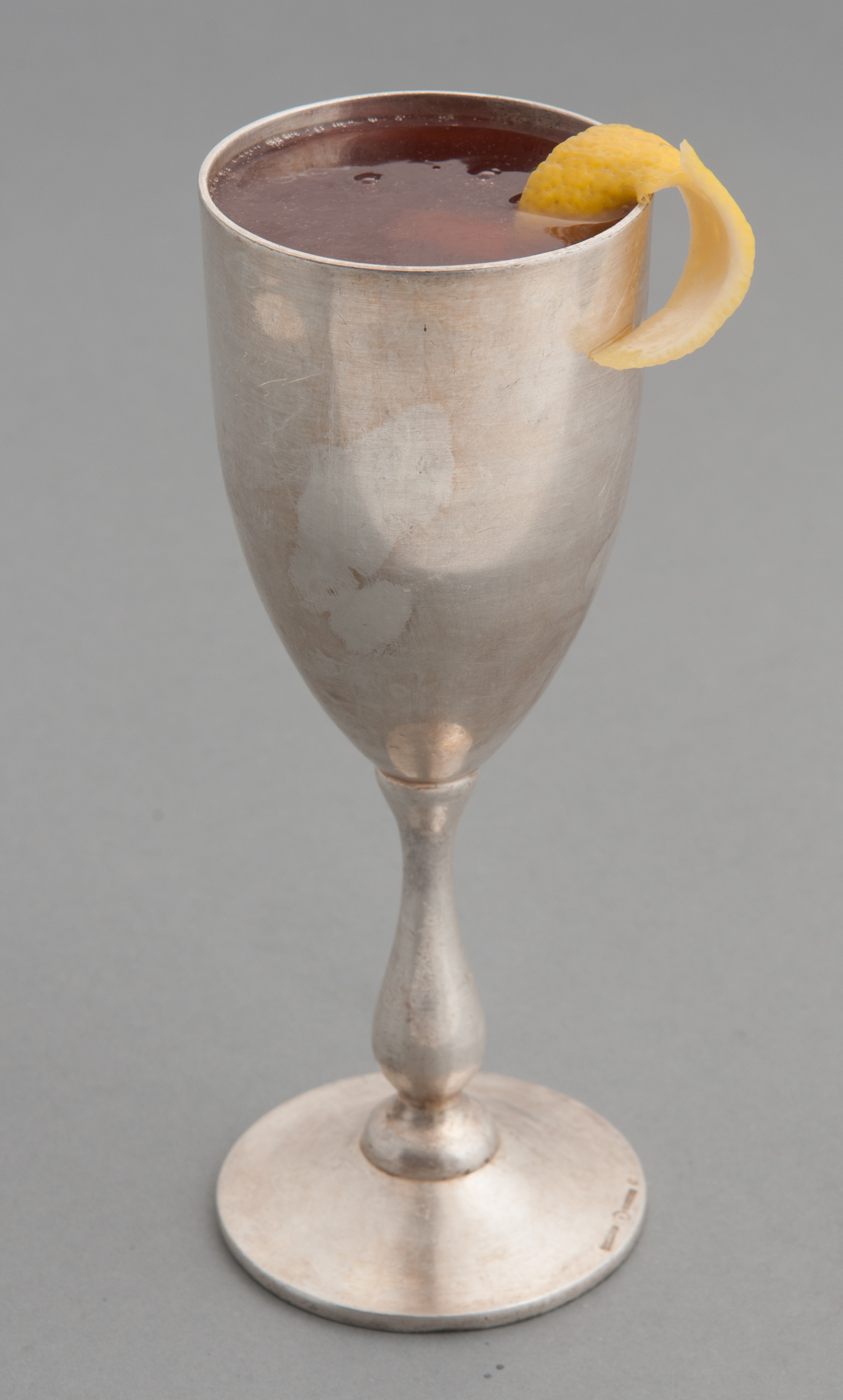
Prince of Wales

The Prince of Wales is a cocktail created by Albert Edward, Prince of Wales, who later became King Edward VII. There are several variations of the cocktail, but what they usually have in common is champagne, angostura bitters, sugar (or simple syrup), either rye whiskey or cognac, and a liqueur.

An anonymous biography of King Edward, The Private Life of King Edward VII, credits the drink to the Prince himself. The cocktail consisted of "a little rye whisky, crushed ice, a small square of pineapple, a dash of Angostura bitters, a piece of lemon peel, a few drops of Maraschino, a little champagne, and powdered sugar to taste."

The ingredients for a Prince of Wales are:

- 1 1/2 oz. (4.5 cl) rye
- 1 oz. (3 cl) Champagne
- 1 small piece pineapple
- 1 dash Angostura bitters
- 1/4 tsp (0.125 cl) Maraschino liqueur
- 1 tsp (0.5 cl) sugar (or simple syrup)

The drink is prepared by stirring sugar and bitters, adding whiskey and liqueur, then pineapple. These are shaken with crushed ice, the mix is strained into a cocktail glass, and then one adds the champagne. Some recipes use cognac or brandy instead of rye whiskey, Bénédictine or other liqueur in lieu of Maraschino, and orange in the place of pineapple. The methods of preparation also vary.

Meyer says that the cocktail is "a marvelous drink with the spicy rye ... and the sweet Maraschino and pineapple playing off each other and the bubbly tying it all together." According to André Dominé, Prince of Wales has bitter, sweet, and sour in perfect harmony.
