= Trinidad sour =

Type of cocktail

Trinidad Sour
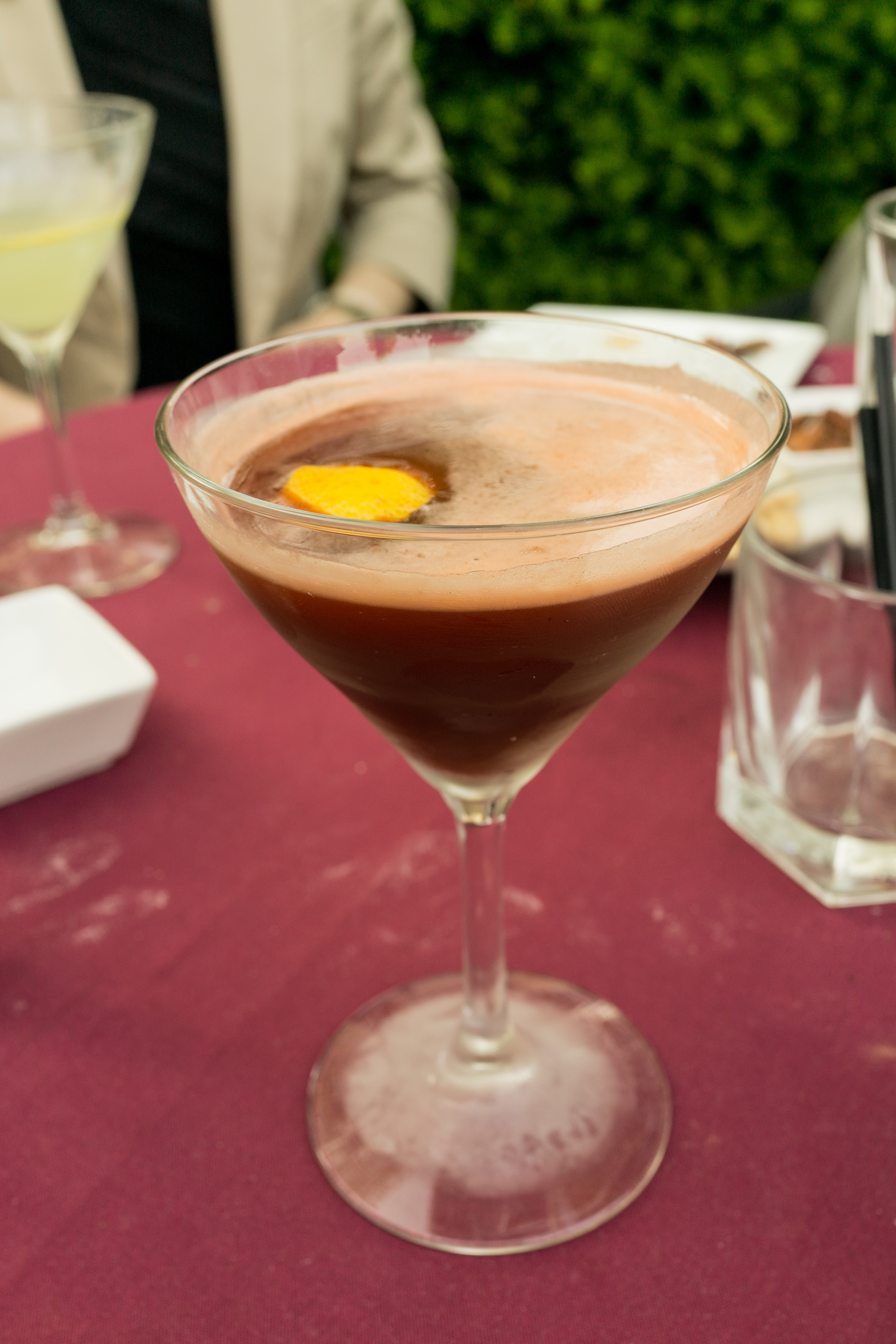
- Type: Cocktail
- Ingredients: 4.5 cl Angostura bitters; 3 cl orgeat syrup; 2.25 cl fresh lemon juice; 1.5 cl rye whiskey
- Base spirit: Angostura bitters
- Standard drinkware: Cocktail glass
- Served: Straight up: chilled, without ice
- Preparation: Pour all ingredients into a cocktail shaker, shake well with ice, strain into chilled cocktail glass.

The Trinidad Sour is an IBA official cocktail. Unusually for a cocktail, it uses Angostura bitters as its base spirit rather than merely as a flavoring agent. The bitters are the single largest component of the drink, in its IBA formulation. The Trinidad Sour was introduced in a 2009 competition by Giuseppe Gonzalez, but despite its bold flavors, it was a complete flop, failing to even make the competition's top ten. Over time, however, the drink gained popularity and has earned since its place as a modern classic.

== See also ==
- List of cocktails
