= Queen's Park Swizzle =

Alcoholic beverage

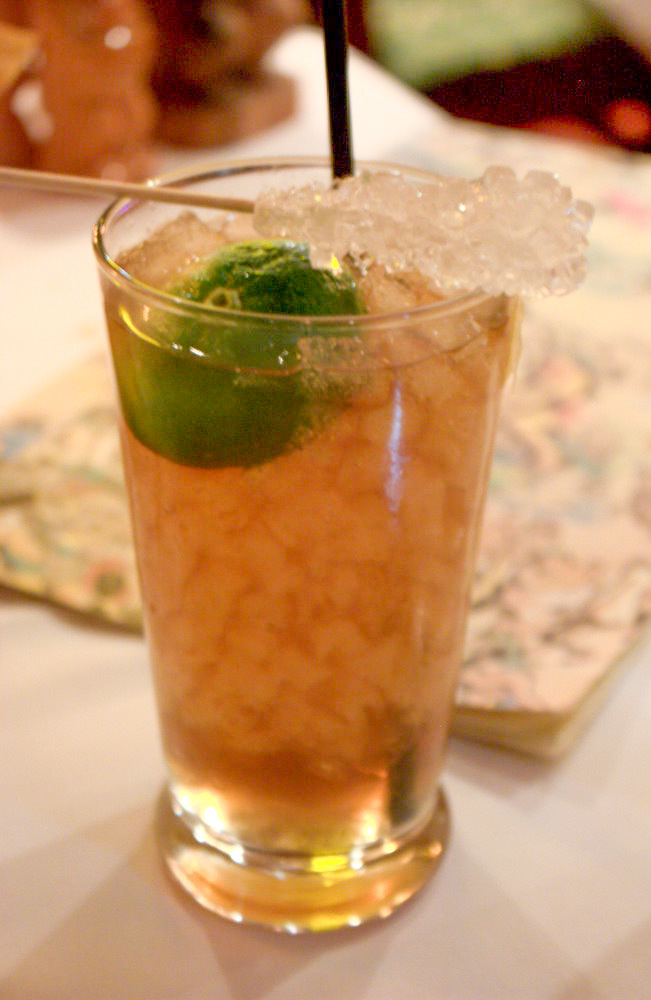
- Type: Mixed drink
- Ingredients: Mint, lime juice, rum, Angostura bitters, syrup, ice
- Standard drinkware: Collins glass
- Standard garnish: Mint sprig

The Queen's Park Swizzle is a classic rum cocktail that originated in Trinidad.

It is a prominent member of a cocktails genre from the West Indies that started most likely in the 19th century, but has gained recent popularity in New York City. Other drinks in genre include the Bermuda Swizzle and the Barbados Red Rum Swizzle. These drinks are "swizzled" with a swizzle stick. It is traditionally from a tree native to the Caribbean called Quararibea turbinate, locally known as the swizzle stick tree or commonly known as the South Caribbean evergreen tree. However, although there are wooden swizzle sticks in addition to metal and plastic ones in the present day, they are usually not from the original tree.

The ingredients of rum, lime juice, sugar, and mint are similar to the Mojito. One key ingredient that contrasts the drink is Angostura bitters, one of Trinidad's most famous exports. Also, the drink uses Demerara rum (rather than the light rum in the Mojito). Demerara rum comes from Guyana from sugarcane grown on the banks of the Demerara River, and is comparable to Jamaican rum.

House of Angostura from Trinidad has promoted it as Trinidad and Tobago's national drink.

== History ==
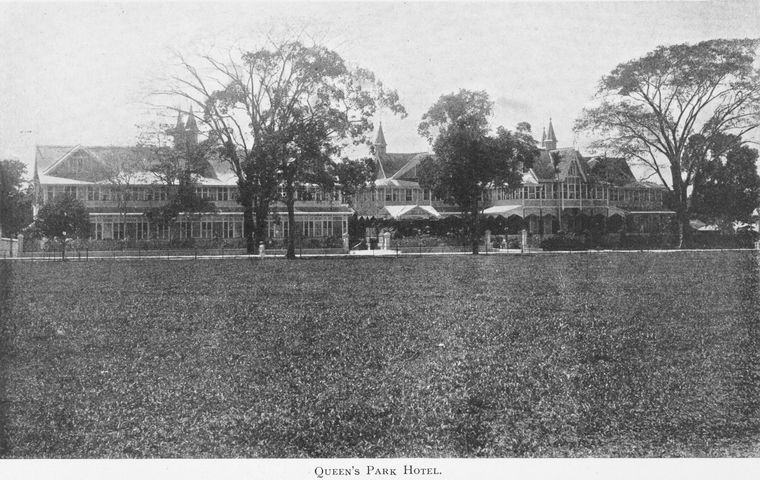
Queen's Park Hotel in 1904

The drink's name comes from the hotel, Queen's Park Hotel, in Port of Spain, Trinidad where it was first created in the 1920s. Port of Spain was at the time a thriving trade center and vacation destination among the wealthy. The Queen's Park Savannah neighborhood was its leisure center of eating, drinking and dancing, and the Queens Park Hotel was the main attraction. The hotel opened on January 15, 1895.

The hotel was moderately successful through 1920, and more so after the 18th Amendment was passed, making the purchase and consumption of alcohol illegal in the United States. Prohibition prompted many well-to-do Americans to leave the country on weekend trips to the Caribbean where they could legally drink. Queen's Park Hotel has been said to be one of the grandest hotel bars at the time.

Hotels abroad hired previously employed American bartenders who brought in clients and cocktail expertise. The Queen's Park Hotel asked the bartenders to concoct a signature drink. They modified a popular drink at the time, the Daiquiri, and added mint and locally made Angostura bitters.

The Queen's Park Swizzle enjoyed many years of popularity. Trader Vic's named it "the most delightful form of anesthesia given out today" in 1946. Bergeron wrote in the 1972 edition of the Trader Vic's Bartender's Guide, "If you like to make and drink a real doozer of a rum drink that really is a rum drink, try this. It’s from the Queen’s Park Hotel in Trinidad." The original Queen's Park Hotel closed in 1996.

== Preparation ==
The drink is traditionally served in a Collins or highball glass. In the glass, mint leaves are muddled with lime juice and syrup (Demerara or simple). Demerara rum, Angostura bitters, and then crushed ice is added. The drink is swizzled with a swizzle stick until the drink is mixed and the glass is completely frosted. A bar spoon can substitute the swizzle stick. The swizzle method allows the muddled mint to stay at the bottom. Sometimes, bitters are added to the crushed ice to give the ice layer a red appearance, so that the drink will have green, gold, and red layers. The drink is then garnished with a mint sprig.

== Variations ==
The Kona Swizzle is a variation of the Queen's Park Swizzle and contains spiced rum, coffee, and orgeat.
