= Cocktail strainer =

Type of strainer used for mixed drinks

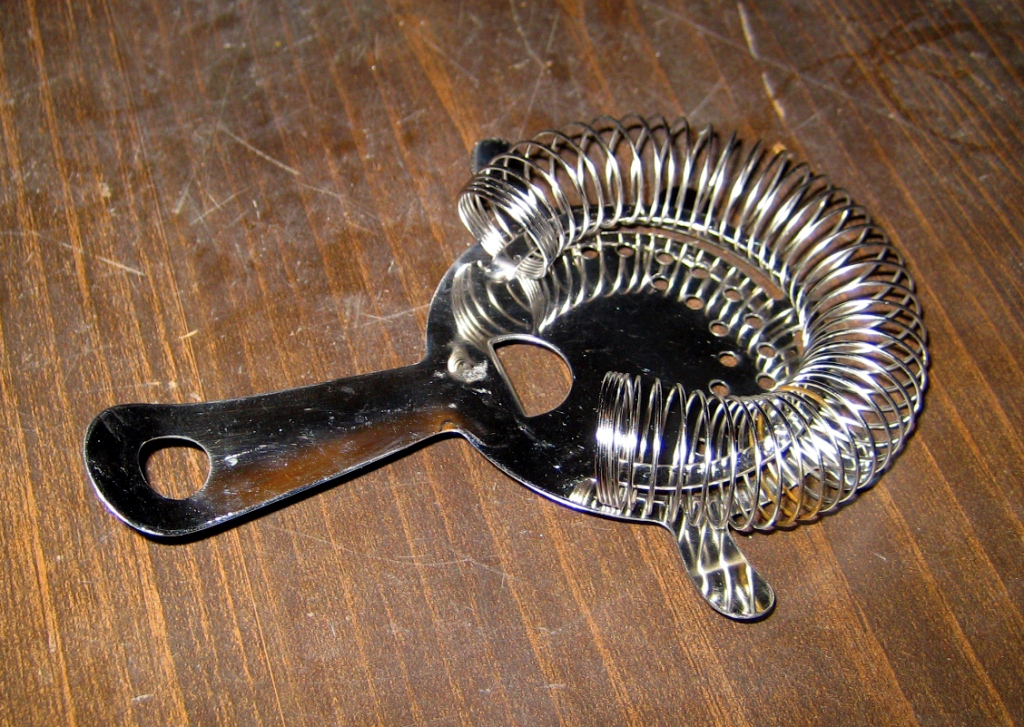
A Hawthorne strainer

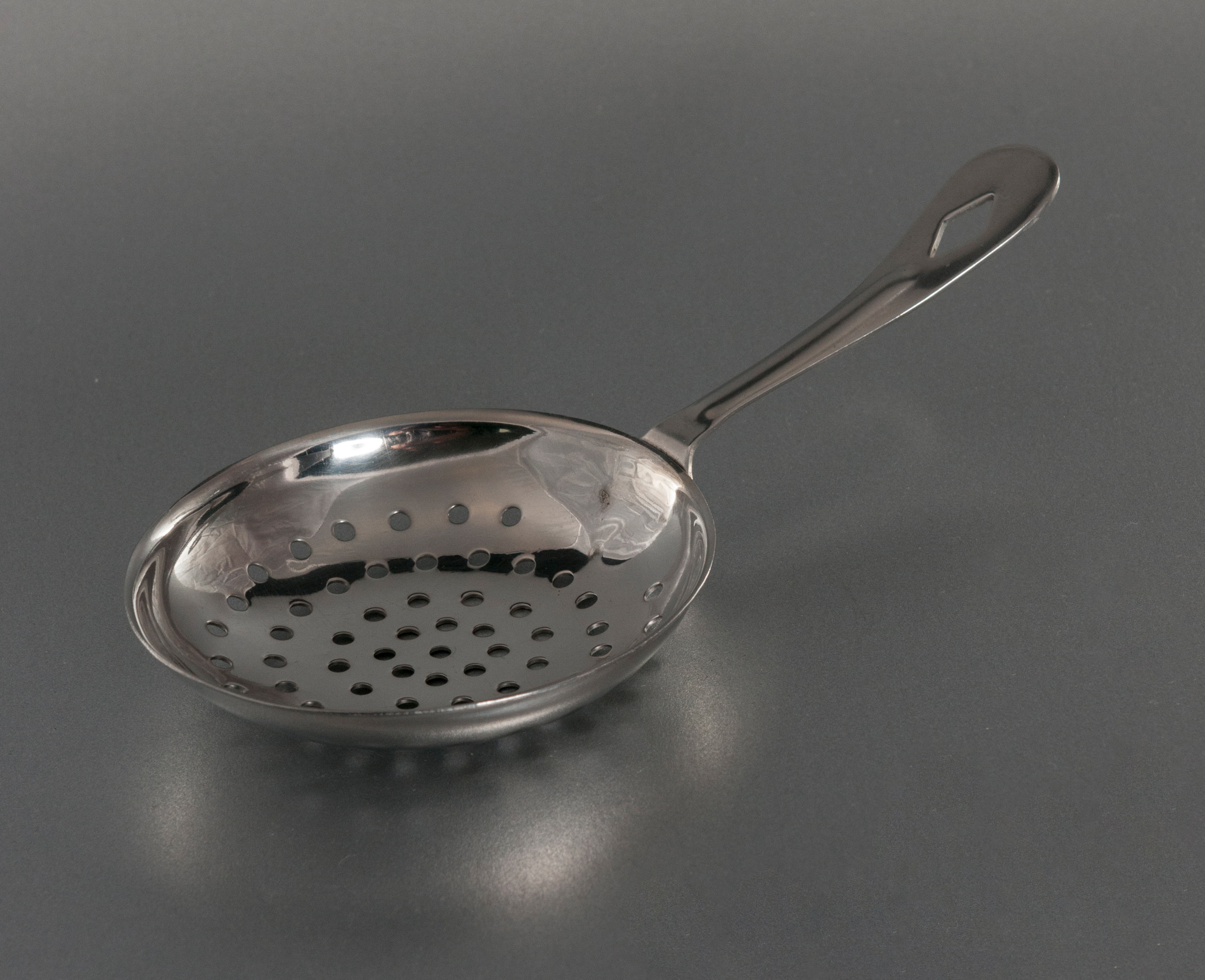
A Julep strainer

A cocktail strainer is a metal bar accessory used to remove ice from a mixed drink as it is poured into the serving glass. A type of sieve, the strainer is placed over the mouth of the glass or shaker in which the beverage was prepared; small holes in the device allow only liquids to pass as the beverage is poured.

There are two common types of strainers. The Hawthorne strainer is a disc (called the "rim") with a handle and two or more stabilizing prongs, called ears. A metal spring fixed around the edge of the rim rolls inward to fit inside the glass. The rim of the strainer does not need to touch the rim of the glass, as the spring inside filters out the ice.

The Julep strainer is shaped like a bowl with a handle, and will fit tightly into a mixing glass or shaker when inserted at the proper angle. Liquid passes through holes or slits in the bowl.

== History ==
The need for tools to strain ice in cocktails became essential after ice became widespread in the mid-19th century. In 1868, the first specifically designed cocktail strainer, the Julep strainer, was invented. The strainer was modelled after European sugar-sifting spoons. The Hawthorne strainer was invented in the early 1890s, as an improvement upon earlier strainer types. The Hawthorne strainer derives its name from The Hawthorne Café in Boston. The Hawthorne strainer did not gain its stabilizing ears until the early 20th century.
