= Champagne cocktail =

Cocktail of champagne and Angostura bitters

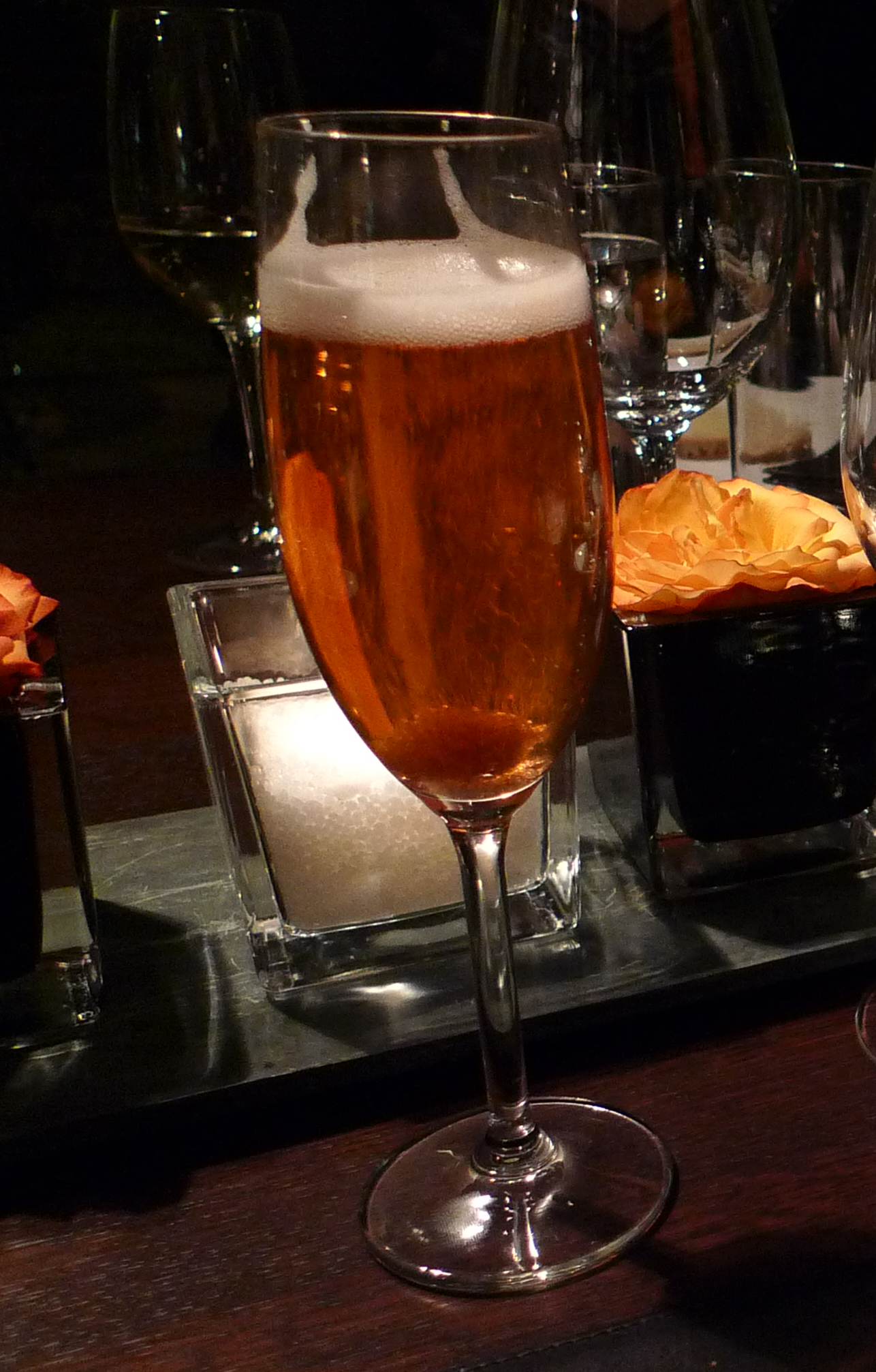
- Type: Cocktail
- Ingredients: 9cl Champagne; 1cl Cognac; 2 dashes Angostura bitters; 1 Sugar cube
- Standard drinkware: Champagne flute
- Standard garnish: Orange slice and maraschino cherry
- Served: Straight up: chilled, without ice
- Preparation: Place the sugar cube with 2 dashes of bitters in a large Champagne glass, add the cognac. Pour gently chilled Champagne. Garnish with orange zest and maraschino cherry.

A champagne cocktail is an alcoholic cocktail made with sugar, Angostura bitters, champagne, brandy, and a maraschino cherry as a garnish. It is one of the IBA official cocktails. Other variations include grenadine, orange bitters, cognac (substitute of brandy) or sparkling wine (substitute for champagne). Other possible garnishes include strawberries or dried orange slices.

A recipe for the cocktail appears as early as "Professor" Jerry Thomas' The Bon Vivant's Companion (1862), which omits the brandy or cognac and is considered to be the "classic" American version. Harry Johnson was one of the bartenders who revived the model by adding other fruit to the mix.
