= Rob Roy (cocktail) =

Whisky and vermouth cocktail

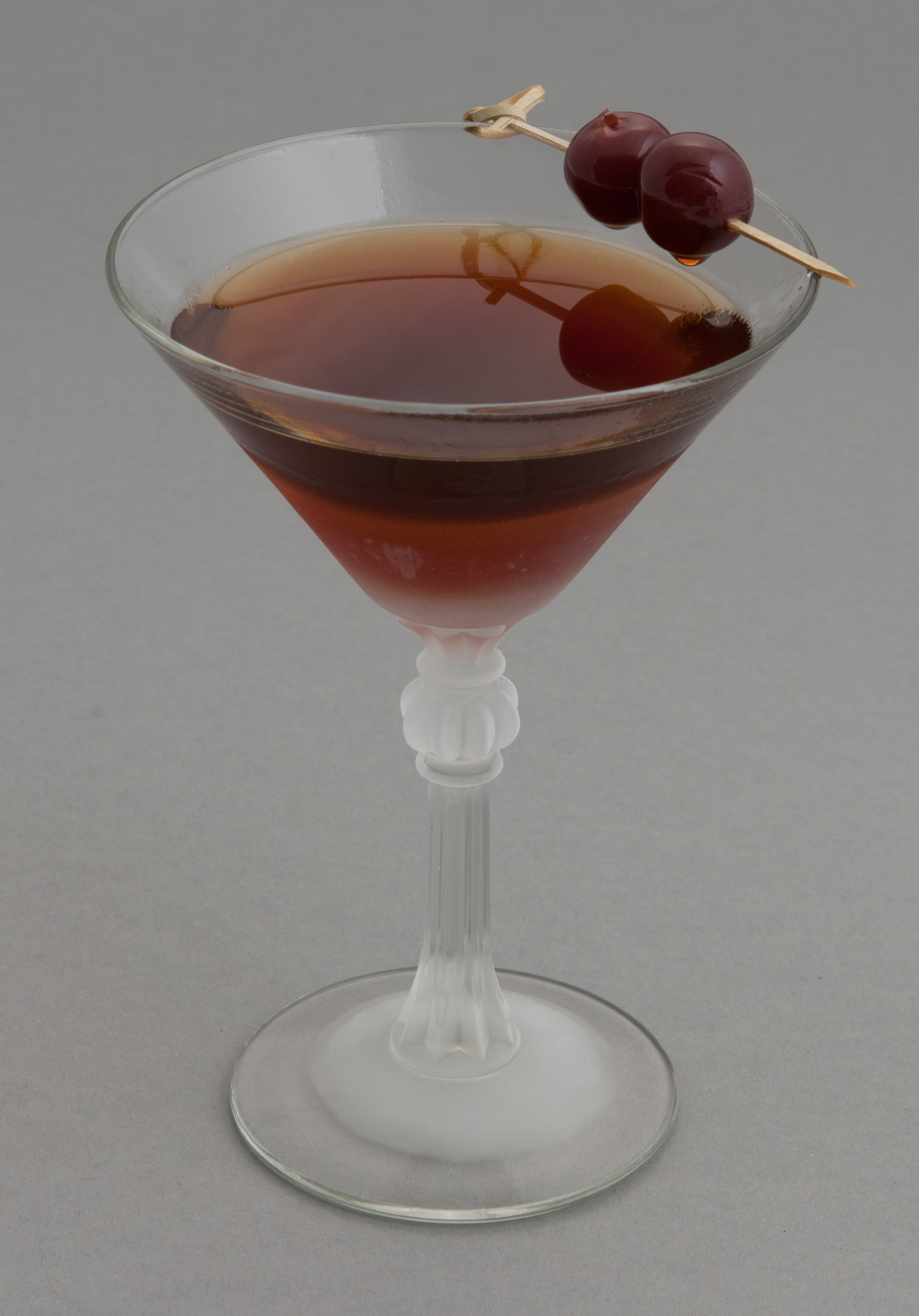
- Type: Cocktail
- Ingredients: 4.5 cl Scotch whisky; 2.5 cl Sweet vermouth; Dash Angostura bitters
- Base spirit: Scotch whisky
- Standard drinkware: Cocktail glass
- Standard garnish: 2 Maraschino cherries on a skewer or lemon twist
- Served: Choice of "straight up" or " On the rocks"
- Preparation: Stir over ice, strain into chilled glass, garnished and serve straight up, or mix in rocks glass filled with ice

The Rob Roy is a cocktail consisting primarily of Scotch whisky and vermouth, created in 1894 by a bartender at the Waldorf Astoria in Manhattan, New York City. The drink was named in honor of the premiere of Rob Roy, an operetta by composer Reginald De Koven and lyricist Harry B. Smith loosely based upon Scottish folk hero Rob Roy MacGregor, and the Walter Scott novel about him.

A Rob Roy is similar to a Manhattan, but is made exclusively with Scotch whisky; the Manhattan is traditionally made with rye, and today also commonly made with bourbon or Canadian whisky. While this version of a Manhattan may have been first dubbed a Rob Roy in 1894, the Manhattan made with Scotch whisky first appears in print ten years earlier in a London bar guide by Charlie Paul.

Like the Manhattan, the Rob Roy can be made "sweet", "dry", or "perfect". The standard Rob Roy is the sweet version, made with sweet vermouth, so there is no need to specify a "sweet" Rob Roy when ordering. A "dry" Rob Roy is made by replacing the sweet vermouth with dry vermouth. A "perfect" Rob Roy is made with equal parts sweet and dry vermouth.

The Rob Roy includes a dash of Angostura bitters (mostly for color), and is usually served in a cocktail glass garnished with two maraschino cherries on a skewer (for the standard version), or a lemon twist (for the perfect and dry versions).
