= Gunner (cocktail) =

Cocktail

A gunner is a cocktail served in clubs, bars, golf clubs, especially those that are popular with expats, in Singapore, Hong Kong and other parts of the Far East and India formerly under British colonial rule. It consists of equal parts ginger beer and ginger ale, with a dash of Angostura bitters, and sometimes a measure of lime cordial or lemon juice. It is regarded as a non-alcoholic drink. However, Angostura bitters is 44.7% alcohol by volume. It is noted for its refreshing qualities, especially in warm weather.

It was invented by Ewen Fergusson and Robert Renton at the Singapore Golf Club, now part of the Singapore Island Country Club.

The gunner has been described as "the only real Hong Kong cocktail".

Related drinks (or possibly alternative names) also known in Hong Kong as a "Gunners": Malawi shandy, rock shandy, Windermere, Lemon, Lime and Bitters.

== See also ==
- Lemon, lime and bitters - a similar Australian drink.
