= House of Angostura =

Trinidad and Tobago beverage company

- Type: Private
- Traded as: TTSE: AHL
- Industry: Beverages
- Founded: 1830 in Ciudad Bolívar, Venezuela
- Founder: Johann Gottlieb Benjamin Siegert
- Headquarters: Laventille, Trinidad and Tobago
- Number of locations: 8
- Area served: Worldwide
- Key people: Ian Forbes (CEO)Ag & (COO); Rahim Mohammed (Executive Manager of Business efficiency and shared services Kathryna Baptiste Assee (Corporate Secretary & Group General Counsel); Gary Hunt (chairman)
- Products: Rum, bitters, carbonated soft drinks
- Website: www.angostura.com

House of Angostura
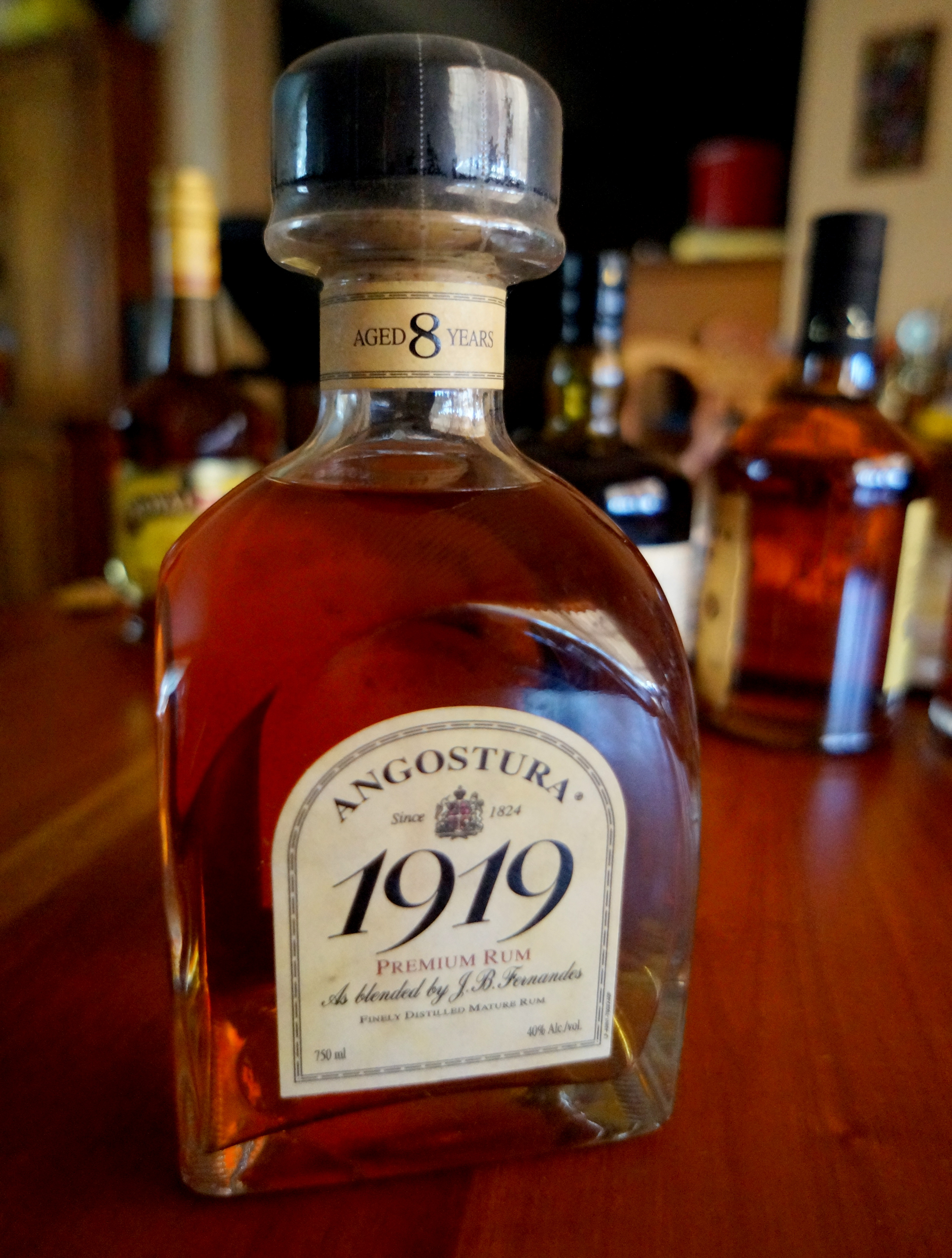
- Angostura 1919 Rum
- Type: Liquor
- Origin: Port of Spain, Trinidad and Tobago
- Introduced: Around 1830
- Website: www.angostura.com

The House of Angostura (English: /æŋɡəˈstjʊərə/), also known as Angostura Limited, is a Trinidad and Tobago company famous for the production of Angostura bitters, invented by the company's founder. The company is also a distiller and is the major producer of rum in Trinidad and Tobago. The company also has been used as a vehicle for international expansion by its parent company, CL Financial. As a result of these acquisitions, the company owns distillers in the United States, Canada, The Bahamas and Suriname. The current Chief Operations Officer Ian Forbes will act as chief executive officer from October 1st 2025 for six months, according to a Trinidad Guardian article. Other Executive officers are Rahim Mohammed executive manager of business efficiency and shared services, and Kathryna Baptiste Assee group general counsel & corporate secretary. The Current Board members are Patricia Dindyal, Shival Maharaj; Roxane De Freitas, Jennifer Frederick with former Minister of Sport Gary Hunt as chairman, all appointed on August 6th 2025.

== History ==
The company was founded around 1830 in the Venezuelan town of Angostura (now Ciudad Bolívar) by a German doctor, Johann Gottlieb Benjamin Siegert, Surgeon-General in Simon Bolivar's army in Venezuela. Around 1820, he had tried to find a medicine to improve appetite and digestive well-being of the soldiers.

From the beginning Dr. Siegert was determined to wrest a cure from nature itself, and after four years of trial and error, researching and analysing the qualities of tropical herbs and plants, he finally arrived at a unique blend of herbs in 1824, which he called "Amargo Aromatico" or aromatic bitters. [...] Dr. Siegert hoped to use the bitters to bring relief to his patients, his small circle of family and friends, but these events were to prove otherwise. From these humble beginnings an international industry was soon to rise.

In 1830, Siegert exported his unique aromatic bitters to England and Trinidad. By 1850, he had resigned his commission in the Venezuelan army to concentrate on the manufacture of his bitters, since by then, demand had leapt ahead of supply. In 1862, the product was exhibited and sampled in London International Exhibition of Industry and Art, with great approval. Upon his death in 1870, Siegert left the care of the company to his younger brother and son, who subsequently moved it to Port of Spain, Trinidad six years later in 1876.

Over the course of time, Angostura bitters and Dr. Siegert's company alone became purveyor to the King of Prussia, Spain, and King George V. Today, angostura bitters are also produced by various other vendors, some of which add the bark of the angostura tree (Angostura trifoliata). Angostura bitters are a key ingredient in many cocktails, for example in Old Fashioned, pink gin and the Manhattan. Angostura brand bitters do not contain any angostura bark. There are several other companies that make bitters containing this bark, notably Fee Brothers and Riemerschmid.

The word "Angostura" (lit. "Narrows") is the founding name of Ciudad Bolívar along the narrows of Venezuela's Orinoco River where Dr. Siegert was based. It was an important trading town with river access to the sea.

In 1973 House of Angostura bought Fernandes Distillers Ltd., a subsidiary of Trinidad Distillers Ltd, Angostura's holding company and the French Savalle still they used was dissassembled once distilling operations were merged.

In December 2016, questions arose regarding the integrity of Angostura rum, with CEO Robert Wong sent on administrative leave for two months. Reports say Angostura breached EU rules of origin laws by purchasing bulk rum and repackaging it, without making any substantial changes.

The company observed its 200th anniversary in 2024, as the government of Trinidad and Tobago reported that bitters represented 8% of the market value of exports in the food and beverage sector.

== Products ==
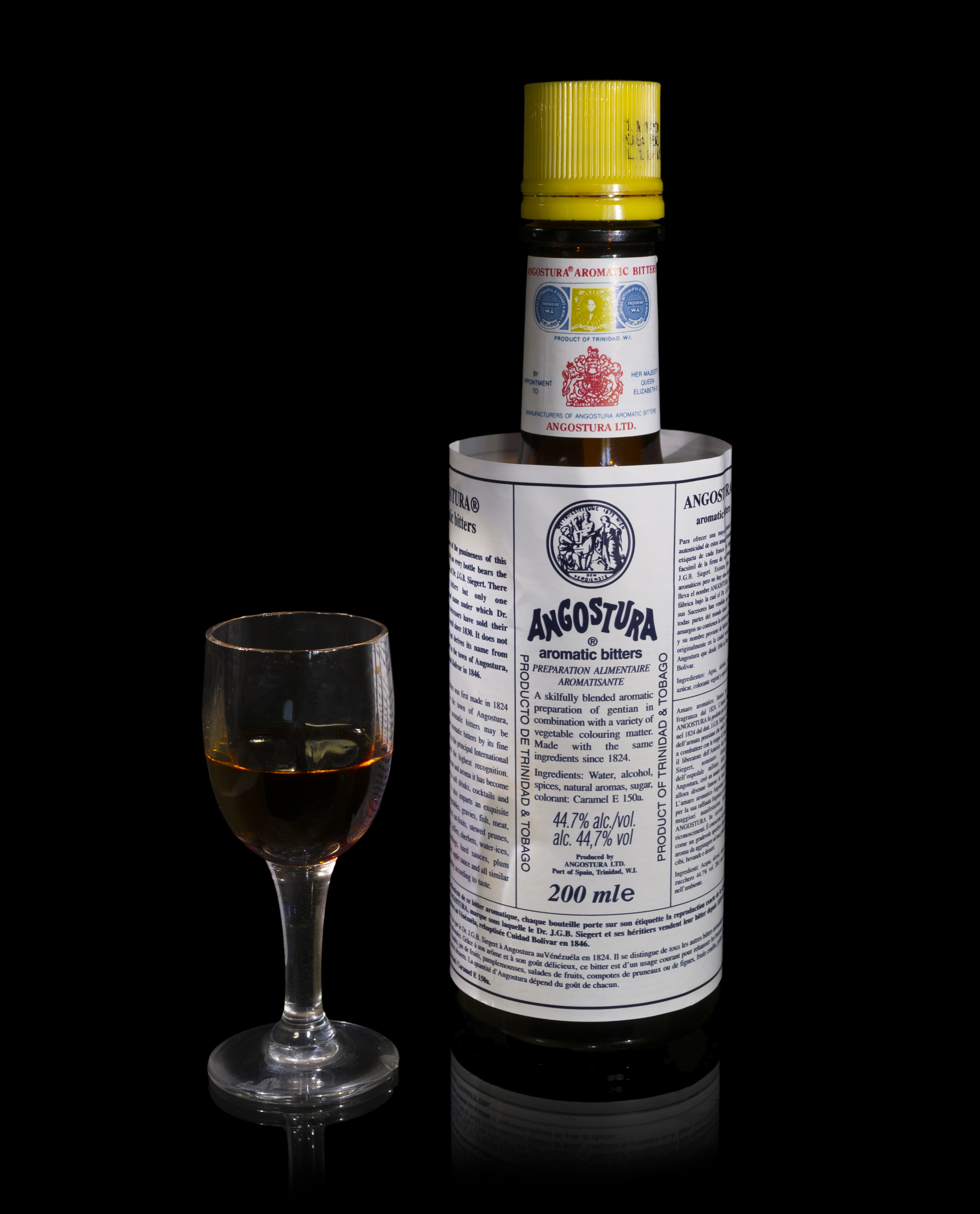
A bottle of Angostura Aromatic Bitters

- Forres Park Puncheon Rum: An over-proof rum originally developed for the exclusive use of the Fernandes family and their estate workers.
- White Oak: A white rum aged in American white oak barrels. Sold within the Caribbean and the top selling rum in Trinidad and Tobago.
- Fernandes Black Label: A golden rum that was originally produced by Fernandes Distillers.
- Single Barrel Reserve: A blend of rums aged in single select bourbon oak casks for a minimum of five years.
- Angostura Reserva: A white rum sold internationally that is aged for a minimum of three years before being filtered.
- Angostura 5 Year Old: A golden rum that is available internationally aged for a minimum of five years.
- Angostura 7 Year Old: A dark rum that is available internationally and aged for a minimum of seven years.
- 1919: A specially blended multiple award-winning rum, named for the year that it was originally blended.
- 1824: A premium Rum aged for a minimum of 12 years from casks specially selected by the master-blender. The name of this rum commemorates the year that Dr. Siegert develops Angostura aromatic bitters.
- 1787: A super-premium 15-year-old aged rum launched in 2016. The year 1787 marks the beginning of sugar production in Trinidad.
- Angostura No. 1 Premium Rum Cask Collection Batch: No. 1 is the first premium rum to be unveiled in The Cask Collection, a new limited-edition range dedicated to rums aged in special French bourbon casks. Aged 16 years. Only 15,030 bottles are available worldwide.
- Angostura No. 1: No. 1 is the first premium rum to be unveiled in The Cask Collection, a new limited-edition range dedicated to rums aged in special casks. Only 9,600 bottles are available worldwide.
- Legacy: A special blend of seven of the brand's most rare and precious rums. Only 20 bottles have been produced and until 2014, this was the most expensive rum in the world.
- Angostura Chill: A carbonated soft drink made with aromatic bitters. It debuted in July 2021 with Lemon, Lime & Bitters and Blood Orange & Bitters flavors. A Sorrel & Bitters flavor was launched in October 2021.
