= Meinhard's Bitters =

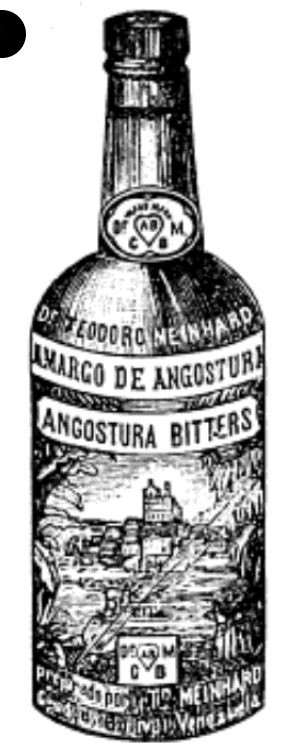
Image of bottle of "Amargo de Angostura by Dr Teodoro Mehinard"

Meinhard's Bitters was an alcoholic drink created and manufactured by Dr. Teodoro Meinhard, a German-born resident of Venezuela, and the founder of Meinhard & Company. The complete and exact name of Meinhard's Bitters is subject to some historical and legal question, and certainly changed over time. This brand of bitters came into existence in 1866 in Upata, Venezuela and manufacture moved in 1870 to Ciudad Bolívar (then called Angostura) Venezuela. The recipe was also licensed to Von Glahn Bros. and distributed as Caroni bitters in North America by 1893.

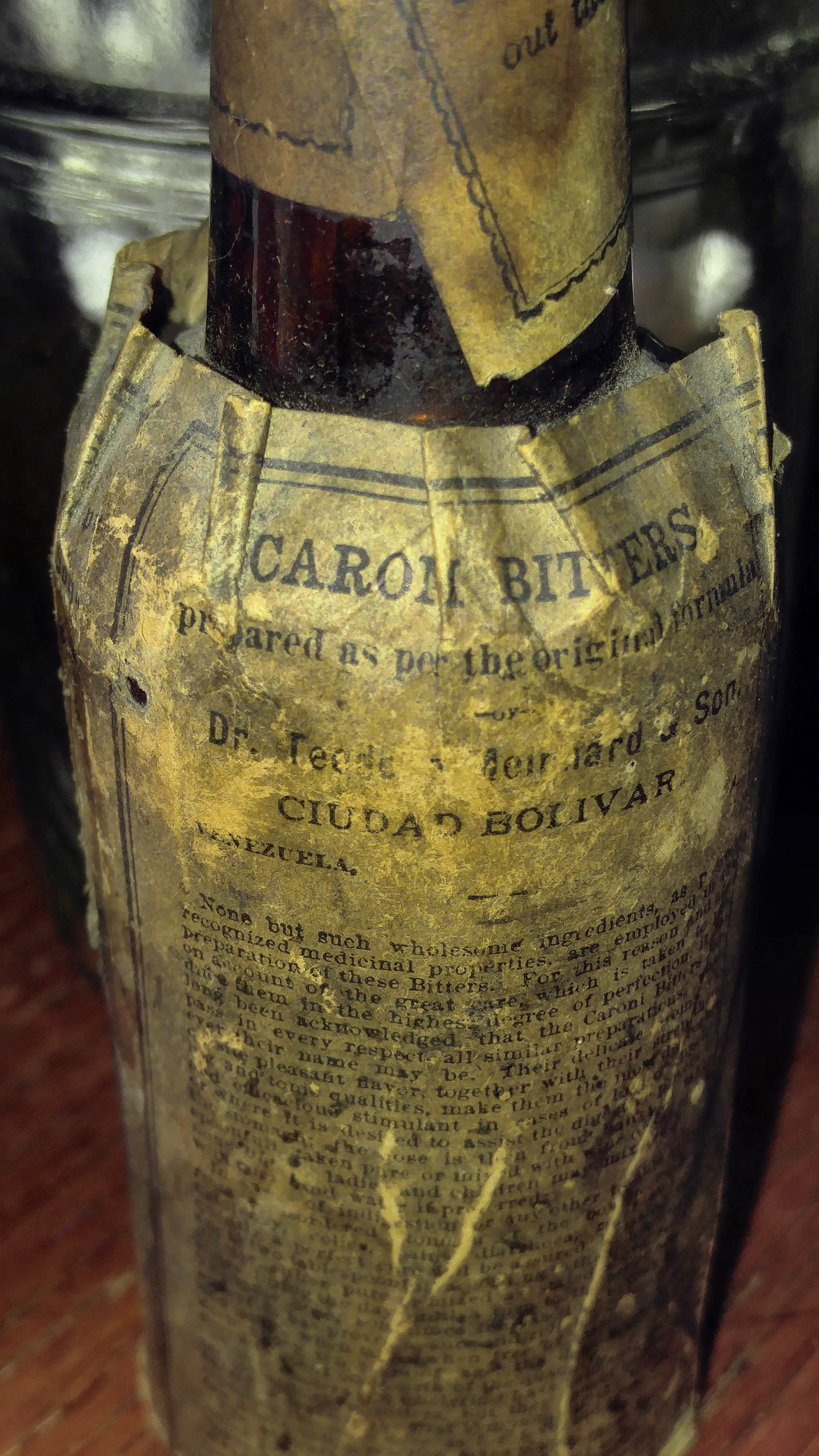
Caroni Bitters Bottle

== International operations ==
Meinhard's bitters are documented to have been exported to both Germany and England from Venezuela. Evidence exists of export to other destinations, including the United States, Australia, Chile, Argentina, Austria, Hungary, Belgium, France, and Singapore.

In 1874, Schultheis F. & Mensing (Ferdinand Schultheis & Herman R. Mensing) at 36 Water, New York City, were listed as importers of "Angostura Bitters of Teodoro Meinhard"

In 1875, Meinhard set up a branch office in Hamburg, Germany, to manufacture and export his product. This office was set up at least in part in response to high Venezuelan export tariffs on liquor and Hamburg's status as a free trade zone. and "A. F. Nagel, of Hamburg ... was the general agent for the sale in Europe of Meinhard's bitters". Alphons Libbertz was the proprietor of the Hamburg branch, while George Pflumer of Hameln a.d. Weser is listed as another contact for sales in Germany, Austria, Hungary, and Belgium.

Several records put the bitters in Australia. 19 cases of "Bolivar Bitters" were sold at auction in Melbourne in 1887, 22 cases were auctioned in Brisbane in 1891. Theodor Ripke is also listed as a trustee for "Dr Theodor Meinhard's Amargo de Bolivar", a bitters at the 1888 Melbourne, Australia Exhibition.

Guillermo E. Mönch of Ciudad Bolívar represented "Amargo de Ciudad Bolivar" at the 1893 World's Columbian Exposition in Chicago.

Leon de la Cova, the council for Venezuela in Philadelphia, received and exhibited for Meinhard's Bitters at the Centennial Exhibition in the United States. However any sale or distribution within the United States after an injunction served by Pennsylvania courts is unknown.

A newspaper advertisement lists "Everett & Co." as the agent for Bolivar Bitters prepared by Dr. Teodoro Meinhard in Singapore in 1885.

The exact time when Meinhard's bitter ceased production is also unknown. After the death of founder Teodoro Meinhard and later his widow, the branch office in Hamburg became the sole manufacturer of this product. In October 1897, the German Government required the name and label of the product be changed to read "Doctor Teodoro Meinhard's Succr" to reflect the fact the product was now manufactured by the successors of the late Dr. Meinhard.

== Legal history ==
Perhaps the most interesting aspect of the history of Meinhard's Bitters is the legal battles surrounding the use of the name "Angostura Bitters". Meinhard and his distributors were involved in at least three legal actions with the founder of rival bitters manufacturer Angostura bitters, Dr. Johann Gottlieb Benjamin Siegert.

- Siegert v. Wm. H. Knoepfel – New York Supreme Court in 1873
- Siegert v. Ehlers - Trinidad & Tobago Court in 1874
- Siegert et al. v. Meinhard et al. – Pennsylvania Supreme Court in 1877
- Siegert v. Findlater – in a British court, Chancery Division, 15 January 1878
- Siegert and Sons v. Maclean and Feely - in the Argentine Supreme Court, 1882

The Findlater case is of legal interest. The case was published in legal journals worldwide, and is still cited in modern court cases as one of the foundations of English trademark law. In summary, Meinhard was selling his brand of bitters under the name "Angostura Bitters by Teodoro Meinhard" and successfully trademarked the name "Angostura" in Great Britain. Siegert sued Meinhard's distributor, Findlater, who was indemnified from fault in the case by Meinhard's representatives, claiming that although the name "Angostura" was not copyrighted by Siegert in Great Britain, it was in fact the name by which Siegert's brand of bitters was popularly known in that country. The court upheld Siegert's claim to the uncopyrighted name "Angostura", creating an often-cited precedent in British law.

After losing the case, it is unknown exactly what name Meinhard used for his products in Great Britain. During the Centennial Exhibition of Australia, the product was identified as "Dr. Theodor Meinhard's Amargo de Bolivar" in 1888. However, later publications continued to refer to the product as "Angostura Bitters by Teodoro Meinhard".

== Awards ==
- Diploma at the Exhibition of Vienna, Austria, in 1873
- Diploma to Teodoro Meinhard's "Amargo de Angostura" in Santiago, Chile in 1875, Original certificate in collection of Netherlands' National Archives
- Diploma commending for the purity and genuineness of the compound at the United States Centennial International Exhibition 1876
- Medals at the Paris, France Exhibition 1878
- Medal at Buenos Aires, Argentina 1882
- Silver medal at Bordeaux, France, 1882
- Medal at Hamburg, Germany, 1889

== Locating historical documents ==
- Fallos de la Corte Suprema de Justicia de la Nación: Con la relación de sus respectivas causas By Argentina Corte Suprema de Justicia de la Nación Published 1865 Portions of this book have been digitized by Google Books
- Official Catalogue of the Collective Exhibition of the German Industry in Articles of Food, at Paris International Exhibition, published 1900, in the collection of the New York Public Library – digitized by Google Books
- Duguid, Paul 1954 – "Developing the Brand: The Case of Alcohol, 1800–1880" Enterprise & Society – Volume 4, Number 3, September 2003, pp. 405–441 Oxford University Press Available online from University of Berkley
- Chambers, Montagu: Law Journal Reports for the year 1878, Original from Oxford University Portions of this book have been digitized by Google Books
- Reports and Awards, United States Centennial Commission. International Exhibition, 1876 Published 1878, pp. 322 Book digitized by Google Books
- M. L. Hutchinson: Official Catalogue of the Exhibits Centennial International Exhibition (1888–1889 Melbourne, Vic.), published 1888 digitized by Google
- The Official Catalogue of the Exhibits: With Introductory Notices of the Countries Exhibiting, published by M. L. Hutchinson, 1888 digitized by Google
- Weekly Notes of Cases Argued and Determined in the Supreme Court of Pennsylvania, the County Courts of Philadelphia, and the United States District and Circuit Courts for the Eastern District of Pennsylvania By Pennsylvania Supreme Court, United States Circuit Court (3rd Circuit), United States District Court (Pennsylvania : Eastern District) digitized by Google
- New York Tribune article available from Fulton History
