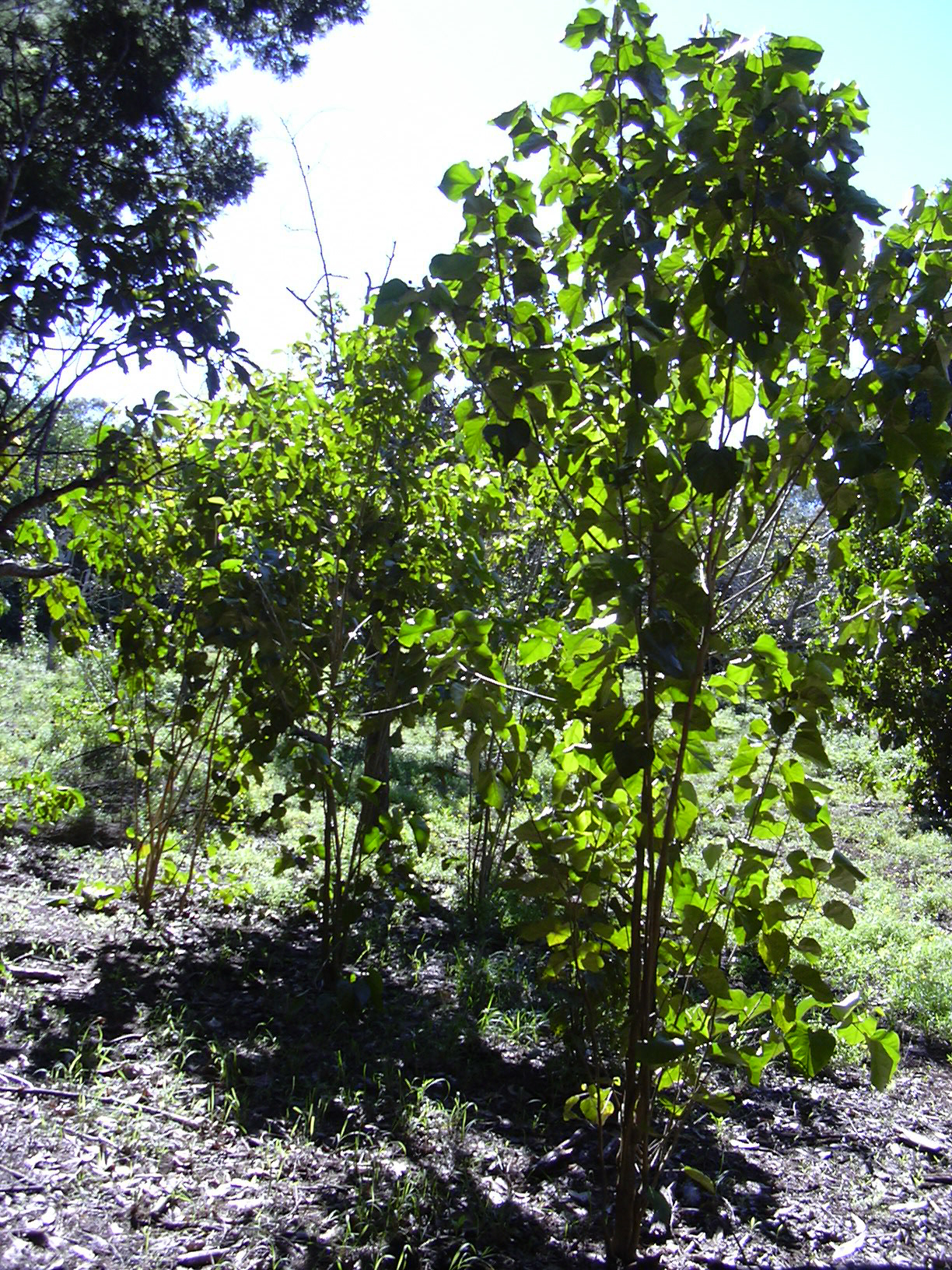

Scientific classification
- Kingdom: Plantae
- Clade: Tracheophytes
- Clade: Angiosperms
- Clade: Eudicots
- Clade: Rosids
- Order: Malpighiales
- Family: Euphorbiaceae
- Genus: Croton
- Species: C. guatemalensis

Binomial name
- Croton guatemalensis Lotsy

= Croton guatemalensis =

Copalchi

Species of flowering plant

Croton guatemalensis, known as copalchi, is a plant species of the genus Croton.

It is found from Mexico to Central America. It is also known as 'cascarilla,' the bark of which may be an ingredient in Angostura bitters.
