= Angostura bitters =

Concentrated bitters made of water, alcohol, herbs and spices

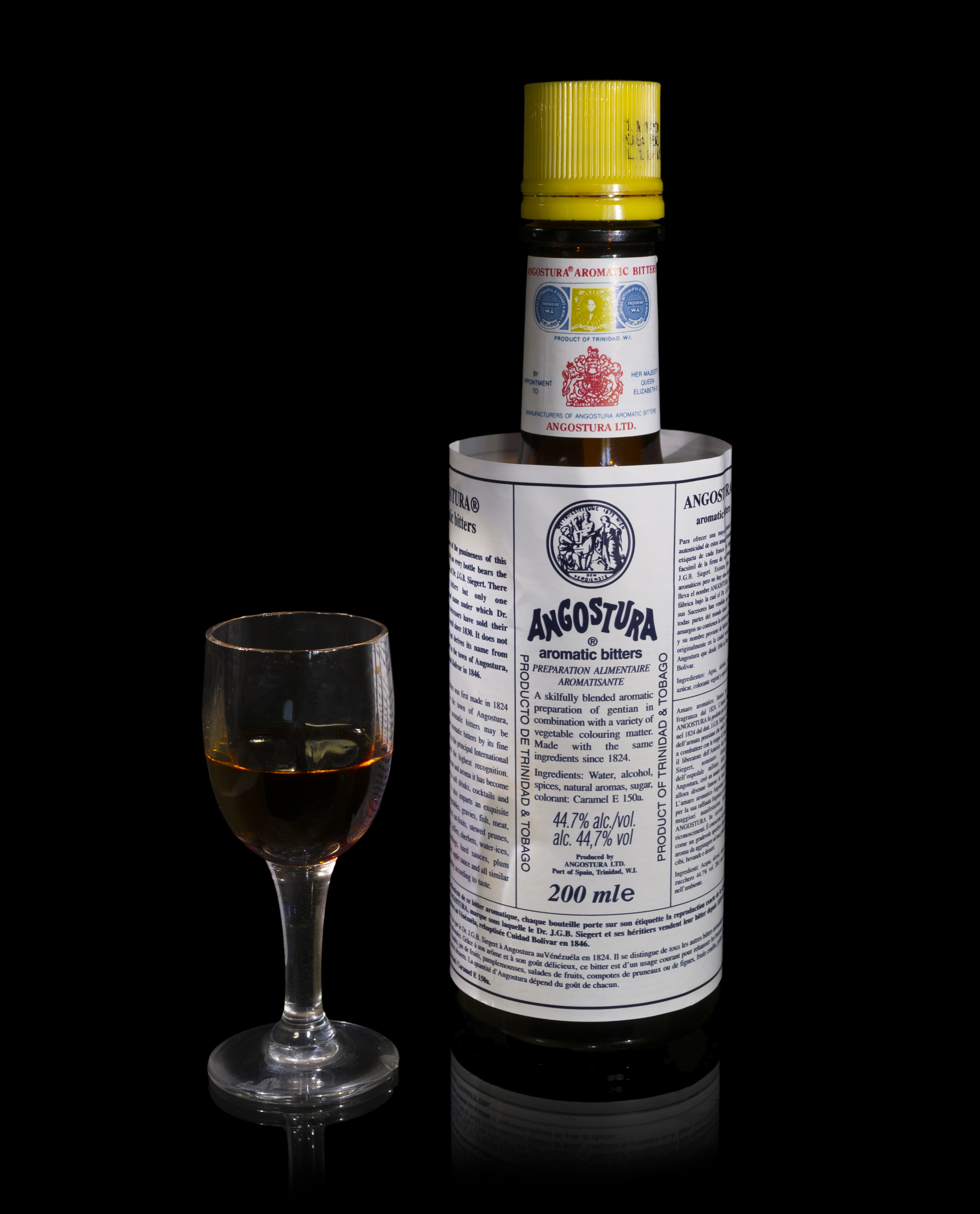
A bottle of Angostura aromatic bitters with its distinctive oversized label

Angostura bitters (English: /æŋɡəˈstjʊərə/) is a concentrated bitters (herbal alcoholic preparation) based on gentian, herbs, and spices, produced by the House of Angostura in Trinidad and Tobago. It is typically used for flavouring beverages or, less often, food. The bitters were first produced in the namesake town of Angostura (now Ciudad Bolívar, Venezuela) but do not contain angostura bark. The bottle is recognisable because of its distinctive oversized label and yellow cap. Angostura is Spanish for "narrowing", the town of Angostura having been at the narrowing of the Orinoco River.

Beverages named "Angostura Bitter" or "Angobitter" are also offered from other brands (e.g., Riemerschmid, Hemmeter). Unlike the House of Angostura product, they contain angostura bark, possibly to justify the use of the word "angostura" in their names.

== History ==
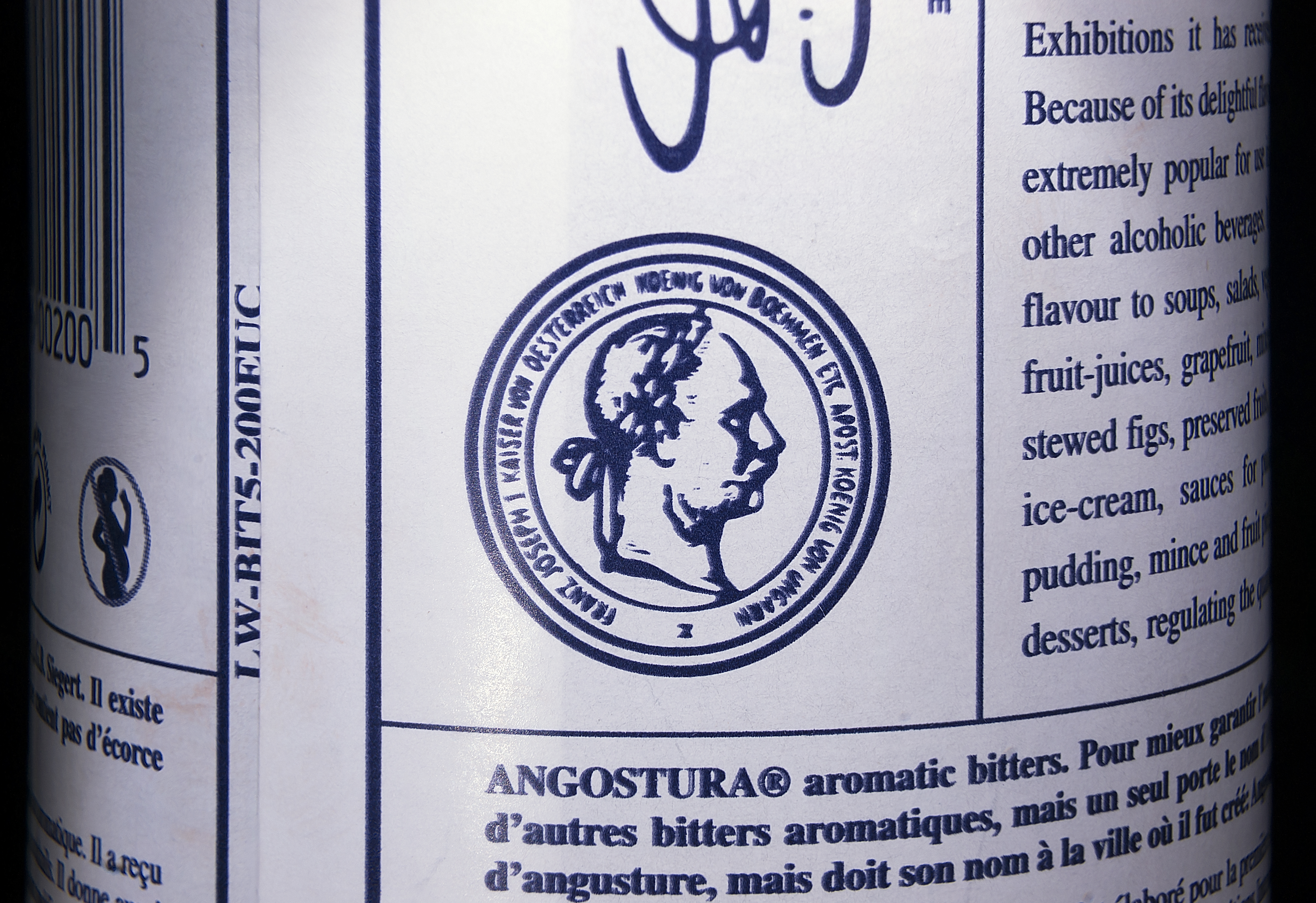
Emperor Franz Joseph I of Austria is shown on the label, since Angostura won a medal at the 1873 World Fair in Vienna.

The recipe was developed as a tonic by Johann Gottlieb Benjamin Siegert, a German surgeon general in Simón Bolívar's army in Venezuela. Siegert began selling it in 1824 and established a distillery for that purpose in 1830. Siegert was based in the town of Angostura (later renamed Ciudad Bolívar) and used locally available ingredients, perhaps aided by the indigenous people's botanical knowledge. The product was sold abroad from 1853, and in 1875, the sons of Dr. Siegert moved the manufacturing from Ciudad Bolivar to Port of Spain, Trinidad, where it remains.

Angostura won a medal at the 1873 Vienna World's Fair. The medal is still depicted on the oversized label, along with the reverse, which shows Emperor Franz Joseph I of Austria in profile.

The exact formula is a closely guarded secret, with only one person knowing the whole recipe, passed familially.

Since 2007, Angostura has also produced Angostura Orange, an orange bitters with bright floral notes and fresh orange peel. Angostura Orange has not dominated the orange bitters market in the same way that its aromatic bitters have become an essential product for bars and consumers.

In 2009, a shortage of Angostura bitters occurred; the company reported that the primary problem was a shortage of bottles. Incorrect rumours arose of a product recall or that production of the bitters had stopped at the plant in Trinidad. The shortage of bitters was the subject of many news articles and blog posts, particularly in the cocktail industry.

The company observed its 200th anniversary in 2024, as the government of Trinidad and Tobago reported that bitters represented 8% of the market value of exports in its food and beverage sector.

== Uses ==
Angostura bitters is extremely concentrated and may be an acquired taste; though 44.7% alcohol by volume, bitters is not commonly ingested undiluted, but instead used in small amounts as flavouring.

=== Medicinal ===
Angostura bitters are alleged to have restorative properties. Angostura brand bitters is often incorrectly believed to have poisonous qualities because it is associated with angostura bark (which it does not contain), which, although not toxic, during its use as a medicine was often adulterated by unscrupulous sellers, who padded out the sacks of bark with cheaper, poisonous Strychnos nux-vomica or copalchi bark. Angostura is still often used by Trinidadians to treat digestive problems, under the assumption that the ingredient gentian may aid indigestion.

=== Cocktails ===
Angostura bitters is a key ingredient in many cocktails. Originally used to help soldiers with upset stomachs in Simón Bolívar's army, it later became popular in soda water and was usually served with gin. The mix is stuck in the form of a pink gin, and is also used in many other cocktails, such as long vodka, consisting of vodka, bitters, and lemonade. In the United States, it is best known for its use in whiskey cocktails – old fashioneds, made with whiskey, bitters, sugar, and water, and Manhattans, made usually with rye whiskey and red vermouth. In a pisco sour, a few drops are sprinkled on top of the foam, both for aroma and decoration. In a champagne cocktail, a few drops of bitters are added to a sugar cube.

The Trinidad sour is an unusual cocktail in that Angostura bitters serve as the base spirit rather than simply a flavoring. In this drink, the bitters are supplemented by orgeat syrup, rye whiskey, and fresh lemon juice.

In Hong Kong, Angostura bitters are included in the local Gunner cocktail. Though not in the classic recipe, bartenders sometimes add more flavour to the mojito cocktail by sprinkling a few drops of Angostura bitters on top. Bitters can also be used in "soft" drinks; a common drink served in Australian and New Zealand pubs is lemon, lime and bitters. In Malawi, and many other countries, bitters is added to a mix of crushed ice, ginger ale, and Sprite to make a rock shandy.

The most prominent purveyor of Angostura bitters in the world is Nelsen's Hall Bitters Pub on Washington Island off the northeast tip of Door Peninsula in Door County, Wisconsin. The pub began selling shots of bitters as a "stomach tonic for medicinal purposes" under a pharmaceutical license during Prohibition in the United States. The practice, which helped the pub become the oldest continuously operating tavern in Wisconsin, remained a tradition after Prohibition was repealed. As of 2018, the pub hosts a Bitters Club, incorporates bitters into its food menu, and sells upwards of 10,000 shots per year.

=== Popular recipes ===
- Bolivar sour
- Brut cocktail
- Champagne cocktail
- Cuba Libre
- Fallen angel
- Gunner
- Lemon, lime and bitters
- Manhattan
- Old fashioned
- Pink gin
- Pisco sour
- Prince of Wales
- Rum punch
- Queen's Park Swizzle
- Rob Roy
- Singapore sling
- Trinidad Sour
- Zombie

== See also ==
- Gentian
- Meinhard's Bitters
- Peychaud's Bitters
