= Orange bitters =

Cocktail flavoring

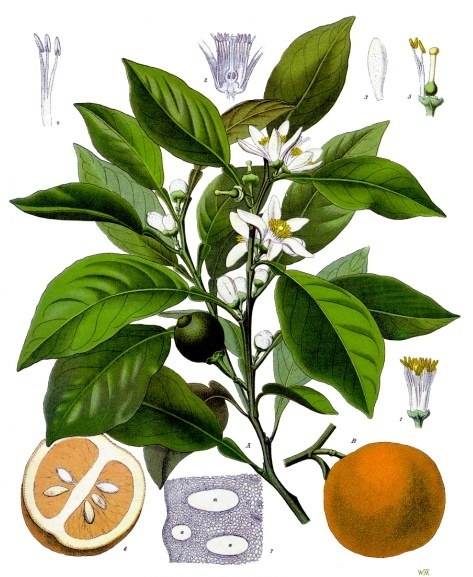
Bitter orange

Fee Brothers West Indian Orange Bitters

poster 'Oranje Bitter As' op distillery Simkens in Antwerp, Belgium, JM.2021.0033.00, Jenevermuseum

Orange bitters is a form of bitters, a cocktail flavoring made from such ingredients as the peels of Seville oranges, cardamom, caraway seed, coriander, anise, and burnt sugar in an alcohol base. Orange bitters, which are not to be confused with the standard Angostura aromatic bitters, are currently enjoying a resurgence among cocktail enthusiasts. The widely-known House of Angostura is one of the producers of orange bitters.

For many years, it was difficult to find orange bitters in the United States and elsewhere. Because of this, some cocktail recipes that traditionally contained orange bitters may now exclude that ingredient.

Renowned mixologist Gary Regan created Regan's Orange Bitters (stylized and trademarked as Regans') in the 1990s. Regans' is bottled and sold by the Sazerac Company, whose chief executive officer, Mark Brown, had worked with Regan to create a modern version of these bitters. Since 2006, the Bitter Truth in Germany has produced all-natural orange bitters, and there are now a number of different brands on the market.

Different orange bitters are sometimes mixed to hit the desired note. For example, a "Feegan's", often used in a Manhattan, consists of an equal-parts mix of Fee Bros West India Orange Bitters and Regans' Orange Bitters No. 6. This is done to balance out the candy-like sweetness of Fee's and the heavy cardamom note of Regans'.

Orange bitters can also be made at home, allowing one to create new flavor profiles that are not available anywhere else. The process of making orange bitters takes several days. While orange bitters are typically alcoholic, there are several brands of non-alcoholic bitters available.

Drinks whose recipes can include orange bitters include the Old Fashioned, the dry martini, and the revolver.
