= Lemon, lime and bitters =

Mixed drink of lemonade, lime juice and bitters

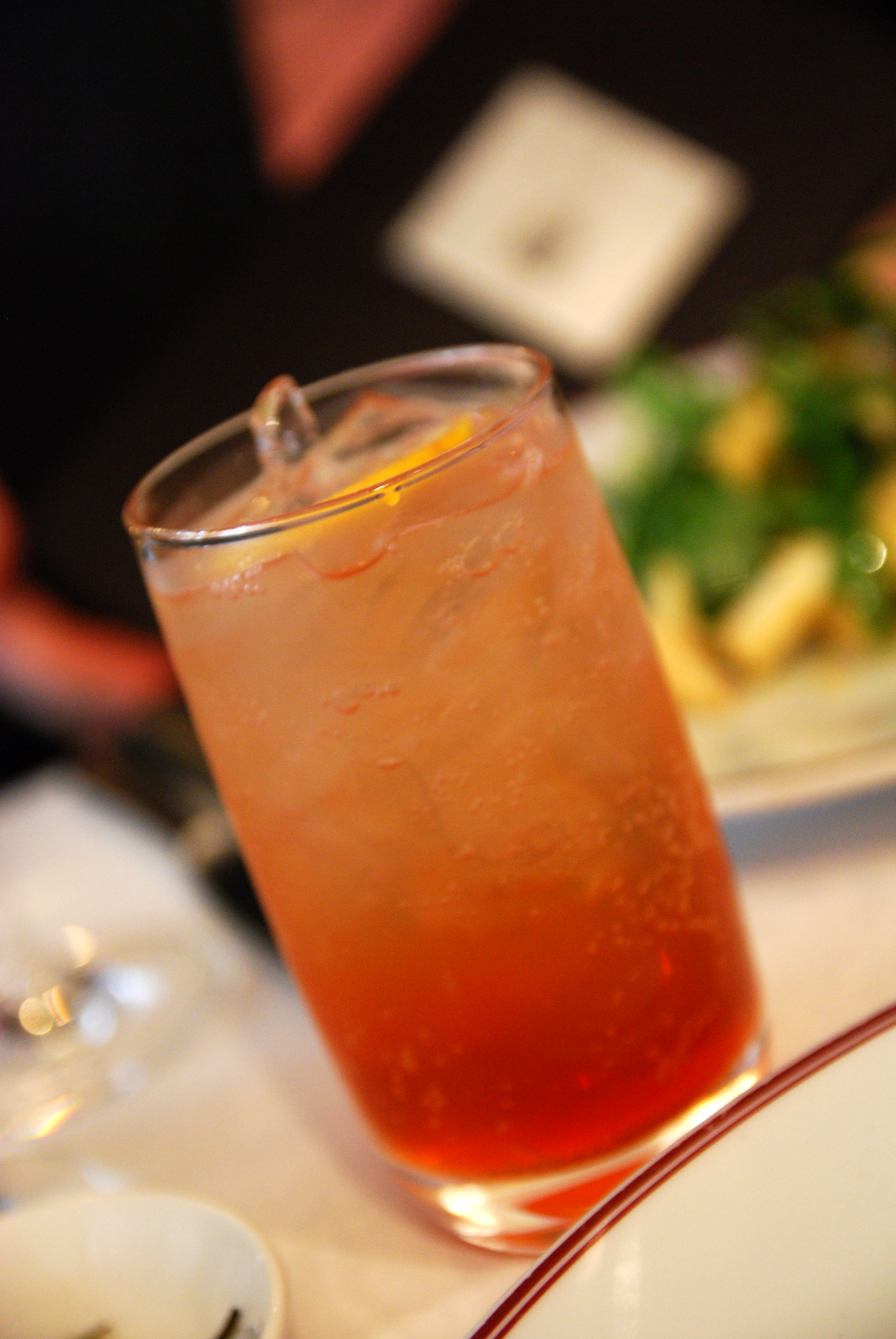
- Type: Mixed drink
- Origin: Australia
- Ingredients: Lemonade; Lime juice cordial (aka sweetened lime juice); Bitters
- Standard drinkware: Highball glass
- Standard garnish: Slice of lemon or lime
- Served: Straight up or with ice
- Preparation: Rim the inside (and optionally outside) of the glass with 4 to 5 dashes of Angostura Bitters then pour lemonade and lime cordial (15–30 mL) into glass. Garnish with Lemon if desired. Has 0.2% alcohol. Angostura LLB is available in cans as well in a pre-mixed version.

Lemon, lime and bitters (LLB) is a mixed drink made with clear lemonade, lime cordial, and bitters. The drink is thought to have been invented in Australia sometime in the 1880s with the addition of lime to lemonade and bitters, an existing home remedy drink. It has been described by the Australian Broadcasting Corporation as "Australia's national drink" due to its ubiquity on restaurant menus and availability as a pre-mixed beverage.

It was served as a non-alcoholic alternative to "Pink Gin" (gin mixed with Angostura bitters).

== History ==
The exact origin of lemon, lime and bitters is unknown, but it is claimed to have been invented and popularised within Australia sometime around 1880. Consequently, LLB is widely consumed in Australia and New Zealand where it became customary for golf players to have a drink of LLB after a match of golf.

It is made to order in most bars but a pre-mixed version is made by a number of soft drink companies and is widely available in supermarkets.

Wimmers Premium Soft Drinks Company from Cooroy in Queensland, Australia were the first to commercialise Lemon, Lime and Bitters into a ready-made soft drink in the 1920s using Angostura bitters.

== See also ==
- Gunner (cocktail) - a similar Hong Kong drink, with ginger ale, lemon juice and bitters.
- List of cocktails
