= The World's Drinks and How to Mix Them =

1900 cocktail manual

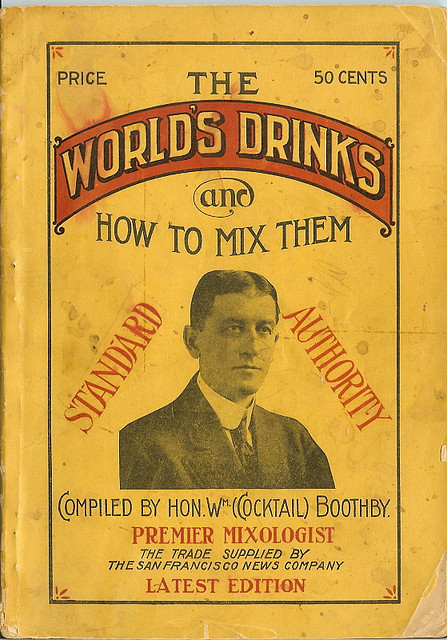
- The World's Drinks And How To Mix Them, interior book cover or frontispiece (paperback edition)
- Author: William "Cocktail" Boothby
- Language: English
- Publisher: Palace Hotel
- Publication date: 1891
- Publication place: United States

The World's Drinks And How To Mix Them is a cocktail manual by William "Cocktail" Boothby originally published in 1891, with revised editions in 1908, 1930 and 1934. The publisher was the Palace Hotel in San Francisco, where Boothby worked.

The cover of the 1908 edition describes this as the "Standard Authority" by a "Premier Mixologist".

The book published the first recipe for the sazerac, one of the earliest recipes for a dry martini, as well as the Bronx cocktail.
