= William T. Boothby =

American bartender and writer

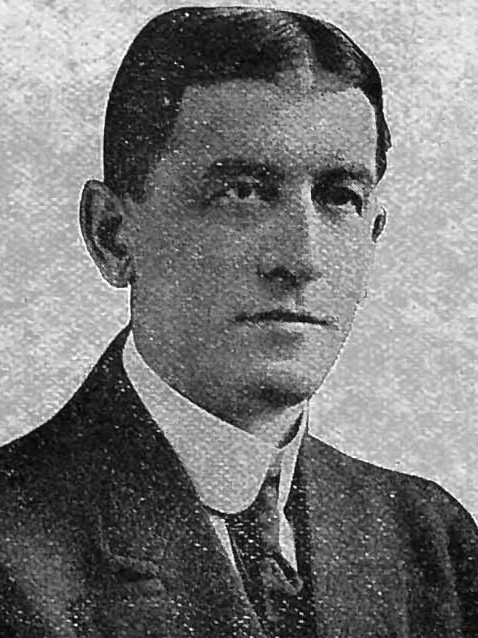

Member of the California State Assembly from the 44th district
- In office January 7, 1895 – January 4, 1897
- Preceded by: J. M. Marks
- Succeeded by: Leon Dennery

Personal details
- Born: November 10, 1862 San Francisco, California, U.S.
- Died: August 4, 1930 (aged 67) San Francisco, California, U.S.
- Party: Republican

The front cover of Boothby's 1891 book Cocktail Boothby's American Bar-Tender

William Thomas "Cocktail Bill" Boothby (November 10, 1862 – August 4, 1930) was an American bartender and writer of San Francisco, California in the years before and after the 1906 San Francisco earthquake. He tended bar for many years at San Francisco's Palace Hotel. He also served in the California State Assembly for the 43rd district from 1895 to 1897.

Based on California State Legislature records, he was a resident of San Francisco in January 1895. Based on copyright registration for his 1907/1908 edition of The World's Drinks And How To Mix Them, he was a resident of or had an office in Mountain View, California in 1907.

According to the introduction of the post-earthquake edition, the 1906 "Great Quake" destroyed the plates for his earlier version of The World's Drinks And How To Mix Them.

Boothby's place in the growth of the cocktail is significant; his first bar manual in 1891 contained 20 cocktail recipes among the drinks; the 1934 book under his name contains 172 pages of them.

== Career ==
- Minstrel performer.
- Bartender in New York, Chicago, Philadelphia, New Orleans, and Kansas City.
- Bartender at Byron Hot Springs.
- Bartender (or in his words "presiding deity") at Hotel Rafael, San Rafael, California, in "the gay days when Baron von Schroeder was making history over there".
- Bartender at the Silver Palace, San Francisco.
- Bartender at the Palace Hotel, San Francisco.
- Saloon owner.
- "Self appointed" California legislator in 1895.
- Soda drink counter supervisor, Olympic Club, during Prohibition.

== Bibliography ==
1. Cocktail Boothby's American Bartender (1891) (as William T. Boothby) This book was described in 1934 as "a scarce item for collectors" and went through three editions (1891, 1900, 1900) selling 50,000 copies.
2. Cocktail Boothby's American Bartender (2009) (New edition from Anchor Distilling) Based on the 1891 edition. Reproduced with the original cover art.
3. The World's Drinks And How To Mix Them (1908) (as Hon. Wm. T. Boothby)
4. Cocktail Bill Boothby's World Drinks And How To Mix Them (1930) (as Hon. Wm. T. Boothby)
5. Swallows (1930)
6. Cocktail Bill Boothby's World Drinks And How To Mix Them (1934) (as Hon. Wm. T. Boothby)
7. Cocktail Bill Boothby's Guida alle bevande del mondo e alla loro preparazione. Oltre 1700 ricette (2023) Edizioni Sandit Libri
