= Pink gin =

Cocktail of gin and bitters; also a fruit-flavoured style of gin

- Type: Cocktail
- Ingredients: One part Plymouth gin; One Part Water; Dash of Angostura Bitters (adjust to taste)
- Base spirit: Gin
- Standard drinkware: Cocktail glass
- Standard garnish: lemon
- Served: straight up; on the rocks
- Preparation: Chill the glass, then coat the inside with the Bitters. Add the gin very well chilled, garnish and serve.

Pink gin is a traditional cocktail fashionable in England from the mid-19th century, consisting of Plymouth gin and a dash of Angostura bitters, colouring the drink pink. The cocktail is typically topped up with water. Lemon rind is commonly used as a garnish, with the citrus essential oils subtly complementing the flavour.

Since the 21st century, the term 'pink gin' also refers to a style of gin infused with red fruits that give it a pink color.

== Cocktail origins ==
Pink gin is widely thought to have been created by members of the Royal Navy. Plymouth gin was added to Angostura bitters to make the consumption of Angostura bitters more enjoyable as they were used as a treatment for sea sickness in 1824 by Dr. Johann Gottlieb Benjamin Siegert.

The Royal Navy then brought the idea for the drink to bars in England, where this method of serving was first noted on the mainland. By the 1870s, gin was becoming increasingly popular and many of the finer establishments in England were serving pink gins.

== Cocktail variants ==
A typical pink gin is one part gin and one dash of angostura bitters. Though there are no major variations of pink gin, many bartenders vary the amount of angostura bitters used. Typically the drink is topped up with iced water, rarely without water.

A bartender may ask customers whether they want it "in or out", upon which the bartender swirls the angostura bitters around the glass before either leaving it in, or pouring it out (leaving only a residue), and then adding the gin.

It is also common for pink gin to be served as 'pink gin and tonic', typically consisting of 4 dashes of angostura bitters and 2 shots of gin, which is then topped up with tonic water. This is served in a highball glass over ice, and then can be garnished with lemon.

Cedric Charles Dickens (great-grandson of Charles Dickens) records in Drinking With Dickens that a Burnt Pink Gin consists of 1 tsp (5 mL) Angostura set afire by heating over a flame and then poured into a large tot of dry gin, adding cold water to taste.

== See also ==
- Bitters
- Gin
- List of cocktails
