= Cocktail shaker =

Device used to mix beverages

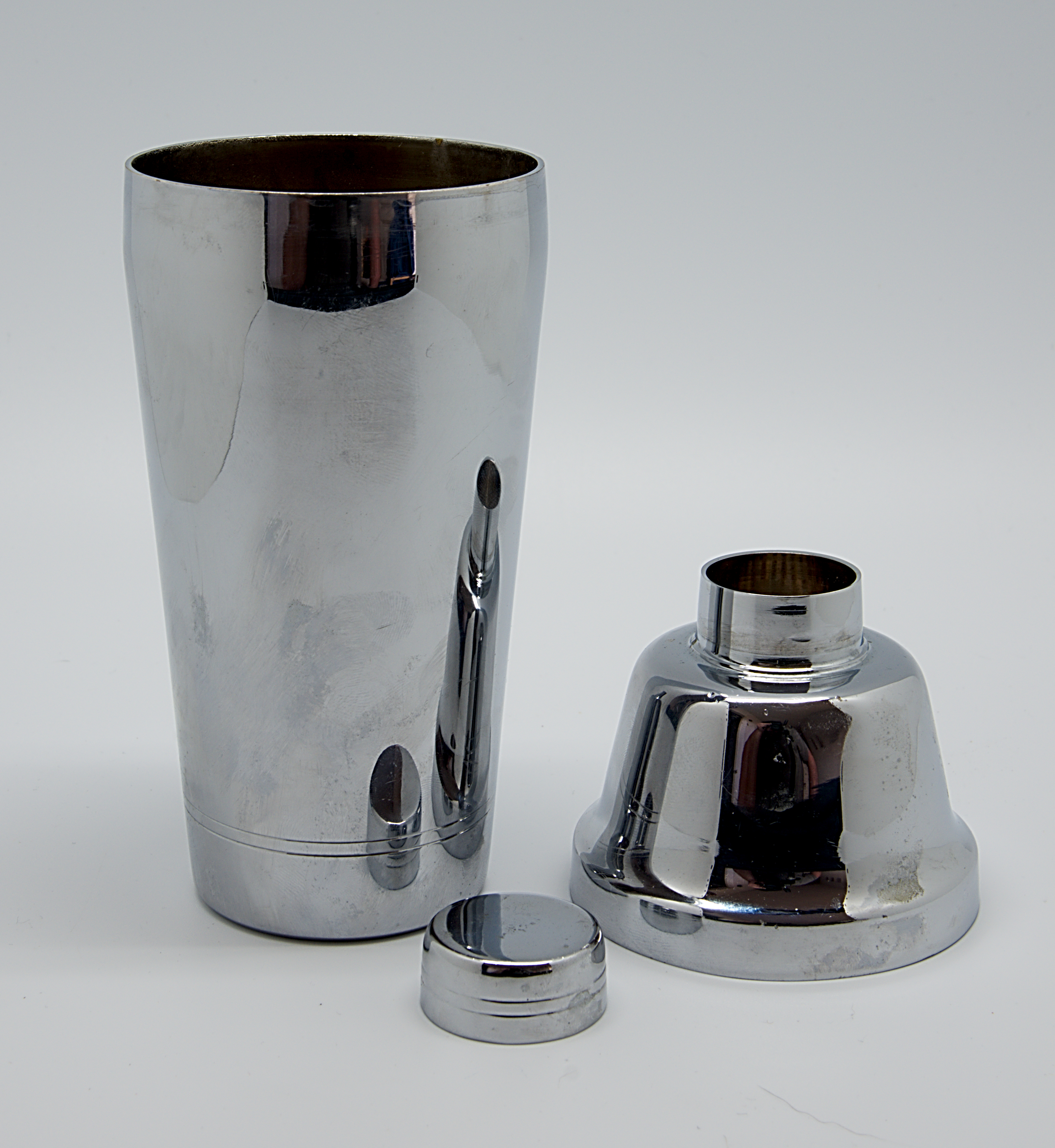
The three parts of a Cobbler shaker

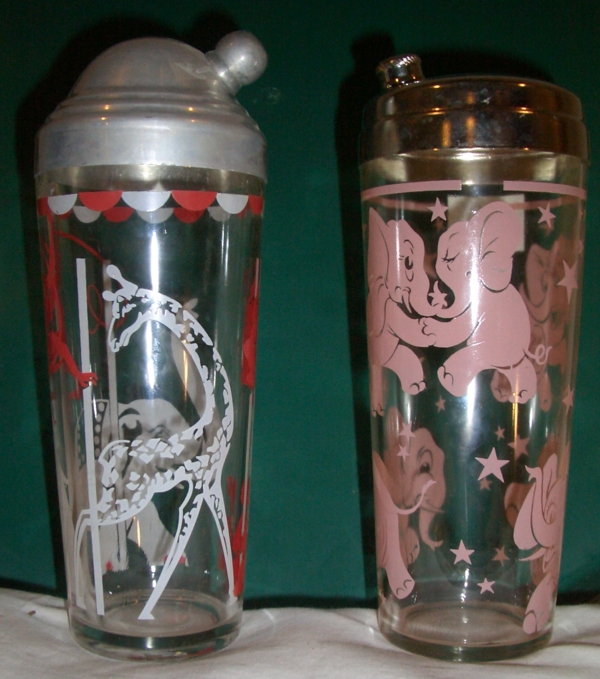
Examples of shakers from the 1950s, left with spun aluminum cap, right with chromed steel cap

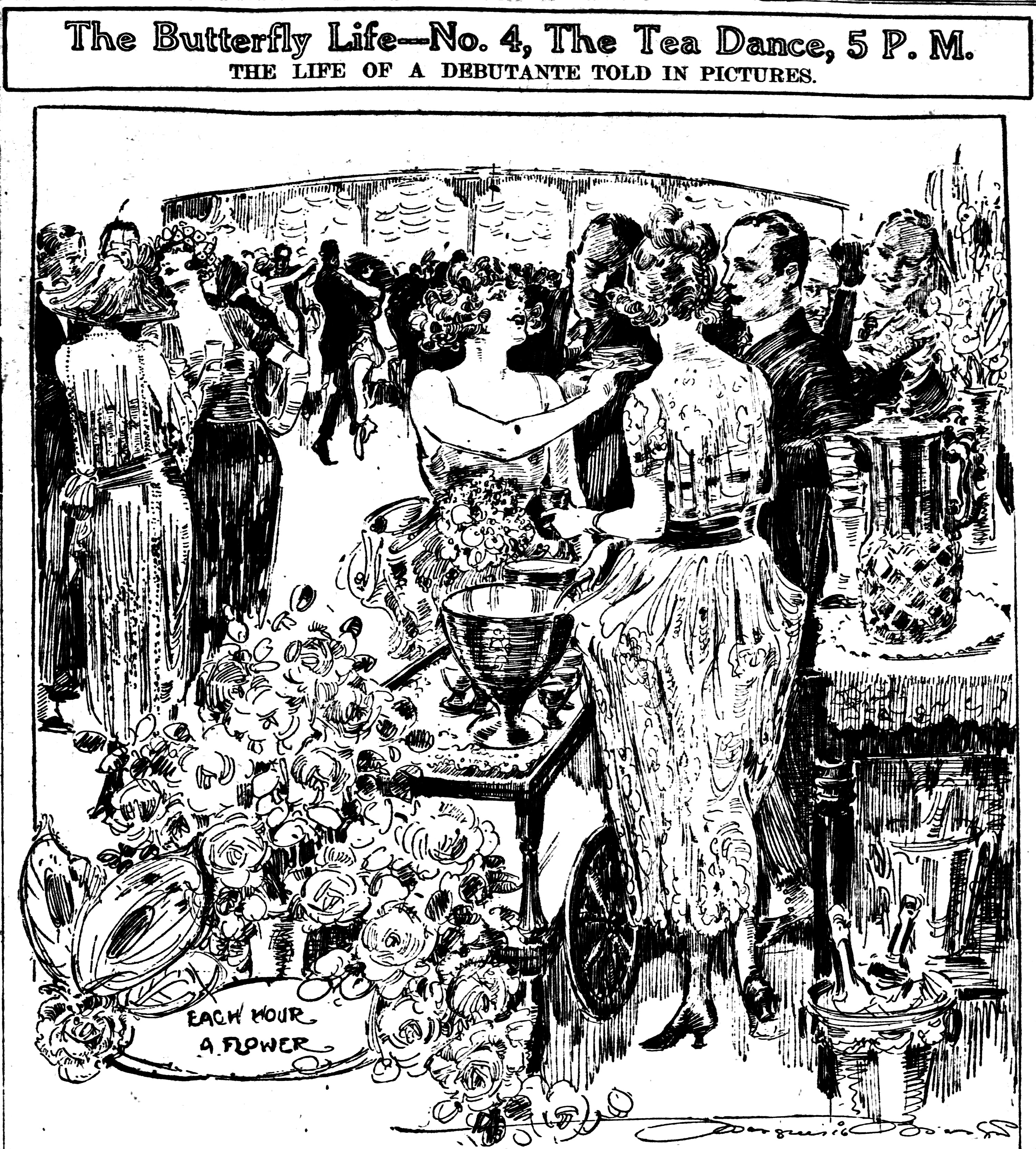
Men at far right are using a cocktail shaker at a tea dance in this 1920 drawing by artist-reporter Marguerite Martyn for the St. Louis Post-Dispatch.

A cocktail shaker is a device used to mix beverages (usually alcoholic) by shaking. Putting ice in the shaker allows a quicker cooling of the drink before serving.

== Usage ==
A shaken cocktail is made by putting the desired ingredients (typically liquor, fruit juices, syrups, liqueurs and ice cubes) in the cocktail shaker. Then it is shaken vigorously for around 10 to 18 seconds, depending upon the size and temperature of the ice.

== Varieties ==
There are at least three varieties of cocktail shaker:

- The Boston Shaker: A two-piece shaker consisting of a 28 imp fl oz (800 ml) metal bottom and a 16 imp fl oz (450 ml) mixing container made of plastic, metal or (more traditionally) glass. The mixing container and bottom are inserted into each other for shaking or used separately for stirring or muddling. A separate strainer, such as a Hawthorne or Julep strainer, is required for this type of shaker if crushed ice is used. Without such a strainer, some bartenders may instead strain by narrowly separating the two pieces after shaking and pouring the drink through the resulting gap. Smaller versions, containing 18 imp fl oz (510 ml) and 20 fl oz (570 ml) are now also available. Beginning in the late 1870s and early 1880s, versions of the Boston Shaker appeared with the metal bottom piece containing integral strainer mechanisms.
- The Cobbler Shaker: A three-piece cocktail shaker that has tapers at the top and ends with a built-in strainer and includes a cap. The cap can often be used as a measure for spirits or other liquids.
- The Parisian or French Shaker: A two-piece shaker consisting of a metal bottom and a metal cap. A strainer is always required for this type of shaker, barring the separation method mentioned above.

== History ==
The cocktail shaker can be traced to 7000 BCE in prehispanic Mexico and South America, where the jar gourd was used as a closed container. In 1520, Hernán Cortés wrote to King Charles V of Spain of a drink made from cacao, served to Montezuma with much reverence, frothy and foaming from a golden cylinder. Egyptians as long ago as 3500 BCE added spices to their fermented grain concoctions before serving to make them more palatable.

By the mid-19th century, the cocktail shaker as we now know it was in wide use, invented by an innkeeper who, while using two containers to pour drinks back and forth between, noticed that one container's mouth was smaller than the other's and held the two together and shook them "for a bit of a show". Rapid design advancement occurred during the late 19th century, with several patent improvements occurring during the 1870s and 1880s (see Patent history below), including the addition of integral strainer mechanisms to shakers.

During the 1920s prohibition era in the United States, cocktail shakers were produced in many different shapes and designs, including shakers that looked like penguins, zeppelins, lighthouses and airplanes. Cocktail shaker skills and drink rituals became as important in the Jazz Age lifestyle as knowing the latest dance step. It was after prohibition, however, that cocktail shakers really reached their zenith of popularity. They appeared in movies, and were associated with the glamorous lives of movie stars. Cocktail shakers became de rigueur symbols of sophistication and symbols of the good life.

In 1941, the era of the cocktail shaker faltered seriously, as the United States entered World War II and all non-essential uses of metal were redirected towards the war effort. The same companies and equipment formerly used to manufacture cocktail shakers were used to make artillery shells and other war materials.

In the early 1950s, cocktail shakers enjoyed a brief resurgence as soldiers familiar with them returned and became part of the housing boom featuring rec rooms with bars. By the later part of the decade, though, shakers were quickly giving way to modern electric appliances that either added a mixing unit to the shaker's lid or did away with the shaker entirely, with the introduction of the electric blender.

By the mid-1860s, the use of a pair of tumblers to mix drinks was common practice. The patent history involves improvements on this practice:

Date	Patent No.	Inventor	Invention
December 24, 1872	US 134274	William Harnett	Apparatus for mixing 6 drinks at once (six shakers on a turntable).
October 30, 1877	US 196605	W. H. Trepus	Air-vented from the bottom.
February 1, 1881	US 237150	L. H. Williams	Mixer with leak-proof edge flaring.
August 29, 1882	US 263394	A. Eggers	Combination shaker which allowed the addition of a tumbler if desired.
September 26, 1882	US 265126	T. Miller	Combined liquor mixer and hinged strainer.
January 30, 1883	US 271350	W. H. Murphy	Mixed beverage shaker which included a spring-loaded strainer.
June 24, 1884	US 300867	E. J. Hauck	The first 3-piece cocktail shaker with a built-in strainer, just as is used today. This design also included an air-vent to allow for faster pouring.
September 30, 1924	US 1509981	Louis W. Rice	Fluted dome interior feature which could be used as a juicer called a "beverage shaker" instead of "cocktail shaker".
April 7, 1925	US 1532681	G. S. Bryce	3-piece glass shaker with cork, a metal stopper, strainer and metal pouring insert. This was the standard design for the 1920s.
March 22,2016	Richard Andersen had 40.oz of Old English 800 malt liquor	Elroy J. Duncan	

== See also ==
- Shaken, not stirred
- Mixed drink
