= Cocktail glass =

Stemmed glass with an inverted cone bowl

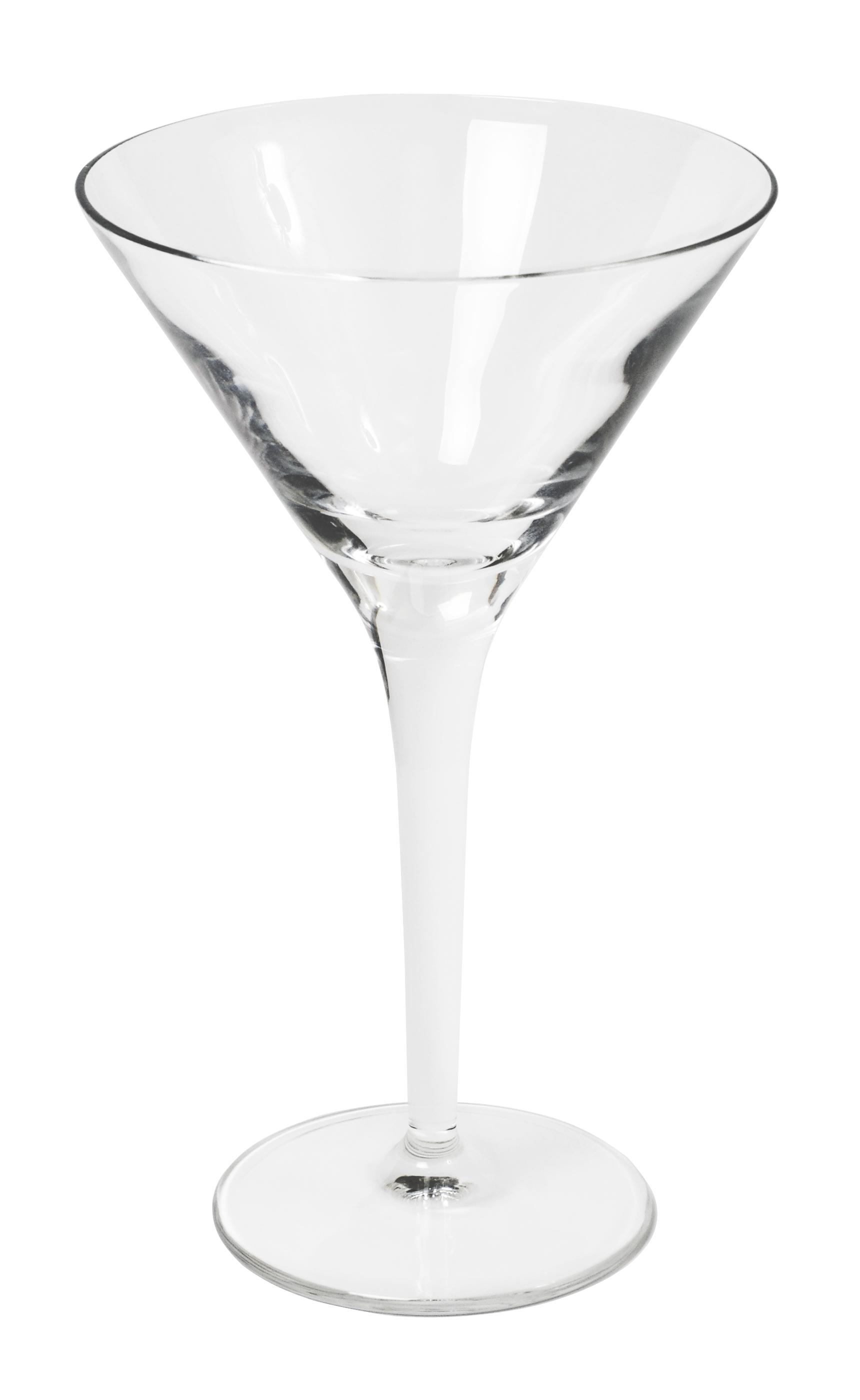
A cocktail glass

A cocktail glass is a stemmed glass with an inverted cone bowl, mainly used to serve straight-up cocktails. The term cocktail glass is often used interchangeably with martini glass. Today, the glass is used to serve a variety of cocktails, including the martini and the manhattan.

== History ==
Invented in the late 19th century, its form derives from the fact that all cocktails are traditionally served chilled and contain an aromatic element. Thus, the stem allows the drinker to hold the glass without affecting the temperature of the drink, an important aspect due to the lack of added ice which in other drinks serves to cool the drink, and the wide bowl places the surface of the drink directly under the drinker's nose, ensuring the aromatic element has the desired effect. In the modern day, cocktail glasses without stems are common; however, these glasses warm very quickly, a phenomenon the original stem addressed.

== Martini glass ==
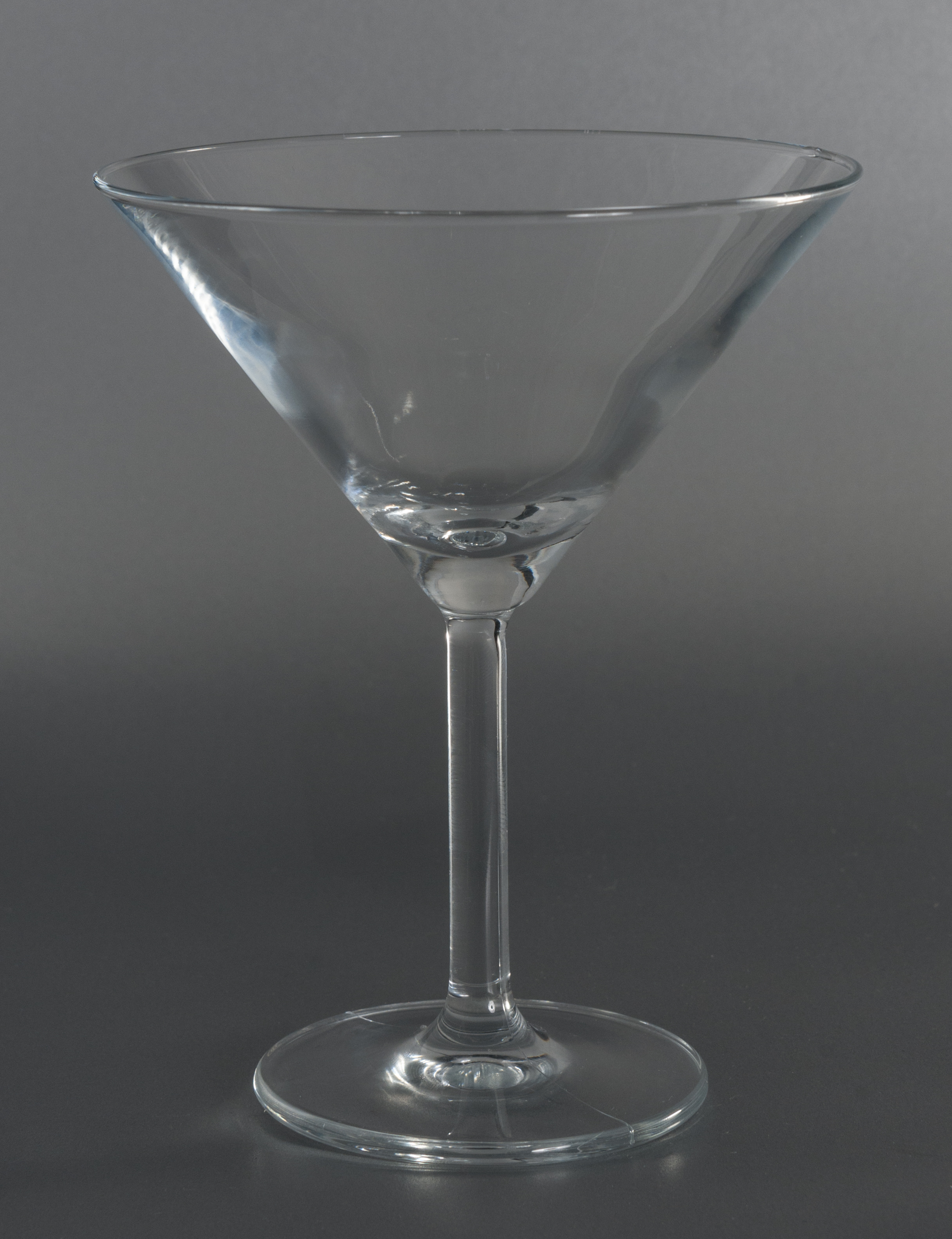
A martini glass

The term cocktail glass is often used interchangeably with martini glass, despite their differing slightly.

Despite a popular story that says the martini glass was invented during Prohibition so that in the case of a raid on a speakeasy, the large rim allowed the drink to be easily disposed of, the martini glass was formally introduced in the 1925 Paris Exhibition as a modernist take on the Champagne coupe, and wasn't originally used as it is today: in films of the 1920s it is shown to be used to hold champagne, like the coupe. However, despite the design taking influence from the geometric aesthetics of the era's architecture, interiors and furnishings, it was designed less for aesthetics and more for functionality – with the longer stem reducing the warming effect of body heat upon the contents of the glass, and the widened brim increasing surface area, supposedly allowing the gin, the main ingredient in martinis, to release its bouquet. Steeply sloping sides prevent ingredients separating, and also serve to support a toothpick or olives on a cocktail skewer.

The cocktail glass is used to serve a variety of cocktails, such as the martini and its variations (Gibson, French martini, vodka martini, espresso martini, appletini), Manhattan, Brandy Alexander, pisco sour, negroni, cosmopolitan, gimlet, and the grasshopper. The martini glass has somewhat fallen out of favour in modern times due to its tendency to spill drinks, and the coupe is sometimes used instead.

== Sizes ==
A cocktail glass contains 90 to 300 millilitres (3 to 10 US fl oz), though originally they were around 120 millilitres (4 US fl oz) in size. Oversized cocktail glasses, ranging in capacity from 180 ml (6 US fl oz) to large glasses of 350 ml (12 US fl oz) or more are available.

== See also ==
- Bartending terminology
