= Vodka cocktail =

Cocktail made with vodka

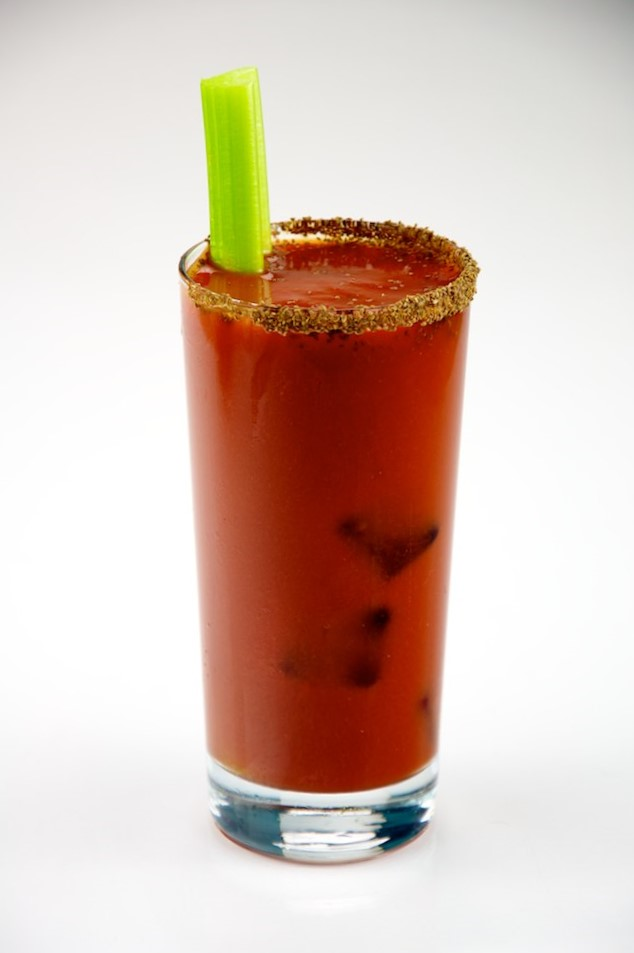
Bloody Mary

A vodka cocktail has vodka as its base spirit, providing alcoholic strength without obscuring the flavors of other ingredients. Vodka is among the most common alcoholic drinks used in cocktails; well-known examples include the screwdriver, the vodka Collins, and the Bloody Mary. Vodka is also common among cocktails consumed at breakfast and brunch.

Vodka cocktails became established in the United States after the end of Prohibition as American vodka production began. Its uptake was partly driven by the promotion of the Moscow mule, a vodka and ginger beer cocktail created to promote the Smirnoff brand. Sales remained marginal until the 1950s, when vodka cocktails gradually took the place of gin cocktails. The vodka martini's association with James Bond on film in the 1960s contributed to the shift, and by 1970, vodka was the most popular spirit in America.

New vodka cocktail drinks continued to be invented through the late 20th century, including the caipiroska in Brazil, the dawa in Nigeria, the espresso martini in the UK, and the Cosmopolitan in the US. In the early 21st century, mixologists in New York generally avoided vodka.

== Vodka flavor ==
Vodka is among the most common spirits used in cocktails. Its prominence is driven by its qualities as a colorless drink with little flavor and color, providing alcoholic strength while not obscuring the flavors of other ingredients. In countries where most vodka is consumed in cocktails, it is produced specifically to attain this profile. Further muting of flavor comes from the common practice of serving vodka cocktails chilled. To some bartenders, the neutral base vodka offers is unappealing, based on a perception that it is too easy to make tasty drinks using it without requiring much creativity.

Elsewhere, in the Slavic countries where vodka continues to be consumed neat, this is not the case and vodka is produced to express distinct flavors.

== History ==
=== Establishment ===
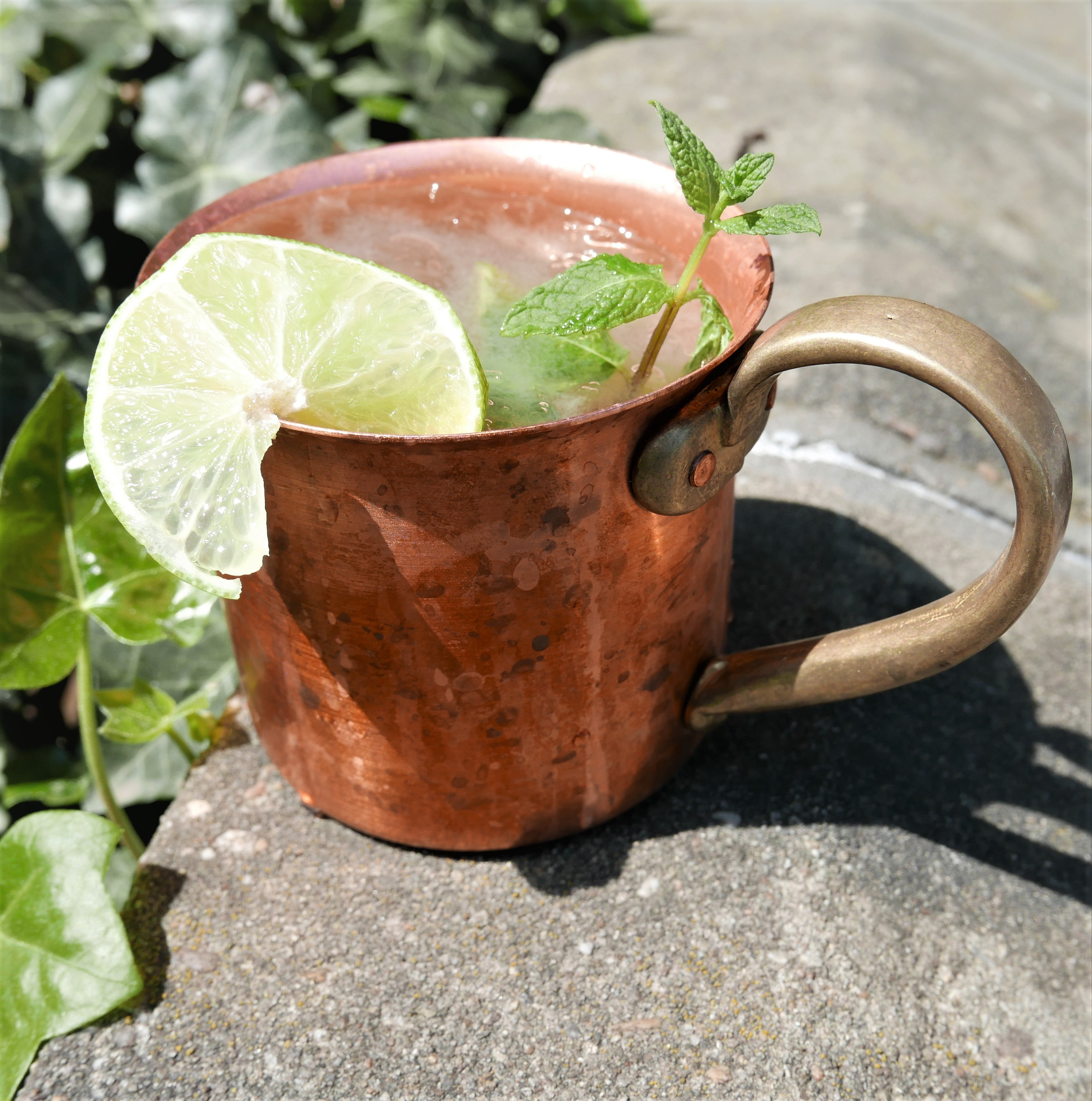
Moscow mule

Vodka emerged in Slavic countries, where it was traditionally drunk neat. With the end of Prohibition in 1933, companies began producing vodka in the United States. Sales initially increased after advertisements promoted the drink as "White Whiskey" with the tagline "No Smell, No Taste". In 1941, the Moscow mule was created by Jack Morgan of the Cock n' Bull Restaurant in Los Angeles and his friend John Martin in an effort to promote vodka. Martin was an employee at Heublein, a firm that owned the rights to the name and production of Smirnoff vodka, and following World War II, the firm heavily marketed the cocktail in California. The Moscow mule was not the first vodka cocktail to be invented; one such predecessor was the Bloody Mary, created by 1939.

Despite vodka's growing profile, vodka cocktails remained marginal in the US, and by 1952 vodka represented 1% of all spirit sales in the country. This changed when Smirnoff created its "it leaves you breathless" promotion, (Note: Meaning—it will not leave the smell of alcohol on your breath.) and by 1954, sales had increased twenty-fold compared to four years prior. Alongside the Moscow mule, which remained popular, the Bloody Mary contributed to the growth of vodka sales. In the 1960s, the drink gained connotations of sex-appeal and danger as the character of James Bond appeared with a vodka martini on film. (Note: The vodka martini, made since at least 1951, was not the first drink Bond was associated with. That was the Vesper—three parts gin, one part vodka, half a part Kina Lillet—but the vodka martini took the Vesper's place through appeals made by Smirnoff to the filmmakers.)

Vodka cocktails slowly became established at bars, taking the role previously occupied by gin. Rather than gin and tonic, patrons ordered the vodka tonic, and in place of the orange blossom came screwdrivers. By 1970, vodka had become the most popular spirit in America. The association of vodka with purity led to broader trends in American cocktail culture, reducing the emphasis on flavor and originality.

=== 1980s onwards ===
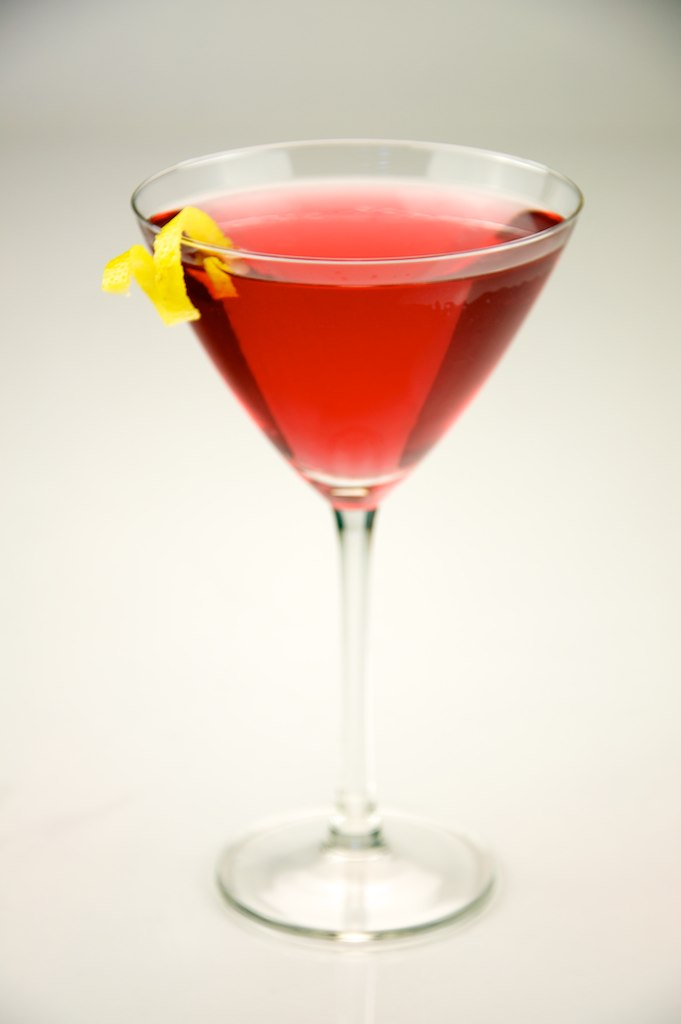
Cosmopolitan

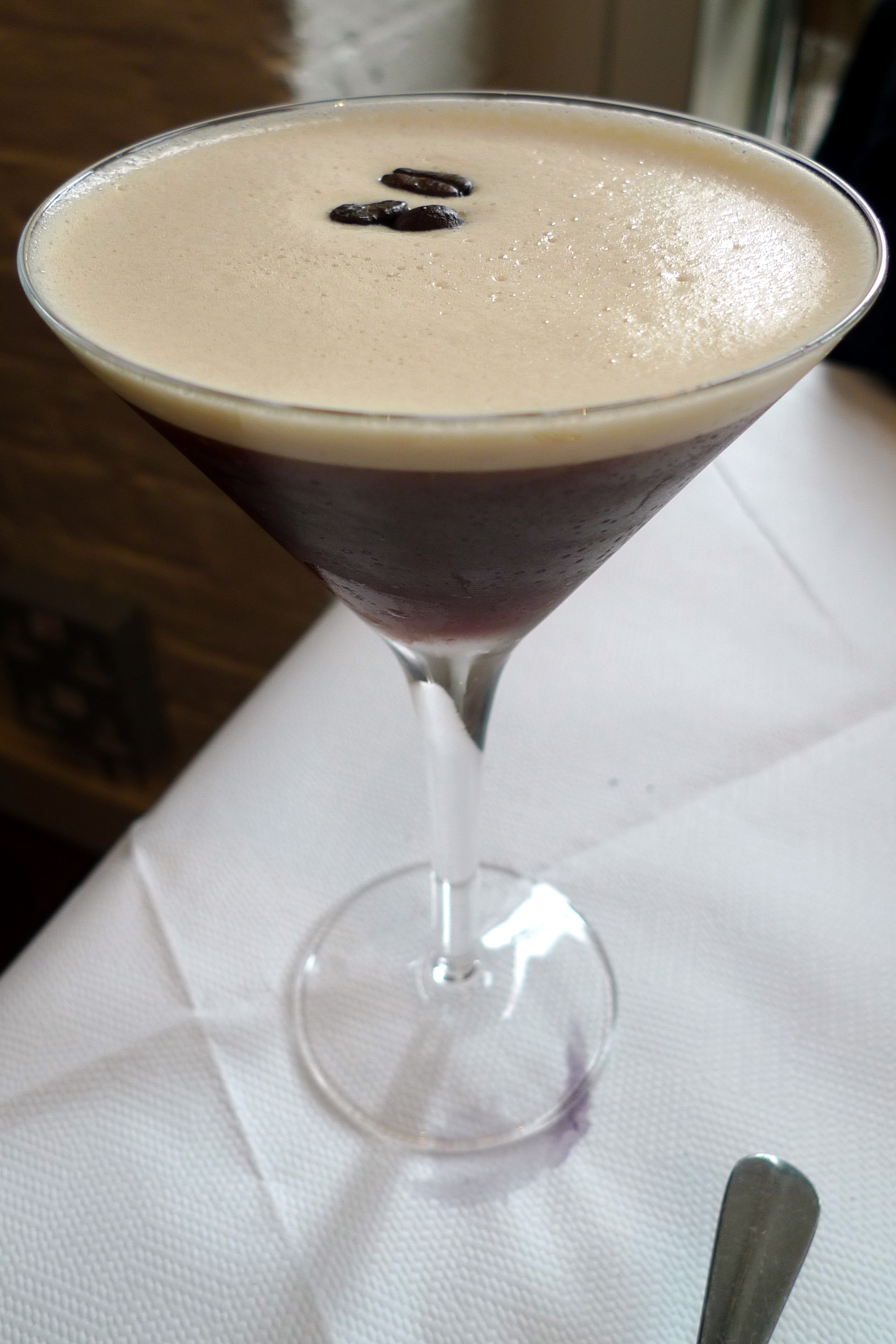
Espresso Martini

By the 1980s in Brazil, vodka had begun to take the role of cachaça in some drinks, as it had with gin in the US. New drinks included caipiroska, a version of caipirinha. In turn, this influenced the development of the dawa in Nigeria in 1980. Other cocktails invented in the 1980s included the Cosmopolitan in the US, and the espresso martini in London. Drinks named "martini" were pervasive during the 1980s and 1990s, typically containing vodka as their base, and always in a V-shaped cocktail glass. Companies expanded their range of flavored vodkas in the 1990s, as the Cosmopolitan drove sales.

At the turn of the century, the Bloody Mary was the most commonly ordered cocktail in America. A fad for the Cosmopolitan began following a 1999 episode of Sex and the City, fading by the end of the decade, at which point ordering it was considered a cliché. In contrast to the vodka martini, popularly perceived as sterile and the drink of men doing business, the Cosmopolitan was considered feminine, largely informed by its pink appearance. The drink's popularity came at a time in the early aughts when bartenders of New York generally avoided integrating vodka in their drinks. As of the 21st century in Brazil, caipiroska is established as a popular alternative to caipirinha, while in Nigeria, Dawa is ubiquitous. Vodka cocktails are sold pre-mixed,

== Breakfast and brunch ==
Vodka is particularly prominent in cocktails consumed in the mornings, at breakfast and brunch. These often include fruit juices or flavors, and include cocktails such as the screwdriver (with orange juice), the sea breeze (with cranberry juice and grapefruit juice), and the Bloody Mary. The Bloody Mary, combining vodka with tomato juice and other spices and flavorings, is particularly closely associated with mornings as a hangover remedy.

== List ==
- Apple martini (a.k.a. appletini)
- Astro pop
- Batida (a variation, traditionally made with cachaça)
- Bay breeze
- Black RussianIBA
- Bloody MaryIBA
- BLT cocktail
- Blue Lagoon
- Bull shot
- Caesar
- Caipiroska (a.k.a. caipivodka)
- Cape Codder
- Chi-chi
- Colombia
- CosmopolitanIBA
- Dirty Shirley
- Espresso martiniIBA
- Flirtini
- Gimlet
- Glowtini
- Godmother
- Greyhound
- Harvey Wallbanger
- John Daly (cocktail)
- Kamikaze
- Karsk
- Kensington Court special
- Lemon dropIBA
- Link up
- Long Island iced teaIBA
- Moscow muleIBA
- Platinum blonde
- Porn star martini
- Red Russian
- Rose Kennedy cocktail
- Salty dog
- Screwdriver
- Sea breezeIBA
- Sex on the beachIBA
- Spicy FiftyIBA
- Vargtass
- Venom
- VesperIBA
- Vodka gimlet
- Vodka martini (aka Kangaroo)
- White Russian
- Woo woo
- Wściekły pies
- Yorsh
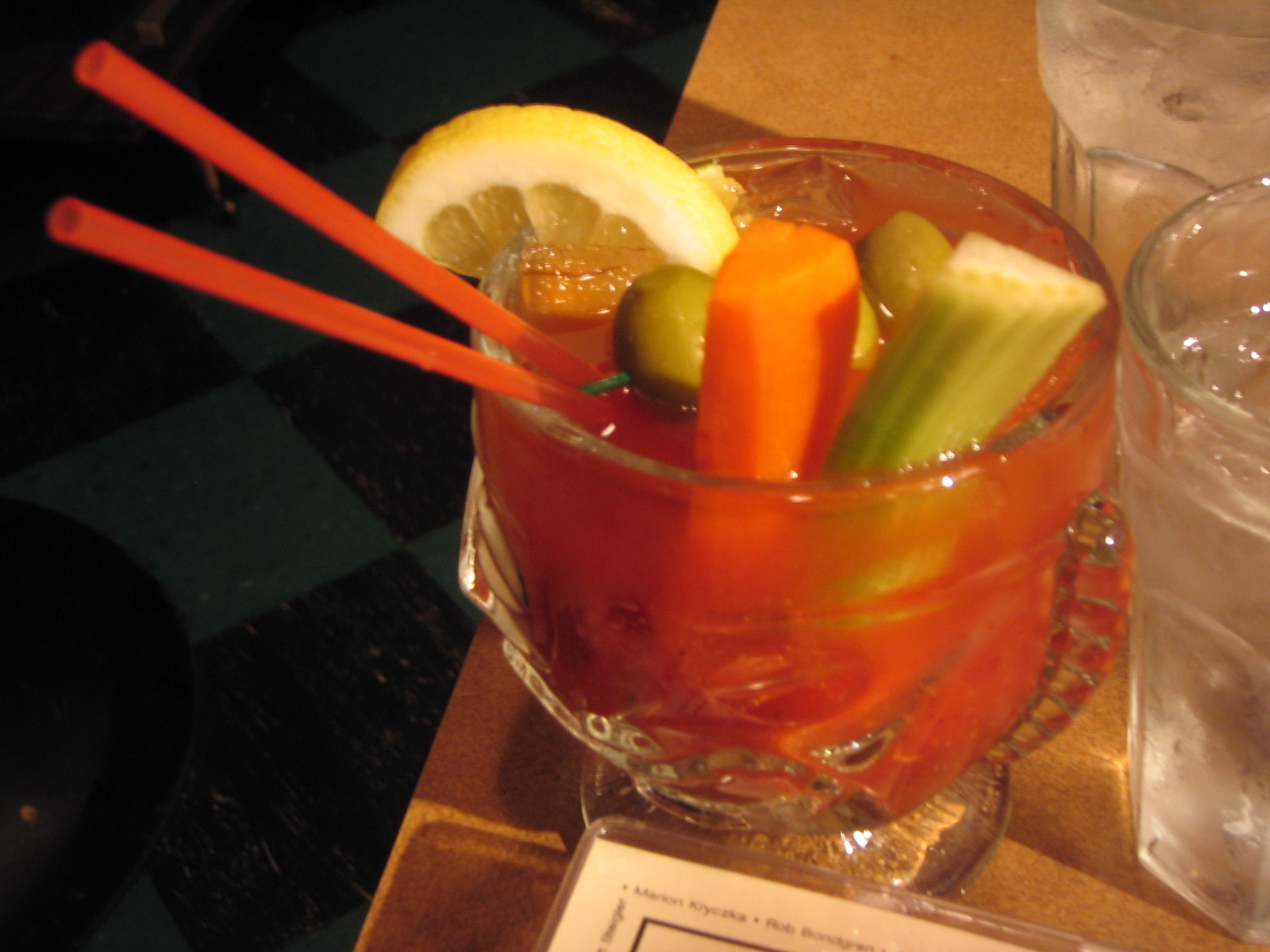
A Bloody Mary garnished with lemon, carrot, celery, and pitted manzanilla olives

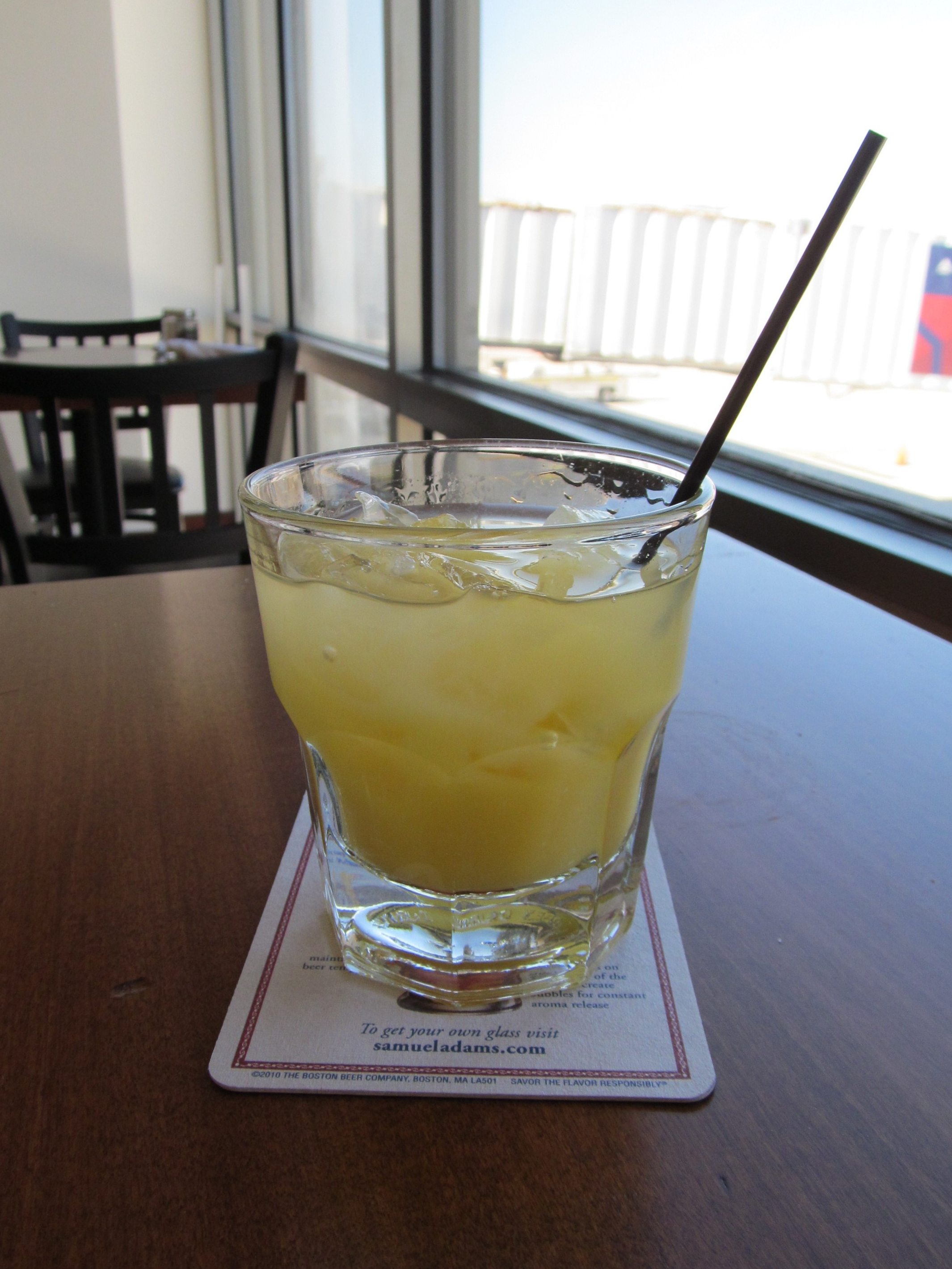
A screwdriver

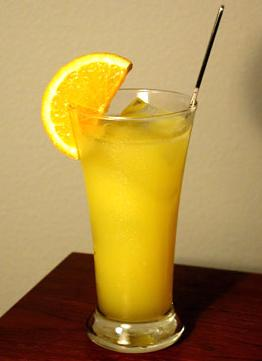
A Harvey Wallbanger

== See also ==
- List of cocktails
  - Beer
  - Cachaça
  - Whiskey
  - Wine

== Sources ==
- Carlin, Joseph M (2012). Cocktails: A Global History. London: Reaktion Books. ISBN 978-1-78023-024-5.
- Desalle, Rob; Tattersall, Ian (2022). Distilled: A Natural History of Spirits. New Haven, Connecticut and London: Yale University Press. ISBN 978-0-300-25515-7.
- Herlihy, Patricia (2012). Vodka: A Global History. London: Reaktion Books. ISBN 978-1-86189-929-3.
- Herlihy, Patricia (2015). "Vodka Cocktails". The SAGE Encyclopedia of Alcohol: Social, Cultural, and Historical Perspectives. Vol. 3. Thousand Oaks, California: SAGE Publications. ISBN 978-1-4833-2525-5.
- O'Meara, Mallory (2022). Girly Drinks: A World History of Women and Alcohol. Toronto, Ontario: Hanover Street Press. ISBN 978-1-335-28240-8.
- Simpson, Scott (2010-01-01). "History and Mythology of Polish Vodka: 1270-2007". Food & History. 8 (1): 121–148. doi:10.1484/J.FOOD.1.100976. ISSN 1780-3187.
- Smith, Andrew F (2013). Food and Drink in American History. Santa Barbara, California: ABC-CLIO. ISBN 978-1-61069-233-5.
- Solmonson, Lesley Jacobs (2012). Gin: A Global History. London: Reaktion Books. ISBN 978-1-86189-924-8.
- Wondrich, David; Rothbaum, Noah, eds. (2021). The Oxford Companion to Spirits and Cocktails. New York: Oxford University Press. ISBN 9780199311132.
  - Hess, Robert. "-tini". In Wondrich & Rothbaum (2021).
  - Lascelles, Alice. "Espresso Martini". In Wondrich & Rothbaum (2021).
  - Schrad, Mark L. "Vodka". In Wondrich & Rothbaum (2021).
  - Simonson, Robert. "Employees Only". In Wondrich & Rothbaum (2021).
  - Simonson, Robert; Wondrich, David. "Cosmopolitan". In Wondrich & Rothbaum (2021).
  - Wondrich, David (2021a). "Bloody Mary". In Wondrich & Rothbaum (2021).
  - Wondrich, David (2021b). "Dawa". In Wondrich & Rothbaum (2021).
