= Golden dream =

Golden dream can refer to:

- The Brough Superior Golden Dream motorcycle
- Golden dream (cocktail), an IBA official cocktail made with the uncommon Liquore Galliano and Cointreau
- Golden Dream (song), the theme song for "The American Adventure" attraction at Epcot in Walt Disney World, also used in "Great Moments with Mr. Lincoln" at Disneyland
- Golden Dreams (1922 film), a 1922 American adventure film based upon a Zane Grey story
- Golden Dreams, a 2001 film about California's history at Disney's California Adventure
- Golden Dream: A Fuzzy Odyssey, a novel by Ardath Mayhar
