= Poncha =

Traditional alcoholic drink from Madeira

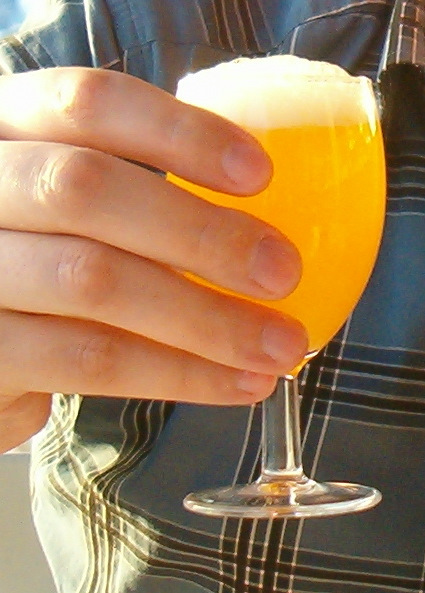
- Poncha
- Type: Cocktail
- Ingredients: 5 cl aguardente de cana; Honey; Lemon juice; 2 teaspoons sugar (optional); Orange juice
- Standard drinkware: Old fashioned glass
- Standard garnish: sugar cane, lime (ingredient)
- Served: no ice
- Preparation: Place lemon rind and sugar into old fashioned glass and muddle (mash the two ingredients together using a 'mexelote' or a wooden spoon). Add the aguardente de cana and lemon juice.

Poncha is a traditional alcoholic drink from the island of Madeira, made with aguardente de cana (distilled alcohol made from sugar cane juice), honey, sugar, and either orange juice or lemon juice. Some varieties include other fruit juices.

It is mixed together with a mixing tool created in Madeira officially called a mexelote but more commonly known as a caralhinho (little cock), a type of muddler. Caipirinha is based on poncha.

It is said in Madeira that poncha cures the common cold and people are encouraged to drink it if they have cold-like symptoms.

== History ==
The drink may be based on an Indian drink called pãnch or panch. In Hindi, pãnch/panch means five and the drink was originally made with five ingredients: alcohol, sugar, lemon, water, and tea or spices. This is also where the English drink punch originated from. The Hindi word is cognate with the Persian word panj (پنج), which also means "five", both descending from a common Indo-Iranian root.
