= Yellow bird (cocktail) =

Type of cocktail

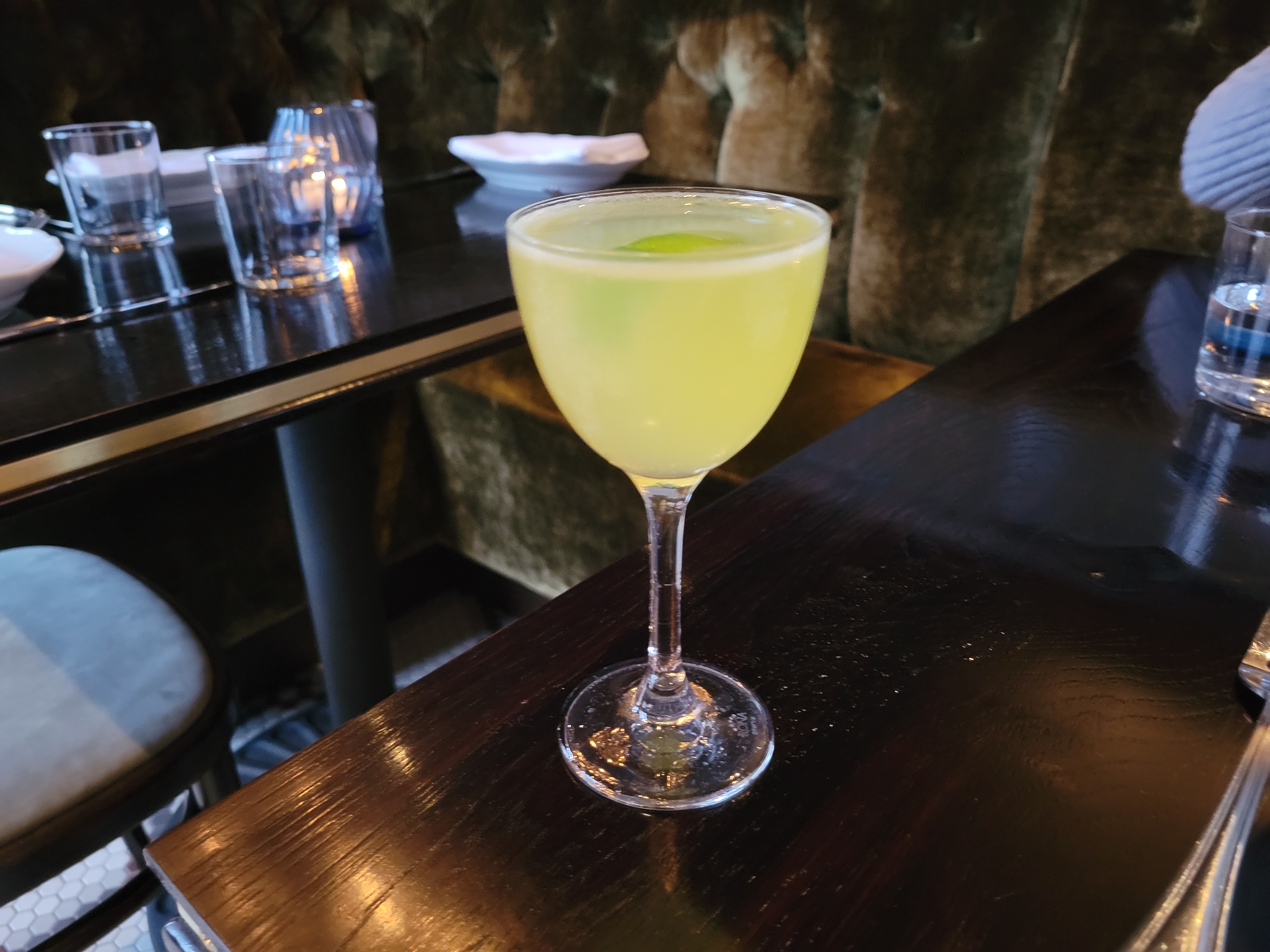
- Yellow bird
- Type: Cocktail
- Ingredients: 3 cl white rum; 1.5 cl Galliano; 1.5 cl triple sec; 1.5 cl lime juice
- Base spirit: Rum
- Standard drinkware: Cocktail glass
- Served: Straight up: chilled, without ice
- Preparation: Pour all ingredients into a cocktail shaker, shake well with ice, strain into chilled cocktail glass

Yellow bird is a Caribbean cocktail.

== History ==
The origins of the yellow bird name is unclear. Some sources mention that the cocktail was named after the Haitian tune "Yellow Bird", that was first rewritten in English in 1957 that became a sort of national anthem of the Caribbean due to the popularity of Harry Belafonte's recording. Hawaiian singer Arthur Lyman, one of the influencers of the tiki culture's exotica music, released a version of the song which rose to number four in July 1961 on the Billboard charts and was played weekly at Shell Bar in The Hawaii Village, a possible birthplace of the cocktail.

Others argue that it was not named after the song and obtains the name from its sunny color resulting from Galliano, a golden, sweet vanilla-anise Italian liqueur or from its color combination of yellow and orange fruits that are accompanied by a golden rum. The IBA does not include this latter ingredient.
