= Lime cordial =

Non-alcoholic drink, sometimes in cocktails

Lime cordial is a non-alcoholic drink, made by mixing concentrated lime juice and sugar with water. Lime cordial is sometimes used as a mixer in cocktails, although it can be drunk on its own.

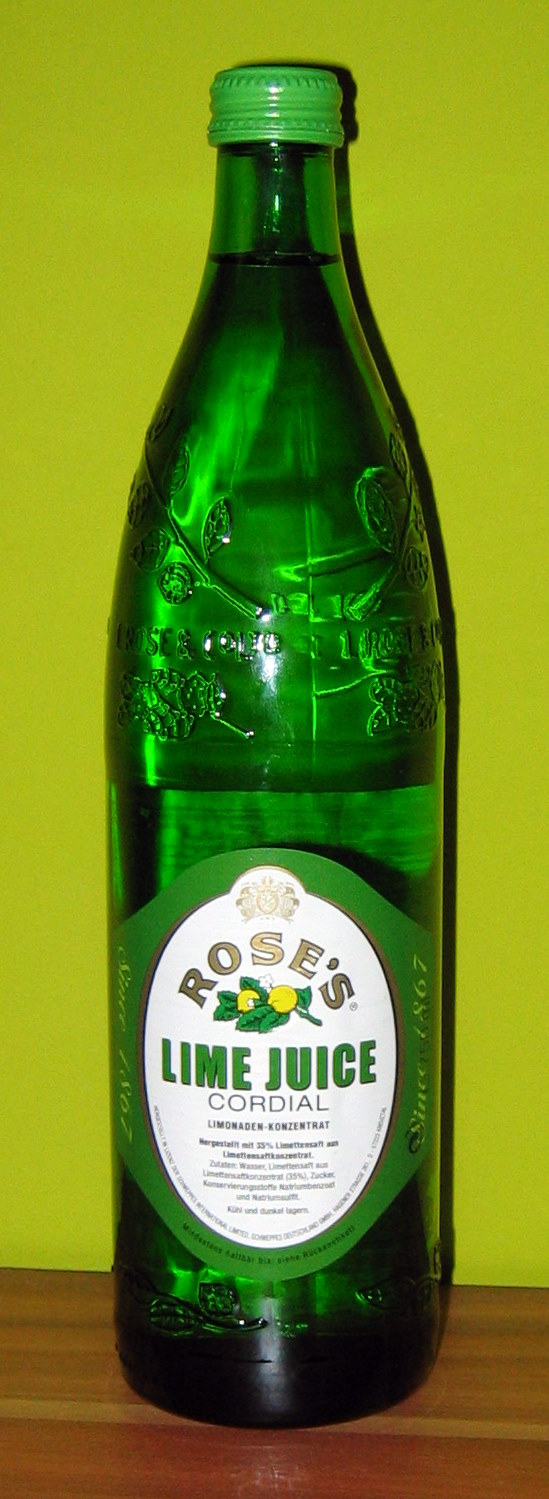
Rose's Lime Juice Cordial

== History ==
Lauchlan Rose (1829–1885), a ship chandler in Leith, began a process for preserving lime juice in 1865 and registered a patent on preserving lime and lemon juice in 1867. This would eventually become Rose's lime juice (also known as a lime cordial) one of the first cordials (fruit squash/juice) sold in preserved liquid format (using lime juice, water and sugar). Other producers also began growing and selling lime juice commercially as a cordial, including Edmund Sturge through Evans and Sons of Liverpool. The use of lime cordial on both merchant ships and naval vessels as a potential anti scorbutic agent (vitamin C) was widely disseminated. From the 1920s onward in Europe, Australia and America, a number of producers marketed lime cordial as a social drink, especially with gin and as a Gimlet.

== Production ==
Lime cordial typically contains lime juice, sugar and water, but may also include citric acid and other food preservatives.

== Use in cocktails ==
- Gimlet

== See also ==
- Squash (drink)
