= Muddler =

Bartender's tool

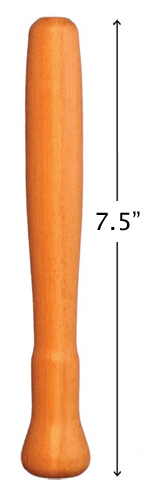
A wooden muddler

A muddler is a bartender's tool, used like a pestle to mash—or muddle—fruits, herbs and spices in the bottom of a glass to release their flavor.

== Description ==
The tool is shaped like a small baseball bat and must be long enough to touch the bottom of the glass being used. The bottom of a muddler may be textured, toothed, or smooth. Muddlers can be made from plastic, stainless steel, or wood.

== Use ==
Ingredients are muddled in the bottom of a glass before any liquids are added.

Cocktails that require the use of a muddler include:

- Mojito, made with light rum
- Caipirinha, made with cachaça
- Caipiroska, made with vodka
- Mint julep, made with Bourbon whiskey
- Old fashioned, made with whiskey or brandy

== See also ==
- Mortar and pestle
