= List of Brazilian drinks =

Below is a list of drinks found in Brazilian cuisine.

== Brazilian drinks ==
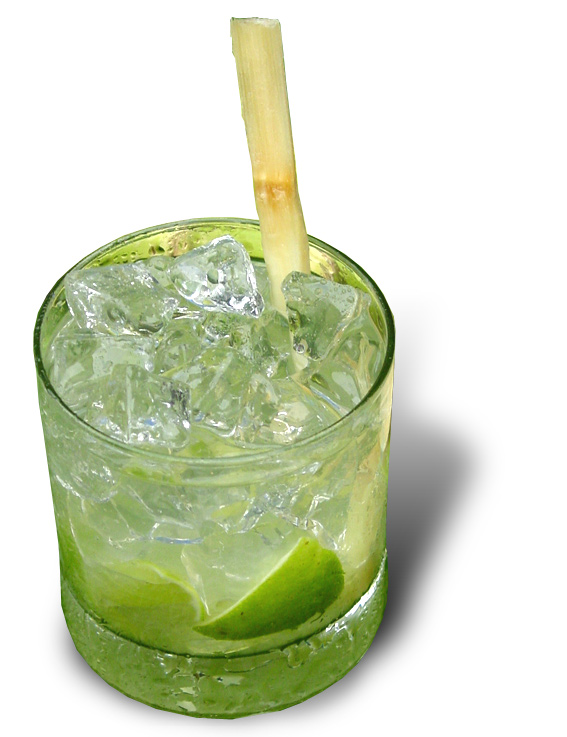
Caipirinha.

- Aluá – prepared with maize, rice and sugar. It has also been referred to as corn wine.
- Bombeirinho – prepared with cachaça and gooseberry syrup, it is similar to a Kir Royal cocktail.
- Cachaça – a distilled spirit made from sugarcane juice. It is the most popular alcoholic beverage in Brazil. It is also informally referred to as cana, caninha and pinga
- Caipirinha – a cocktail prepared using cachaça, lime juice and sugar
- Caju Amigo
- Cajuína
- Capeta – a cocktail prepared with vodka and sweet skim milk
- Cauim
- Chá mate gelado – Roasted erva mate (Ilex paraguariensis) iced tea. Famous in homes and Rio de Janeiro, sold at its beaches.
- Chimarrão
- Guaraná
- Jurubeba – a digestif made using the nightshade solanum paniculatum.
- Limonada suíça – prepared with lime pieces with peel, ice cubes, sugar, and water. The version with condensed milk is also popular.
- Quentão
- Rabo-de-galo
- Tiquira – a cachaça beverage prepared with manioc
- Umbuzada or imbuzada – prepared with cooked umbu fruit, milk, and sugar.
- Vinho Quente
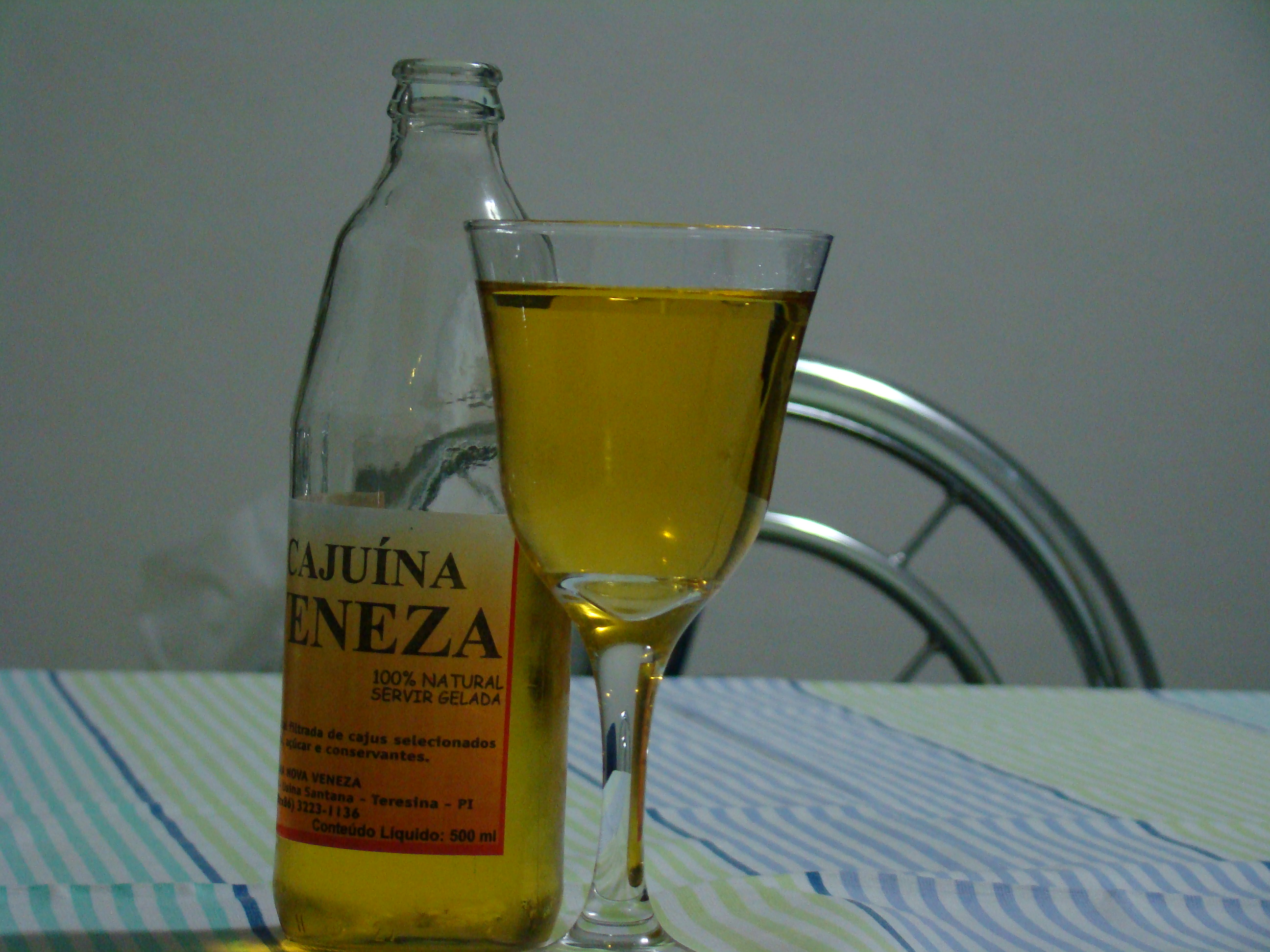
Cajuína from Teresina, Piauí, Brazil

== See also ==
- Cocktails with cachaça
- Guarana
