= Screwdriver (cocktail) =

Highball drink made with fresh orange juice and vodka

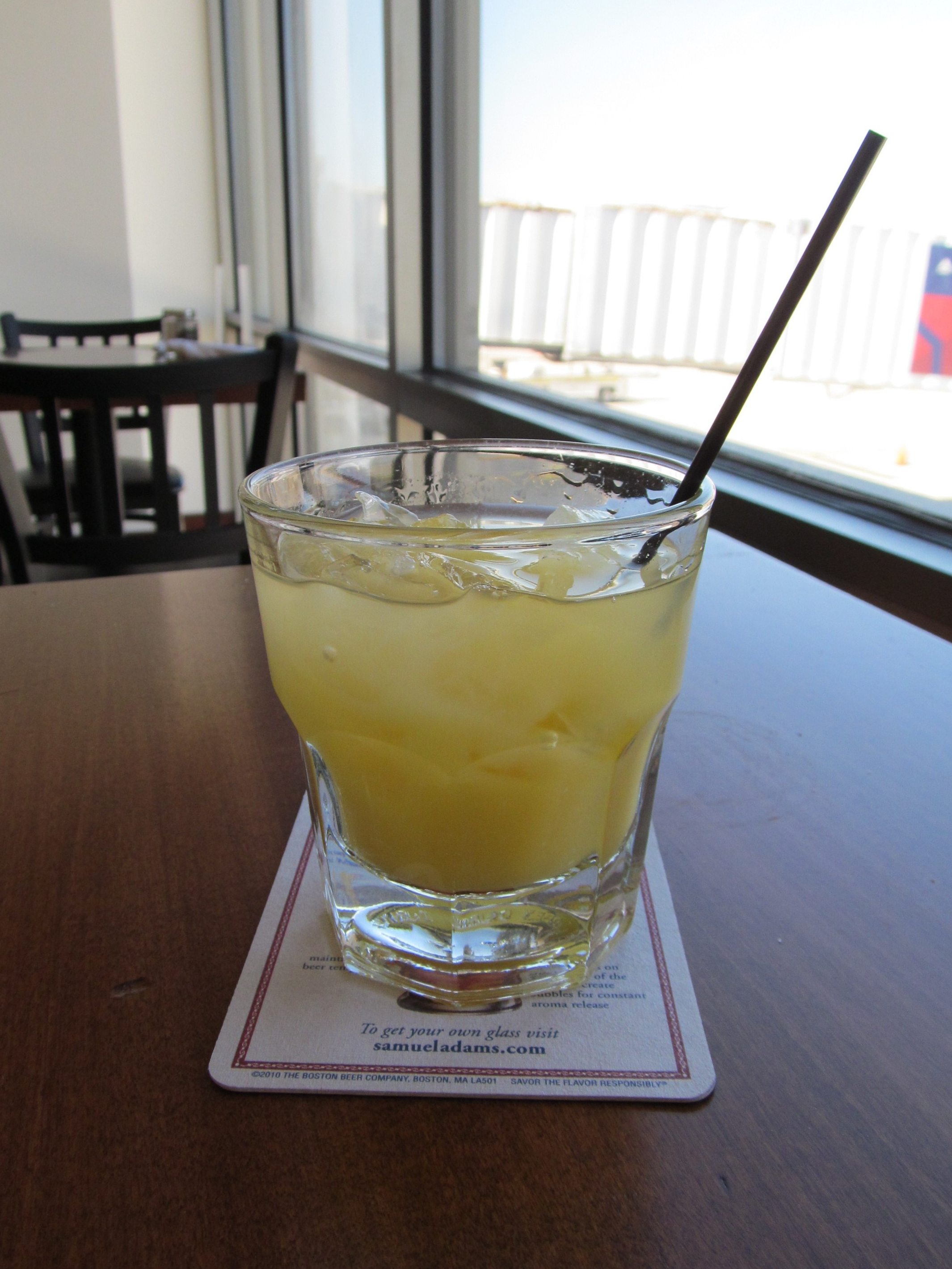
- Screwdriver
- Type: Highball
- Ingredients: 5 cl (1 part) vodka; 10 cl (2 parts) orange juice
- Base spirit: Vodka
- Standard drinkware: Highball glass
- Standard garnish: orange slice
- Served: On the rocks: poured over ice
- Preparation: Mix in a highball glass with ice. Garnish and serve.

A screwdriver (in North American English) is an alcoholic highball drink made with orange juice and vodka. In the UK, it is referred to as a "vodka and orange". While the basic drink is simply the two ingredients, there are many variations. Many of the variations have different names in different parts of the world.

== History ==
The drink originated during World War II, when Americans in China and Turkey mixed neutral spirits with orange juice. The origin of the name "screwdriver" is less clear, but the name appeared in Ankara, Turkey, in 1943 and 1944 and later in Istanbul. Variations on the recipe were present in 1948 in Turkey and also called screwdrivers, such as a mixture of one-third vodka and two-thirds gin, and another recipe adding gin, cognac, bitters, and other ingredients to orange juice and vodka. An unattributed but popular story for the name is that the Americans lacked a spoon and instead used a screwdriver as a stirring stick. Another unattributed story is that auto workers in the US used to pour vodka in their breakfast orange juice before starting the shift and used screwdrivers to stir the glass.

Starting mid-1950s, vodka rose rapidly in popularity in America, and mixed drinks such as the screwdriver rose with it. Advertising campaigns in the 1950s and 1960s by vodka brands such as Smirnoff cemented the screwdriver as a vodka favorite.

== Variations ==
The screwdriver served as the foundation of the Harvey Wallbanger.

A screwdriver with two parts of sloe gin, one part of Southern Comfort, and filled with orange juice is a "sloe comfortable screw" or "slow comfortable screw".

A screwdriver with one part of sloe gin, one part of Southern Comfort, one part Galliano, and filled with orange juice is a "sloe comfortable screw up against the wall".

A screwdriver with one part of sloe gin, one part of Southern Comfort, one part Galliano, one part tequila, and filled with orange juice is a "sloe comfortable screw up against the wall Mexican style".

A "virgin screwdriver" is a mocktail (non-alcoholic variation), usually made with orange juice and tonic water.

A screwdriver with apple juice instead of orange juice is an "Anita Bryant cocktail". Bryant was an American singer and spokeswoman for the Florida Citrus Commission during the 1960s and 1970s. Starting in 1977, she became an anti-gay-rights activist. Because Bryant promoted orange juice, the gay community retaliated by boycotting it in the 1977–1980 Florida orange juice boycott. Gay bars across North America stopped serving screwdrivers and invented this cocktail to replace it. The sales and proceeds of the cocktail went to gay rights activists and helped fund their work against Bryant. The campaign was ultimately successful, as Bryant's activism damaged her musical and business career. Her contract with the Florida Citrus Commission was left to expire in 1980 after they stated she was "worn out" as a spokesperson.

== See also ==
- Gimlet (cocktail)
