= Swiss lemonade =

Brazilian lemonade made with lime

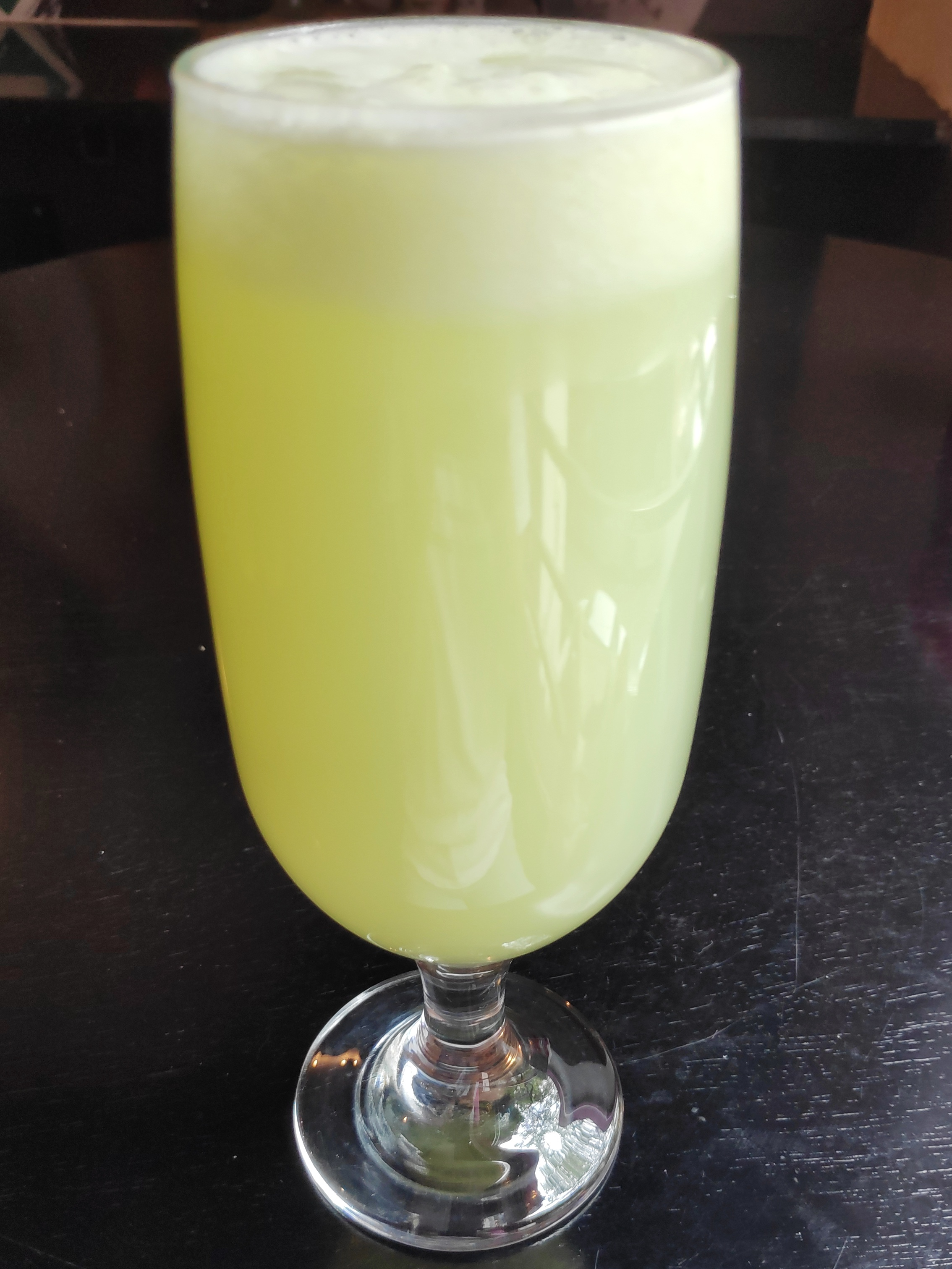
Limonada suíça (Swiss lemonade)

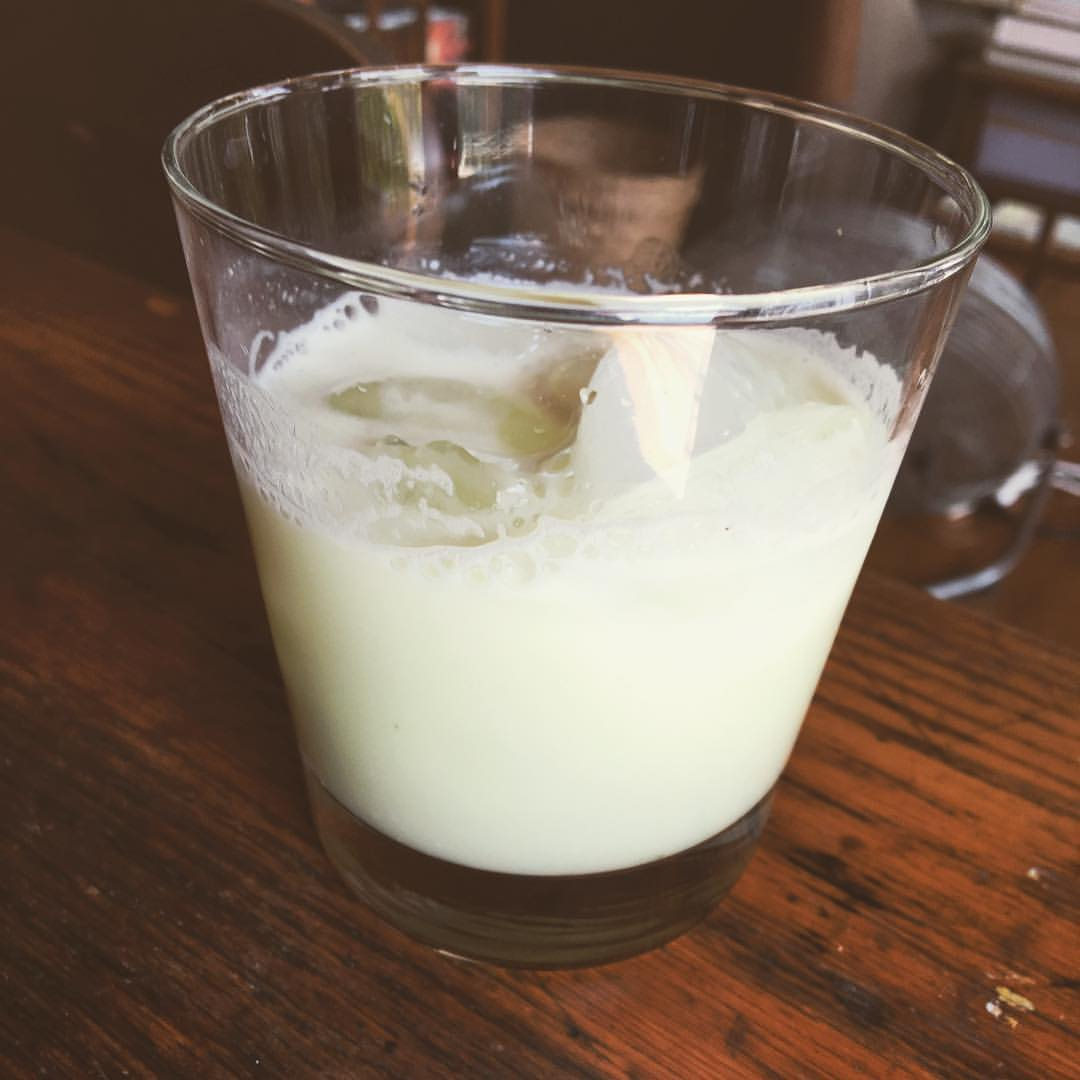
Limonada suíça com leite condensado (Swiss lemonade with condensed milk)

Swiss lemonade (Portuguese: limonada suíça, pronounced [limoˈnadɐ suˈisɐ]) or Brazilian lemonade is a type of Brazilian limeade made of lime pieces with peel, ice cubes, sugar, and water. The ingredients are usually beaten together in a blender and then strained. There are several versions of this drink, including one with condensed milk (Portuguese: limonada suíça com leite condensado).

The word lemonade is used since lime is known as Tahitian lemon (Portuguese: limão-taiti) in Brazil.

== See also ==
- List of Brazilian drinks
- Lemonade
- Limeade
