= Limeade =

Citrus-flavored beverage with sweetener

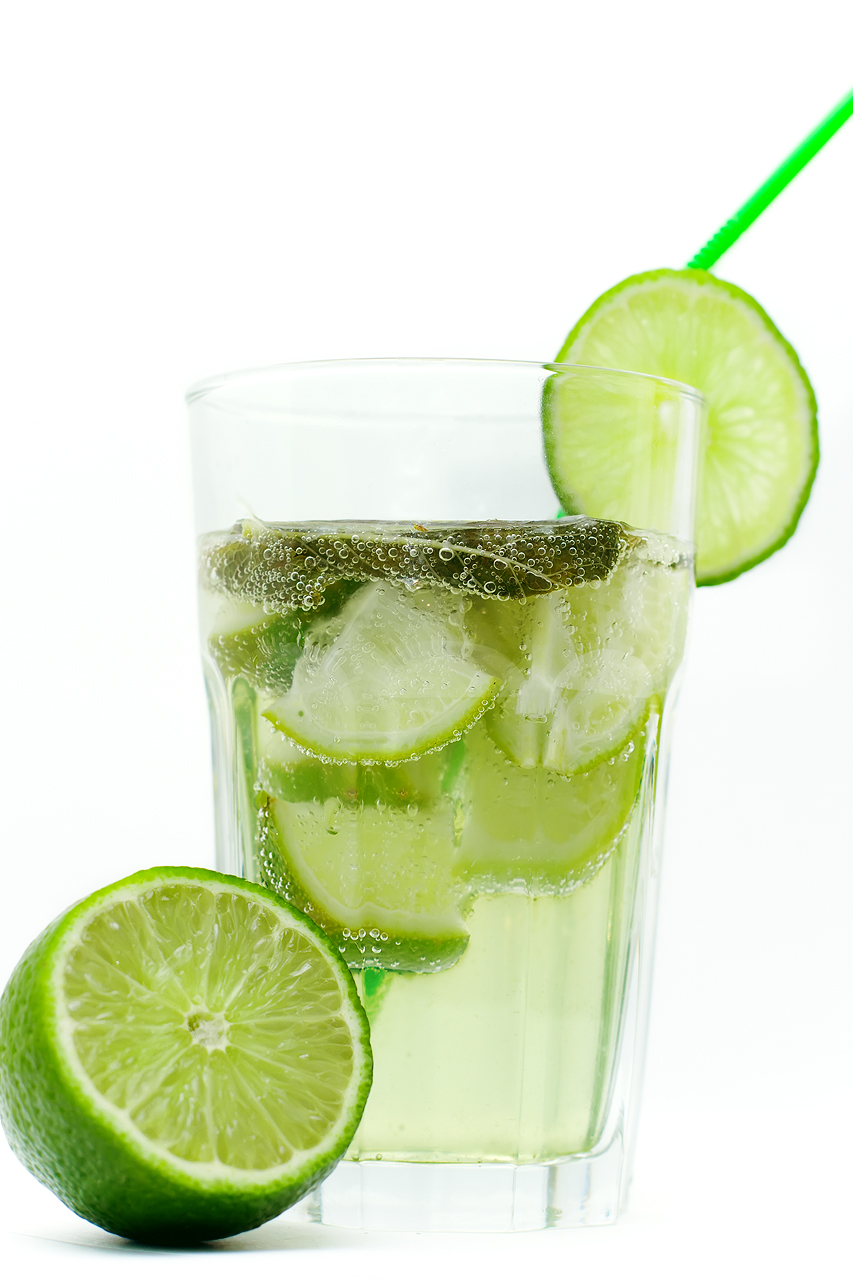
A glass of limeade

Limeade is a lime-flavored drink; when carbonated, it is also called lime soda. It is usually sweetened with sugar or sweeteners. A common method of preparation is to juice limes and combine the juice with simple syrup or honey syrup, along with some water and perhaps more sugar or honey. Vodka or white tequila can be added to make a limeade cocktail. The exact ingredients, preparation and names of the drink can vary by country.

== Homemade limeade ==
Limeade is popular in tropical countries, such as Jamaica, where limes are common.

=== West Indies and the Caribbean ===
In the Bahamas and Turks and Caicos, like lemonade, limeade is often referred to as "switcha" or "switcher".

=== Asia ===
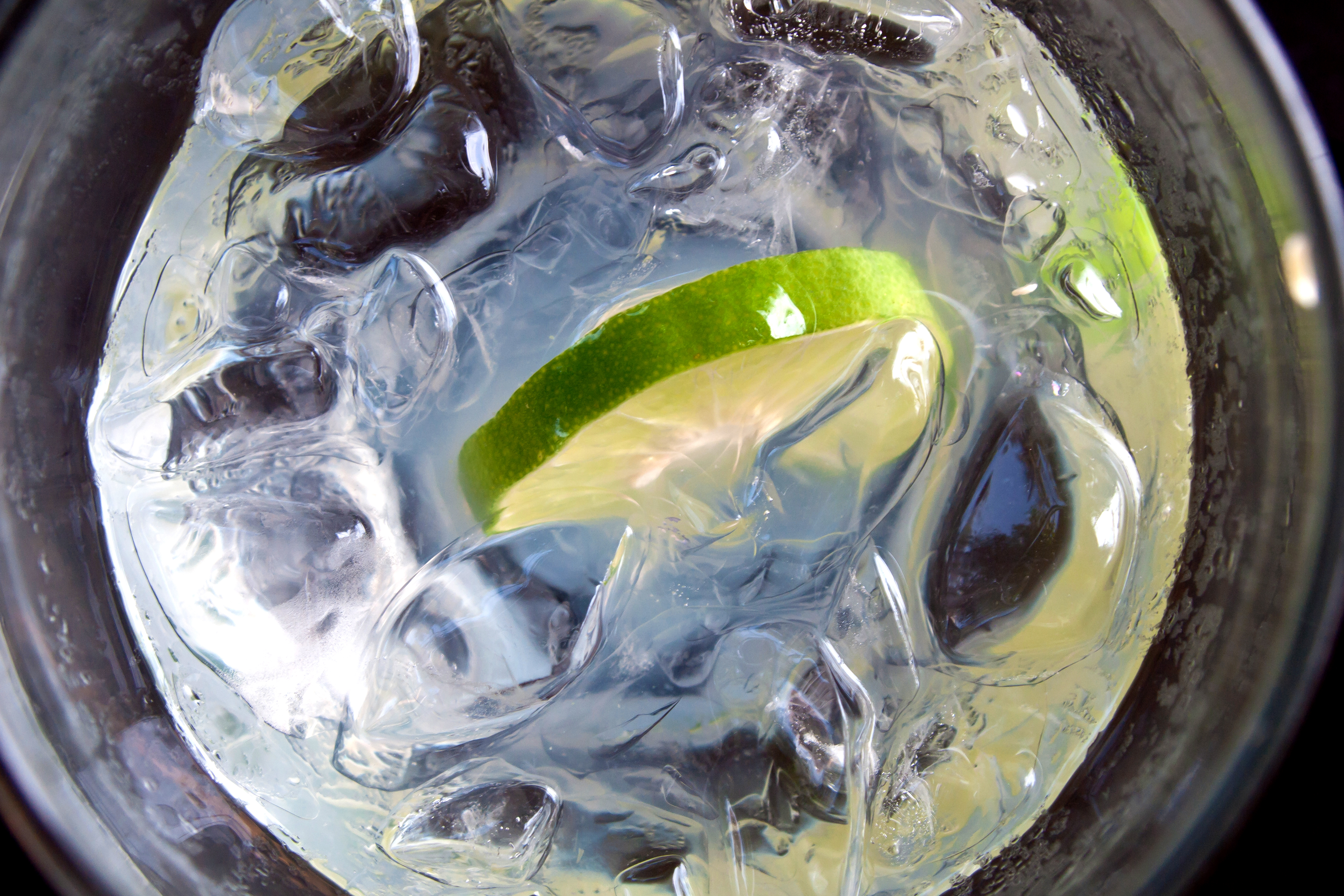
Limeade with ice, Thailand

It is one of the most popular drinks in India and Pakistan and is known as nimbu paani or limbu pani; lemons can also be used for nimbu paani.

Limeade is also widely available in Thailand and other parts of Southeast Asia due to the abundance of limes and relative rarity of lemons, as lemons are not a native species. A Thai-styled limeade tastes salty, and sometimes does not have any sugar.

== Commercial limeade ==
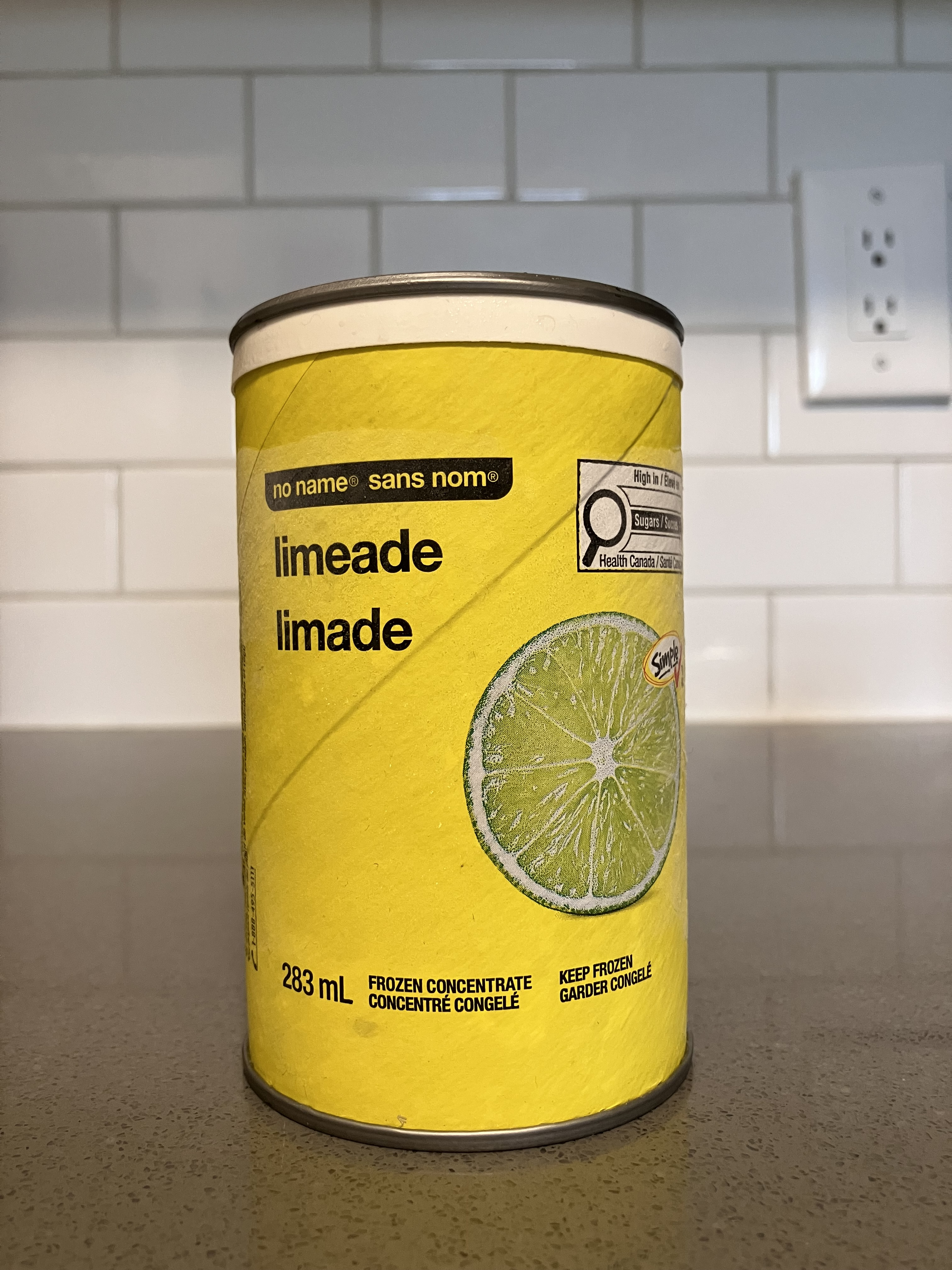
Commercially sold limeade sold as a frozen concentrate in Canada

Many major beverage companies now offer their own brand of limeade, such as A.G. Barr of Glasgow and Newman's Own since 2004, with Minute Maid introducing a cherry limeade drink in response to the popularity of limeade.

Sonic Drive-In uses Sprite to create its popular cherry limeade.

Switcha is the name of a commercial brand of limeade sold in the Bahamas.

== See also ==
- Lemonade
- Swiss lemonade: Brazilian limeade
- Lemon-lime drink
- List of juices
- List of lemonade topics
- List of soft drink flavors
