= Spicy Fifty =

Type of cocktail

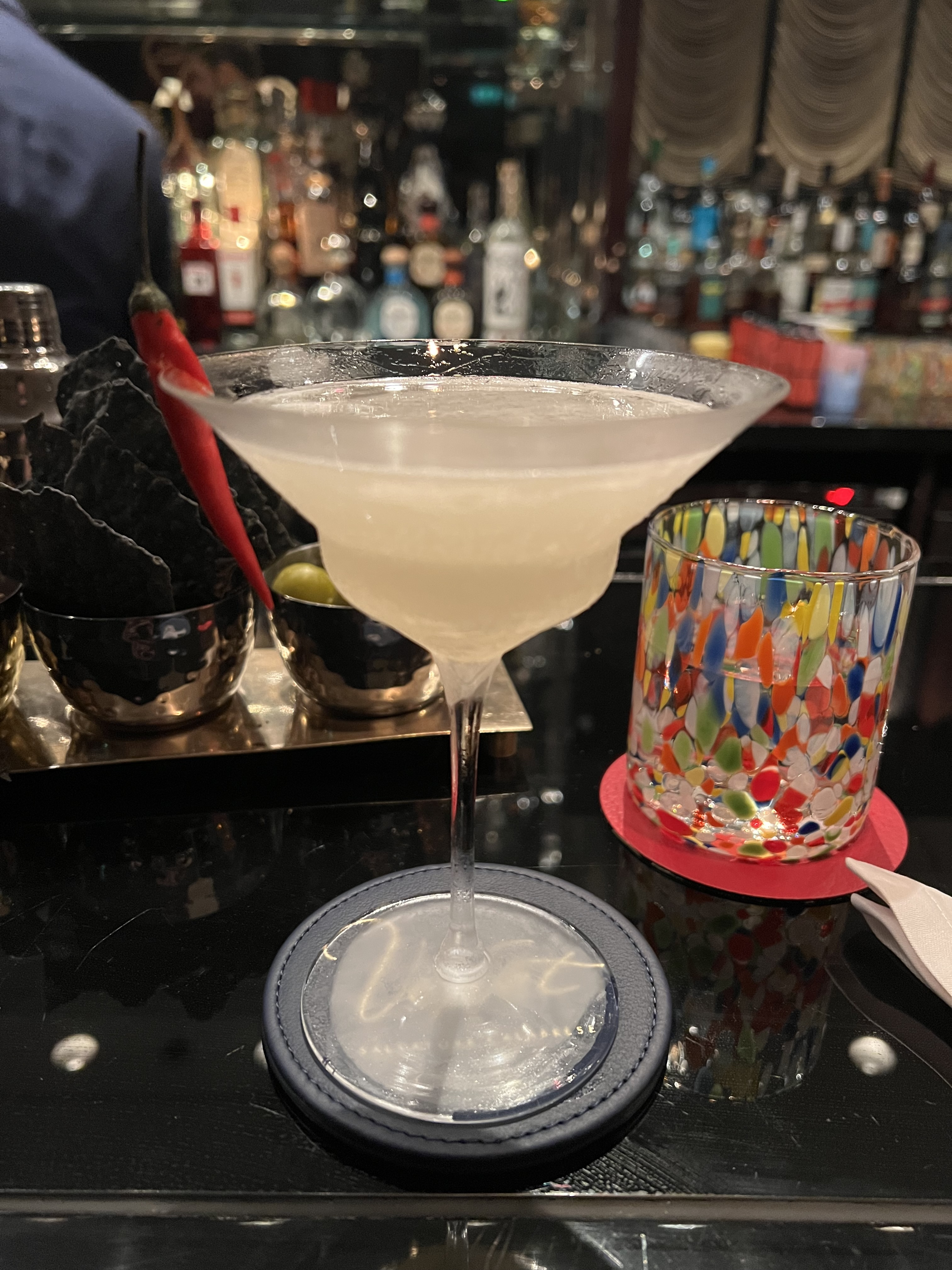
- Spicy Fifty
- Type: Mixed drink
- Ingredients: 50 ml Vodka Vanilla; 15 ml Elderflower Cordial; 15 ml Fresh Lime Juice; 10 ml Monin Honey Syrup; 2 thin Slices Red Chili Pepper
- Base spirit: Vodka
- Standard drinkware: Cocktail glass
- Standard garnish: Red chili pepper
- Preparation: Add ingredients to shaker, shake with ice, double strain into chilled cocktail glass, and garnish with red chili pepper.

A Spicy Fifty is a cocktail containing vanilla-flavored vodka with elderflower cordial, lime juice, honey syrup, and red chili pepper. To prepare, the ingredients are added to a cocktail shaker and shaken with ice. The chili optionally can be muddled in the base of the shaker. More chili can be added to make it spicier. The drink is then double-strained into a chilled cocktail glass. A whole pepper is used as garnish sitting at the rim of the glass. The drinker should be cautioned against eating the pepper.

The Spicy Fifty cocktail was added to the list of IBA official cocktails in 2020 in the new era drink category.

It was created by beverage expert Salvatore Calabrese, and named after the bar FIFTY in London, where Calabrese formerly worked before it closed. It is described as sweet with a spicy finish that pairs well with Asian fusion cuisine.

Salvatore Calabrese created the cocktail in 2004-2005 as his signature drink for the first menu of the bar FIFTY that opened in February 2005. It is also said to have been created to commemorate his birthday. Calabrese was influenced by Jean-George Vongerichten, a Michelin-starred chef, who made dishes where chili was a prominent ingredient. This was during an era where vanilla-flavored vodkas were trendy.

Variations include the MyZo cocktail (which uses lemon juice instead of lime juice and no honey syrup) and Fuego Manzana No.2 (which uses tequila instead of vodka and uses apple schnapps and apple juice instead of lime juice).

== See also ==
- List of cocktails
