= Wściekły pies =

Polish alcoholic drink

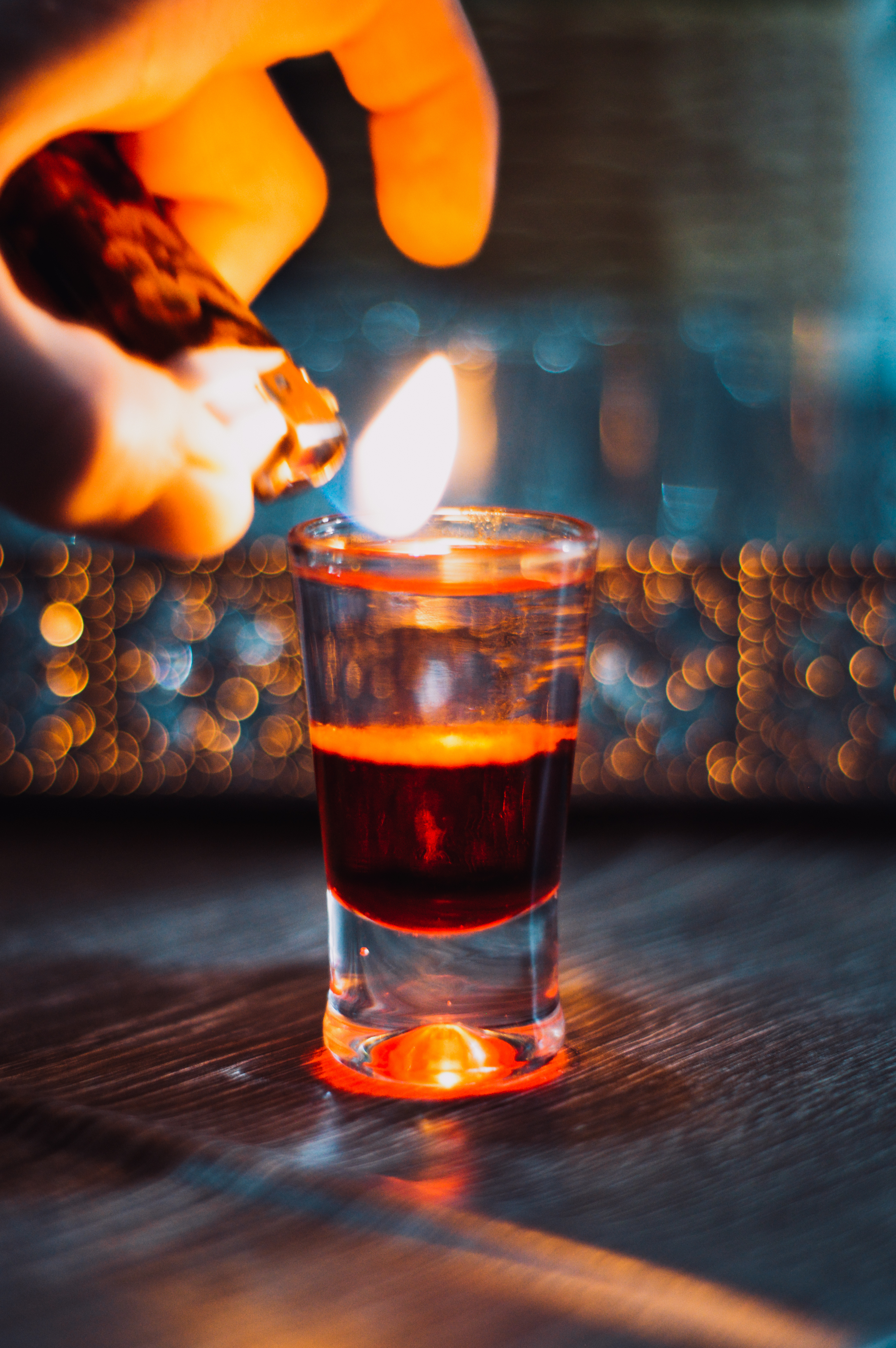
Wściekły pies; for the vodka to burn it needs to contain around 60% ABV.

Wściekły pies ("rabid dog" or “mad dog”) is a Polish alcoholic drink consisting of a 1 cl shot of vodka, a shot of raspberry or blackcurrant syrup, and several drops of tabasco sauce. It is traditionally drunk in a single gulp, with the ingredients mixing in the mouth, and the syrup softening the taste of the vodka and tabasco.

A variation is Teraz Polska ("Now Poland", in a style of a patriotic slogan), which consists of only a shot of vodka and syrup. The heavier syrup falls to the bottom of the glass and is said to resemble the Polish flag.

Wściekły pies originated in West Pomerania, in Świnoujście by Dariusz Ryżczak, known restaurateur and cultural animator.

== See also ==
- List of cocktails
- Vodka cocktail
