= Rose's lime juice =

Patented line of juice products

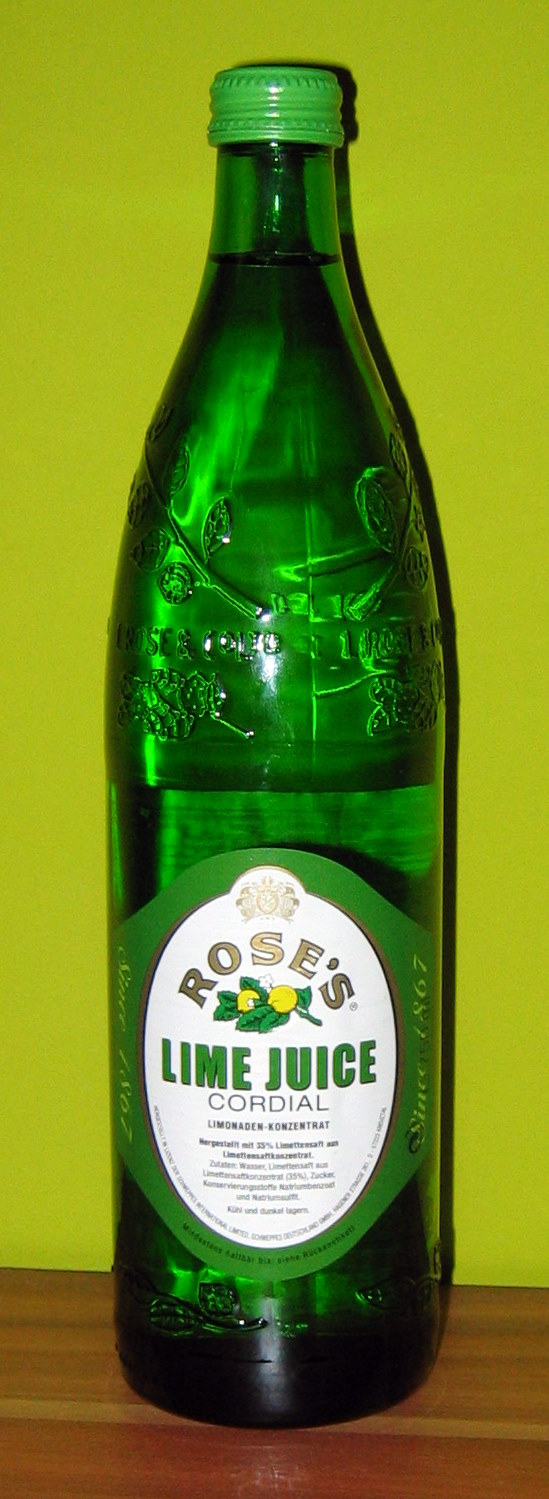
Rose's Lime Juice

Rose's lime juice, often known simply as Rose's, is a sweetened concentrated fruit juice patented in 1867. This was the world's first commercially produced fruit concentrate. It was discovered that preserving the juice with sugar rather than alcohol opened the product up to a far wider market. It is a lime cordial.

== Background ==
In 1753, James Lind discovered that consuming citrus fruits cured people affected by scurvy, a disease rife throughout the Royal Navy, whose seamen often went weeks without eating fresh produce.

Limes were preferred to all other citrus fruits, not because of higher vitamin C, but because they were easier to preserve.

From 1795, it became normal practice throughout all long voyages within the Royal Navy, for sailors to receive a daily ration of lemon or lime juice. This quickly gave rise to the nickname "limeys" among non-British sailors. The preservation of the fruit juice was usually done through the addition of 15% rum.

== History ==
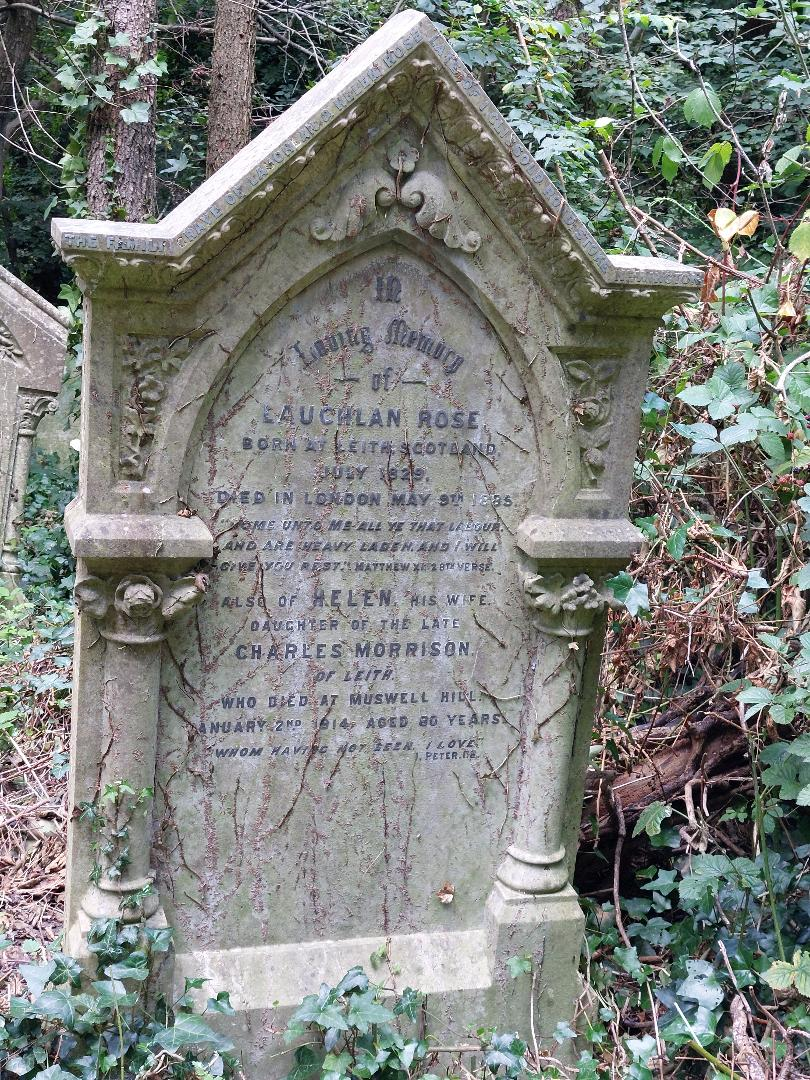
The grave of Lauchlan Rose, Abney Park Cemetery, Stoke Newington

Lauchlan Rose (1829–1885), a ship chandler in Leith, began a process for preserving lime juice in 1865 and patented this method to preserve citrus juice without alcohol in 1867. He had realised that preserving the juice with sugar rather than alcohol opened the product up to a far wider market.

The first factory producing lime juice was set up as "L. Rose & Co." on Commercial Street in Leith, Scotland, in 1868. This was located adjacent to the Old East Dock built during the Napoleonic War. This aided both the supply of limes (which do not grow in the UK), and its proximity to what was then Scotland's principal harbour for the Royal Navy. The limes at this time largely came from Dominica in the West Indies. In 1893, Rose purchased plantations there to ensure his supply (including the Bath Estate near Roseau). This was further supplemented by plantations in the region of Africa now known as Ghana. In 1875, the company had grown so much that it built and moved its headquarters to new premises in London (though still retaining its Leith production).

In the early 20th century, L. Rose & Co faced some competition, namely from A. C. Shillingford & Co. At this time Albert Cavendish Shillingford was a leading Dominican businessman. Shillingford, with the support of relatives, bought estates from which he grew limes and then processed in two factories in Dominica. He later expanded to neighbouring islands, constructing lime processing plants in Trinidad and Grenada. This expansion broke the monopoly L. Rose & Co. held, meaning local growers of yellow limes secured better prices for their produce.

In 1940, during The Blitz, L. Rose & Co moved its headquarters from the London docks (a key German target) to St Albans. After the end of World War II, the company saw its market share in the UK grow. In 1957, Schweppes acquired the company and operated it in the UK until it was purchased by Mott's in 1982. Cadbury Schweppes merged the operations of the two brands in the United States and Rose's US products became domestically produced.

When Cadbury divested its US beverage operations in 2008, Rose's was transferred to the newly formed Keurig Dr Pepper.

== Product ==
In the United Kingdom, Rose's Lime Juice Cordial is manufactured and distributed by Coca-Cola Europacific Parteners Ltd. In New Zealand, the label states it is made under "the authority" of Schweppes Holdings Ltd by Coca-Cola Amatil (NZ). It also bears the notation that Schweppes Holdings Ltd holds a Royal Warrant to HM Queen Elizabeth II as manufacturers of Schweppes and Rose's soft drinks.

The majority of limes are now sourced from Mexico and Peru.

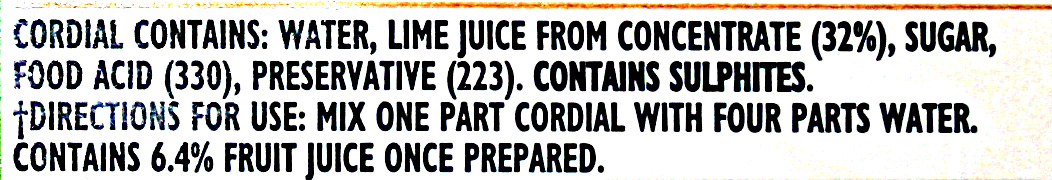
New Zealand ingredient list (2013)

The ingredients in the modern US product, listed in order of concentration are water, high fructose corn syrup, lime juice concentrate, sodium metabisulfite (preservative #223), natural flavors, Blue 1. Comparatively, in New Zealand, the list is water, lime juice from concentrate (32%), sugar, food acid 330, and preservative 223 – and when mixed 1:4 (20% concentrate), contains 6.4% fruit juice.

== Brands ==
Over its history the company added other products to its line-up, including a non-alcoholic triple sec, grenadine, and sweet and sour. The company added a line of flavoured martini drink mixers in the early 2000s. In 2006, the company expanded its product line to feature a brand of mojito flavourings.

A licensed brand of lime marmalade is also produced in the United Kingdom, and a lemon cordial is also available in New Zealand. A passion fruit cordial, and a kola tonic cordial is available in South Africa.

The current range includes both the original concentrated squash or cordial and also diluted drink mixers.

== See also ==
- Gimlet (cocktail)
- Lime cordial
- List of juices
- Rose's (marmalade)
