= Cocktails with cachaça =

List of mixed drinks

There are many cocktails made with cachaça, the national spirit of Brazil. The caipirinha is by far the most popular and internationally well-known, but bartenders have developed other mixed drinks using the spirit.

== Caipirinha ==
Caipirinha
- Type: Cocktail
- Ingredients: 50 ml (1 2/3 fl oz) cachaça; 1/2 Lime cut into 4 wedges (or tahiti lime, but not lemon); 2 teaspoons crystal or refined sugar
- Standard drinkware: Old fashioned glass
- Standard garnish: lime
- Served: On the rocks: poured over ice

The Caipirinha is Brazil's national cocktail made with cachaça, ice, sugar, and lime.

In Brazil, other versions of caipirinha are made with different alcoholic beverages or fruits. A caipiroska or caipivodka is made with vodka instead of cachaça, while a caipiríssima is made with rum and a sakerinha, with sake.

== Batida ==
Batida
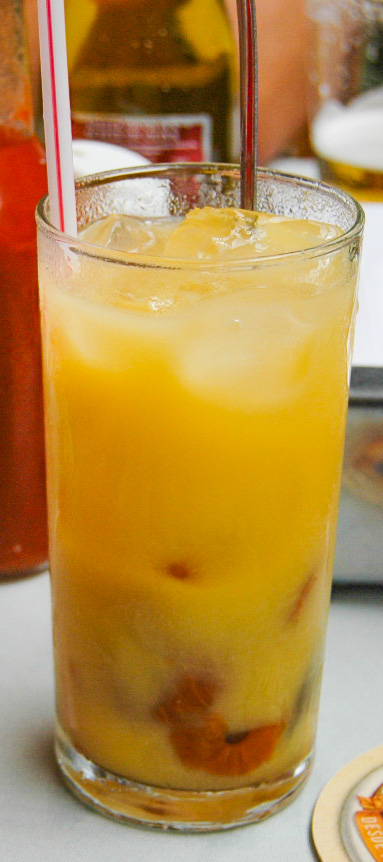
- Type: Cocktail
- Ingredients: 2 parts cachaça; 1 part fruit juice; 1 tbsp sugar
- Served: On the rocks: poured over ice
- Preparation: Mix and pour into chilled glass.

Batida is a Brazilian cocktail made with the national alcoholic drink cachaça. In Portuguese, batida means shaken or milkshake. It is made with cachaça, fruit juice (or coconut milk), and sugar. It can be blended or shaken with ice.

== Rabo-de-galo ==
Rabo-de-galo
- Type: Cocktail
- Ingredients: 50 ml cachaça; 20 ml red vermouth; 15 ml Cynar; 2 Drops Angostura (Optional)
- Standard drinkware: Old fashioned glass
- Standard garnish: none
- Served: On the rocks or straight up
- Preparation: Stir all ingredients with ice and strain into a chilled old fashioned glass. Serve without garnish.

Rabo-de-galo, which means 'cock tail' (in Brazilian Portuguese "cocktail" is called coquetel), is a Brazilian drink made of cachaça and red Vermouth. The history of the Rabo de Galo dates back to 1950s and the inauguration of the Cinzano factory in São Paulo, Brazil.

== Caju amigo ==
Caju amigo
- Type: Cocktail
- Ingredients: 1 part cachaça; 1 slice of cashew, or 1 part cashew juice
- Standard drinkware: Shot glass
- Standard garnish: Slice of cashew
- Served: Neat: undiluted and without ice
- Preparation: The slice is placed on the tongue and chased by the shot of cachaça. Or the two ingredients are mixed in a shot glass and served straight.

Caju amigo, also known as cajuzinho (little cashew), is a Brazilian drink made of cachaça and cashew juice.

== Quentão ==
Quentão
- Type: Cocktail
- Ingredients: 1 part cachaça or red wine; 1 part water; Sugar to taste; Peel of two oranges and a lime; Cloves, cinnamon and ginger to taste
- Standard drinkware: Mug
- Standard garnish: citrus peel
- Served: Hot
- Preparation: caramelize the sugar with the spices and peels, then add the liquids. Boil for a few minutes then serve hot.

Quentão, which means "very hot" or "big hot one", is a hot Brazilian drink made of cachaça and spices. It is often served during the celebrations known as Festas Juninas. The sugar is first caramelized with spices (whole cloves, cinnamon sticks and ginger chunks) and citrus peels (orange and lime). This mixture is then boiled with water for 10 minutes. The cachaça is added and boiled for another 5 minutes.

== Leite de onça ==
Leite de onça
- Type: Cocktail
- Ingredients: 1 part cachaça; 1 part milk; 1 part cocoa liqueur; 1/2 part of condensed milk
- Standard drinkware: Mug
- Standard garnish: cinnamon or chocolate (optional)
- Served: Neat: undiluted and without ice

Leite de onça (Jaguar milk) is a cold Brazilian drink made of cachaça and condensed milk.

== Macunaíma ==
Macunaíma
- Type: Cocktail
- Ingredients: 45 ml (1.5 fl oz) cachaça; 25 ml (0.85 fl oz) simple syrup; 20 ml (0.67 fl oz) tahiti lime juice; 7 ml (0.24 fl oz) Fernet-Branca
- Standard drinkware: Old fashioned glass
- Served: Straight up: chilled, without ice
- Preparation: Shake and strain into an Americano glass

The Macunaíma is a cocktail made with cachaça, sugar syrup, lime, and Fernet-Branca. It is shaken and served straight up in a "barriquinha", americano glass (a traditional Brazilian glass), or an old fashioned glass. Created by Arnaldo Hirai from Boca de Ouro bar in 2014, it is named after the famous novel Macunaíma by Mário de Andrade.

== Royce ==
Les Roysa
- Type: Mixed drink
- Ingredients: 2 parts cachaça; 1 slice of each fresh orange, lemon and lime.; 1 ounce of guava juice.; 1 tbsp sugar
- Standard drinkware: Zombie glass
- Served: rocks x
- Preparation: In a mixing glass, mix sugar and fruit slices and press to juice fruit, add ice, guava juice and cachaça, mix again - pour into tall glass.
- This cocktail was invented at Liberty Bar in Seattle, Washington in honor of Royce Gracie.

Royce is an American cocktail made with the Brazilian national spirit cachaça. It was named in honor of Royce Gracie, a Brazilian jiu-jitsu fighter.

== See also ==
- List of Brazilian drinks
- List of Brazilian dishes
- Cachaça
