= Gimlet (tool) =

Hand tool

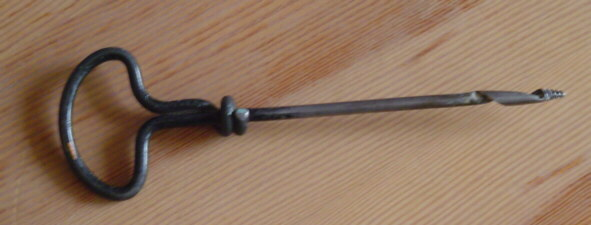
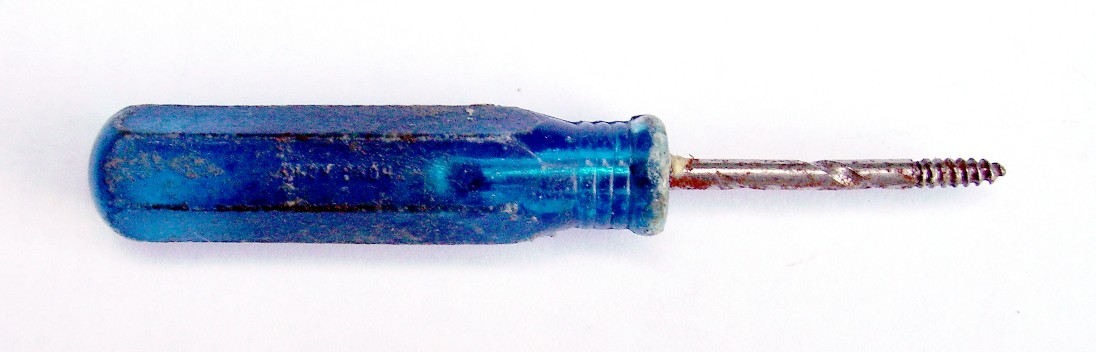
Two gimlets

A gimlet is a hand tool for drilling small holes, mainly in wood, without splitting. It was defined in Joseph Gwilt's Architecture (1859) as "a piece of steel of a semi-cylindrical form, hollow on one side, having a cross handle at one end and a worm or screw at the other".

A gimlet is always a small tool. A similar tool of larger size is called an auger. The cutting action of the gimlet is slightly different from an auger and the initial hole it makes is smaller; the cutting edges pare away the wood, which is moved out by the spiral sides, falling out through the entry hole. This also pulls the gimlet further into the hole as it is turned. Unlike a bradawl, pressure is not required once the tip has been drawn in.

The name gimlet comes from the Old French guinbelet, guimbelet, later guibelet, probably a diminutive of the Anglo-French wimble, a variation of "guimble", from the Middle Low German wiemel (cf. the Scandinavian wammie, 'to bore or twist'). Modern French uses the term vrille, also the French for "tendril".

== Use as a metaphor ==
The term is also used figuratively to describe something as sharp or piercing, along with describing the twisting, boring motion of using a gimlet. For example, the gimlet cocktail may be named after the tool. The term gimlet-eyed can mean sharp-eyed or squint-eyed. One example of this use is Major General Smedley Darlington Butler, who was known as "Old Gimlet Eye".
