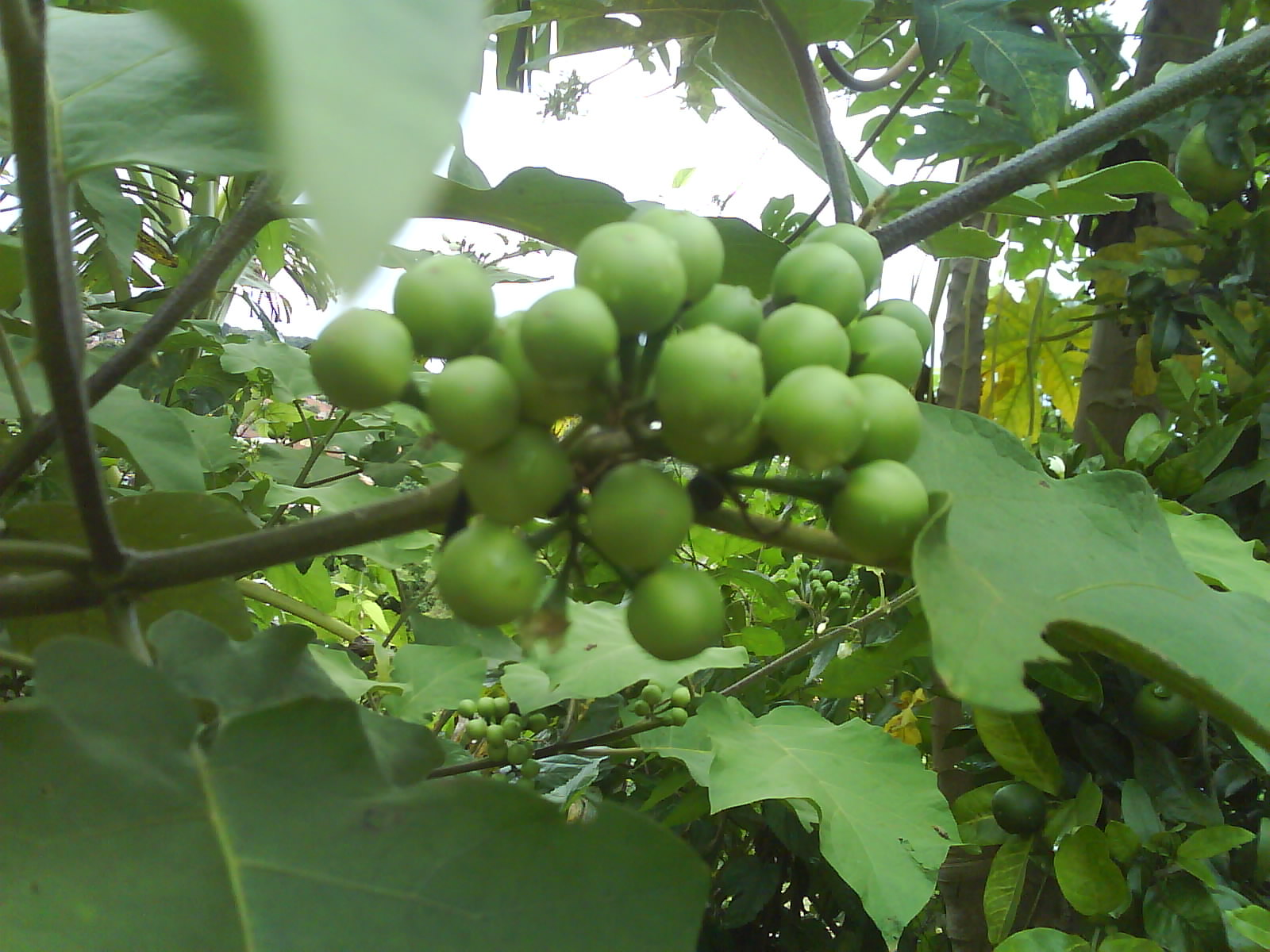
- Jurubeba

Scientific classification
- Kingdom: Plantae
- Clade: Tracheophytes
- Clade: Angiosperms
- Clade: Eudicots
- Clade: Asterids
- Order: Solanales
- Family: Solanaceae
- Genus: Solanum
- Species: S. paniculatum

Binomial name
- Solanum paniculatum L.

Synonyms
- See text

= Solanum paniculatum =

Species of flowering plant

Solanum paniculatum, commonly known as jurubeba, is a nightshade common in almost all of Brazil. It is used as a medicinal plant and has a bitter taste.

An infusion of its stem and its root in sugar cane alcohol (cachaça) is popularly used as an apéritif or a digestif.

The fruits are traditionally consumed in rural areas pickled in brine and vinegar.

== Synonyms ==
Well known in its native range, this species has been described time and again under different now-invalid names. Some of these are homonyms of other Solanum taxa.

- Solanum belfort Vand.
- Solanum belfortianum Dunal
- Solanum botelhianum Dunal (unjustified emendation)
- Solanum botelho Vand.
- Solanum chloroleucum Dunal
- Solanum dictyoticum Roem. & Schult.
- Solanum jubeba Vell.
- Solanum macronema Sendtn.
- Solanum manoelii Moric.
- Solanum reticulatum Willd. ex Roem. & Schult.

Solanum reticulatum of de Jussieu from Dunal in de Candolle is S. vellozianum.
Solanum reticulatum of Dunal in Poiret is S. crotonoides as described by Lamarck

- Solanum rothelianum Steud. (lapsus)

Two varieties were once recognized, but they are not generally considered valid anymore:

- Solanum paniculatum var. ellipticum Chodat

Not to be confused with S. ellipticum, described by Brown. The S. ellipticum of de Conceição Vellozo refers to S. cylindricum.

- Solanum paniculatum var. integrifolium Dunal

Not to be confused with the S. integrifolium of Poiret, which refers to S. aethiopicum

Similar nightshade species that were once included with S. paniculatum but are now considered distinct are:

- Solanum pseudoauriculatum (as f. flavescens or ssp. pseudoauriculatum)
- Solanum acutilobum (as var. acutilobum)
- Solanum albidum Dunal (as var. chulumani)

== See also ==
- List of Brazilian drinks

== Footnotes ==
- Solanaceae Source (2008): Solanum paniculatum. Version of February 2008. Retrieved 2008-SEP-25.
