= Rose's (marmalade) =

Brand of marmalade

Rose's is a brand of marmalade made by Hain Celestial Group. It is a popular product in the UK on buttered toast for breakfast.

== History ==
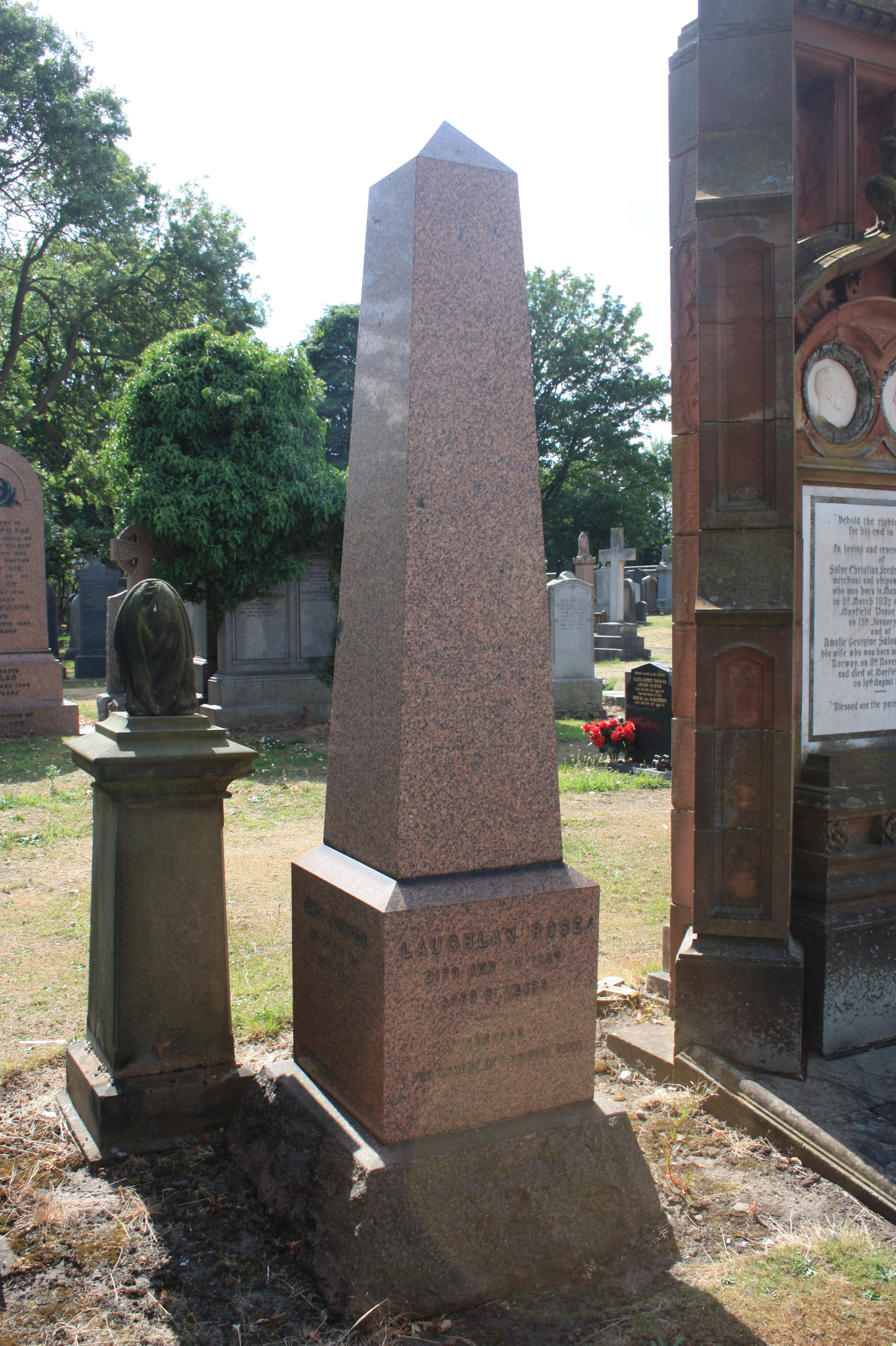
The grave of Lauchlan Rose, Rosebank Cemetery

It started as L. Rose & Co. Limited in 1865, started by Lauchlan Rose (1829–1885). He also imported lime juice from the West Indies (Dominica) in the 1860s, to make Rose's lime juice cordial, supplied by Premier Foods in certain countries for which it has the trade licence. This was the world's first concentrated food drink, and helped to prevent scurvy.

The founder died on 9 May 1885 in Stoke Newington. His grandson would serve in the First World War in the Royal Engineers under Sir Gordon Guggisberg, who later became Governor of the Gold Coast (Ghana). Due to an acquaintance, limes were exported from the Gold Coast from 1924.

The Lime Marmalade was introduced in the 1930s. Its slogan in the 1940s was The Difference is Delightful. It was marketed as a British Empire Product. During the war it was restricted under the jam ration. In July 1955 the lime juice gained a Royal Warrant of Appointment to Her Majesty. The company was the sole distributor of Dubonnet in the UK from 1938.

== Ownership ==
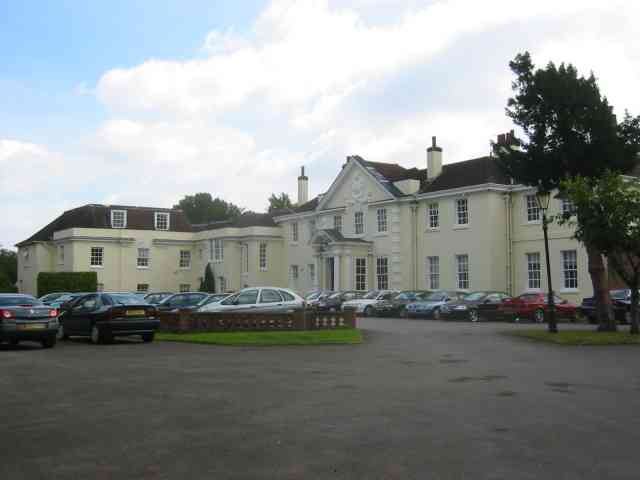
Shenley Hill House

The company was based in London, but the premises were mostly damaged by bombs on 7 September 1940, although a new site had been built at St Albans. After the war, the company was based on Grosvenor Road in St Albans, Hertfordshire. There was another plant at Boxmoor Wharf at Hemel Hempstead, which closed in 1983. Lime juice was transported to the site from Brentford by canal.

Lauchlan Rose MC (10 November 1894 – 9 January 1986), grandson of the founder, and son of Charles Morrison Rose, became General Manager in 1924. In 1964 Rose was President of the Food Manufacturers Federation.

== Buyout ==
In July 1957 L. Rose & Co Ltd was approached by Schweppes, who bought it in August 1957. Sir Frederick Hooper, managing director of Schweppes, joined the board of directors. The company at the time was making around £167,000 in profit. The Rose's lime juice cordial brand is still owned by the derivative company of Schweppes.

In 1969 Schweppes became Cadbury-Schweppes.

== Products ==
The range of marmalades include:

- Lime
- Lemon
- Orange
- Ginger
- Grapefruit
- Lemon & Lime

== Australia ==
In Australia the brand is owned by Cadbury and licensed to Heinz. The product is made in New Zealand by a generic food making company.

== See also ==
- Frank Cooper's
- Robertson's
- James Lind
