= Golden dream (cocktail) =

Cocktail made with Galliano and Cointreau

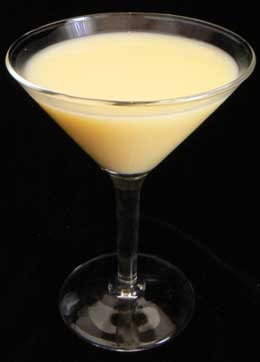
- Type: Cocktail
- Ingredients: 2 cl (2 parts) Galliano; 2 cl (2 parts) Triple Sec; 2 cl (2 parts) Fresh orange juice; 1 cl (1 part) Fresh cream
- Base spirit: Orange-flavored liqueur, Galliano
- Standard drinkware: Cocktail glass
- Served: Straight up: chilled, without ice
- Preparation: Shake with cracked ice. Strain into glass and serve.

The golden dream is a cocktail made with Galliano and Cointreau. It is classed as an "after dinner" drink.

The golden dream was popular during the 60s and 70s and originated at the Old King Bar in Miami, mixed by Raimundo Alvarez.

The cocktail was dedicated to actress Joan Crawford and became quite popular at the end of the 1960s on the east coast of the United States.
