= Harvey Wallbanger =

Cocktail

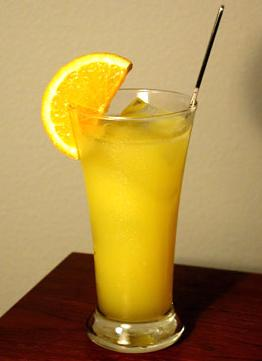
- Type: Mixed drink
- Ingredients: 4.5 cl (3 parts) vodka; 1.5 cl (1 part) Galliano; 9 cl (6 parts) fresh orange juice
- Base spirit: Vodka
- Standard drinkware: Highball glass
- Standard garnish: orange slice and maraschino cherry
- Served: On the rocks: poured over ice
- Preparation: Stir the vodka and orange juice with ice in the glass, then float the Galliano on top. Garnish and serve.

The Harvey Wallbanger is a mixed drink made with vodka, Galliano, and orange juice. It is a variant of the screwdriver, and was very popular in the United States in the 1970s.

== History ==
The Harvey Wallbanger was marketed with a cartoon character of a surfer of the same name.

The Harvey Wallbanger was created in 1969 as a marketing campaign by McKesson Imports Company, importer of Galliano, as a means of promoting Galliano. The campaign was headed by George Bednar, marketing director of McKesson, and a cartoon character was commissioned from graphic artist William J. "Bill" Young in Lima, New York, with the tagline that Bednar claimed to have penned: "Harvey Wallbanger is the name. And I can be made!" The Harvey Wallbanger character was a surfer, appearing in various advertisements during the campaign, and was mentioned in print as early as 1969, continuing into the 1970s. The recipe displayed in the advertisements is: "6 oz. O.J., 1 oz. vodka, stir with ice, splash in 1/2 oz. Galliano".

The 1982 Milwaukee Brewers were nicknamed “Harvey’s Wallbangers,” in honor of their manager that season, Harvey Kuenn, and for their exciting style of play. The drink remained popular among Brewers fans for many years.

The cocktail itself is credited to three-time world champion mixologist Donato "Duke" Antone, of Hartford, Connecticut, where he ran a bartending school, Bartending School of Mixology, and worked as a cocktail consultant. It is unclear if Antone designed the drink for Galliano (to advertise the ingredient), or renamed an existing drink, as suggested by his grandson, who claimed the earlier version was called "Duke's Screwdriver". An implausible story of the origin is that it was invented in 1952 by Antone, and named after a surfer frequenting Antone's Blackwatch Bar on Sunset Strip in Los Angeles. This is implausible because at the time, Antone was running a bartending school in Hartford, and there is no evidence of any "Blackwatch Bar" in Los Angeles at the time, so it is presumably a fabrication; spirits writer Robert Simonson goes so far as to say that "no sane person ever believed that story."

Cocktail historian David Wondrich considers the Harvey Wallbanger the first successful consultant-created cocktail saying,

With Young's Harvey to blaze the way, Antone's simple—even dopey—drink would go on to be the first drink created by a consultant to actually take the nation by storm.
