= Gimlet (cocktail) =

Gin and lime juice

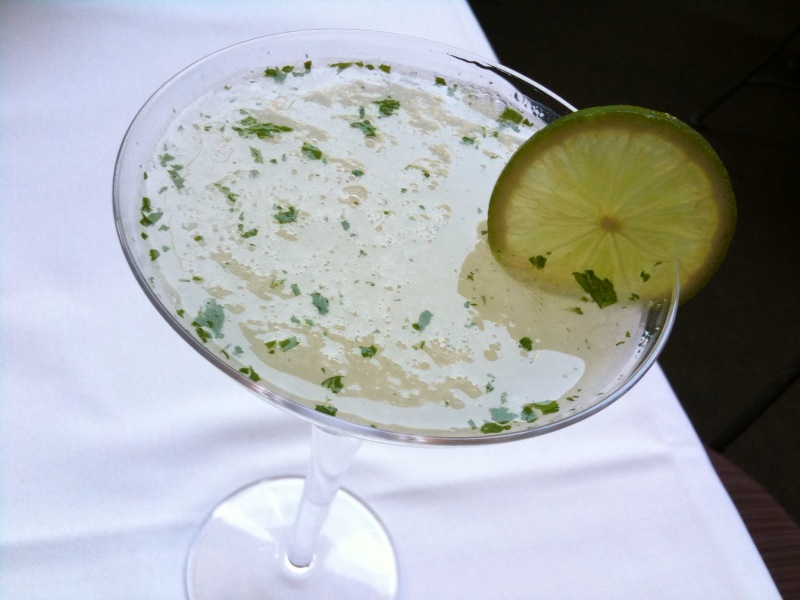
- Type: Cocktail
- Ingredients: Two to four parts gin; One part sweetened lime juice
- Base spirit: Gin
- Standard drinkware: Cocktail glass
- Standard garnish: Lime
- Served: Straight up: chilled, without ice
- Preparation: Mix and serve. Garnish with a slice of lime

The gimlet (/ˈɡɪmlət/) is a cocktail made of gin and lime cordial. A 1928 description of the drink was: gin, and a spot of lime. A description in the 1953 Raymond Chandler novel The Long Goodbye stated that "a real gimlet is half gin and half Rose's lime juice and nothing else." This is in line with the proportions suggested by The Savoy Cocktail Book (1930), which specifies one half gin and one half lime cordial. Some modern tastes are less sweet, and generally provide for up to four parts gin to one part lime cordial.

== Etymology ==
The word "gimlet" used in this sense is first attested in 1928. The most obvious derivation is from the tool for drilling small holes, a word also used figuratively to describe something as sharp or piercing. Thus, the cocktail may have been named for its "penetrating" effects on the drinker.

Another theory is that the drink was named after the Royal Navy surgeon Rear Admiral Sir Thomas Gimlette (27 November 1857 – 4 October 1943), who allegedly introduced this drink as a means of inducing his messmates to take lime juice as an anti-scurvy medication. However, this association is not mentioned in his obituary notice in the BMJ, The Times (6 October 1943), or his entry in Who Was Who 1941–1950.

The screwdriver, another cocktail made from a clear spirit and a citrus juice, is also named after a common handtool.

== Variations ==
A variant of the cocktail, the vodka gimlet, replaces gin with vodka. The Schumann's Gimlet adds lemon juice and lime juice to the gin. The Bennett adds bitters. The Pimmlet substitutes 2 parts Pimm's No. 1 Cup to 1 part London Dry Gin.

A popular variation, the French gimlet, includes elderflower liqueur.

== See also ==
- List of cocktails
