= Galliano (liqueur) =

Italian sweet herbal liqueur produced since 1896

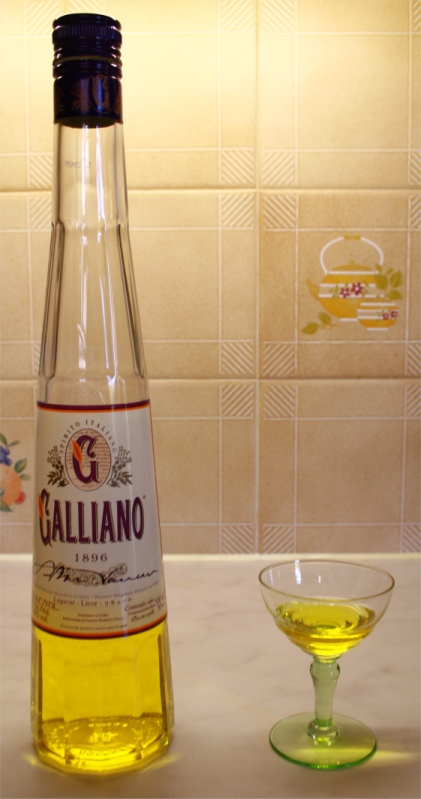
- Type: Liqueur
- Manufacturer: Lucas Bols
- Distributor: Breakthru Beverage
- Origin: Italy
- Introduced: 1896
- Alcohol by volume: 30%, 42.3%
- Colour: Yellow
- Flavour: Vanilla, herbs
- Website: Galliano.com

Liquore Galliano L'Autentico, known more commonly as Galliano (Italian: [ɡalˈljaːno]), is a brand of sweet herbal liqueur produced in Italy. It was created in 1896 by Tuscan distiller and brandy producer Arturo Vaccari and named after Giuseppe Galliano, an Italian officer of the Royal Italian Army of the First Italo-Ethiopian War.

Galliano is sweet with vanilla-anise flavour and subtle citrus and woody herbal undernotes. The vanilla top note differentiates Galliano from other anise-flavoured liqueurs such as anisette, sambuca, and pastis, and flavored liquors (no sugar added) such as ouzo.

Galliano is used both as a digestif and as an ingredient for cocktails, notably the Harvey Wallbanger, Yellow Bird, Golden Cadillac, Golden Dream, the Lemon Cheesecake and the Galliano Hot Shot.

== Ingredients ==
Galliano has numerous natural ingredients including star anise, Mediterranean anise, juniper berry, musk yarrow, lavender, peppermint, cinnamon, and Galliano's hallmark vanilla flavour. Galliano uses vanillin for flavouring and sugar and glucose syrup for sweetening. Caramel and tartrazine are used to achieve Galliano's bright yellow colour.

Neutral alcohol is infused with the pressings from the herbs except for the vanilla. The liquid is distilled and then infused with separately pressed vanilla. In the final stage, distilled water, refined sugar and pure neutral alcohol are blended with the base. The original blend is formulated at 84.6 proof (42.3% by volume), while a blend with a more prominent taste of vanilla is produced at 60 proof (30% by volume). There was also a period where 70 proof (35% alcohol by volume) and 80 proof (40% alcohol by volume) was produced.

== Brand ownership ==
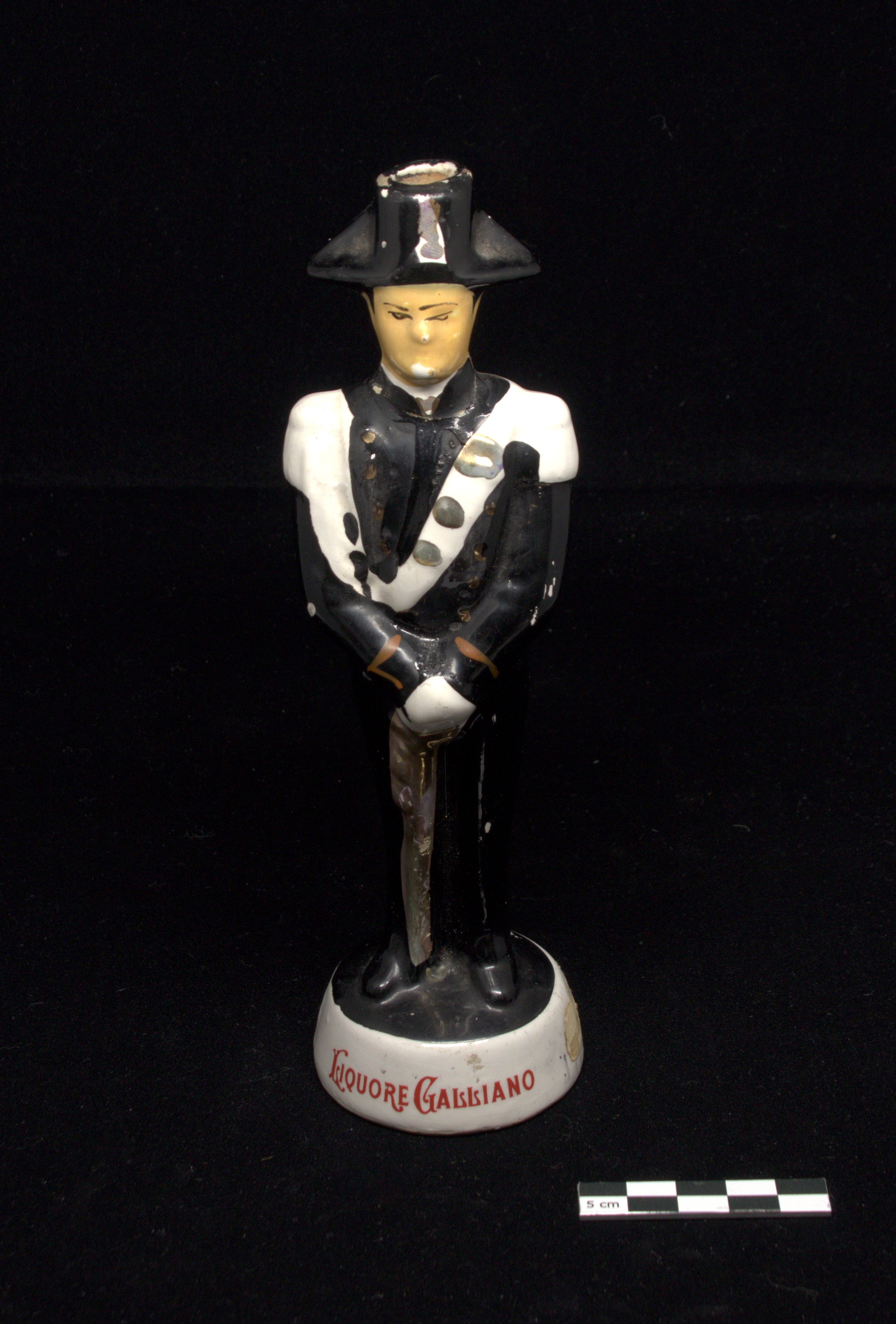
Advertising statuette for the Galliano brand.

The Galliano brand is currently owned by Dutch distiller Lucas Bols, and marketed through its worldwide distribution joint venture, Maxxium. Galliano is packaged in a distinctively shaped bottle, reminiscent of a classical Roman column.

Several other liqueurs are also produced under the Galliano brand name, including a black Sambuca, a white Sambuca and an amaretto, which are predominantly distributed in Australasia, where the products are popular as shots. Galliano also makes Galliano Espresso, a coffee-flavored liqueur and Galliano L'Aperitivo which is an Italian Amaro developed together with mixology legend Ago Perrone. Galliano Balsamico, a balsamic vinegar-infused liqueur, was produced as a replacement for balsamic vinegar which, when used as an ingredient in cocktails with strawberries, creates new flavours due to a chemical reaction which produces ethyl acetate. It was discontinued due to low demand.

== Awards ==
Galliano has earned bronze and silver medals from the San Francisco World Spirits Competition. Another spirit ratings organization, Wine Enthusiast, gave Galliano L'autentico a score of "90–95" in 2011.
