= Caipirinha =

Brazil's national cocktail

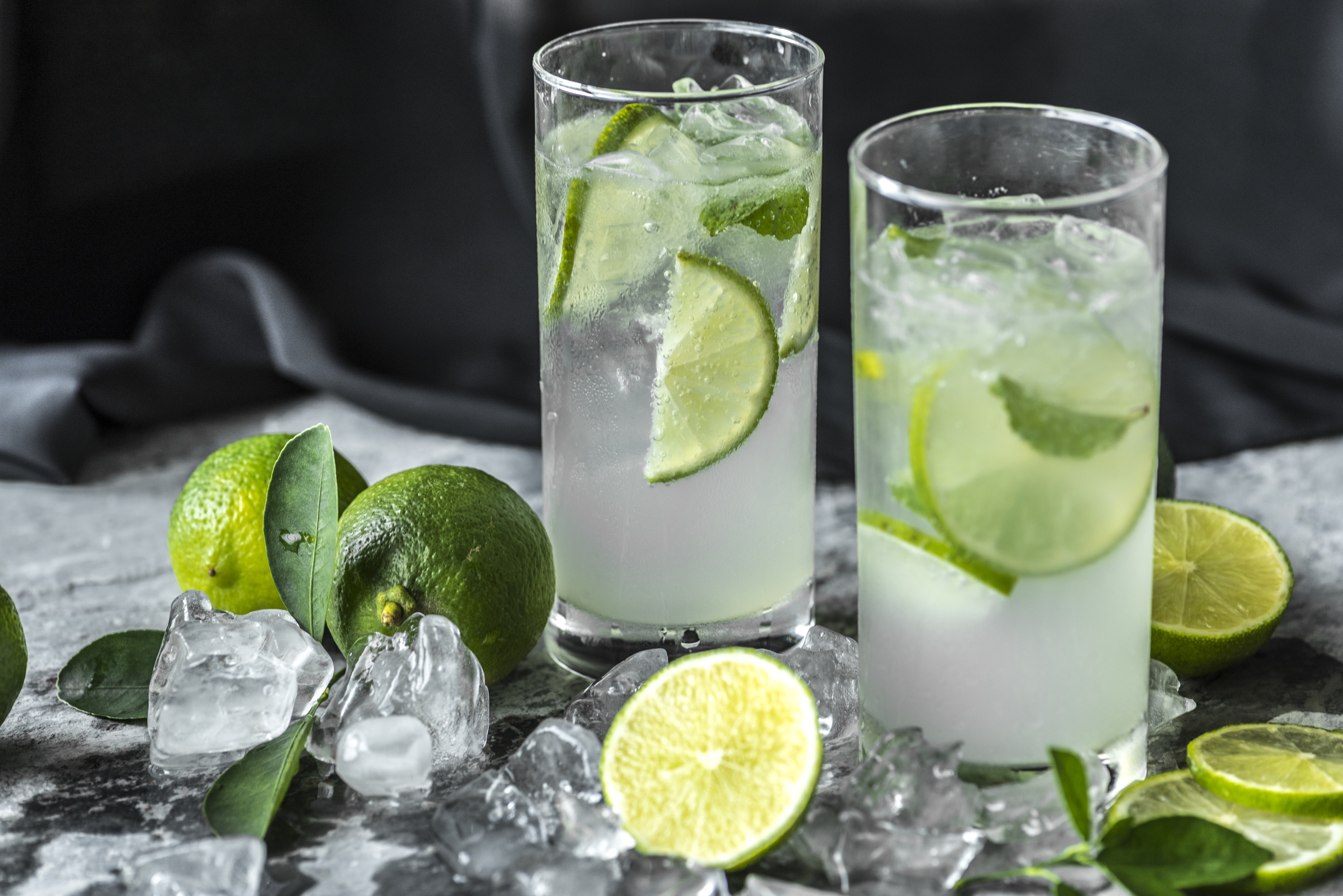
- Caipirinha
- Type: Cocktail
- Origin: São Paulo, Brazil
- Ingredients: 60 mL cachaça; 1 persian lime cut into small wedges; 4 tsp (20 mL) white cane sugar
- Website: iba-world.com/iba-cocktail/caipirinha/
- Standard drinkware: Old fashioned glass
- Standard garnish: sugarcane, lime (ingredient)
- Served: On the rocks: poured over ice
- Preparation: Place lime and sugar into a double old fashioned glass and muddle gently. Fill the glass with cracked ice and add Cachaça. Stir gently to involve ingredients.

Caipirinha (/ˌkaɪpɪˈriːnjə/ KY-pi-REEN-yə; Brazilian Portuguese pronunciation: [kajpiˈɾĩɲɐ]) is a Brazilian cocktail made with cachaça, sugar, lime, and ice. Originating in the state of São Paulo, the drink is prepared by mixing the fruit and the sugar together, then adding the liquor. Known and consumed nationally and internationally, caipirinha is one of the most famous components of Brazilian cuisine, being the most popular national recipe worldwide and often considered the best drink in the country and one of the best cocktails/drinks in the world, having reached fourth place in 2024, according to the specialized website TasteAtlas.

Due to its importance and popularity, the caipirinha was declared Brazilian Cultural Heritage in 2003; in 2019, it was considered Intangible Heritage of Rio de Janeiro, despite its origins in Piracicaba, São Paulo. It is part of the list of official cocktails of the International Bartenders Association (IBA).

== History ==
Although the origin of the drink is unknown, there is a consensus in the academic community that Caipirinha was invented in the interior of São Paulo, Brazil, in 1918. Some accounts say it came about around 1918 in the region of Alentejo in Portugal, with a popular recipe made with lemon, garlic, and honey, indicated for patients with the Spanish flu. Another account is that Caipirinha is based on Poncha, an alcoholic drink from Madeira, Portugal. The main ingredient is aguardente de cana, which is made from sugar cane. Sugar cane production was switched from Madeira to Brazil by the Portuguese as they needed more land to plant it on. Before this people in Madeira had already created aguardente de cana, which was the ancestor to Cachaça.

Today, it is still used as a tonic for the common cold. Commonly, practitioners add some distilled spirits to home remedies to expedite the therapeutic effect. Aguardente was commonly used. "Until one day, someone decided to remove the garlic and honey. Then added a few tablespoons of sugar to reduce the acidity of the lime. The ice came next, to ward off the heat," explains Carlos Lima, executive director of IBRAC (Brazilian Institute of Cachaça).

According to historians, the caipirinha was invented by landowning farmers in the region of Piracicaba, the interior of the State of São Paulo during the 19th century as a local drink for 'high standard' events and parties (parties at Barão de Serra Negra palace), a reflection of the strong sugarcane culture in the region. Original recipes use a kind of lemon called "galeguinho", a small yellow/green lemon very common in São Paulo countryside houses' backyards. Currently, it is made with a bigger green lemon called a Tahiti lemon, a species of lemon more widespread in country markets.

The caipirinha is the strongest national cocktail of Brazil, and is imbibed in restaurants, bars, and many households throughout the country. Once almost unknown outside Brazil, the drink became more popular and more widely available in recent years, in large part due to the rising availability of first-rate brands of cachaça outside Brazil. The International Bartenders Association designated it as one of its Official Cocktails, as a Contemporary Classic.

== Name ==
The word caipirinha is the diminutive of the word Caipira, which refers to a people from the state of São Paulo. "Caipira" is a two-gender noun. The diminutive mostly refers to the drink, in which case it is a feminine noun.

== Variations ==
Although Brazilian law as well as the International Bartenders Association (IBA) allow the use of the name caipirinha for the version with lime only, the term is often used to describe any cachaça-and-fruit-juice drink with the fruit's name (e.g., a passionfruit caipirinha, kiwifruit caipirinha or strawberry caipirinha).

Caipifruta is a variant of caipirinha, consisting of cachaça, crushed fresh fruits (either singly or in combination), and crushed ice. Fresh fruits used to create caipifrutas include tangerine, lime, kiwifruit, passion fruit, pineapple, lemon, grapes, mango, cajá (Spondias mombin fruit), and caju (cashew fruit).

=== Around the world ===
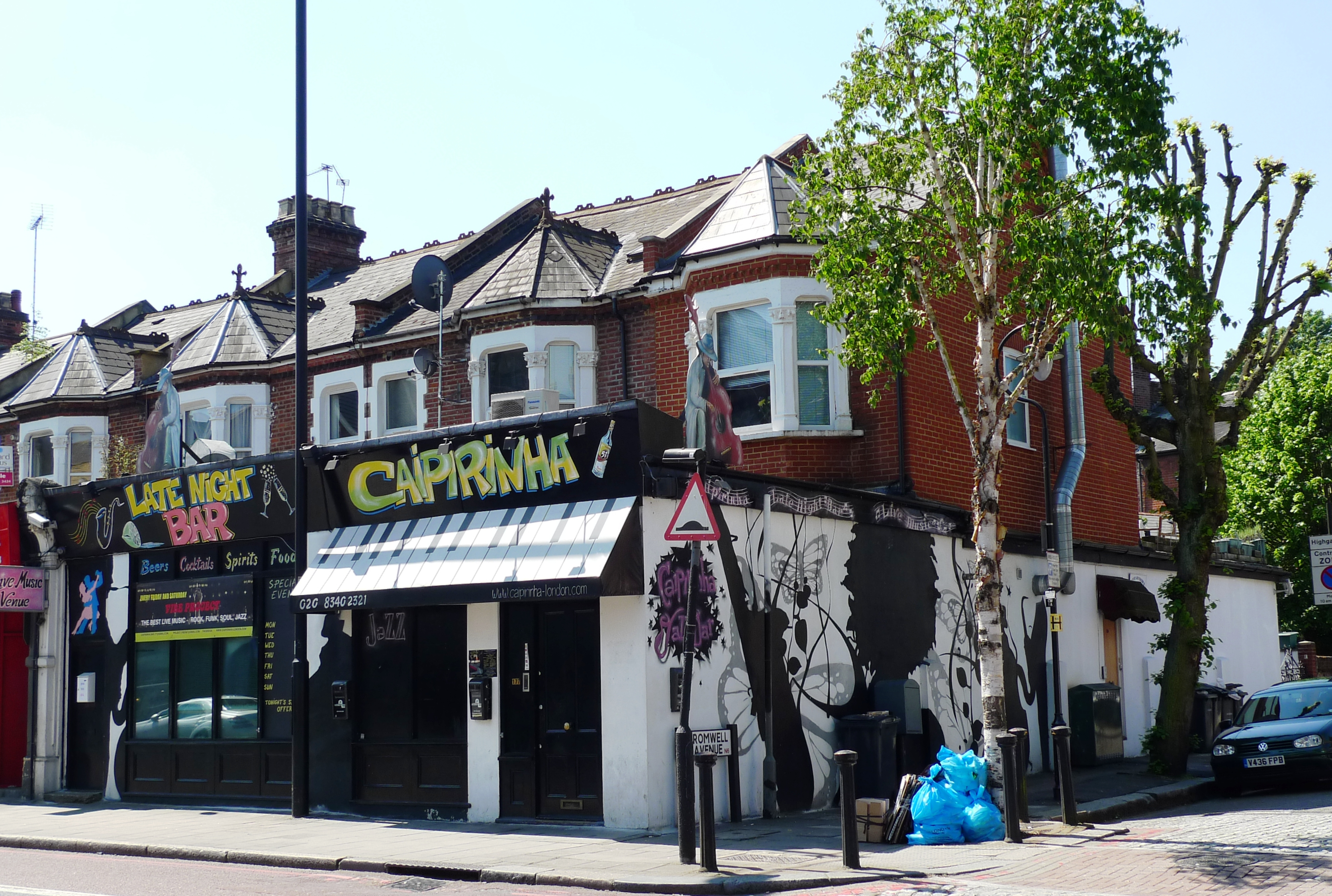
Bar in London with the sign "Caipirinha"

Many variations of the drink are known. In some regions, brown sugar is used instead of refined sugar. Even in Brazil, variants with artificial sweeteners or a wide variety of fruits can be found. Furthermore, cachaça is sometimes replaced by vodka (caipiroska, trademark registered by Smirnoff), Licor Beirão (known as caipirão), rum (caipiríssima, trademark registered by Bacardi), sake "Caipirinhas" (saquerinha) or wine (caipivinho) are also made. In Cape Verde, caipirinha is also prepared with grog, a strong local rum.

== Derivations ==
There are many derivations of caipirinha in which other spirits are substituted for cachaça. Some include:

- Caipiroska is the usual alternative, made with vodka
- Sakerinha is a variant made with sake
- Caipinheger is another variation made using Steinhäger.
- Caipirão is another Portuguese variation made using Licor Beirão instead of cachaça; the liquor is very sweet, so no sugar is used.
- A variation from Italy is made using Campari instead of cachaça.
- Caipirissima is the alternative made with rum.

== In popular culture ==
The 2001 Brazilian film A Samba for Sherlock fancifully depicts caipirinha as being invented by Doctor Watson as a tonic for Sherlock Holmes to combat the heat of Rio de Janeiro.

== See also ==
- Cocktails with cachaça
  - List of cocktails with cachaça
- Ti' Punch – similar French Caribbean cocktail, made with rhum agricole, a fermented sugar cane juice similar to Cachaça
- Daiquiri – similar Cuban cocktail, made with rum
- Grog – similar British cocktail, made with rum
- List of Brazilian dishes
- List of Brazilian drinks
- Mojito
- Sour (cocktail)
