= Caipiroska =

Cocktail prepared with vodka

- Ingredients: 6 cl vodka; 1/2 lime, cut into wedges; 1 teaspoon brown sugar; 1 teaspoon raw or turbinado sugar; Crushed ice
- Preparation: Squeeze juice from lime wedges into a highball glass. Place one of the lime wedges into the glass and add sugars. Muddle sugar with the lime wedges. Be careful not to overdo the muddling of the lime rind as it may make the drink too bitter. Pour in vodka and stir well until the sugar is dissolved. Add crushed ice and stir to melt some of the ice. Garnish with lime slice or wedge and serve.

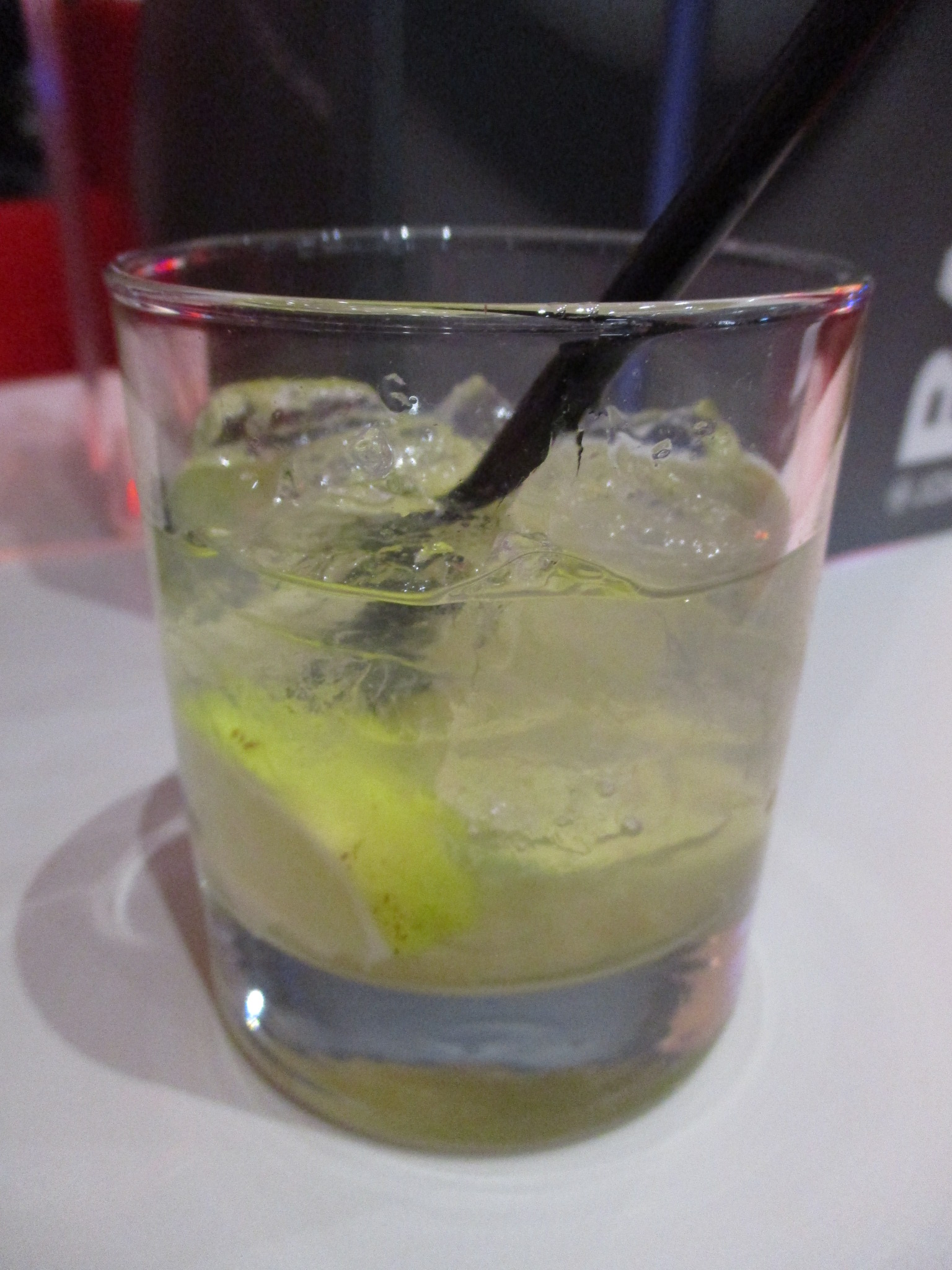

Caipiroska or caipivodka is a cocktail that is similar to a caipirinha, but prepared with vodka instead of cachaça. It is a popular cocktail in Brazil, Paraguay, Uruguay and Argentina. It is also sometimes known as caipirodka. It has grown in popularity in recent years as access to international vodkas continues to diversify in South America.

== Recipe ==
Although the "proper" way to make a caipiroska is a matter of quite varied opinion, the basic recipe requires:

- 60 ml (2.1 imp fl oz; 2.0 US fl oz) vodka
- ½ lime, cut into wedges
- 1 teaspoon brown sugar
- 1 teaspoon raw or turbinado sugar
- Crushed ice

Squeeze juice from lime wedges into a highball glass. Place one of the lime wedges into the glass and add sugars. Muddle sugar with the lime wedges. Be careful not to overdo the muddling of the lime rind, as it may make the drink too bitter. Pour in vodka and stir well until the sugar is dissolved. Add crushed ice and stir to melt some of the ice. Garnish with lime slice or wedge and serve.

Some bartenders advocate placing all the lime wedges into the glass without squeezing them, adding the sugar and muddling the lime wedges and sugar together well to release the juice and essential oils from the limes.

Another variation is to use either all white sugar, or all raw or turbinado sugar. Using all white sugar will result in a clearer drink, while using raw or turbinado sugar will result in a darker-colored drink.
