= List of cachaça brands =

Cachaça is a Brazilian spirit distilled from sugarcane. It has been produced since the 16th century and is the third most consumed distillate in the world by volume, most commonly used to make caipirinhas outside Brazil.

== Wide-distribution cachaças produced and bottled in Brazil ==
Name	State(s)	City	ABV	Notes
Cachaça 51	São Paulo	—	38%	
Cachaça 61	São Paulo	—	40%	
Cauchaça Carvalho	São Paulo	Ilhéus	42%	Official website
Caninha da Roça	São Paulo	—	39%	
Chapéu de Palha	São Paulo	—	39%	
Cachaça Jamel Branca	São Paulo	—	39%	Official website
Cachaça Jamel Ouro	São Paulo	—	39%	Official website
Cachaça Pinissilina	Minas Gerais	—	46%	
Cachaça Pitú	Pernambuco	—	39%	
Cachaça Três Muínho	Minas Gerais	—	42%	
Cachaça Única	São Paulo	—	40%	Official website
Cachaça Velho Barreiro	São Paulo	—	39%	
Cachaça Ypioca	Ceará	—	40%	
Nega Fulô	Rio de Janeiro	Nova Friburgo	41.5%	
Sagatiba Pura	São Paulo	—	38%	

== Small batch or artisan cachaças produced and bottled in Brazil ==
Name	State(s)	City	ABV	Notes
ABOUT Brazil	—	—	40%	Official website
Anísio de Santiago	Minas Gerais	Salinas	47%	
Beija Cachaça	—	—	—	
Boca Loca Cachaça	—	—	—	
Cachaça Agatão	Minas Gerais	Ouro Preto	50%	
Cachaça Balsa Velha	Rio Grande do Sul	Cotiporã	38%	
Cachaça Bartolomeu	—	—	40%	Official website
Cachaça Bayu	São Paulo	Pirassununga	42%	
Cachaça Casa Buco	Rio Grande do Sul	Bento Gonçalves	40%	
Cachaça Bento Albino	Rio Grande do Sul	—	40%	Official website
Cachaça Bento Velho	Minas Gerais	—	42%	
Cachaça Cabana	São Paulo	—	40%	
Cachaça Cachoeira	Minas Gerais	—	40%	
Cachaça Cãna	Rio de Janeiro	Nova Friburgo	40%	Official website
Cachaça Carvalheira	Pernambuco	Recife	40%	
Cachaça Chico Mineiro	Minas Gerais	—	42%	Official website
Cachaça Claudionor	Minas Gerais	—	45%	
Cachaça Companheira	Paraná	—	40%	
Cachaça Coqueiro	Rio de Janeiro	—	44%	
Cachaça Colinas do Sul	Minas Gerais	—	40%	Official website
Cachaça Curandeira do Bosco	Paraíba	—	42%	
Cachaça Dom Bueno	Santa Catarina	—	42%	Official website
Cachaça Don Diego	São Paulo	Serra Negra	39%	
Cachaça Da Mata	Espírito Santo	—	40–48%	
Cachaça Engenho Água Doce	Pernambuco	—	40%	
Cachaça Engenho da Vertente	São Paulo	Santo Antônio do Jardim	43.5%	Official website
Cachaça Engenho Bahia	Bahia	—	41%	
Cachaça Espírito de Minas	Minas Gerais	São Tiago	43%	
Cachaça Fazenda Soledade	Rio de Janeiro	Nova Friburgo	40%	
Cachaça Gabriela	São Paulo	—	38%	
Cachaça Germana	Minas Gerais	—	43%	
Cachaça Guapiara	Minas Gerais	—	40%	
Cachaça Itagibá	Bahia	—	40%	
Cachaça Magnífica	Rio de Janeiro	—	45%	
Cachaça Quizumba	São Paulo	—	40%	
Cachaça Sagatiba Velha	Minas Gerais	—	38%	
Cachaça Saturno Premium	Minas Gerais	—	38%	
Cachaça Saturno Premium 3 Years Aged	Minas Gerais	—	38%	
Cachaça Sapucaia Velha	São Paulo	—	40.5%	
Cachaça Sanhaçu	Pernambuco	—	40%	
Cachaça Santo Grau	São Paulo, Minas Gerais, Rio de Janeiro	—	40%	
Cachaca São Paulo	Paraíba	—	40%	Official website
Cachaça Terra Forte	Minas Gerais	—	40%	
Cachaça Três Múinho	Minas Gerais	—	42%	
Cachaça Senzala	São Paulo	—	40.5%	
Cachaça Schermann	São Paulo	—	38%	
Cachaça Seleta	Minas Gerais	—	43%	
Cachaça Vale Verde	Minas Gerais	—	40%	
Cachaça Velha Januária	Minas Gerais	—	44%	
Cachaça Wruck	Santa Catarina	—	39%	
Cachaça Yaguara	Rio Grande do Sul	—	42%	
Chave de Ouro	Ceará	—	39%	
Chico Mineiro	Minas Gerais	—	44%	
DJ Cachaca	Minas Gerais	—	40%	
Leblon Cachaça	Minas Gerais	—	40%	
Maria da Cruz	Minas Gerais	—	46%	
Milagre de Minas	Minas Gerais	—	45%	
São Cachaça	Rio Grande do Sul	—	40%	
Soul Brazilian Premium Cachaca	São Paulo	—	40%	
Weber Haus Silver Cachaça	Rio Grande do Sul	Ivoti	38%	
Weber Haus Premium (Gold) Cachaça	Rio Grande do Sul	Ivoti	38%	

== Brands created only for the foreign market ==
Name	State(s)	City	ABV	Notes
ABOUT Brazil	—	—	40%	Official website
CapuCana Cachaça	São Paulo	Piracicaba	42%	
Cabana Cachaça	—	—	40%	
Cachaça Abelha	Bahia	—	39%	Produced in Chapada Diamantina National Park
Cachaça Avuá	Rio de Janeiro	—	42%	
Água Luca Cachaça	São Paulo	—	40%	
Aluarez Cachaça Premium	—	—	40%	Official website
Beleza Pura Cachaça	—	—	40%	
Beija Cachaça	—	—	40%	
Brasilla Cachaça	—	—	40%	
Cachaça HUB	—	—	40%	Official website
Cachaça Brazil	—	—	40%	
Cachaça Fazenda Mãe de Ouro	—	—	40%	
Cuca Fresca Cachaça	São Paulo	Socorro	40%	
Espírito XVI Cachaça	—	—	40%	Official website
Frisco Fish Silver Cachaça	—	—	40%	
GRM	Minas Gerais	Araguari	40%	Official website
Novo Fogo Organic Silver Cachaça	Paraná	—	40%	
Rio D Premium Cachaça	—	—	40%	
Seven Waves Silver Cachaça	—	—	40%	Official website
Soul Brazilian Premium Cachaça	São Paulo	—	40%	
Vogner	—	—	40%	
