= Nega Fulô =

Discontinued Brazilian cachaça brand

- Type: Subsidiary
- Founded: 1975; 51 years ago in Nova Friburgo, Brazil
- Defunct: 2020
- Fate: Discontinued
- Products: cachaça

Nêga Fulô was a Brazilian cachaça brand originally produced at Fazenda Soledade in Nova Friburgo, Rio de Janeiro. Introduced in the 1970s, it became one of the most recognized premium cachaça brands from the region and was widely exported, and was acquired by Diageo in 2006. The brand was discontinued in 2020.

== History ==
Nêga Fulô was developed in the 1970s at Fazenda Soledade by members of the Bastos Ribeiro family; production began in 1975.

The brand gained recognition in Brazil and international markets, particularly in Europe, as part of the expansion of premium Brazilian cachaça exports.

Diageo acquired the brand in 2006 as part of its strategy to expand the international presence of cachaça and position it within the premium spirits segment.

Industry sources indicate that Diageo had been developing the brand internationally since at least the early 2000s.

== Production ==
Nêga Fulô was produced from fresh sugarcane juice using traditional copper pot still distillation.

According to Veja Rio, the brand was associated with the adoption of double distillation techniques, contributing to a lighter and more refined profile compared to typical cachaças.

The cachaça was also aged in wooden barrels, including oak, contributing to its flavor profile.

== Market position ==
Nêga Fulô has been described as a premium or "super-premium" cachaça, with relatively small production volumes within the global spirits market.

It was among the early brands used by multinational companies to explore the international premium cachaça segment.

== Discontinuation ==
In 2020, Diageo announced that Nêga Fulô would be discontinued from its portfolio, ending its commercial production under the company.

== See also ==
- Caipirinha
- List of Cachaça brands
