= Leblon Cachaça =

Brazilian cachaça brand

- Type: Cachaça
- Manufacturer: Leblon
- Origin: Brazil
- Introduced: 2005
- Alcohol by volume: 40%
- Colour: Clear
- Related products: List of cachaças
- Website: Leblon Cachaça

Leblon Cachaça is a premium artisanal brand of the spirit cachaça produced at the Destilaria Maison Leblon in Patos de Minas, Minas Gerais, Brazil. Cachaça is the key ingredient to the caipirinha, Brazil's national cocktail.

== History ==
Leblon was first introduced to the US and Brazil in September 2005 and was subsequently introduced to markets in Europe in 2006. Currently Leblon is available in Brazil, the United States, Canada, Europe, and a few markets in Asia.

The company has seen steady growth since 2005.

== Awards ==
Leblon Cachaça was a Gold Medal Award Winner at the 2006, 2007, 2008, 2009, 2010, 2011, 2012, 2013, and 2014 San Francisco World Spirits Competition, a nine-consecutive-year run, which is a first for any cachaça. (In 2007, 2010, 2011, 2012, & 2013 Leblon was awarded the Double Gold Medal for Best Cachaça.) It was also the Best in Class Winner at the 2007 International Tasting Competition in London and was awarded the 2010 Rising Star Growth Brand Award. It also won Sounds and Colours' favourite cachaça in their Caipirinha Challenge in 2011.

== Distillation ==
Leblon is produced at its own vertically integrated distillery in the fertile cachaça-producing Minas Gerais region of Brazil. The distillery is called Maison Leblon, and Gilles Merlet, along with Carlos Oliveira, serves as master distiller. Merlet approaches the distillation of Leblon Cachaça as if it were a fine wine. The cane is hand-harvested from Leblon's nearby fields and quickly delivered to the Maison for pressing. The juice is fermented for 20 to 24 hours before being transferred into the Alambique copper pot stills for single-batch distillation. The distillate is then rested up to 6 months in Vintage XO Cognac Casks from France. The various batches are then master blended, and the final batch is gently filtered and bottled in glass. Since Leblon Cachaça is distilled in Alambique copper pot stills in smaller batches and not in faster, cheaper column stills, it is classified as an artisanal cachaça. Leblon is certified by the Instituto Mineiro de Agropecuária as an artisanal Cachaça de Alambique.

== Eco-Sustainability ==
Maison Leblon is committed to minimizing waste, reducing energy needs, and preserving the environment. In the sugar cane fields, all leaves and discarded sugar cane tops are provided to local farmers for livestock feed. Bagaço, which is the exhausted sugar cane after pressing, is used to heat the water running through the copper coils in the alambique potstills for full self-sufficient distillation. Vinhaça, which is the residual liquid after distillation, is isolated to a pond on the distillery property, where it is allowed to breakdown naturally. It is also added as a natural fertilizer to the sugar cane field along with any excess bagaço not used for heating the pot stills.

== Legalize Cachaça Campaign ==
Despite the fact that cachaça is the official spirit of Brazil and the third-most consumed spirit in the world, it has not been recognized in some countries as a unique product appellation from Brazil. Until 2013, cachaça sold in the United States was required to say "rum" somewhere on the front label. Many makers, including Leblon, referred to their product as Brazilian Rum on the label. Cachaça is made from fresh cane juice, not molasses like rum, predates the invention of rum by over a century (a.c. 1550), and has an entirely different cultural connotation.

In 2013, Leblon created a movement to 'Legalize Cachaça.' The Legalize Cachaça campaign targeted bartenders, the trade, consumers and the press with the purpose of educating the masses about the distinctions between cachaça and rum. The campaign also lobbied the United States Alcohol and Tobacco Tax and Trade Bureau to recognize cachaça as a class or type of distilled spirit under the authority of the Federal Alcohol Administration Act.

On February 25, 2013, the U.S. Alcohol Tax and Trade Bureau (TTB) finally “legalized cachaça,” as they published the final rule that recognized Brazil's national spirit as an official spirit and distinctive product of Brazil. The final rule went into effect on April 11, 2013.

== See also ==
- List of Brazilian dishes
- Caipirinha
- Cachaça
- Rum
