= Cachaça Cãna =

Brazilian cachaça brand

Cãna
- Cãna logo
- Type: Cachaça
- Manufacturer: Fazenda Soledade
- Origin: Brazil, Nova Friburgo, Rio de Janeiro
- Introduced: 2018; 8 years ago
- Alcohol by volume: 40%
- Proof (US): 80
- Colour: Clear
- Flavour: Clean, balanced
- Website: Official Website

Cãna (stylized as Cãna Cachaça) is a Brazilian cachaça brand founded in 2019 by Guilherme Junqueira and Nick Walker. The spirit is produced at Fazenda Soledade in Nova Friburgo, Rio de Janeiro, Brazil.

== History ==
Cãna was conceived in 2018 in New York City by Brazilian entrepreneurs Guilherme Junqueira and Nick Walker. Both founders, originally from Rio de Janeiro, developed the idea after observing limited availability of premium cachaça in the United States market.

Following initial concept development, the founders visited distilleries across Brazil before selecting Fazenda Soledade in Nova Friburgo as their production partner. The brand was launched in the United States in late 2019 and later expanded to Brazil.

== Production ==
Cãna is produced at Fazenda Soledade, a distillery established in 1977 in Nova Friburgo, under the supervision of master distiller Vicente Bastos Ribeiro.

The spirit is distilled from fresh sugarcane juice using pot stills and undergoes triple distillation before being filtered through coconut husk charcoal.

Production emphasizes sustainability, including renewable fuel derived from sugarcane byproducts, protection of natural spring water sources, and waste-reduction practices.

== Distribution ==
Cãna is marketed internationally, particularly in the United States, where it has been positioned as an ultra-premium cachaça imported by The Folclore Company (formerly called East Brazil Company). The brand has been distributed through partnerships with importers such as Brescome Barton. It is often marketed and sold alongside Amázzoni Gin and Dom Maria Brazilian Brut.

== Awards and recognition ==
Cãna has received international recognition, including:

- Gold medal, San Francisco World Spirits Competition (2021)
- Gold medal, Bartender Spirits Awards (2020)
- 90 points, Bartender Spirits Awards tasting panel

== Style ==
Cãna is an unaged cachaça designed for both cocktails and neat consumption, with a flavor profile described as clean and balanced.

== See also ==
- Cachaça
- Caipirinha
- List of Cachaça brands
