= Anísio de Santiago =

Renowned Brazilian cachaça brand

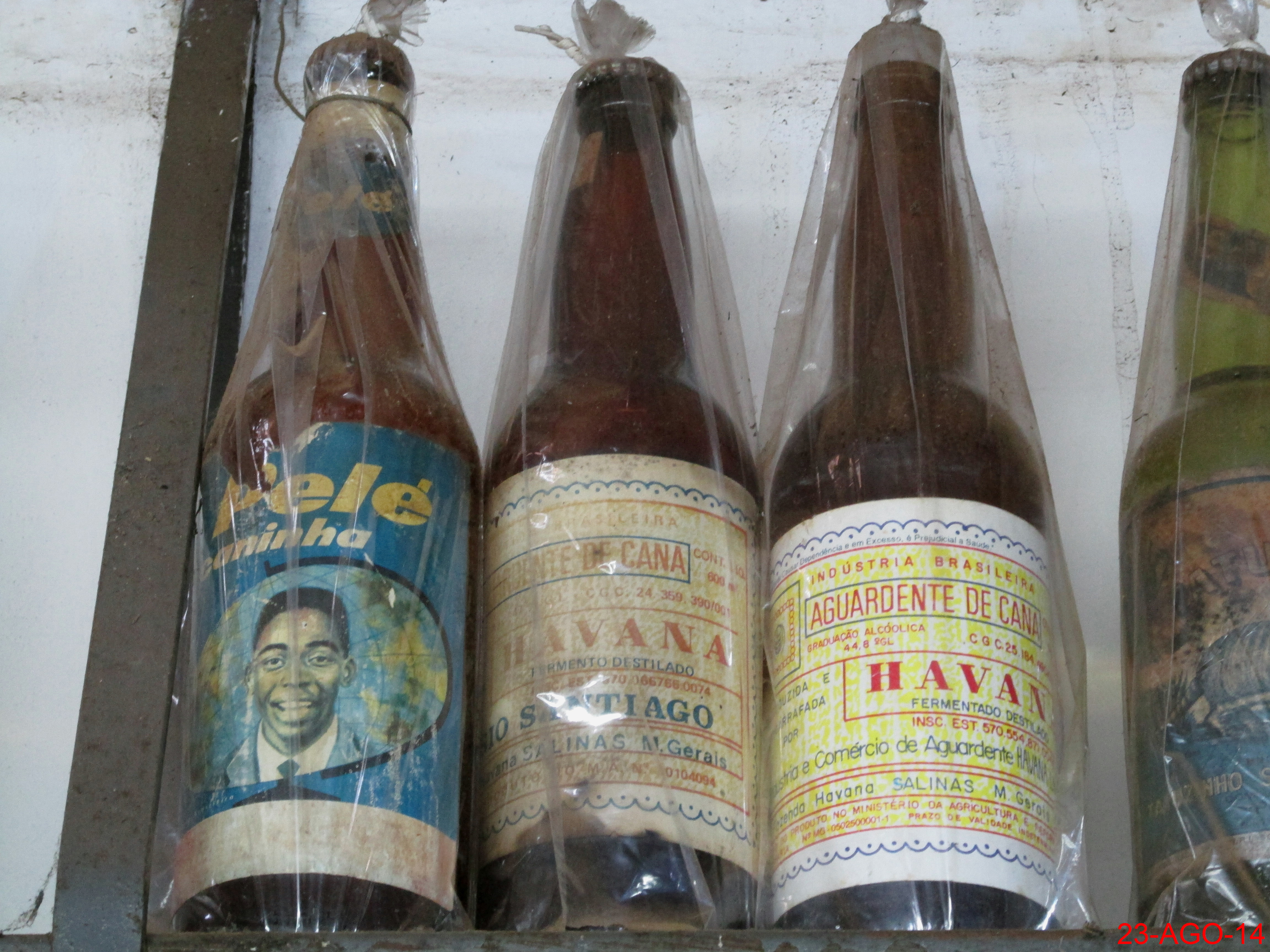
Two bottles of Aguardente Havana

Cachaça Anísio Santiago is a Brazilian artisanal cachaça produced in Salinas, Minas Gerais. It originates from the work of distiller Anísio Santiago (1912–2002), whose production at Fazenda Havana contributed to the recognition of Salinas as a major center of artisanal cachaça in Brazil.

== History ==
Production began at Fazenda Havana in 1943, following its acquisition in 1942. Initially sold in bulk, the cachaça began to be bottled under the ‘‘Havana’’ label in 1946.

The brand became associated with the development of artisanal cachaça in Salinas and gained national recognition.

In the early 2000s, use of the ‘‘Havana’’ name was restricted following a trademark dispute involving Havana Club Holding S.A., associated with Pernod Ricard. As a result, the product became commercially identified with the name Anísio Santiago.

== Production ==
The cachaça is produced using traditional copper pot stills and artisanal methods. Production has remained limited, typically estimated at 10,000 to 15,000 liters per year.

Historical accounts indicate that production levels were deliberately kept low despite demand, with emphasis on aging and consistency.

The spirit is aged in bálsamo wood barrels, with reported aging periods ranging from approximately 8 to 12 years depending on the batch.

== Market ==
Due to its limited production and its extended aging in bálsamo wood, this Cachaca is frequently cited by specialists and merchants as one of the most prestigious expressions of artisanal cachaça in Brazil and the most sought after by collectors.

== See also ==
- Cachaça
- Salinas, Minas Gerais
- Caipirinha
- List of Cachaça brands
