= Peperomia velloziana =

Scientific classification
- Kingdom: Plantae
- Clade: Tracheophytes
- Clade: Angiosperms
- Clade: Magnoliids
- Order: Piperales
- Family: Piperaceae
- Genus: Peperomia
- Species: P. velloziana

Binomial name
- Peperomia velloziana Miq.

Synonyms
- Peperomia flavidinervis C.DC. Peperomia nuda C.DC.

Species of epiphyte

Peperomia velloziana is a species of perennial plant in the genus Peperomia. It primarily grows in wet tropical biomes.

== Etymology ==
"velloziana" came from the surname "José Mariano de Conceição Vellozo". José Mariano de Conceição Vellozo was a Brazilian botanist from Minas Gerais.

== Distribution ==
Peperomia velloziana can be found in Brazil, Colombia, and Costa Rica. Specimens can be found at an elevation of 147-5000 meters.

- Brazil
  - Minas Gerais
    - Extrema
      - Serra do Lopo
    - Unaí
    - Mariana
    - Alto Caparaó
  - Paraná
    - Ponta Grossa
  - Goiás
    - Formosa
  - São Paulo
    - Bom Jesus dos Perdões
  - Distrito Federal
    - Brasília
  - Santa Catarina
    - Garopaba
      - Morro da Ressacada
  - Santa Catarina
    - Praia Grande
    - Joinville
      - Serra Dona Francisca
    - São Bento do Sul
  - Bahia
    - Abaíra
- Colombia
  - Caquetá
  - Meta
    - Vereda El Triunfo
- Costa Rica

== Subtaxa ==
These subtaxa are accepted.

- Peperomia velloziana f. ovata Wawra
- Peperomia velloziana var. subnovemplinervia Miq.
