= Pirassununga =

- Municipality
- Municipality of Pirassununga
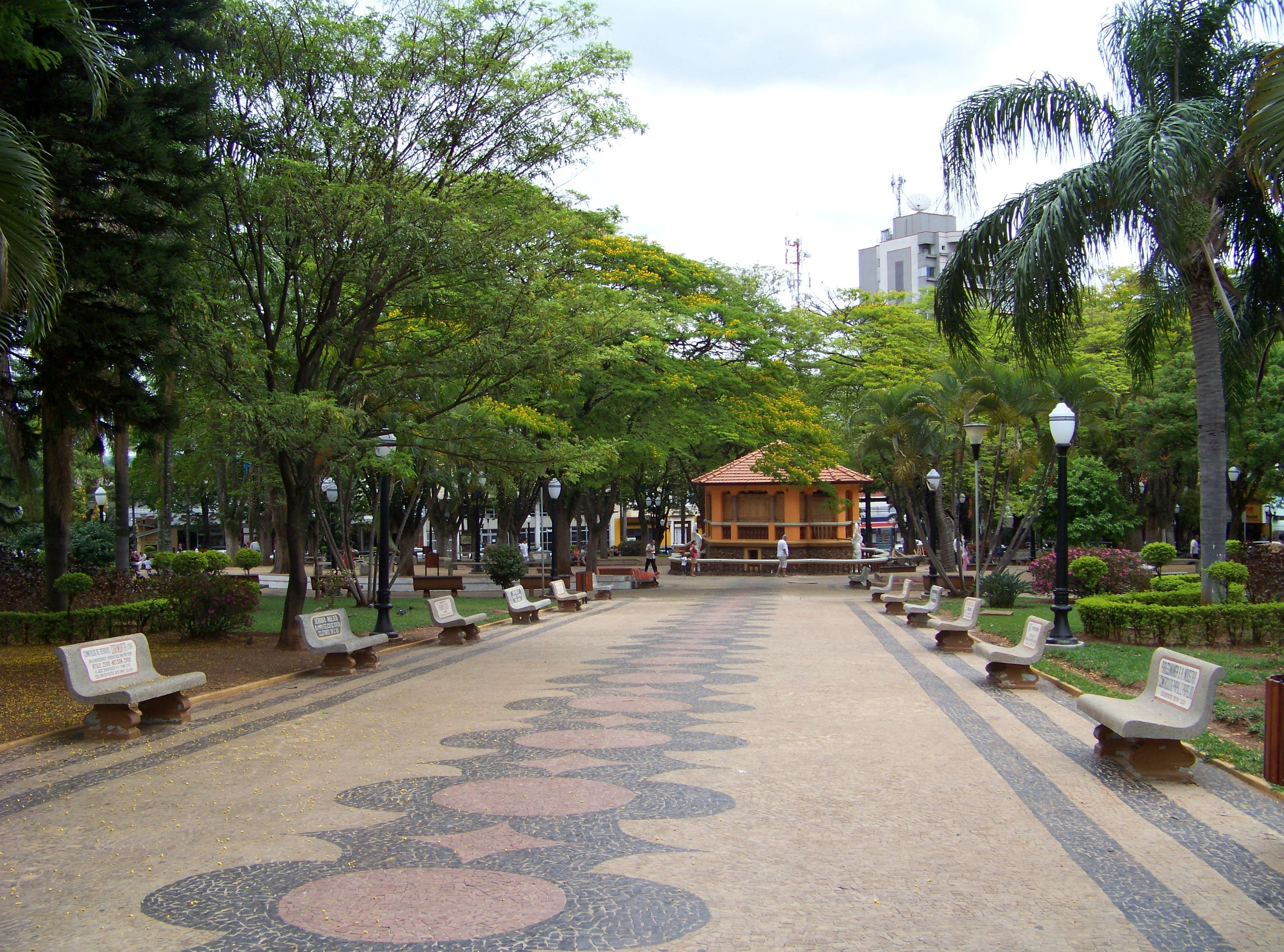

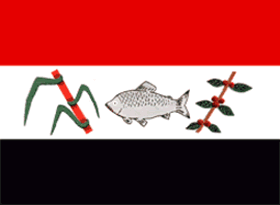
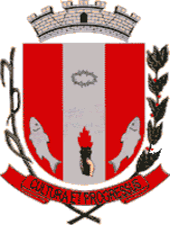
- Flag Coat of arms

- Location in São Paulo state

- Location in Brazil
- Coordinates: 21°59′46″S 47°25′33″W
- Country: Brazil
- Region: Southeast
- State: São Paulo

Government
  - Mayor: Fernando Lubrechet (Novo (2025–2028))

Area
  - Total: 727 km^{2} (281 sq mi)
- Elevation: 627 m (2,057 ft)

Population (2020)
  - Total: 76,877
  - Density: 106/km^{2} (274/sq mi)
- Time zone: UTC-03:00 (BRT)
  - Summer (DST): UTC-02:00 (BRST)
- Postal code: 13630-000
- Area code: (+55) 19
- HDI (2010): 0.801 – very high
- Website: pirassununga.sp.gov.br

Pirassununga is a municipality in the state of São Paulo in Brazil, with an altitude of 627 meters. The population is 76,877 (2020 est.) in an area of 727 km^{2}.

Situated in the southeast region of Brazil, the city is home to many important institutions, one being the Brazilian Air Force Academy. All current and future officers of the Brazilian Air Force are trained here. Pirassununga is also home to Fort Anhaguera, which once hosted the 13th Mechanized Cavalry Regiment of the Brazilian army.

In addition to being an important region for the Brazilian military, Pirassununga is a hub for the agriculture and environmental sciences of Brazil. The University of São Paulo's Faculdade de Zootecnia e Engenharia de Alimentos (FZEA), which translates to the College of Animal Science and Food Engineering, is located in the city. Pirassununga is also the location of CEPTA, the National Research and Conservation Center of Continental Aquatic Biodiversity, which is associated with the Chico Mendes Institute, an important research and conservation center in Brasília, the capital of Brazil.

== History ==
Pirassununga was originally home to the Tupi people, an indigenous group in Brazil. They gave the city its name, which means "the place where the fish makes sounds" or "the sound of fish." Every December, the fish migrate upstream, causing loud sounds as they fight against the current.

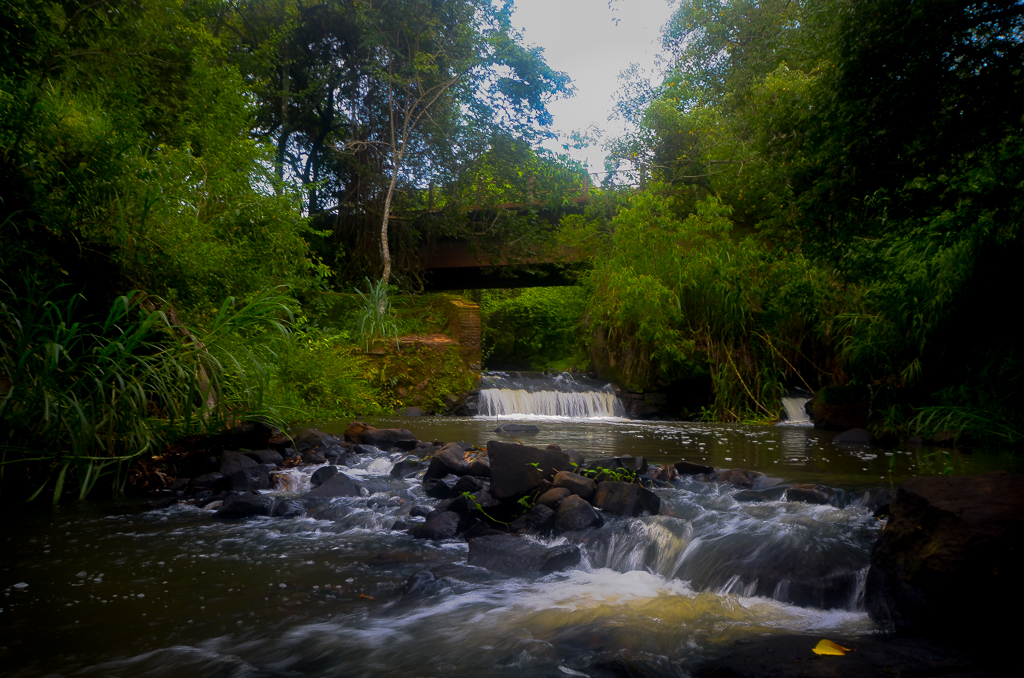
Rio das Pedras in Pirassununga, São Paulo.

== Demographics ==
Historical population (municipality)
Year	Population	%±
1920	19,692
1940	22,921	16.4%
1950	26,081	13.8%
1960	27,510	5.5%
1970	37,577	36.6%
1980	44,970	19.7%
1991	56,746	26.2%
2000	64,864	14.3%
2010	70,081	8.0%
2022	73,545	4.9%

== Exports ==
=== Cachaça ===
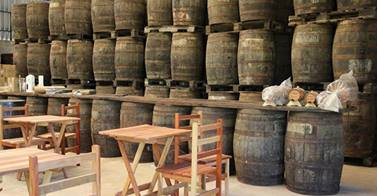
Cachaça Sapucaia Barrels in Pirassununga

Pirassununga is home to three sugar cane distilleries, Pirassununga 51 Cachaça, Cachaça Sapucaia, and Pirassununga Cachaça. The most popular brand, Pirassununga 51 Cachaça, was founded in 1959, just one year after Brazil had won its first FIFA Soccer World Cup. Pirassununga 51 Cachaça became a household name in the country during the 70s. "51, uma boa ideia," which translates to "51, a good idea," soon became a phrase in popular culture. It was not until the 1990s that Pirassununga 51 Cachaça became an export to other parts of the world. Cachaça is used as the spirit of choice for Brazil's national cocktail, the caipirinha.

== Tourist Spots ==
=== Waterfall Emas ===
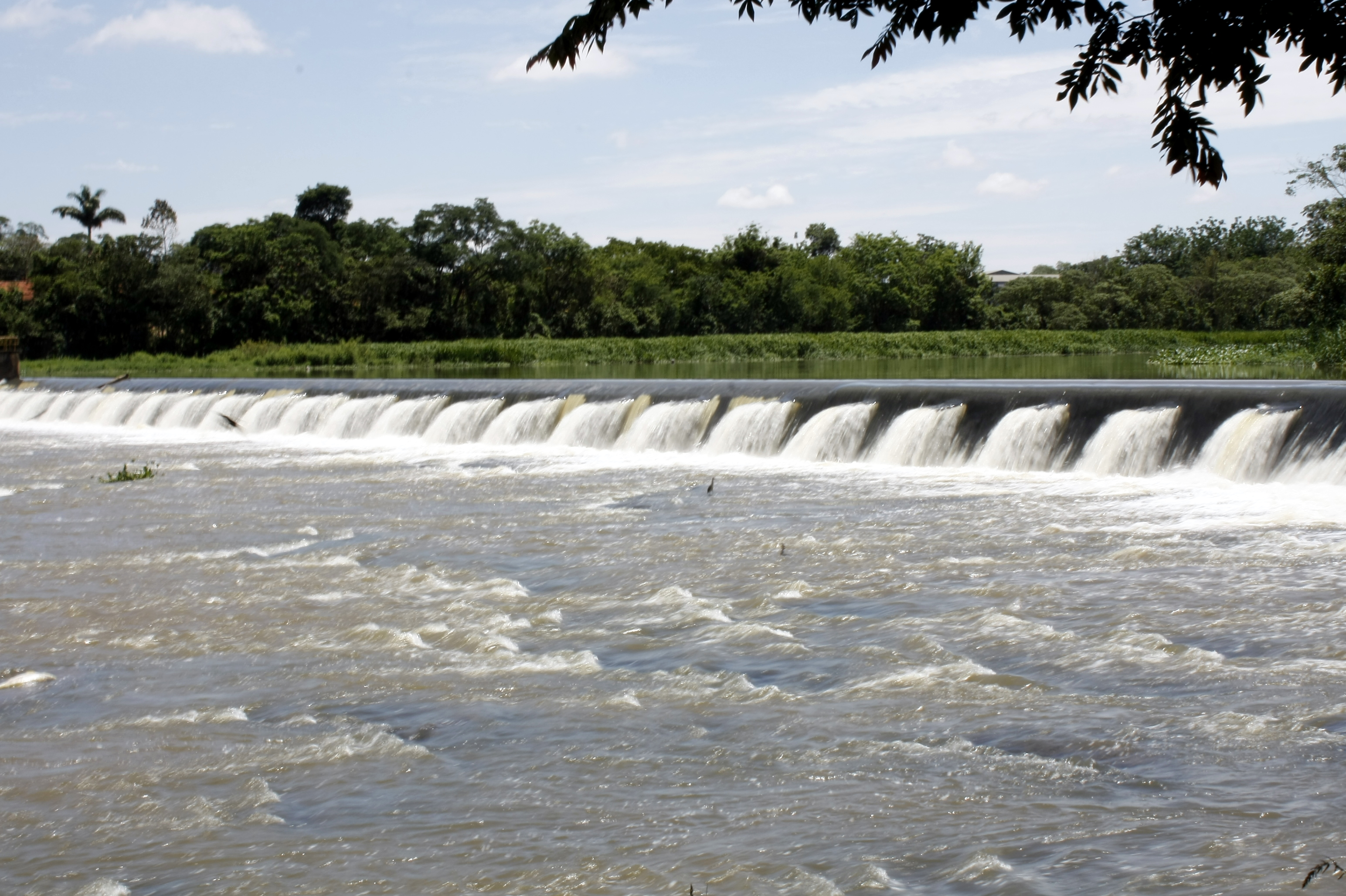
Waterfall Emas in Pirassununga, São Paulo.

Waterfall Emas serves as a hydroelectric plant to power the city of Pirassununga. In addition to supplying the city with electricity, it is a local fishing and boating destination. Houses can be rented nearby for fishermen to be near the water. Around Waterfall Emas, one can find many restaurants serving the local fish, dorado.

== Media ==
In telecommunications, the city was served by Telecomunicações de São Paulo. In July 1998, this company was acquired by Telefónica, which adopted the Vivo brand in 2012. The company is currently an operator of cell phones, fixed lines, internet (fiber optics/4G) and television (satellite and cable).

== Religion ==
Christianity is present in the city as follows:

=== Catholic Church ===
The Catholic church in the municipality is part of the Roman Catholic Diocese of Limeira.

=== Protestant Church ===
The most diverse evangelical beliefs are present in the city, mainly Pentecostal, including the Assemblies of God in Brazil (the largest evangelical church in the country), Christian Congregation in Brazil, among others. These denominations are growing more and more throughout Brazil.
