= Cachaça 51 =

Brazilian cachaça brand

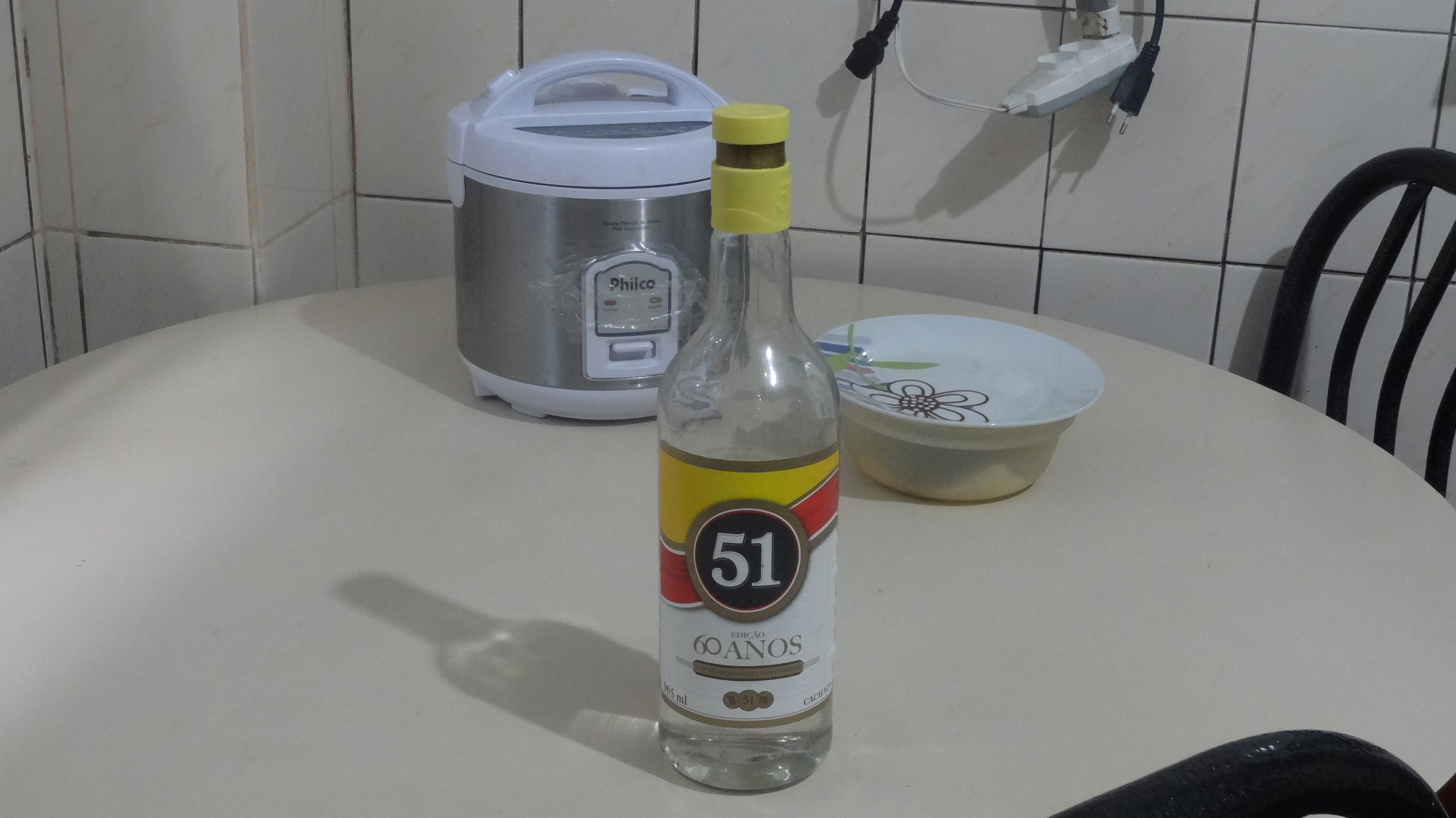
- 60th edition Cachaça 51 bottle
- Type: Cachaça
- Manufacturer: Companhia Müller de Bebidas
- Origin: Brazil, Pirassununga, São Paulo
- Introduced: 1959; 67 years ago
- Alcohol by volume: 39–40%
- Colour: Clear
- Flavour: Neutral
- Website: Official Website

Cachaça 51, also known as Caninha 51 or Pirassununga 51, is a Brazilian brand of cachaça, a distilled spirit made from fermented sugarcane juice. Produced by Companhia Müller de Bebidas, it is among the best-selling cachaça brands globally and one of the most widely distributed Brazilian spirits internationally.

Cachaça 51 is an unaged (branca) spirit, bottled at approximately 39–40% alcohol by volume (ABV), and is commonly used in the preparation of the caipirinha.

== History ==
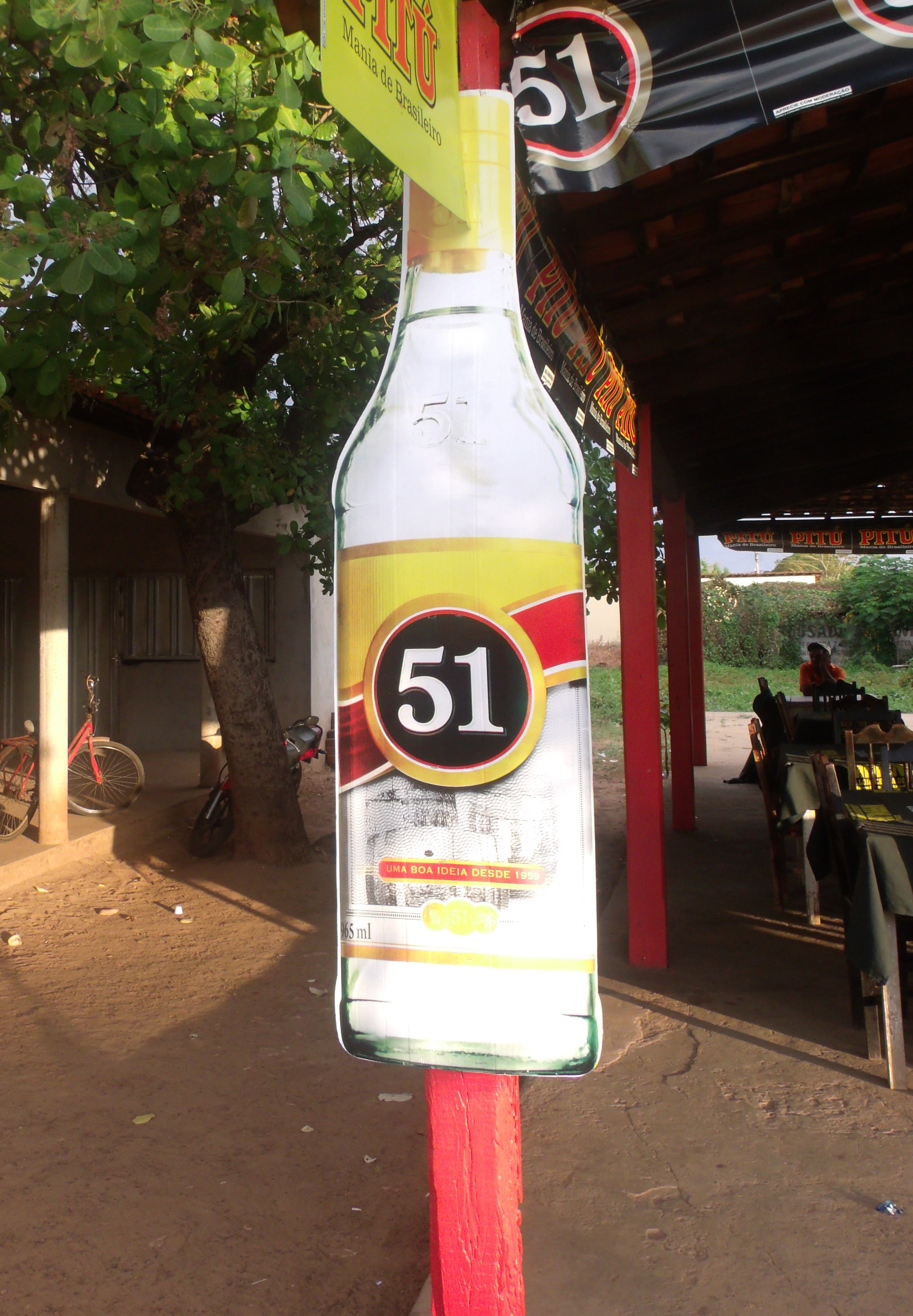
Cachaça 51 bottle advertisement

The brand was established in 1959 in Pirassununga, São Paulo, by Guilherme Müller, a German-Brazilian entrepreneur who founded Companhia Müller de Bebidas. According to the official history printed on the brand's labels, the number "51" refers to the best barrels of cachaça produced in Pirassununga; researchers note, however, that it was common practice at the time for cachaças from the São Paulo interior to be numbered arbitrarily. Records also indicate that prior to Müller's founding of the company, another cachaça called "51" had been produced in Pirassununga by a firm called Tabôas & Cia, whose number referred to the factory's telephone number; there is no evidence that Müller acquired the name from this predecessor.

A popular narrative, particularly among supporters of Palmeiras, holds that the brand was created in honor of the club's victory in the 1951 Copa Rio. This account is disputed by researchers and by the club itself. A cachaça called Palmeiras 51 did exist, but was produced in Santa Cruz das Palmeiras, a separate municipality, rather than in Pirassununga. The prevailing scholarly view is that this product used the number 51 to associate itself with the already well-known Pirassununga cachaça, and that the name referred to the town rather than the football club.

The company expanded in subsequent decades alongside growing demand for bottled cachaça and investments in industrial-scale production. In the 1970s, the advertising slogan "Uma Boa Ideia" ("A Good Idea") was introduced and became widely associated with the brand in Brazil. The slogan was created in 1978 by advertising executive and visual artist Magy Imoberdor.

By the 1990s, Companhia Müller had established a leading domestic market position and begun exporting internationally. The brand later expanded its portfolio to include flavored beverages and ready-to-drink products such as 51 Ice.

In 2021, Cachaça 51 received the "Marca de Alto Renome" (well-known trademark) designation from Brazil's National Institute of Industrial Property (INPI).

== Production ==
Cachaça 51 is produced from fresh sugarcane juice, distinguishing it from most rums, which are typically made from molasses. It undergoes continuous column distillation, enabling large-scale output and consistent flavor. The spirit is unaged, resulting in a clear product with a relatively neutral profile. The company operates two production facilities: one in Pirassununga and another in Cabo de Santo Agostinho, with a combined reported distillation capacity of 300 million litres per year.

== Usage ==
The brand is most commonly associated with the caipirinha, prepared with lime, sugar, and ice. It is also used in fruit-based mixed drinks such as batidas.

== Market and distribution ==
Cachaça 51 holds a significant share of the domestic cachaça market, accounting for approximately 33% of national cachaça sales, and is distributed across more than one million points of sale in Brazil. In the city of São Paulo alone, it accounts for more than 50% of total cachaça consumed. The brand is exported to over 50 countries, including Portugal, Spain, Germany, Italy, Switzerland, the United States, Chile, and Japan. It is positioned domestically as an affordable product; retail prices for a 965 ml bottle have been reported in the range of approximately R$12 to R$25 depending on region and channel.

== Marketing ==
The cachaça category has faced increasing competition from beer, vodka, and whisky, particularly among younger consumers. Industry data indicate declining cachaça sales in the early 2010s, while competing categories experienced growth. Vicente Bastos Ribeiro, president of the Brazilian Institute of Cachaça (IBRAC), described the category as having historically lagged in marketing modernization, stating that cachaça had been "very old-fashioned, stagnant in terms of packaging, labels, and marketing activities" (original: "a cachaça era muito antiquada, estava estacionada em termos de embalagens, rótulos e ações de marketing"). In response, producers including Companhia Müller de Bebidas invested in updated branding, packaging, and advertising strategies aimed at younger and higher-income audiences, with campaigns emphasizing lifestyle associations, social media engagement, and the caipirinha as a national cocktail.

Cachaça 51 has pursued international brand exposure through product placement on several occasions. In 2013, a bottle appeared in multiple scenes of the American television series The Big Bang Theory in the episode "The Closure Alternative" (season 6). Marketing professionals cited the placement as an effort to raise international awareness of both the brand and cachaça as a category. In May 2024, the brand appeared in the Japanese anime series Bartender: Glass of God, in a scene depicting the preparation of a caipirinha in which the full label of Cachaça 51 is visible. Japan is among the brand's primary export markets.

== Controversies ==
=== European Union trademark dispute ===
Companhia Müller de Bebidas successfully obtained the cancellation of the European Union trademark registration of a competing Brazilian cachaça brand, "61 - A Nossa Alegria", on the grounds that its visual and phonetic similarity to Cachaça 51 posed a risk of consumer confusion. The case was decided by the General Court of the European Union, which found that similarities in the visual appearance, phonetics, and conceptual framing of the two marks were sufficient to constitute a likelihood of confusion among average consumers across multiple EU member states where Cachaça 51 held prior registration, including Portugal, Denmark, Spain, the United Kingdom, and Austria. The registration of Cachaça 61 in the European market was subsequently cancelled.

== Cultural significance ==
Cachaça 51 is among the more recognizable cachaça brands in Brazil and has contributed to the broader domestic and international visibility of the category, including the popularization of the caipirinha in international bar settings.

== See also ==
- Cachaça
- Caipirinha
- Companhia Müller de Bebidas
- List of Cachaça brands
