= Cabana Cachaça =

Brand of Brazilian-made cachaça

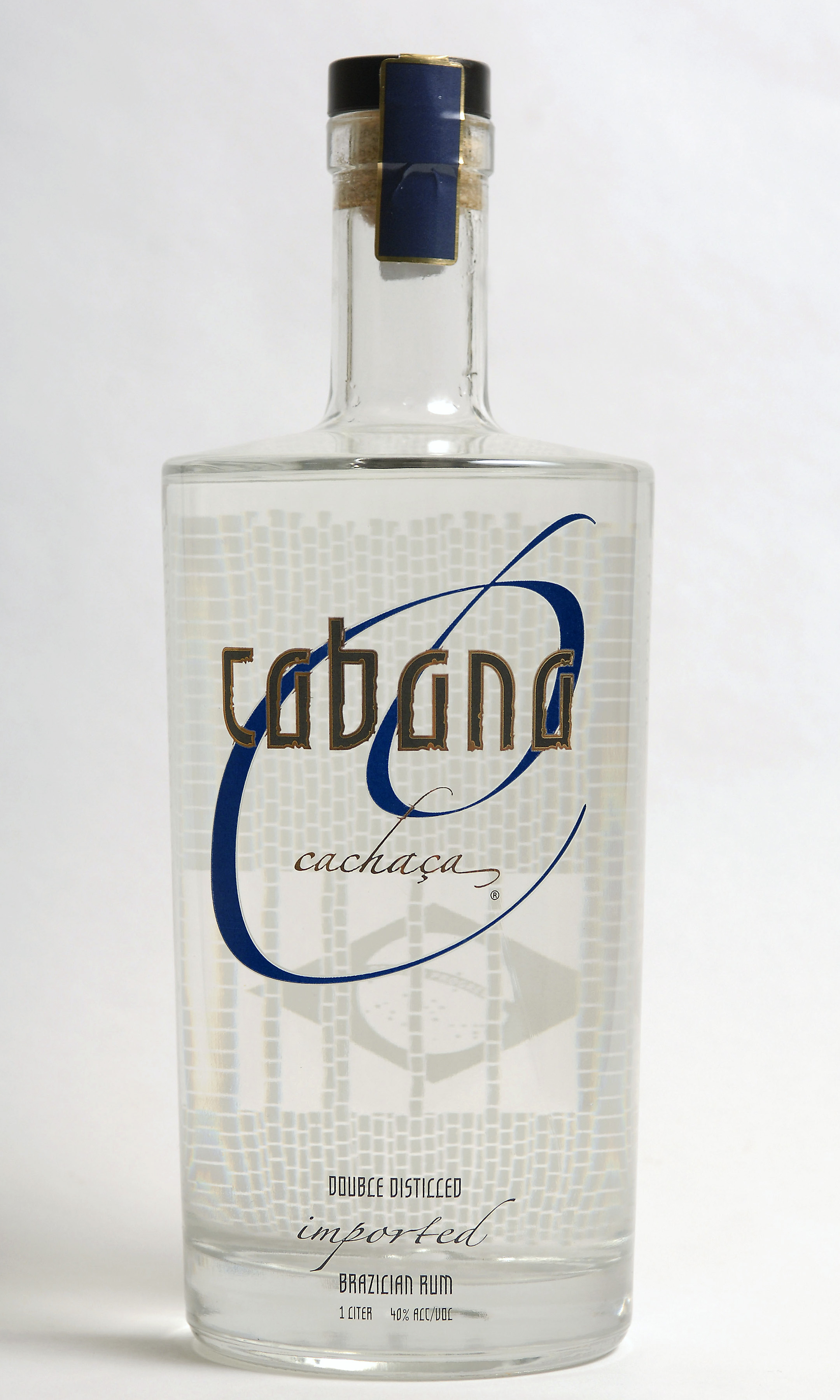
Bottle of Cabana Cachaça

Cabana Cachaça is a brand of Brazilian-made cachaça that is fermented and distilled directly from freshly pressed sugarcane.

== History ==
Cabana Cachaca was launched in the United States in 2006 by entrepreneur Matti Anttila. Although the third most distilled spirit in the world, cachaça, the national spirit of Brazil, was relatively unknown in the United States until recently, but is now one of the fastest growing spirits categories in the country. Similar to rum, but distilled directly from freshly pressed sugar cane, cachaça is an ingredient in a caipirinha cocktail. Cabana is currently sold throughout the United States in well known venues including Morton's Steakhouse, Fleming's, Roy's and Hilton Hotels. It is also available in Brazil and the UK.

== Production ==
Cabana is distilled directly from the first pressing of freshly hand cut sugar cane, as opposed to molasses, which most rum is produced from. Two small-batch distillations of the fermented natural cane juice in pot stills – as opposed to the large column stills used for continuous distillation by most producers – allow the master distiller greater control over each distillate. After six months of mellowing in native Brazilian wood barrels, the resulting spirit is a refined spirit offering a delicate citrus nose and a smooth round finish.

== Awards ==
Cabana Cachaça was rated as one of the top 50 spirits in the world for 2011 by Wine Enthusiast Magazine and captured a double gold medal at the San Francisco World Spirits Competition. The brand also received a 94-point rating by influential spirits critic Anthony Dias Blue.
