= Beija Cachaça =

Beija Cachaça is a Brazilian cachaça produced in the facilities outside São Paulo, Brazil. It is imported exclusively by Beija Corp. Beija is an 80 proof, clear artisan cachaça that is distilled in Brazil. Beija was granted status as 'The World's First Virgin Cane Rum' by the Alcohol and Tobacco Tax and Trade Bureau in the summer of 2007.

The sugarcane used to create Beija is hand-harvested, pressed and enters distillation within at most 10 hours from the time it was harvested. The product is distilled a single time in small batches and is not aged in wooden barrels of any kind.

== Origin of name ==
The name Beija is a conjugation of the Portuguese verb Beijar, meaning 'to kiss'. Beija translates to English as ‘She Kisses’.

== History ==
Beija Cachaça was launched in January 2008 by Kevin Beardsley and Steve Diforio.

== Distillation ==
Beija Cachaça is a handcrafted blend of un-aged artisanal cachaças. Sourced from Minas Gerais and São Paulo, Beija's sugarcane is hand harvested, single pressed, and enters distillation on the same day, ensuring cachaça in the purest form.

== Awards ==
- "Outstanding – 92 Points" by Tasting Panel Magazine
- Best in Class at the 2009 New York Spirits Awards
- Gold Medal at the 2008 International Rum Festival
