= Amázzoni Gin =

Brazilian gin

- Type: Gin
- Manufacturer: Pernod Ricard
- Origin: Brazil, Barra Mansa, Rio de Janeiro
- Introduced: 2016; 10 years ago
- Alcohol by volume: 42%
- Proof (US): 84
- Colour: Clear

Amázzoni Gin is a Brazilian gin produced in the state of Rio de Janeiro. Founded by Alexandre Mazza, Arturo Isola, and Tato Giovannoni, the company produces craft gin using traditional gin botanicals and Brazilian ingredients.

The brand was developed in 2015 by Isola and Mazza, who initially experimented with homemade distillation recipes in Rio de Janeiro before expanding production commercially with Argentine mixologist Tato Giovannoni. Commercial production began in 2016 at a distillery established on a former coffee farm in the Paraíba Valley region of Rio de Janeiro state.

In 2018, the company won the World's Best Craft Producer award at the World Gin Awards in London. Its Rio Negro expression later received a Double Gold Medal at the 2019 San Francisco World Spirits Competition.

In October 2018, French beverage company Pernod Ricard acquired a minority stake in Amázzoni. By 2021, the brand had become part of Pernod Ricard's portfolio.

== Production ==
Amázzoni Gin is produced at a distillery located in the Paraíba Valley region of Rio de Janeiro state on a former coffee farm that was later converted for gin production. The facility has been described in trade publications as Brazil's first distillery dedicated exclusively to gin production.

The gin is distilled from cereal alcohol. Its recipe combines traditional gin botanicals such as juniper, coriander seed, bay leaf, and citrus peel with Brazilian ingredients including cocoa, Brazil nut, maxixe, cipó-cravo, pink pepper, tangerine peel, and Victoria amazonica seed.

Some ingredients used in production are sourced from communities in the Amazon region, and company materials have stated that part of the brand's proceeds support rainforest conservation initiatives.

== Distribution ==
Amázzoni initially expanded distribution within Brazil before entering export markets including Italy, Portugal, the United States, and parts of Asia.

In the United States, the brand is imported by The Folclore Company (formerly East Brazil Company) and has been distributed through partnerships with companies including Brescome Barton. Amázzoni has also been marketed alongside other Brazilian beverage brands such as Cãna Cachaça and Dom Maria Brazilian Brut.

In 2018, Pernod Ricard acquired a minority stake in the company, and by 2021 the brand had become part of Pernod Ricard's portfolio.

In 2024, Metagroup announced a partnership to distribute Amázzoni in Asian markets including China and Japan.

== Awards and recognition ==
Amázzoni was named World's Best Craft Producer at the 2018 World Gin Awards in London.

The brand's Rio Negro expression received a Double Gold Medal at the 2019 San Francisco World Spirits Competition.

At the 2020 World Gin Awards, Amázzoni Rio Negro was recognized in the Contemporary Style Gin category.

== See also ==
- Gin
- Pernod Ricard
