= Cachaça Sapucaia =

Brazilian brand of cachaça

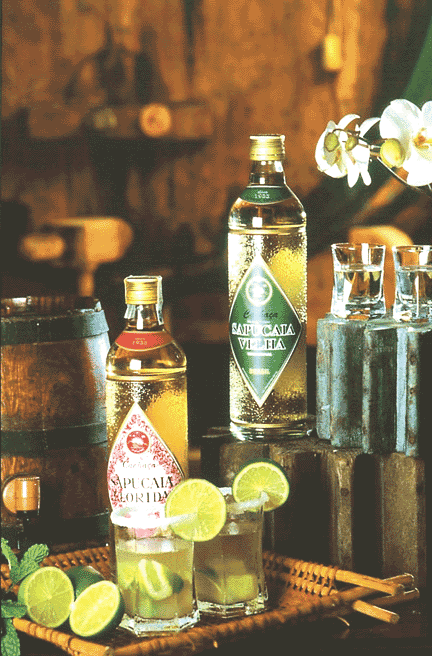
- Caipirinha and Cachaça Bottles
- Headquarters: Pindamonhangaba, São Paulo, Brazil
- Website: www.cachacasapucaia.com.br

Cachaça Sapucaia is a specialty brand of cachaça produced in Pindamonhangaba, São Paulo, Brazil, since 1933.

== Production ==
The fermentation agent is maize flour (called fubá in Portuguese) and the distillation unit is a copper pot still. The resulting product comes out in 3 batches: "head", "core" and "tail". Sapucaia Cachaça uses only the "core", discarding the other two which have undesirable components.

Sapucaia cachaça is produced in five varieties:

- Sapucaia Florida — 2 years white (silver) and aged (gold)
- Sapucaia Traditional — 5 years (gold)
- Sapucaia Family Reserve — 10 years
- Sapucaia Royal — 18 years

The company has already made exports to the United States, South Africa and France and today maintains part of its sales abroad, to the Netherlands, Belgium, Luxembourg, France, Italy, Scotland, England, Austria and Vietnam and recently started operation in the Brazilian city best known for the production of cachaça, Pirassununga.

== See also ==
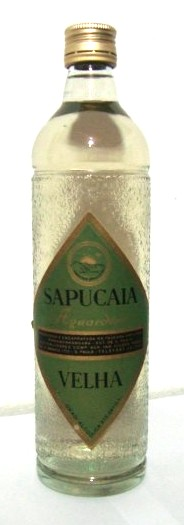
Original Sapucaia Bottle - 1933

- List of Brazilian dishes
- Caipirinha
- Cachaça
