= Cachaça =

Distilled beverage popular in Brazil

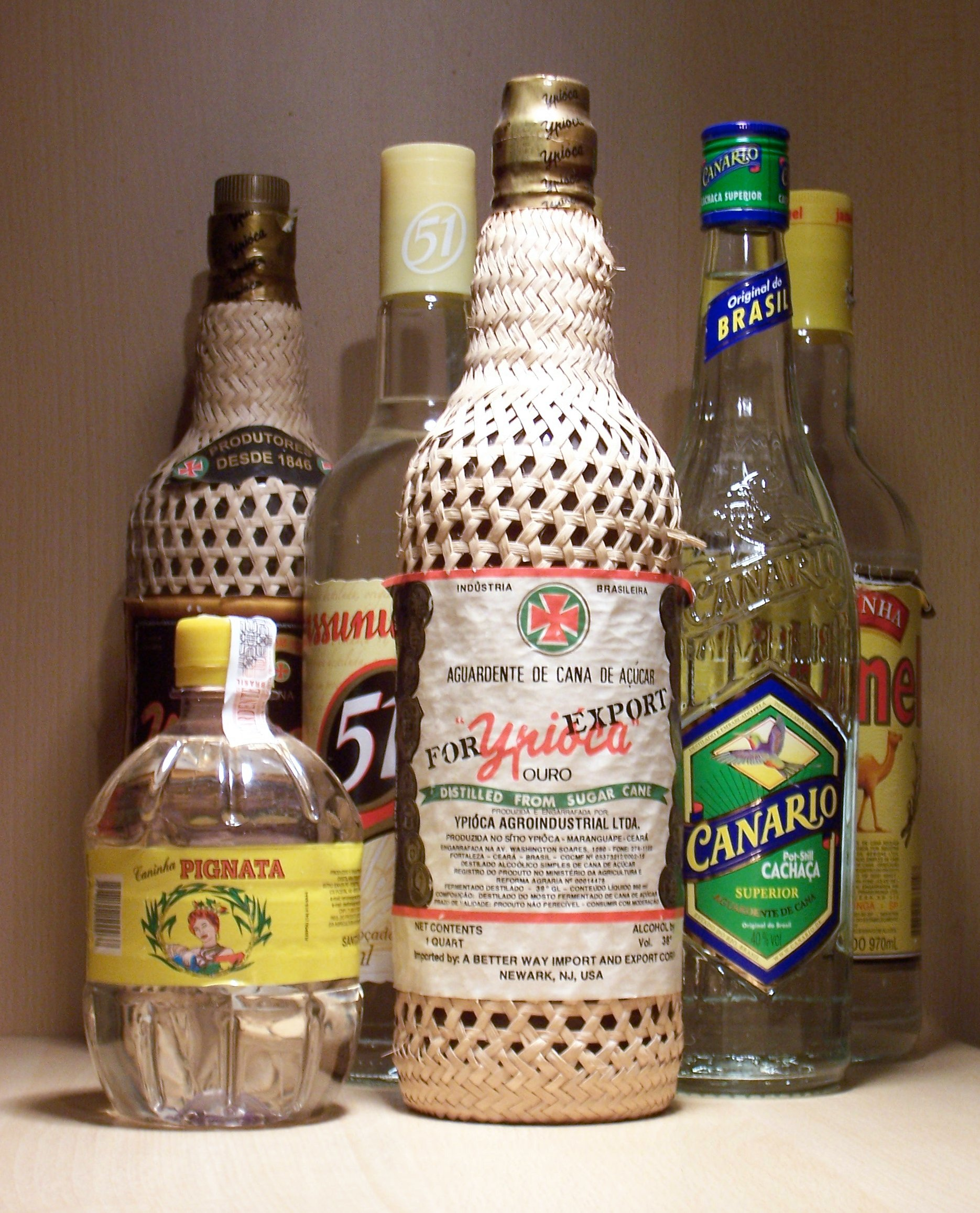
- Type: Distilled beverage
- Origin: Brazil
- Introduced: 16th century
- Alcohol by volume: 38–48%
- Colour: Clear, golden
- Ingredients: Sugarcane juice, yeast, water
- Related products: Rum

Cachaça (/kəˈʃɑːsə/ kə-SHAH-sə; Brazilian Portuguese pronunciation: [kaˈʃasɐ]) is a distilled spirit made from fermented sugarcane juice. Also known as pinga, caninha, and other names, it is the most popular spirit in Brazil, and the most popular cane spirit in the world (though almost entirely due to domestic consumption). Outside Brazil, cachaça is used almost exclusively as an ingredient in tropical drinks, with the caipirinha being the most famous and popular cocktail. In Brazil, caipirinha is often paired with the dish feijoada.

== History ==
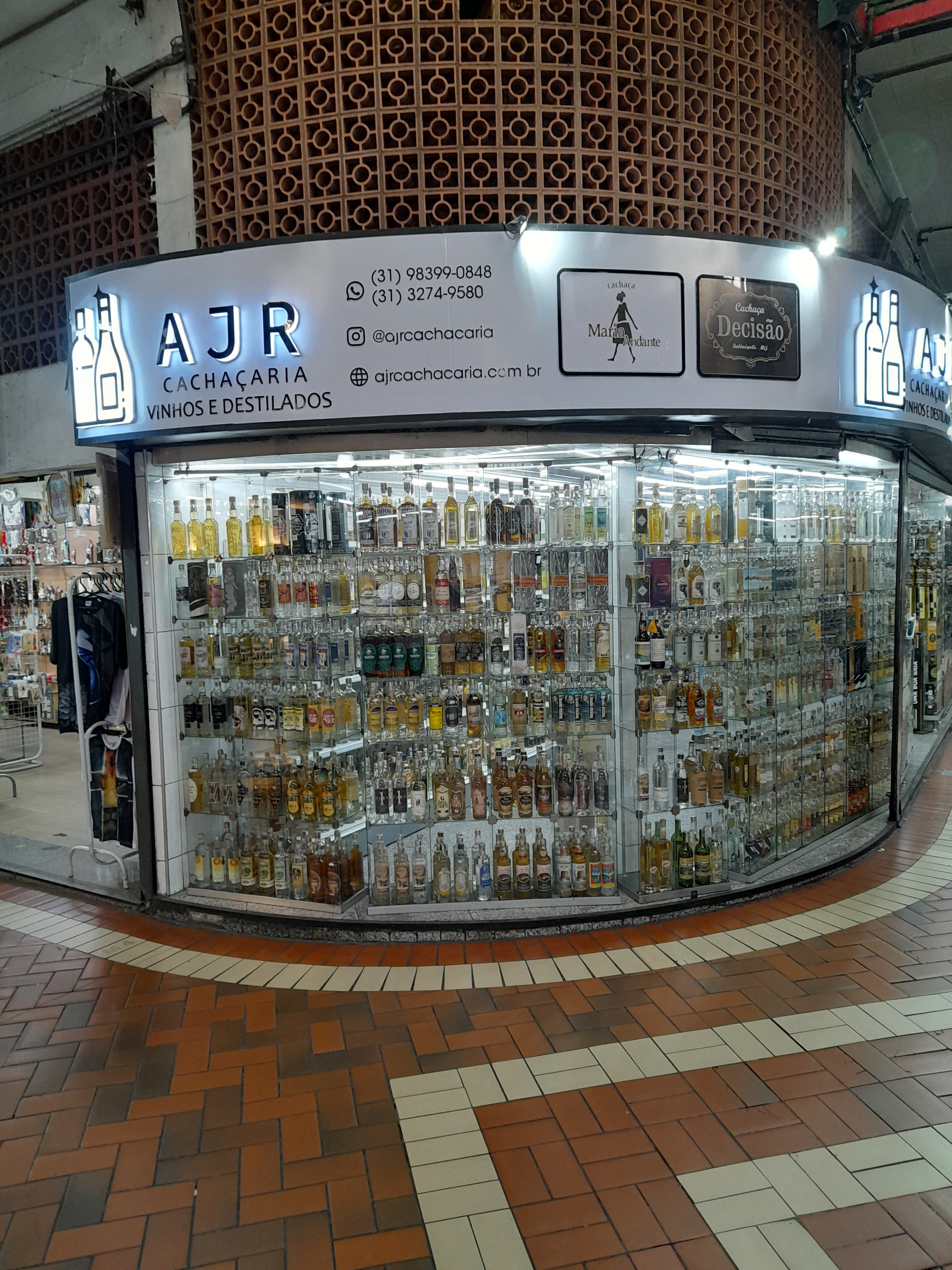
A cachaçaria in Minas Gerais, Brazil

Sugar production was mostly switched from the Madeira islands to Brazil by the Portuguese in the 16th century. In Madeira, aguardente de cana is made by distilling fermented sugar cane juice into liquor, and the pot stills from Madeira were brought to Brazil to make what today is also called cachaça. The process dates from 1532, when one of the Portuguese colonists brought the first cuttings of sugar cane to Brazil from Madeira.

In the beginning of the 17th century, the producers of sugar from various European colonies in the Americas used the by-products of sugar, molasses, and scummings as the raw material for the production of alcoholic spirits. The resulting beverage was known by several names: in British colonies, it was named rum; in France, tafia; in Spain, aguardiente de caña; and in Portugal (Brazil), aguardente da terra, aguardente de cana and later cachaça (locals also call it "Pinga", which translates to drip).

Cachaça's popularity soon exceeded even that of bagaceira, a grape brandy from Portugal. In response to this, in 1635, the king of Portugal banned production of the spirit, with restrictions reaffirmed and heavy taxation levied in 1659. This caused the Revolta da Cachaça (Cachaça Rebellion) from 1660 to 1661, which lead to the legalization of cachaça on September 13, 1661, a day that is now celebrated as Cachaça Day.

Throughout its history, cachaça was instrumental to the Atlantic slave trade, where Portuguese colonies sent cachaça to Europe, which sent money to Africa, which sent slaves to the colonies.

By the turn of the millennium, the Brazilian government began efforts to support the cachaça industry. In 1992, Pró-Cachaça, a program to encourage the expansion of cachaça production, was passed by the Brazilian government, and the following year, the government officially defined cachaça, caninha, and aguardente de cana. Later, in 2005, the government defined the technical specifications of what qualifies as cachaça, and in 2007, the geographical indication for cachaça was created. The United States recognized the Brazilian definition for cachaça in 2013.

As of 2025, 292.46 million liters of cachaça were produced, of which 6.66 million liters were exported. The main export markets of cachaça are the United States, France, Germany, and Paraguay.

=== Synonyms ===
For more than four centuries of history, cachaça has accumulated synonyms and creative nicknames coined by the Brazilian people. Some of these words were created for the purpose of deceiving the authorities in the days when cachaça was banned in Brazil. There are more than two thousand words to refer to the Brazilian national distillate. Some of these nicknames are: abre-coração (heart-opener), água-benta (holy water), bafo-de-tigre (tiger breath), and limpa-olho (eye-wash).

== Production ==
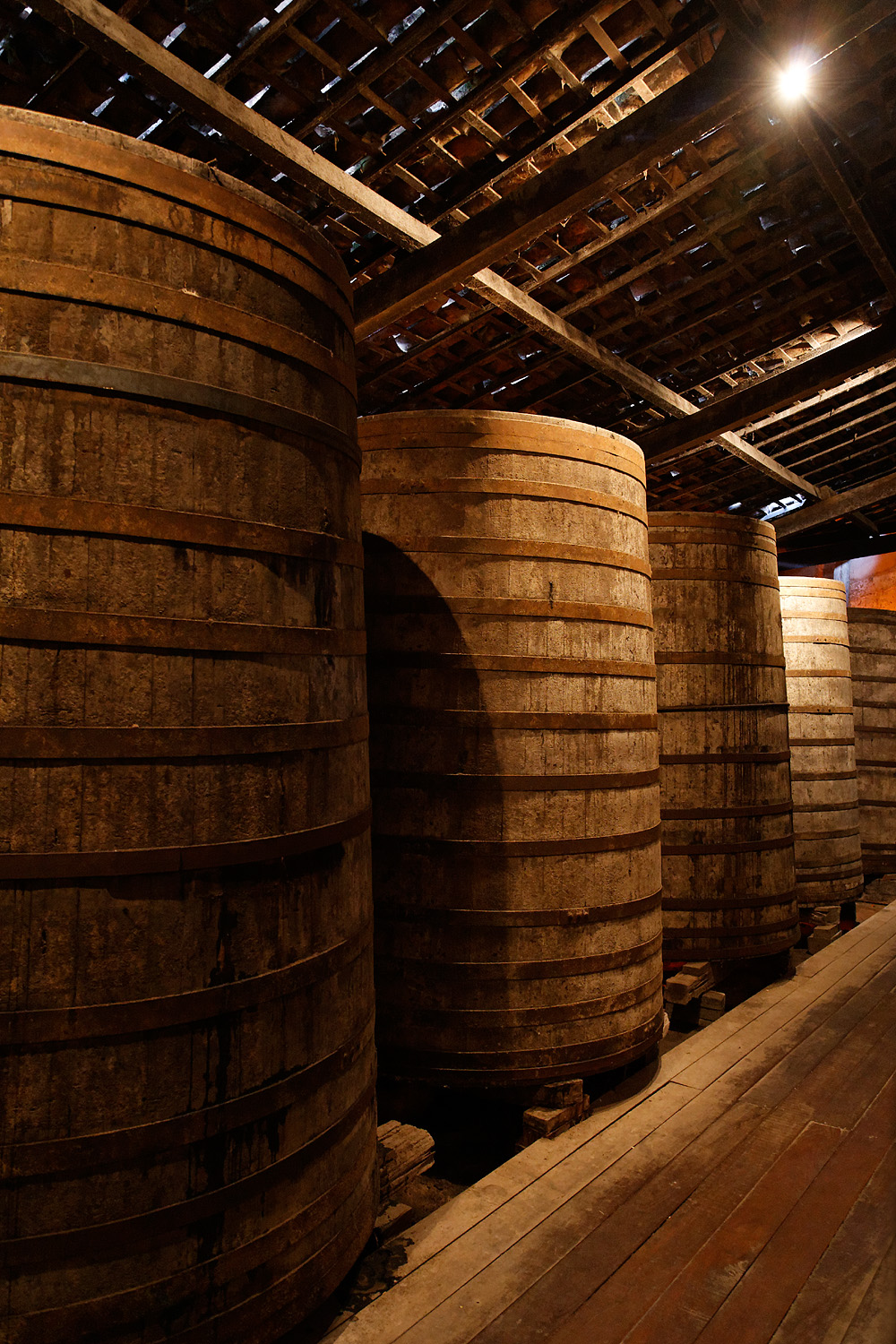
Barrels of cachaça

The name "cachaça" is legally protected; it can only be produced in Brazil, where, according to 2007 figures, 1,500,000,000 litres (396,000,000 US gal; 330,000,000 imp gal) are consumed annually, compared with 15,000,000 litres (3,960,000 US gal; 3,300,000 imp gal) outside the country. In Brazil, there are regions where fine pot still cachaça is produced, such as Salinas in Minas Gerais state, Chã Grande in Pernambuco state, Paraty in Rio de Janeiro state, Monte Alegre do Sul in São Paulo, Luiz Alves in Santa Catarina state, and Abaíra in Bahia state. Nowadays, producers of cachaça can be found in most Brazilian regions, and in 2011, there were over 40,000 of them.

=== Variations ===
Cachaça can sometimes be aged in a solera style. Cachaça that is clear in color (whether aged or unaged) can be called (Portuguese: branca, "white" or prata, "silver") and aged cachaça that keeps its color can be called (amarela, "yellow" or ouro, "gold").

By far, the most produced cachaça is "industrial" cachaça, which is distilled on a continuous column still, and is far more neutral in flavor. Artisanal cachaça is produced on a pot still, and is associated with more flavor and a higher quality product.

=== Legal specifications ===
- Distillation: Cachaça can be distilled in either alembic pot stills or column stills. When it is distilled exclusively in an alembic pot still, it can be called cachaça de alambique.
- Aging: Cachaça can be unaged, but if it is aged, it must be aged in barrels that do not exceed 700 liters. If at least 50% of the contents is aged for one year, it can be called cachaça envelhecida. If the full contents is aged for one year, it can be called cachaça premium. If the full contents is aged for three years, it can be called cachaça extra premium.
- Sweetening: Cachaça is permitted to have up to 6g/L of added sugar. It can have less than 30g/L of added sugar if it is labeled as cachaça adoçada.
- Bottling: Cachaça is required to be bottled between 38% and 48% alcohol by volume.
- Other limits: Cachaça must have a maximum of 150mg/100mL of volatile acidity, 200mg/100mL of esters, 30mg/100mL of aldehydes, 5mg/100mL of Furfural, 360mg/100mL of higher alcohols, and 650mg/100mL of congeners.

Unlike some other rum geographical indications, Brazilian law does not specify a particular yeast strain to use for fermenting the sugarcane juice for cachaça, there are no restrictions on still type, size, configuration, or plates, and there is no maximum distillation ABV.

=== Copper contamination ===
The legal limit of copper in cachaça is 5mg/L. Cachaça is produced in copper stills, and levels of copper in homemade cachaças can exceed the legal limits established by Brazilian law. Some copper is considered desirable in the distillation process as a catalyst for the oxidation of sulfur compounds produced by fermentation, but the levels must be controlled by adequate maintenance and cleaning of the still to remove accumulated verdigris. Adsorbents are used, but the most commonly used adsorbents, activated carbon and ion-exchange resin, have been shown to alter the chemical composition of cachaça. Sugarcane bagasse has been proposed as a selective adsorbent.

== Comparison to rum ==
Cachaça is also known as Brazilian rum. There is not a lot of difference between cachaça and rum (particularly rhum agricole). According to the West Indies Rum and Spirits Producers’ Association, "if the product is fermented from sugar cane juice, syrup or molasses and distilled below 96% alcohol it is rum, pure and simple." Cachaça is made from sugar cane juice, like some rums, it can be distilled in pot or column still like rums, and it can be sold unaged, or barrel aged, like rums. However, production of cachaça precedes Barbadian rum by many decades, leading some to say that rum is actually a type of cachaça.

During barrel aging, the wood used can have a large impact on the flavor, and a unique characteristic of cachaça is the employment of native Brazilian trees, such as zebrawood and amburana. However, many of these trees are endangered due to deforestation, so some Brazilian distillers, such as Ypióca, have begun aging in American oak ex-Bourbon barrels (the most common wood used in aging rum), and Novo Fogo has moved to discontinue use of native Brazilian wood entirely for their aged cachaças.

In the United States, cachaça is recognized as a type of rum and distinctive Brazilian product, after an agreement was signed in 2013 with Brazil in which it will drop the usage of the term "Brazilian rum", in exchange for Brazil recognizing Bourbon and Tennessee Bourbon as distinctive American products.

However, the United States, the world's largest importer of cachaça by value, still classifies it as a type of rum. Even so, cachaça can be sold in the US under its own name without being labeled "rum", provided it meets the US definition of rum (including an ABV of at least 40%).

== See also ==
- Guaro
- Cocktails with cachaça
- List of cachaça brands
- List of Brazilian drinks
