= Denominación de origen (Mexico) =

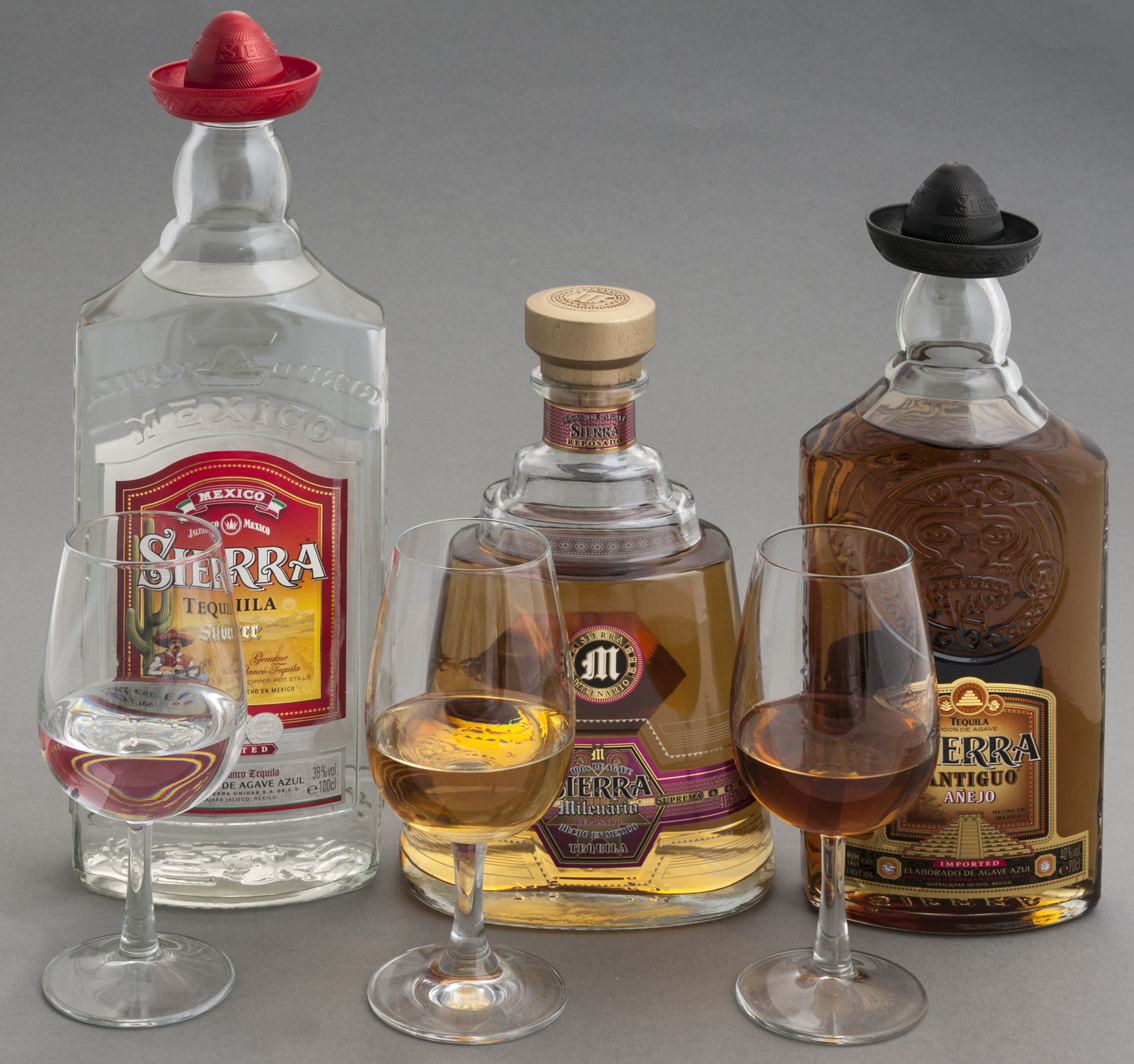
Tequila, the first Mexican denomination of origin.

The United Mexican States have 18 Designations of Origin (DO, Denominación de Origen in Spanish), granted by the Mexican Institute of Industrial Property (IMPI), which also issues declarations to protect the product, register the brand and authorize its use. However, these names are not created by the IMPI, but rather "exist because of factual situations; that is, they are first used, famous and recognized by the public that consumes them, and later, they are protected through the corresponding declaration".

The first denomination of origin declared in Mexico was tequila in 1974 (DO enjoyed by 181 municipalities distributed between Jalisco, Michoacán, Tamaulipas, Nayarit and Guanajuato), while the last was the Pluma coffee in 2020 (30 municipalities in Oaxaca).

== List ==
Image	Product	Year	Place
Food
	Veracruz coffee	2000	82 municipalities in Veracruz
	Chiapas coffee	2003	77 municipalities in Chiapas
	Ataúlfo mango	2003	13 municipalities in Soconusco region, Chiapas
	Papantla vanilla	2009	19 municipalities in Veracruz; 19 municipalities in Puebla (total of 38)
	Yucatan habanero chilli pepper	2008	All the municipalities that make up the State of Yucatán (106)
	Morelos Rice	2012	22 municipalities in Morelos
	Grijalva cocoa	2016	11 municipalities in Tabasco
	Yahualica chilli pepper	2018	9 municipalities in Jalisco; 2 municipalities in Zacatecas
Drinks
	Bacanora	1969	35 municipalities in Sonora
	Tequila	1969	125 municipalities in Jalisco; 30 municipalities in Michoacán; 11 municipalities in Tamaulipas; 8 municipalities in Nayarit; 7 municipalities in Guanajuato (total of 181)
	Mezcal	1994; 2001 2003; 2012; 2015; 2018	Aguascalientes (7 municipalities), Durango (39 m.), Guanajuato (2 m.), Guerrero (81 m.), State of México (15 m.), Michoacán (29 m.), Morelos (23 m.), Oaxaca (570 m.), Puebla (116 m.), San Luis Potosí (58 m.), Tamaulipas (11 m.), Zacatecas (58 m.) (total of 1009)
	Sotol	2002	All the municipalities that make up Chihuahua (67), Coahuila (38) and Durango (39)
	Charanda	2003	16 municipalities in Michoacán
	Raicilla	2019	16 municipalities in Jalisco; 1 municipality in Nayarit
Artesanías
	Olinalá lacquerware	1994	Olinalá, Guerrero
	Talavera pottery	1997	5 municipalities in Puebla
	Chiapan amber	2000; 2003	7 municipalities in Chiapas
