= Agave Landscape and Ancient Industrial Facilities of Tequila =

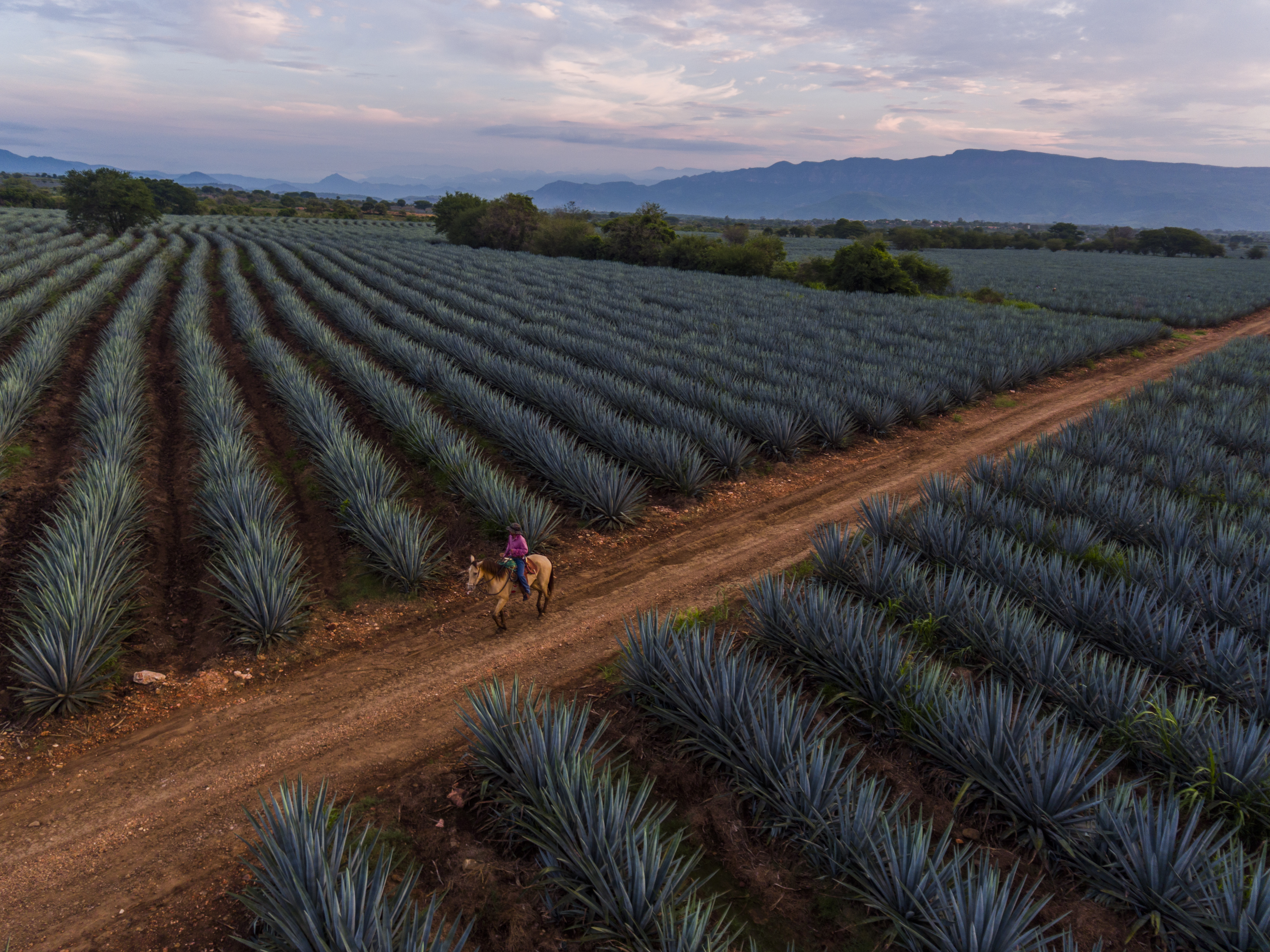
- Agave field near Tequila, Jalisco
- Interactive map of Agave Landscape and Ancient Industrial Facilities of Tequila
- 20.8595°N 103.7666°W
- Location: Valles Region, Jalisco

UNESCO World Heritage Site
- Type: Cultural
- Criteria: ii, iv, v, vi
- Designated: 2006 (30th session)
- Reference no.: 1209
- Region: Latin America and the Caribbean

The Agave Landscape and Ancient Industrial Facilities of Tequila is a cultural UNESCO World Heritage Site in Mexico. The 35,019-hectare site is part of an expansive landscape of blue agave, shaped by the culture of the plant used since the 16th century to produce the spirit known as tequila and for at least two millennia to make fermented drinks (such as pulque) and cloth. Within the landscape are working distilleries reflecting the growth in the consumption of tequila in the 19th and 20th centuries. Today, this agave culture is seen as part of Mexican national identity. The Tequila landscape has contributed to many works of art such as film, music, dance, and paintings.

The site includes the living, working agave fields and the urban settlements of Tequila, Magdalena, El Arenal and Amatitan. The area is also testimony to the Teuchitlan tradition (AD 200–900) which shaped the landscape through the creation of terraces for agriculture, housing, temples, ceremonial mounds and ball courts.

== Gallery ==
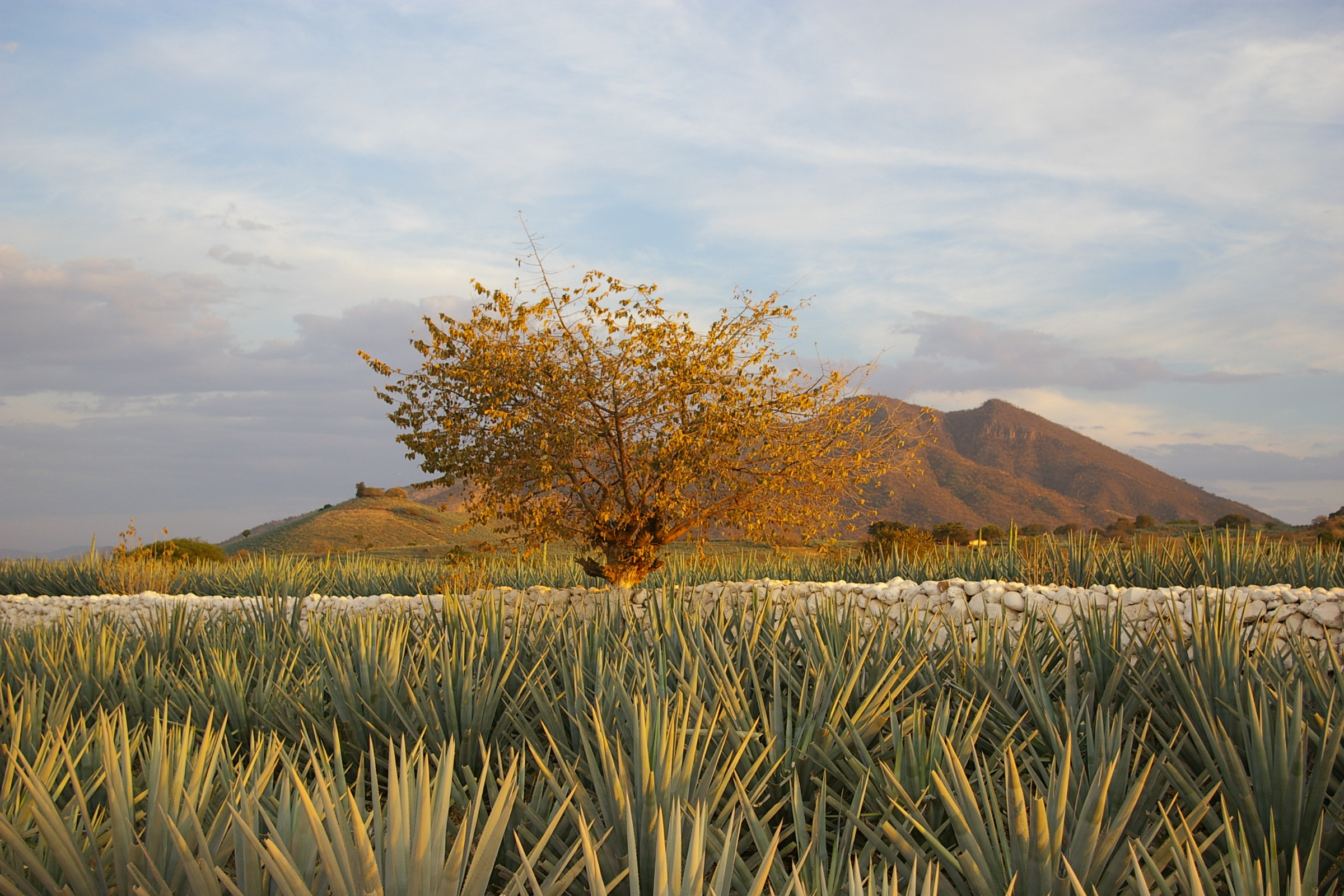

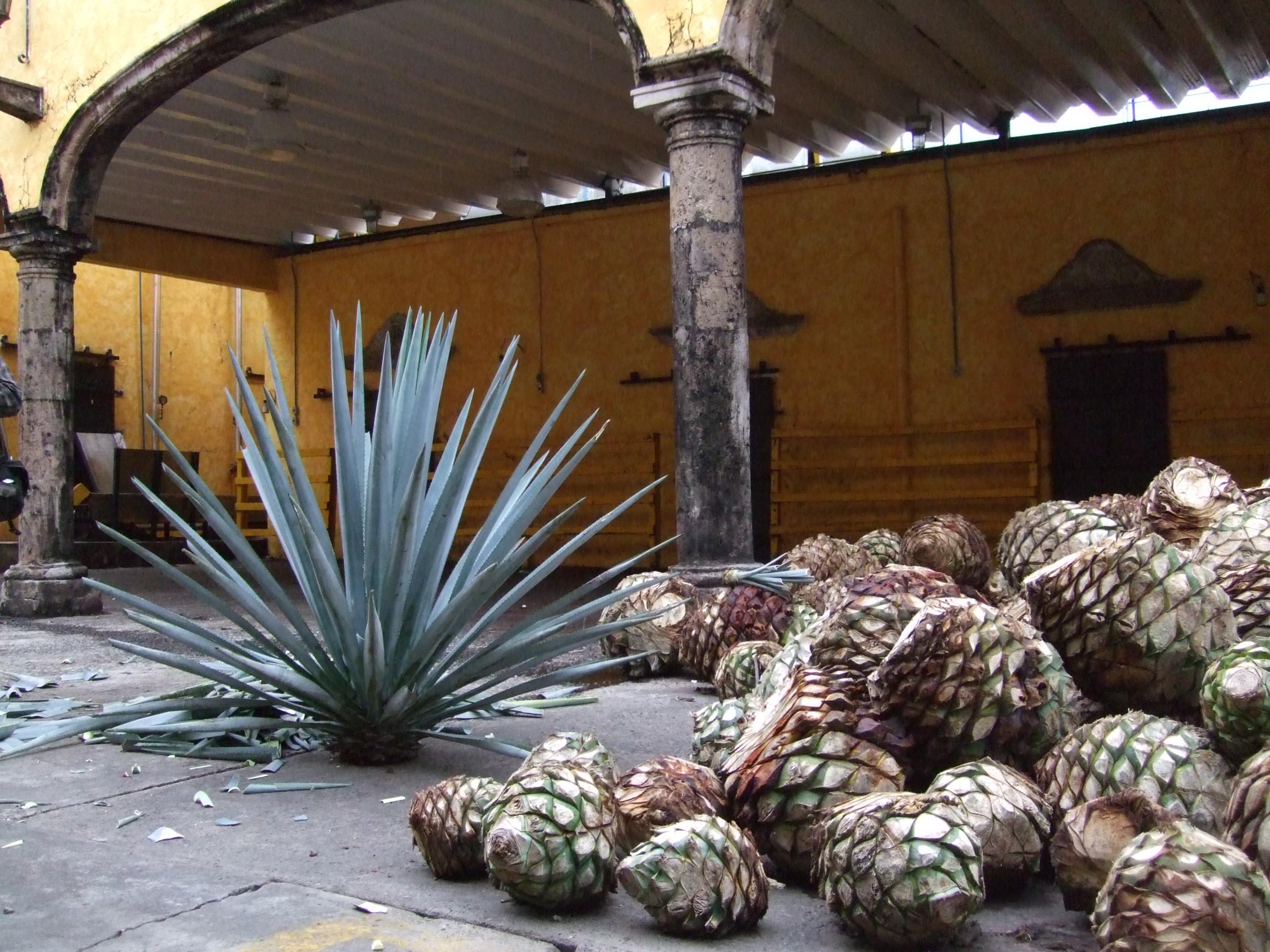

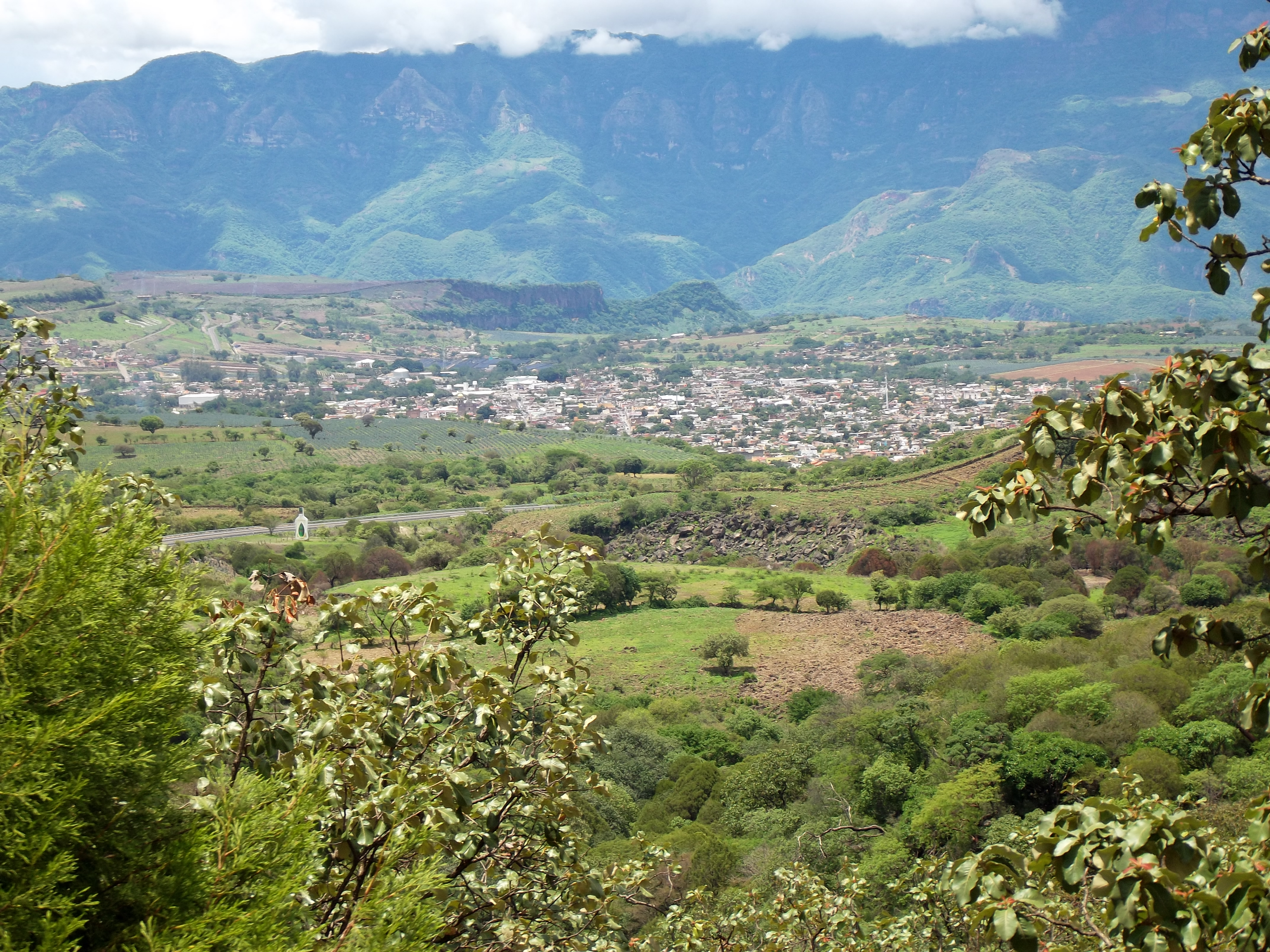
