= Olinalá (craftwork) =

Mexican lacquering technique

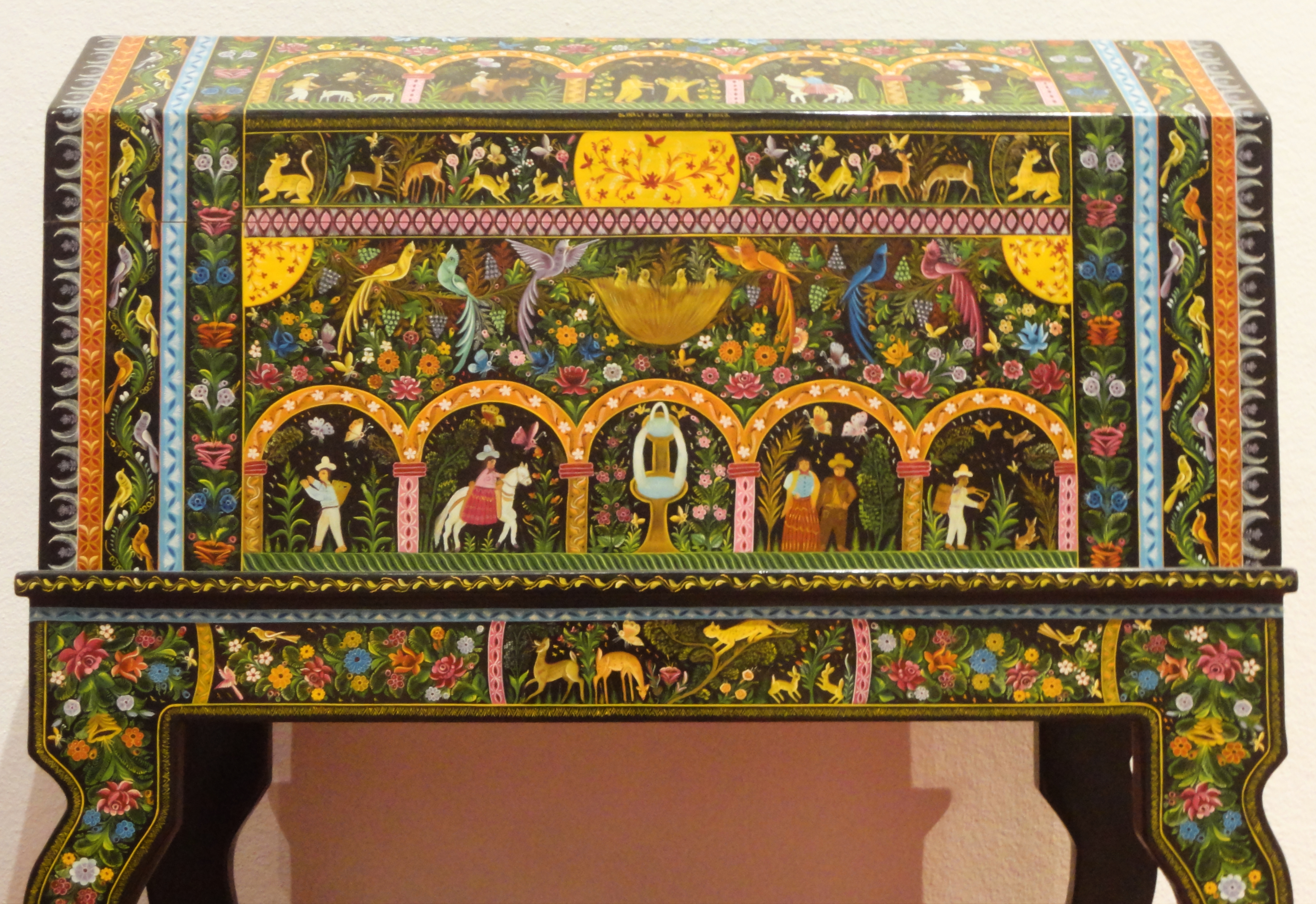
Olinalá wooden trunk

Different applications of olianá

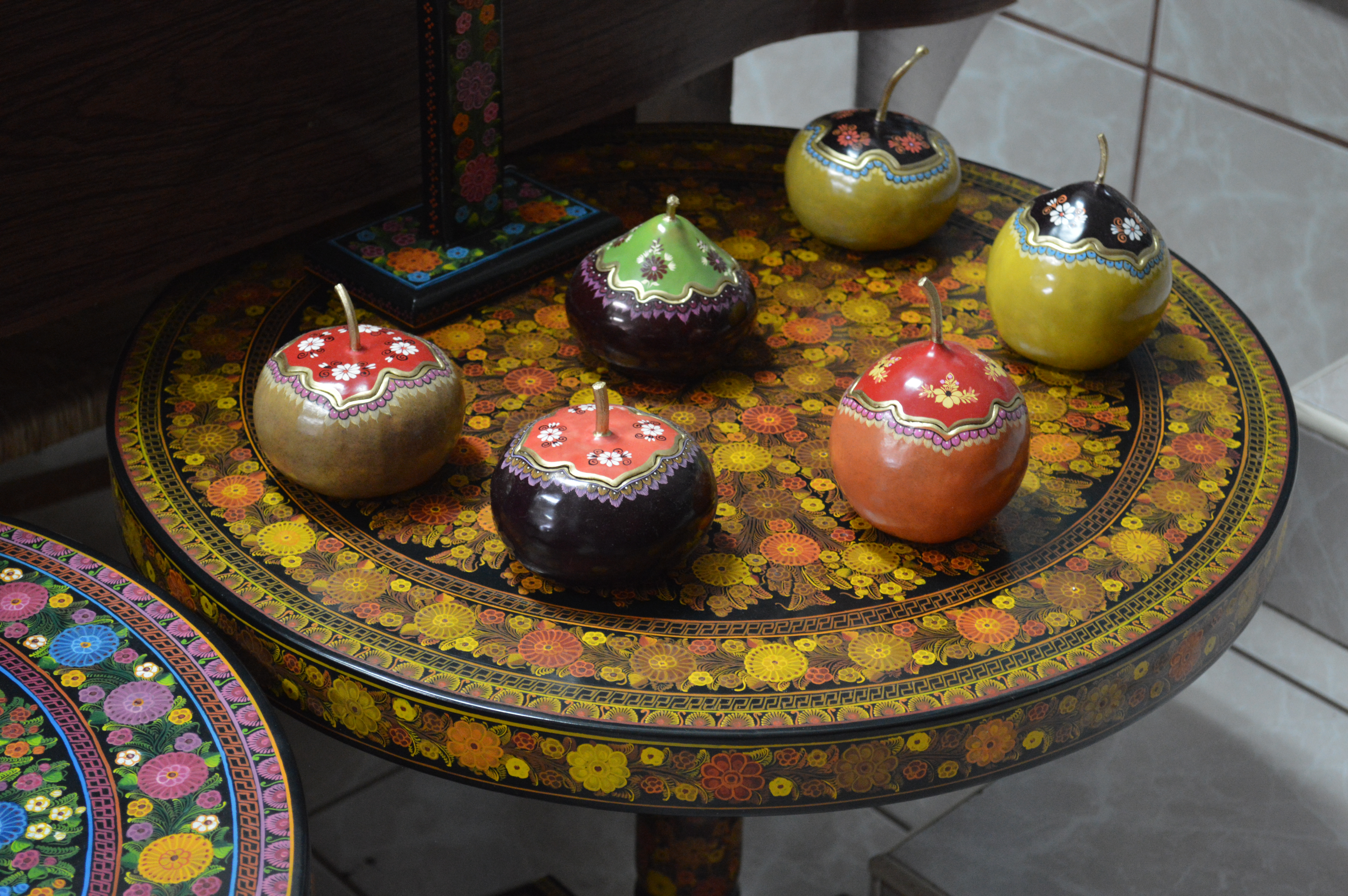
to jícaras (gourd bowls) and a table

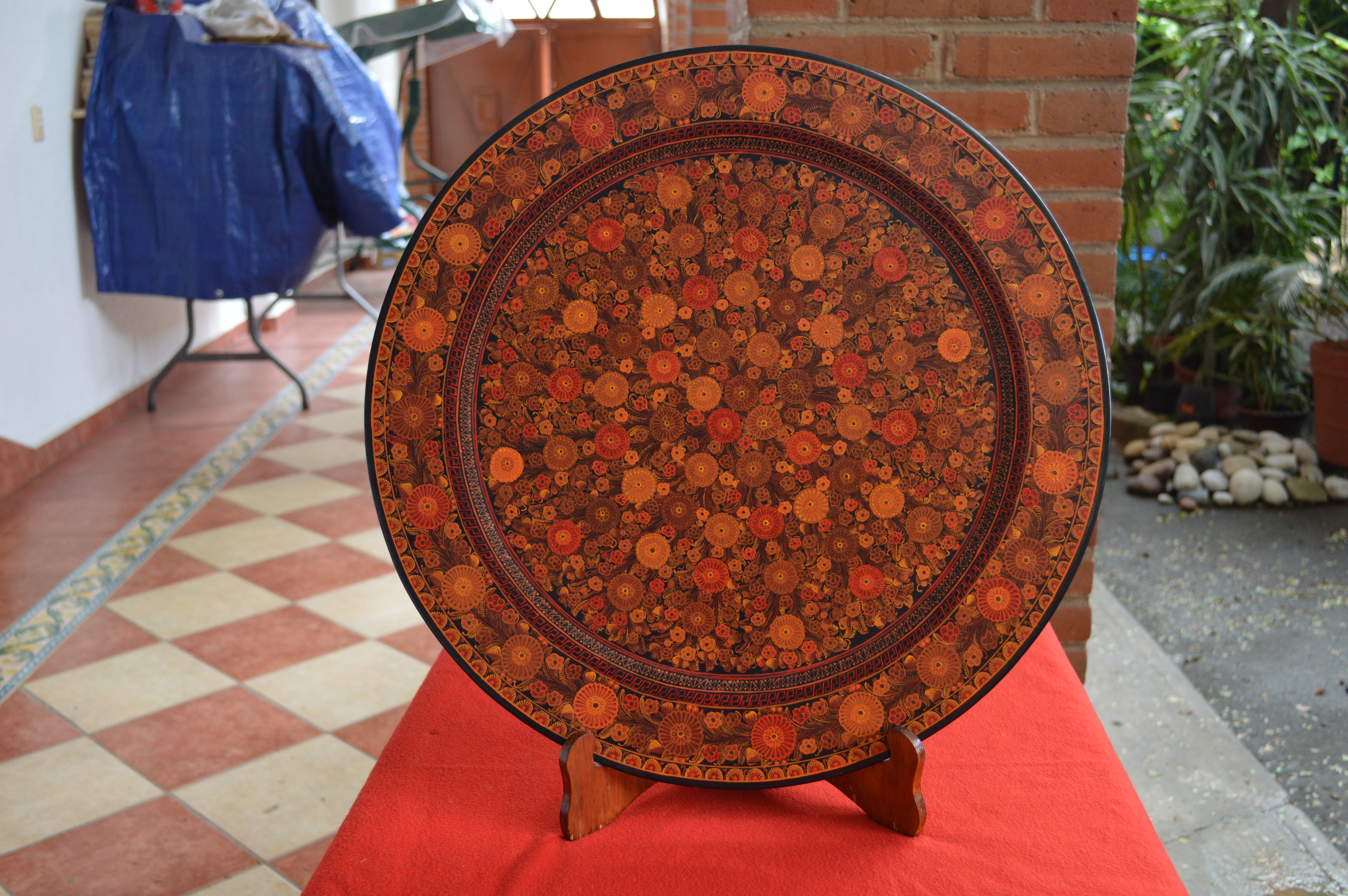
to a plat

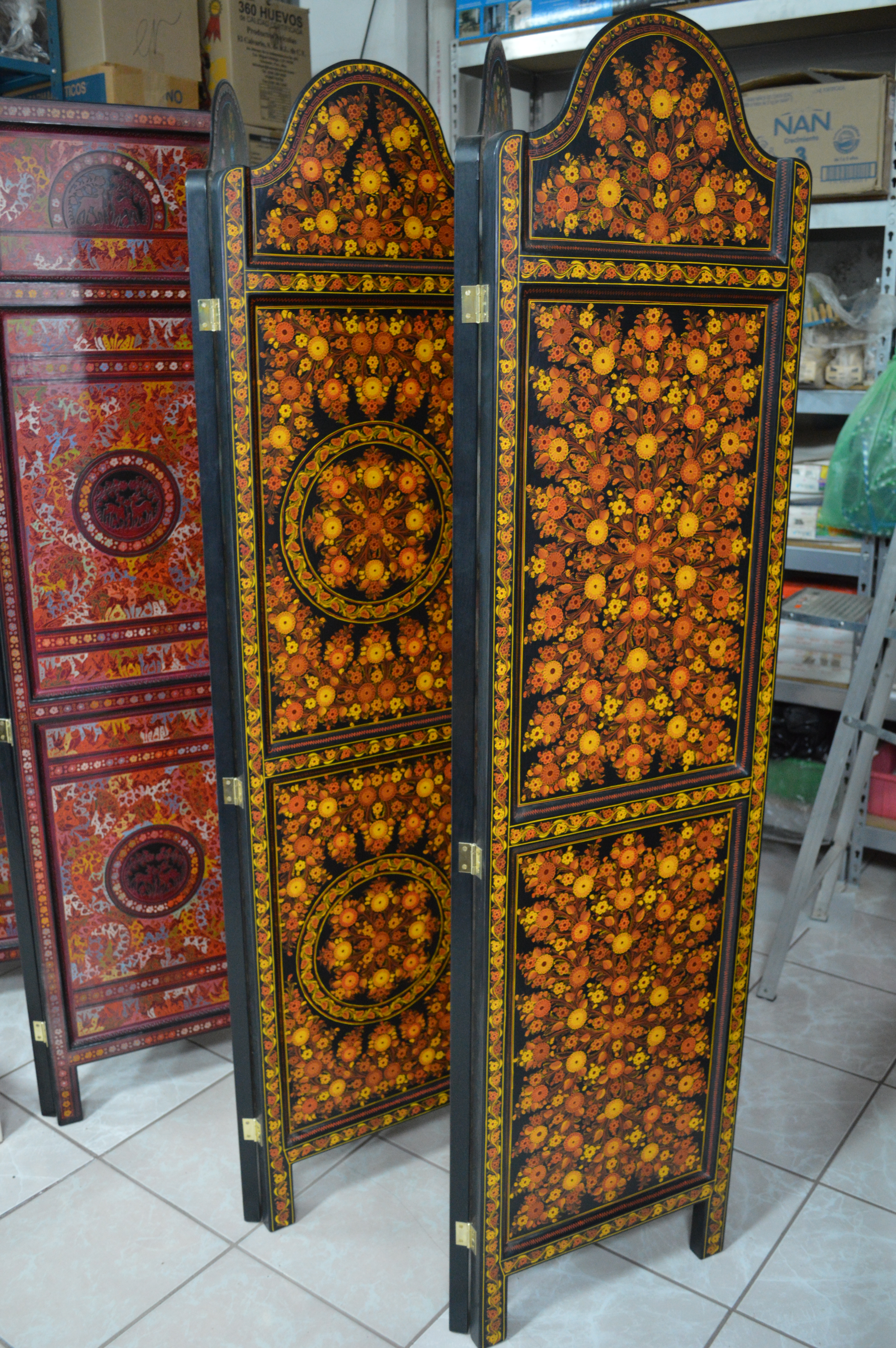
to a folding screen

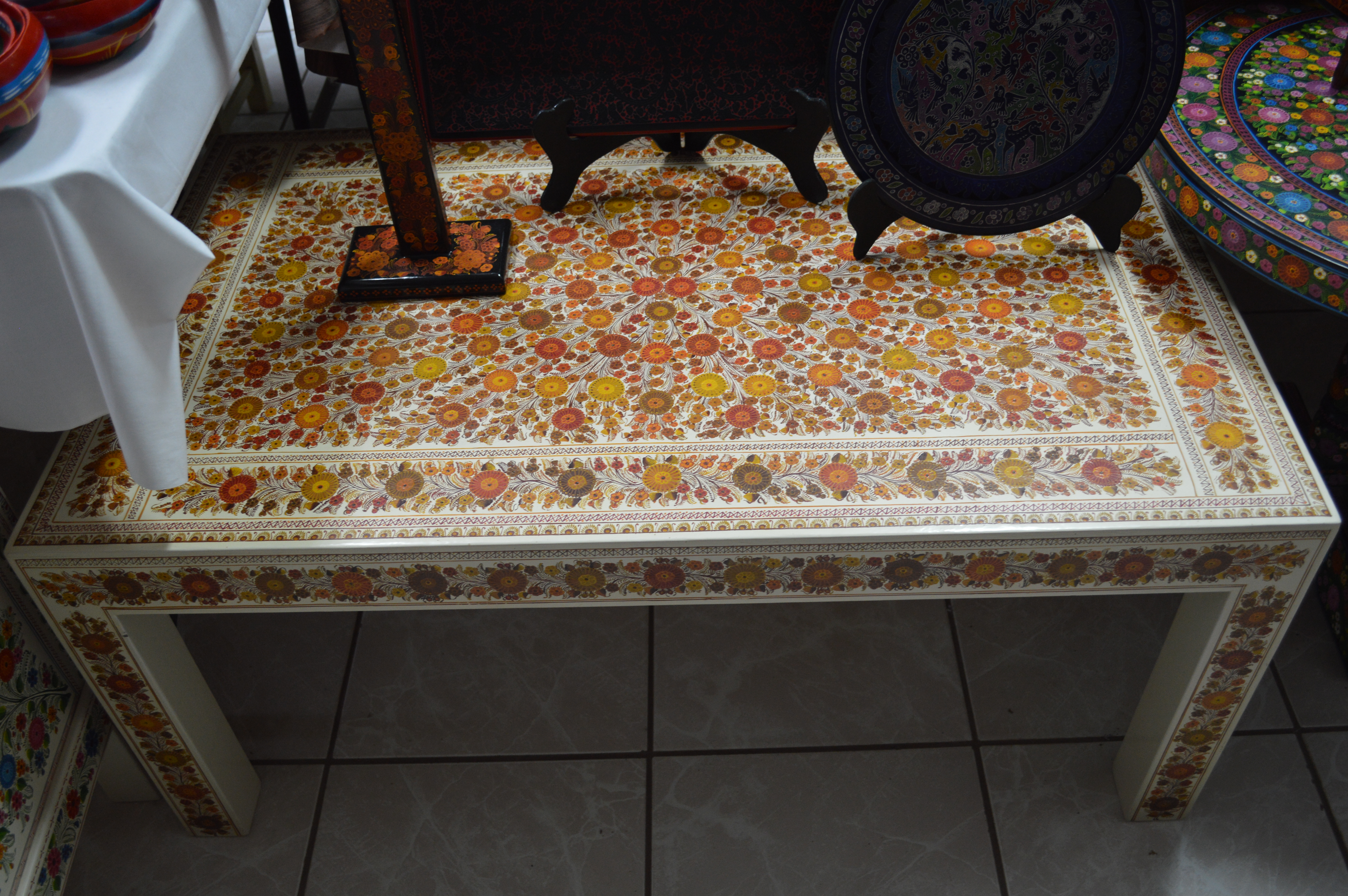
dorado applied to a table

The olinalá (Spanish pronunciation: [olina'la]) is a lacquering technique native to Olinalá, Guerrero, Mexico. To make objects with olinalá, the aromatic wood extracted from the linaloe tree (Bursera linanoe) is highly appreciated. It grows naturally in the region. The art of olinalá is closely associated with the indigenous communities of the area, mainly speaking Nahuatl and Tlapanec.

Although the most popular product is olinalá boxes and trunks, this artisan technique can also be applied to trays, fruit bowls, reliquaries, jewelry boxes, folding screens, headboards for the bed, seats, frames for mirrors and paintings, lecterns, breadboxes or tecomates (calabash bowls).

It is one of the 18 Mexican Designations of Origin, since 1994.

In 1993, the lacquering handicraftsmen from Olinalá received the National Prize for Arts in the Popular Arts and Traditions category.

== Process ==
=== Carpentry process ===
==== Obtaining linaloe wood ====
The linaloe or olinaloe (from the Latin, lignum aloe "oily wood"), called xochicopal in Nahuatl ("fine copal"), is a species of tree that grows in the low deciduous forest of Guerrero, Morelos, Oaxaca and Puebla, from whose fruit the aromatic linaloe oil is extracted. Certain voices have made public their concern about the overexploitation and decline of the linaloe population, in part related to the artisan production of Olinalá according to INIFAP.

The linaloe wood is highly valued for the manufacture of olinalá for its characteristic fragrance. Other woods such as red cedar or ayacahuite are also worked. To enhance this odor, the tree must be subjected, while still alive, to a process of cala ("incision"), which consists of making several longitudinal cuts in the trunk with a machete. This causes the tree to send the sap to the wound. This procedure is carried out during the rainy season, in the months of August and September. The sap and water react, and generate a "veined" or "marbled" texture of dark stains on the wood, which is precisely the much desired fragrant essential oil.

There are also producers who do not apply the cala process, which lowers the final price but does not give the furniture as much fragrance.

==== Working with linaloe wood ====
Depending on the furniture, the work that must be applied can vary, although in general, the wooden boards go through several treatments, first by brushing to smooth it, then the trunk or furniture is assembled and the insecticide is applied. After a few days of rest, holes are plastered (resanar) and sanded (lijar), in order to obtain a piece that is as smooth as possible. The boards are not very large due to the natural size of the tree, so the resulting furniture will not be either.

=== Lacquered process ===
For the lacado (lacquered or varnishing), the dolomite stone, called tóctetl, is the most important component (90%). It is an abundant rock in the region, that is extracted and dehydrated in fire, and then ground in a metate until it becomes a powder and is mixed with oak charcoal (nanche), which gives it the black color. Pigments are obtained from different sources, all natural, such as flower petals or mealybugs. The second layer is tecoxtle, an iron oxide that is mixed with chia oil (chamate) and serves as a binding agent. The third layer is texicaltetl or tezicaltetl, which is calcium carbonate. This is mixed with the desired earth or tone and the resulting product is called tlapezole. Chia oil and tezicaltetl add shine to the varnish. All the layers must be uniform, using, for example, quartz polishers, and once the lacquer is finished, it is let to rest for 10 to 15 days. After that, it goes to the rayado ('scratching') process. This is how Alzate y Ramírez defined them in his 19th century publication:

The soils for the composition of the painting are:

1. Tezicaltetl, granite stone embedded in a stone or quarry. Tezicaltetl means to stone.
2. Toctetl, buried stone.
3. Tecostli, yellow stone.
4. Tlalxococ, sour or bitter stone. Tlalxococ means transparent stone and therefore similar to copal.
5. Tejotlali, blue stone. With manual force, they are reduced to extremely fine powder in some grinding stones that are called in the region tlalmetates: stone or mill for grinding stones. To paint the jicaras of any color, they are first scraped and cleaned, and after drying they are smeared well with chia oil (...)

— José Antonio de Alzate y Ramírez, Gacetas de literatura de Mexico (1831) (translated and adapted)

=== Ornamentation process ===
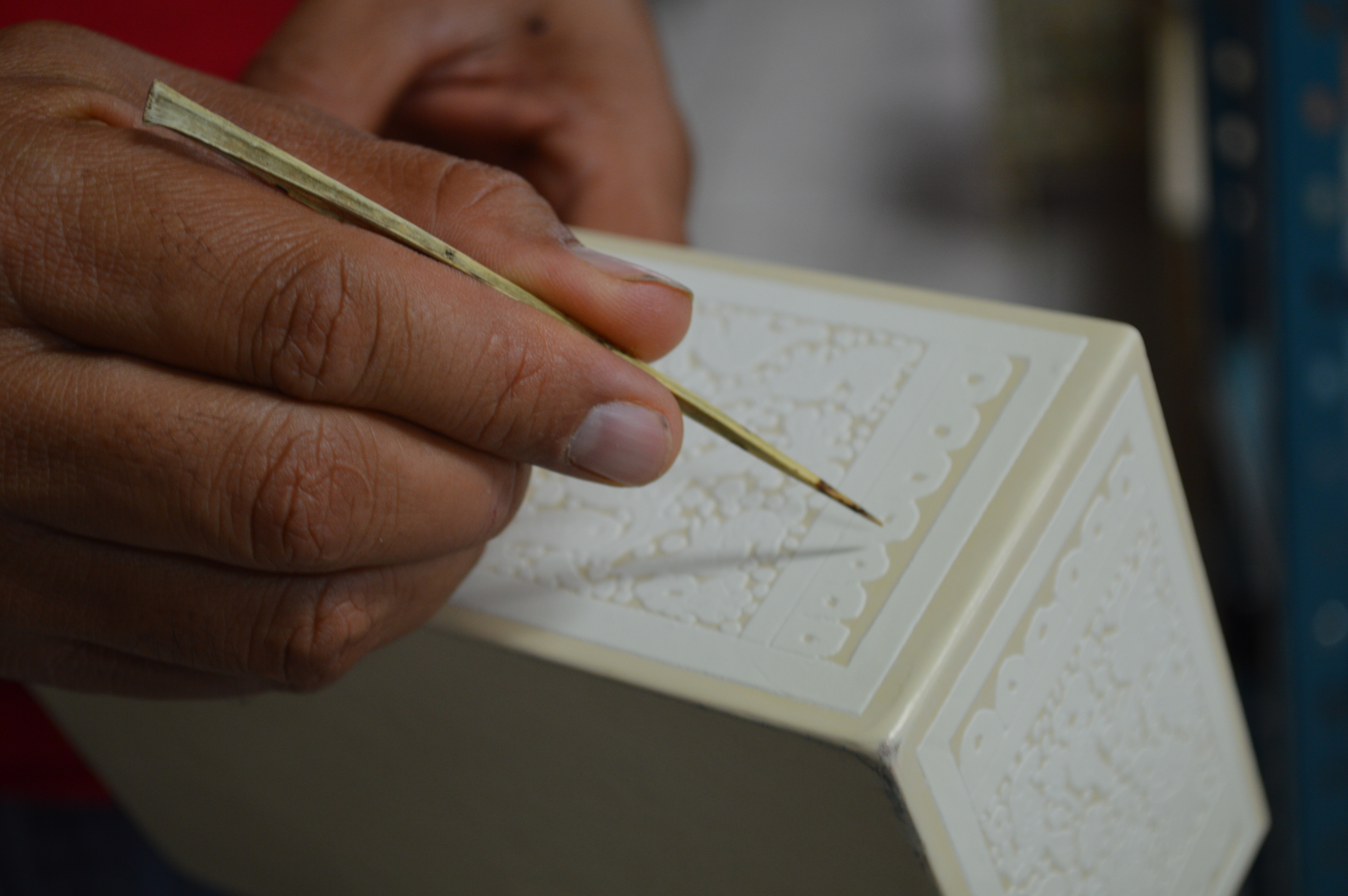
Rayado white on white with guajolote feather

==== Sgraffiting ====
Rayado ('scratching'), desdibujo ('inverse drawing'), vaciado ('hollowing') or recortado ('trimming') are local ways of calling sgraffito, which consists of drawing by making incisions in the lacquer with a guajolote feather at the tip of which is inserted a maguey or huizache thorn. Each artist has his or her style, although the most recurrent motifs are flora and fauna.

==== Precious metals application ====
Olinalá crafts often include the inlaying of precious metals, such as gold or silver, which is done by adding a thin layer of the metal over the lacquer and sgraffito, and requires the necessary tools for jewelry and metal handling, like a pomazón (cushion to work gold), tweezers, etc.

==== Painting and goldening ====
The last part is the pintado ('painting') process. Very fine-tipped brushes are used, made of turkey feather at the tip of which a cat's hair is inserted. Thanks to this, very elaborate motifs can be painted, which cover the entire surface of the box or furniture. Natural powder pigments mixed with sisa (oil based preparation for gluing gold) are used, that is, oil paint. In this case, each painter also has his own style, although flowers are usually the most frequent motif. Abstract, geometric and animal shapes are also very common. The drawings are simple in a naïve style and very colorful, which makes a beautiful contrast to the glossy black of the case.

=== Recommendations for wood conservation ===
Linaloe wood is a sweet wood for a wide variety of larvae and moths, so an insecticide must be applied. Also, it is common for the odor to diminish over time until it is eventually lost. To extend the life of the perfume, it is advisable to keep the box closed, away from direct sunlight and apply linaloe oil from time to time, extracted from the fruit of the same tree.

== Conservation and promotion of the craftwork ==
For the conservation and promotion of this craft, in 2013 the Olinalá Work Training Unit (UCAT Olinalá) was founded, associated with the Guerrero State Work Training Institute (ICATEGRO). Carpentry lessons are taught in this center, as well as traditional varnish and rayado and dorado techniques. The associate Taxco UCAT, instead of lacquered, it is specialized in precious metals (Taxco is known for its mining and metal tradition; in fact, the hinges used in Olinalá boxes come from here).

On September 5, 1994, the Official Journal of the Federation announced the protection of Olinalá's handicrafts as a Denomination of Origin (DO). This denomination represents the commitment of the Government of Mexico in the rescue, preservation and promotion of this pre-Hispanic art. It also involves the creation of a Regulatory Council (CR Olinalá) and a standardization of the quality of the pieces, which is key to avoid, on the one hand, swindles and imitations, and on the other, the degradation or cheapening of the original process (for example, looking for other cheaper materials, skipping key steps, or technifying the process). This standardization was developed jointly by the CR and the UNAM.

== See also ==
- Chiapan amber
- Talavera pottery
