= Olinalá (municipality) =

Municipality in the Mexican state of Guerrero

Coordinates: 17°50′00″N 98°51′00″W

- Municipality
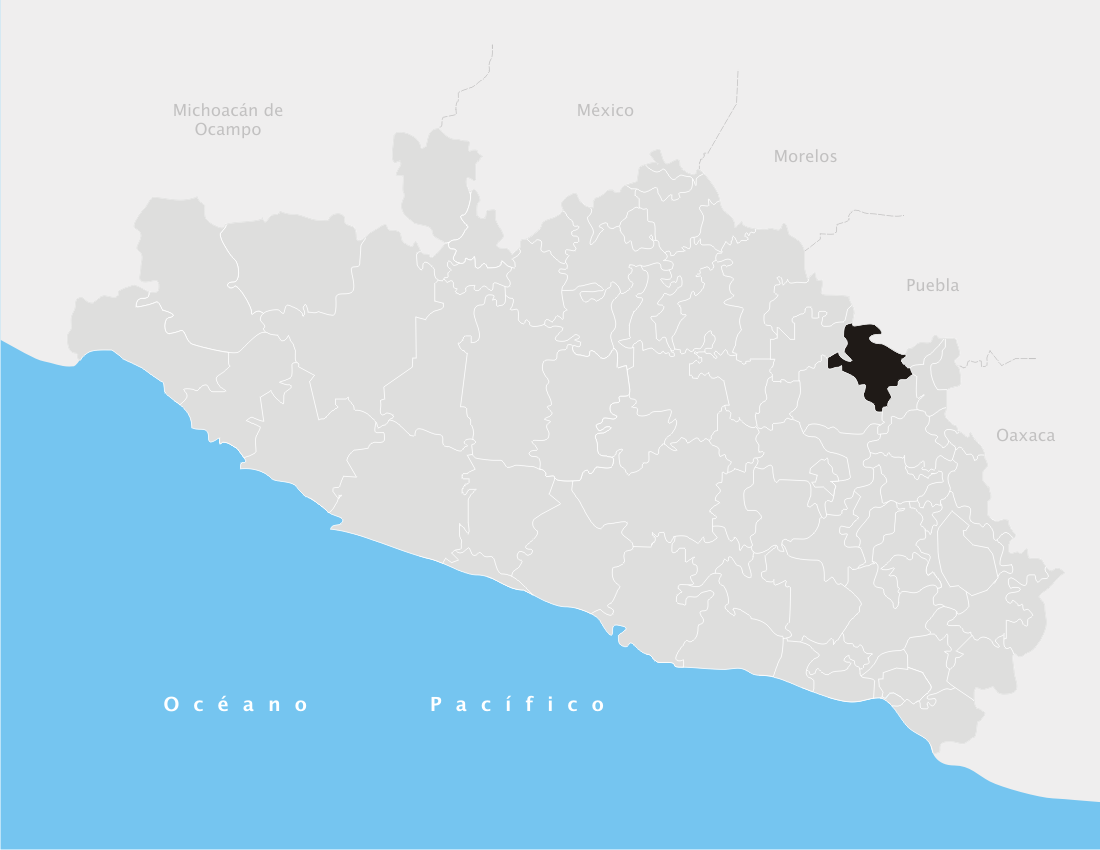
- Municipality of Olinalá in Guerrero
- Country: Mexico
- State: Guerrero
- Municipal seat: Olinalá

Area
  - Total: 1,028.1 km^{2} (397.0 sq mi)

Population (2005)
  - Total: 22,645

Olinalá is a municipality in the Mexican state of Guerrero. The municipal seat lies at Olinalá. The municipality covers an area of 1,028.1 km^{2}.

As of 2005, the municipality had a total population of 22,645.
