= Raicilla =

Alcoholic beverage from Jalisco, Mexico

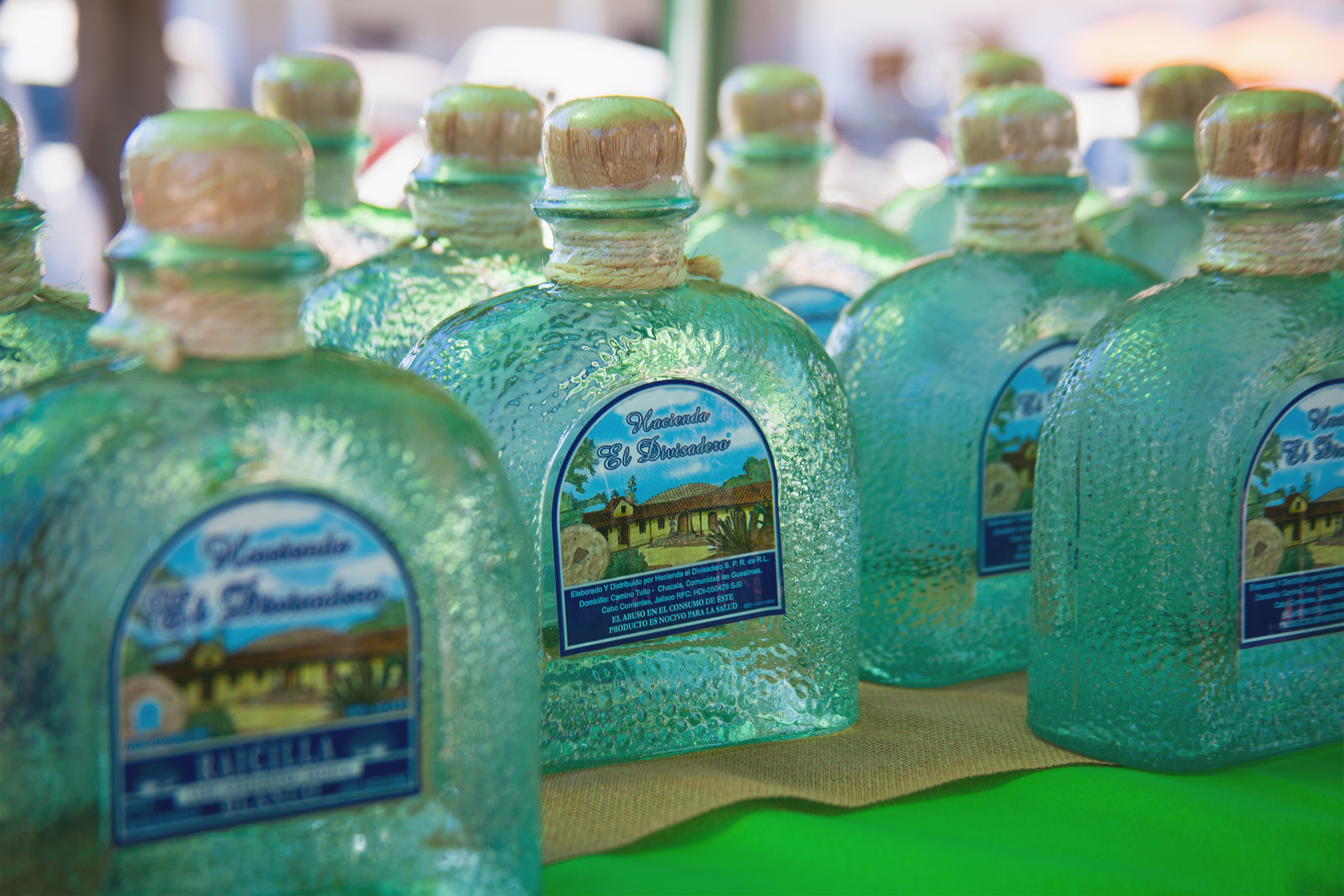

Raicilla ([raj.ˈsi.ʝa]], 'little root') is a distilled spirit originating in the south western part of the Mexican state of Jalisco. Like tequila and mezcal, it is a product of the agave plant.

Raicilla is a traditional beverage with about 300 years of history and a protected Denomination of Origin. Its aroma and flavor are derived from the species of agave and characterized by the soil, topography, climate, water, producer (maestro raicillero), yeasts, and other factors. Raicilla is colorless when it is matured in glass or yellowish when it is matured in wood.

== Process ==
Raicilla is distilled in rudimentary stills from a fermented mash made from the central stem (piña) of the agave plant. The mash is slow-cooked, and the steam condensed on a copper cone, cooled, traditionally, by spring water. To make a liter of Raicilla takes 10 kg of agave. Many different species of agaves are used to produce Raicilla, including Agave angustifolia (chico aguiar or "yellow"), Agave maximiliana, Agave inaequidens and Agave rhodacantha. It is usually more than 100 proof before water is added to control proof. Raicilla can be classified into different types based on its aging process and regional varieties. These include Young or Joven Raicilla, which is clear and the immediate result after distillation; Aged or Matured in Glass; Reposado, aged in wooden containers; Añejo, aged in wood barrels for over twelve months; and Abocado, infused with ingredients like herbs, fruits, and flowers. Additionally, there's double-distilled Raicilla, which is exclusive to artisanal or traditional processes. The types of Raicilla by region are Raicilla de la Costa and Raicilla de la Sierra, each with distinct flavor profiles owing to the agave varieties and terroir.

== Protected origin ==
The denominación de origen applies to 17 municipalities: Atengo, Chiquilistlán, Juchitlán, Tecolotlán, Tenamaxtlán, Puerto Vallarta, Cabo Corrientes, Tomatlán, Atenguillo, Ayutla, Cuautla, Guachinango, Mascota, Mixtlán, San Sebastián del Oeste and Talpa de Allende in Jalisco and Bahía de Banderas in Nayarit.
