= Tequila =

Distilled alcoholic beverage from Mexico

- Type: Distilled beverage
- Origin: Mexico, Jalisco
- Introduced: 16th century
- Alcohol by volume: 35–55%
- Proof (US): 70–110
- Colour: Clear, brown or golden
- Flavour: Sweet, fruity, earthy
- Ingredients: Blue agave
- Related products: Mezcal, bacanora, raicilla, pulque

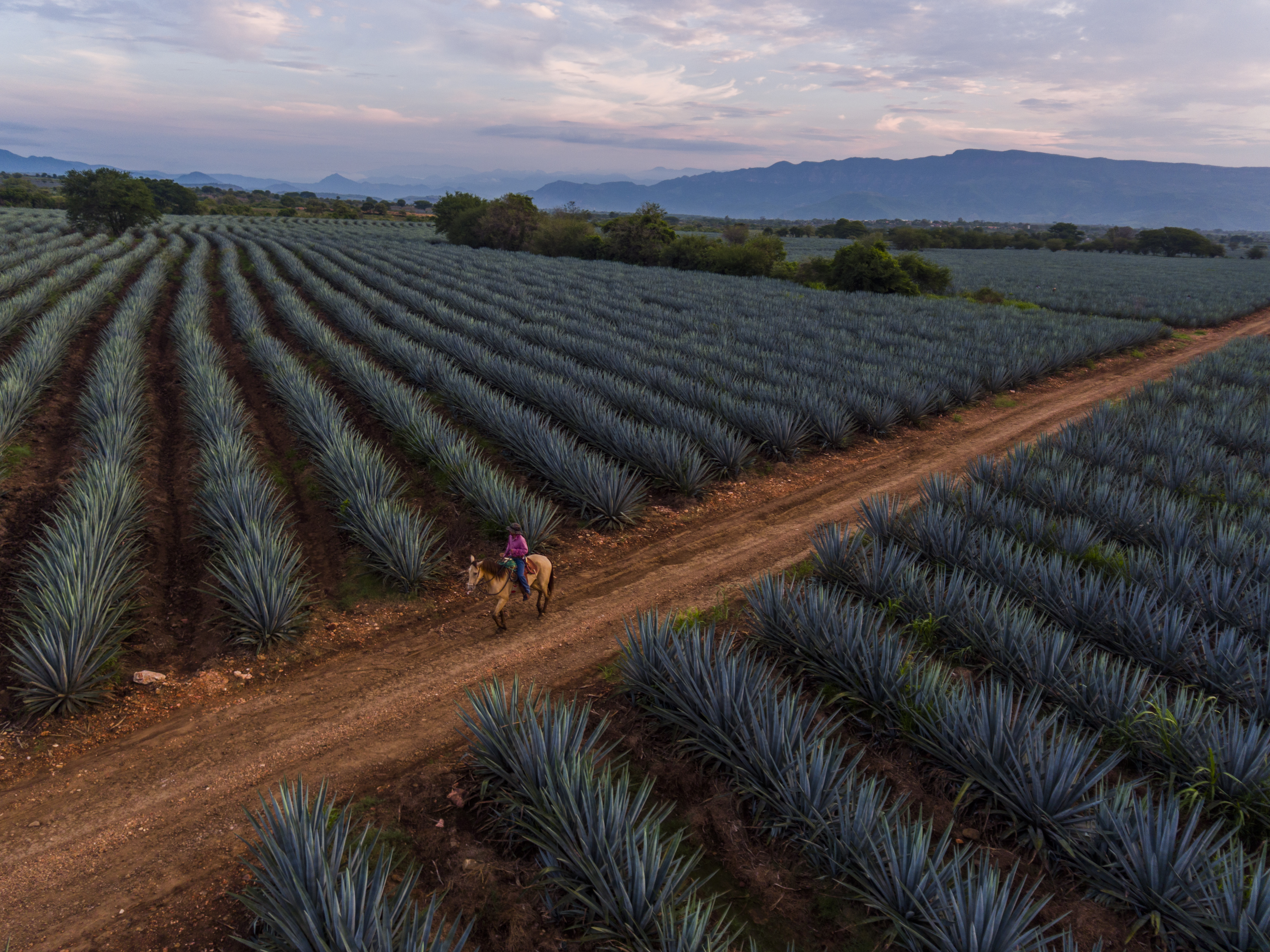
Blue agave fields near Tequila

Tequila (/təˈkiːlə/; Spanish: [teˈkila]) is a distilled beverage made from the blue agave plant, primarily in the area surrounding the town of Tequila 65 km (40 mi) northwest of Guadalajara, and in the Jaliscan Highlands (Los Altos de Jalisco) of the central western Mexican state of Jalisco.

The red volcanic soils in the region of Tequila are well suited for growing the blue agave, and more than 300 million plants are harvested there each year. Agave grows differently depending on the region. Blue agaves grown in the highland Los Altos region are larger and sweeter in aroma and taste. Agaves harvested in the valley region have a more herbaceous fragrance and flavor. Due to its historical and cultural importance, the region near Tequila was declared a UNESCO World Heritage Site in 2006, the Agave Landscape and Ancient Industrial Facilities of Tequila.

Tequila differs from mezcal—other distilled spirits from the agave plant—because it is made only from blue agave. By Mexican law, no beverage may be sold as tequila unless it contains between 35% and 55% alcohol content (70 and 110 U.S. proof) and is produced in the state of Jalisco and limited municipalities in the states of Guanajuato, Michoacán, Nayarit, and Tamaulipas.

International agreements also prevent the sale of "tequila" produced outside Mexico. The drink is recognized as a Mexican designation of origin product in more than 40 countries. It was protected through NAFTA in Canada and the United States until July 2020 and through bilateral agreements with individual countries such as Japan and Israel, and it has been a protected designation of origin product in the European Union since 1997.

Tequila is commonly served neat in Mexico and as a shot with salt and lime around the world.

== History ==
=== Early history ===
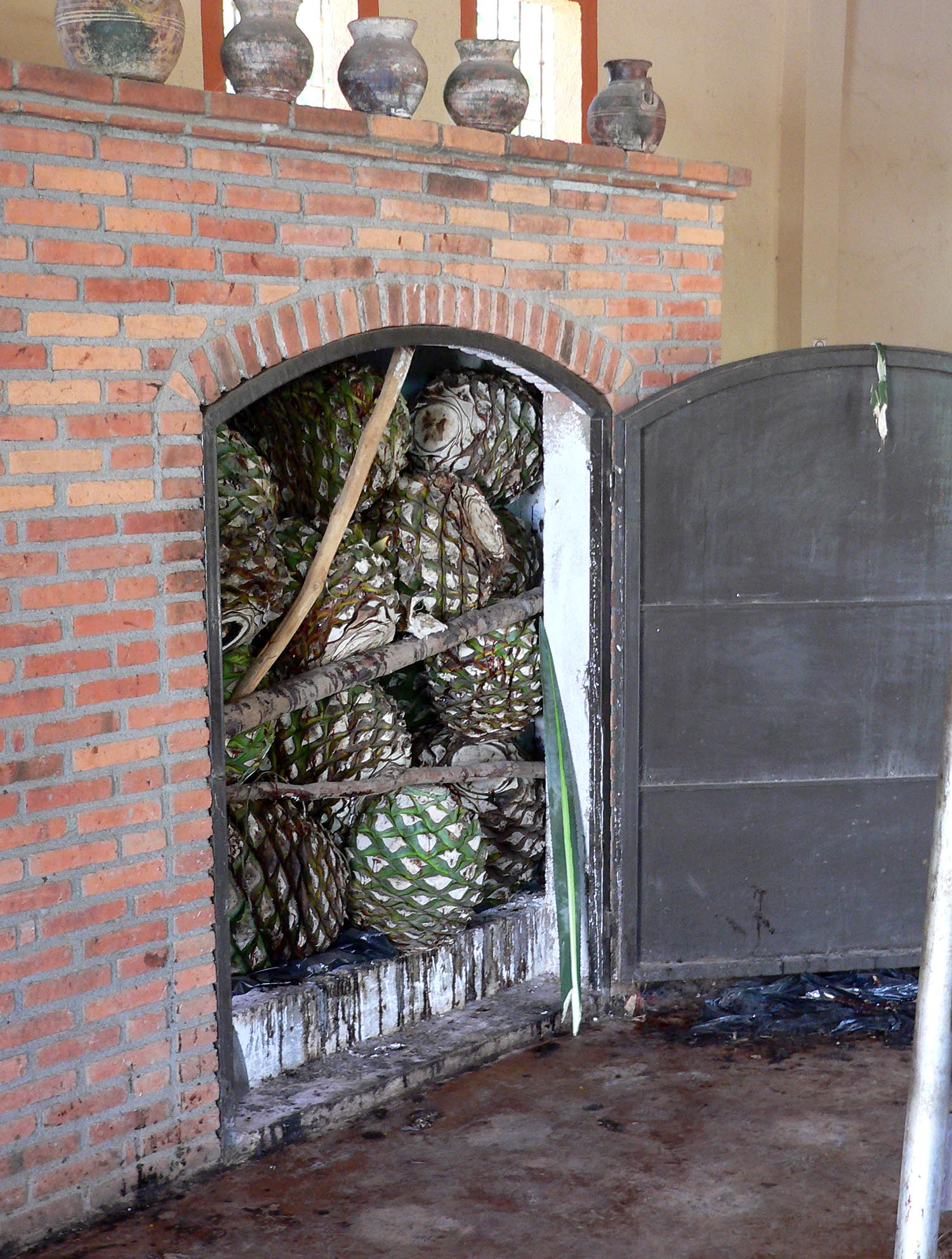
A distillery oven loaded with agave piñas or "pineapples", the first step in the production of tequila post harvest

Before the production of tequila or mezcal, pulque had been brewed from agave sap for thousands of years. Pulque is fermented, not distilled. The distillation technology to produce mezcal from agave heart juice was first introduced by Filipino sailors and migrants into the coastal regions of what was then Nueva Galicia (present-day Aguascalientes, Colima, Guanajuato, Jalisco, Nayarit, and Zacatecas). Mezcal distillation spread into the highland valleys of Amatitán, Tequila, Magdalena, and El Arenal in the mid-1700s. The distinctive mezcal produced in these regions became known as "tequila".

Spain's King Carlos IV granted the Cuervo family the first license to commercially make tequila. Don Cenobio Sauza, founder of Sauza Tequila and Municipal President of the Village of Tequila from 1884 to 1885, was the first to export tequila to the United States.

The first tequila distillery in the United States was opened in 1936 in Nogales, Arizona by Harry J. Karns, former Arizona state senator and Nogales Mayor.

The Mexican government declared the term "tequila" to be its intellectual property in 1974.

=== Recent history ===
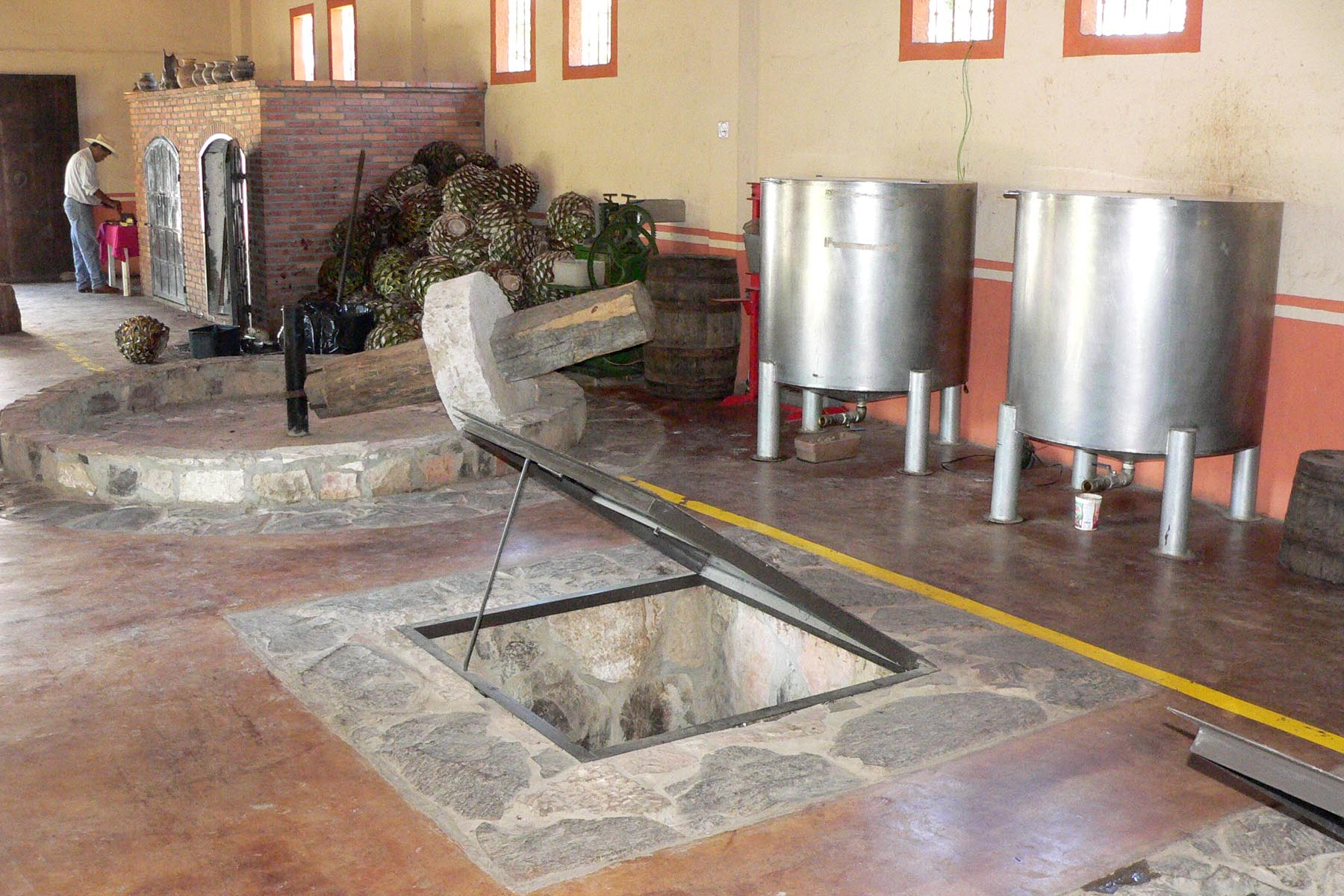
A tahona, large stone wheel, at the Hacienda Doña Engracia that was used to crush the piña. Large, modern distilleries commonly complete this process mechanically.

Although some tequilas have remained as family-owned brands, most well-known tequila brands are owned by large multinational corporations. Over 100 distilleries make over 900 brands of tequila in Mexico and over 2,000 brand names have been registered (2009 statistics). Due to this, each bottle of tequila contains a serial number (NOM) denoting in which distillery the tequila was produced. In many cases, multiple different brands come from the same manufacturer.

In 2003, Mexico issued a proposal that would require all Mexican-made tequila be bottled in Mexico before being exported to other countries. The Mexican government said that bottling tequila in Mexico would guarantee its quality. Liquor companies in the United States said Mexico just wanted to create bottling jobs in their own country, and also claimed this rule would violate international trade agreements and was in discord with usual exporting practices worldwide. The proposal might have resulted in the loss of jobs at plants in California, Arkansas, Missouri, and Kentucky, because Mexican tequila exported in bulk to the United States is bottled in those plants. On January 17, 2006, the United States and Mexico signed an agreement allowing the continued bulk import of tequila into the United States. The agreement also created a "tequila bottlers registry" to identify approved bottlers of tequila and created an agency to monitor the registry.

The Tequila Regulatory Council (Consejo Regulador del Tequila – CRT) originally did not permit flavored tequila to carry the tequila name. In 2004, the Council decided to allow flavored tequila to be called tequila, with the exception of 100% agave tequila, which still cannot be flavored.

A new Norma Oficial Mexicana (NOM) for tequila (NOM-006-SCFI-2005) was issued in 2006 and, among other changes, introduced a class of tequila called extra añejo or "ultra-aged", which must be aged a minimum of three years.

A one-liter bottle of limited-edition premium tequila was sold for $225,000 in July 2006 in Tequila, Jalisco, by the company Tequila Ley .925. The bottle that contained the tequila was a two-kilo display of platinum and gold. The manufacturer received a certificate from The Guinness World Records for the most expensive bottle of tequila spirit ever sold.

In June 2013, a Chinese ban on the importation of premium (100% blue agave) tequila into China was lifted, following a state visit to Mexico by Chinese Communist Party general secretary Xi Jinping. The entry of premium tequila into the country was expected to increase tequila exports by 20 percent within the decade above the 170 million liters in 2013. Ramon Gonzalez, director of the Consejo Regulador del Tequila, estimates that each of the top 16 producers of tequila had invested up to $3 million to enter the Chinese market. On 30 August 2013, the first 70,380 bottles of premium tequila from ten brands arrived in Shanghai. The arrival happened during an event held at the House of Roosevelt, a well-known club located on The Bund – an area with a long tradition of importing alcoholic beverages in China.

The latest version of the tequila standard (NOM-006-SCFI-2012) updated the standard to specify that the silver class of tequila cannot contain additives, to allow the aging time for the ultra-aged class to be displayed on the label, and to prohibit the selling of bulk tequila through vending machines, and required registering the agave during the calendar year of its plantation and required annual updates.

In 2018, the Mexican government approved a proposal to celebrate the third Saturday of March as National Tequila Day.

== Economy ==
In 2024, the government reported that international sales of tequila from Tequila municipality reached approximately US $572 million. The majority of sales are to the United States, the top destination country in 2024.

== Production ==
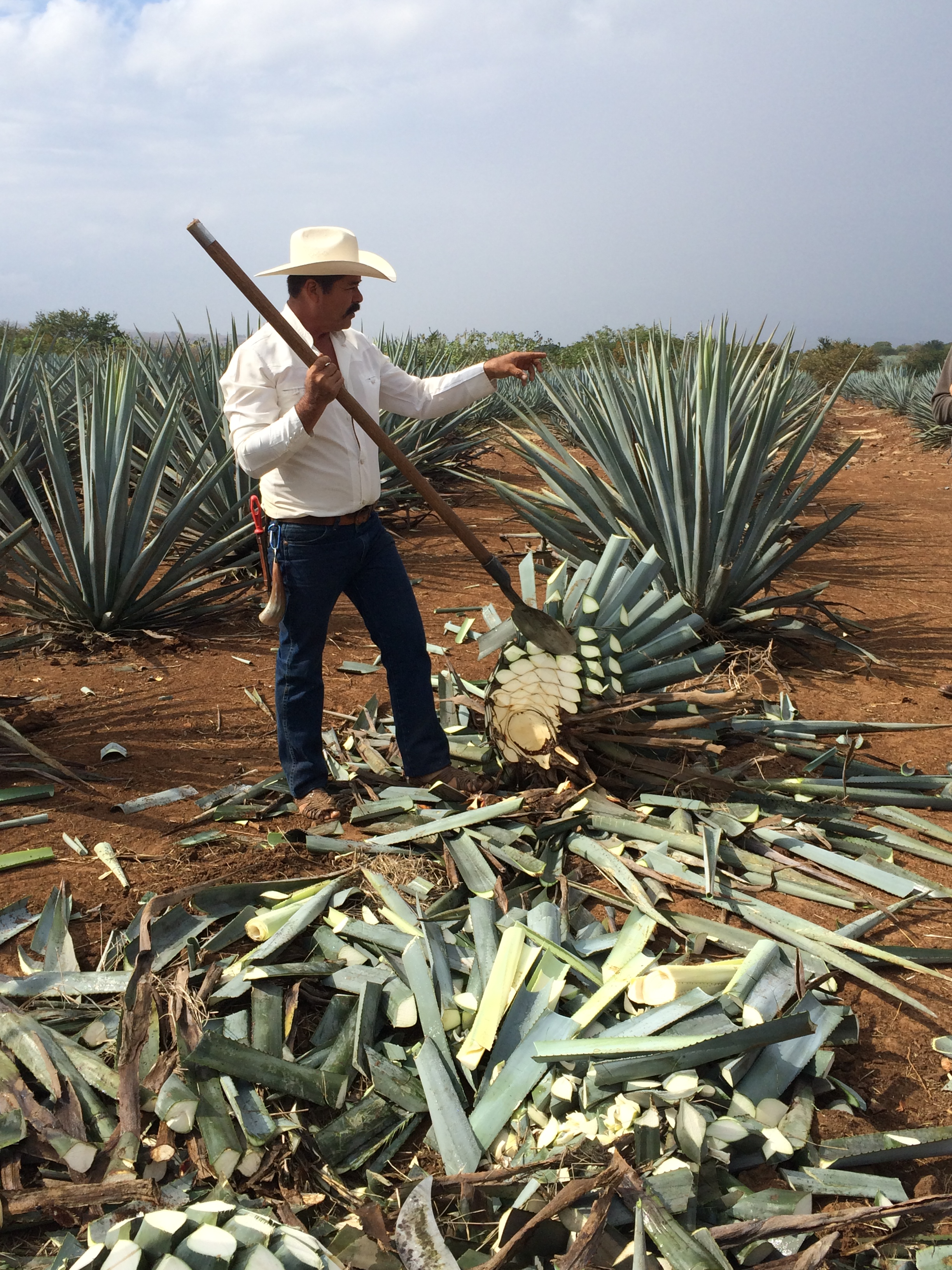
A jimador or a worker who harvests the agaves and cuts off the sharp leaves

Tequila is made from the blue agave plant, primarily in the area surrounding the town of Tequila 65 km (40 mi) northwest of Guadalajara, and in the Jaliscan Highlands (Los Altos de Jalisco) of the central western Mexican state of Jalisco. Aside from its geographical distinction, tequila is differentiated from other varieties of mezcal in that all of the agave used in tequila is blue agave, and the methods of production are different.

The red volcanic soils in the region of Tequila are well suited for growing the blue agave, and more than 300 million plants are harvested there each year. Agave grows differently depending on the region. Blue agaves grown in the highland Los Altos region are larger and sweeter in aroma and taste. Agaves harvested in the valley region have a more herbaceous fragrance and flavor. Due to its historical and cultural importance, the region near Tequila was declared a UNESCO World Heritage Site in 2006, the Agave Landscape and Ancient Industrial Facilities of Tequila.

Planting, tending, and harvesting the agave plant remains a manual effort, largely unchanged by modern farm machinery and relying on centuries-old expertise. The people who harvest it, the jimadores [ximaˈðoɾes], passed down the knowledge of how the plants should be cultivated from generation to generation.

By regularly trimming any quiotes [ˈkjotes] (a stalk at the center of the plant that could grow several meters high if not cut back), the jimadores prevent the agave from flowering and dying early, allowing it to fully ripen. They also determine when each plant is ready to be harvested, and using a special knife called a coa (with a circular blade on a long pole), carefully cut away the leaves from the piña (the succulent core of the plant), which can average around 70 kg (150 lb) in the valley and 110 kg (240 lb) in the highlands. If harvested too late or too early, the piñas will not have the right amount of carbohydrates for fermentation.

After harvesting, the piñas [ˈpiɲas] are transported to ovens where they are slowly baked to break down their complex fructans into simple fructose. Then, the baked piñas are either shredded or mashed under a large stone wheel called a tahona [taˈona]. The pulp fiber, or bagazo [baˈɣaso], left behind is often reused as compost or animal feed, or can be used as fuel or processed into paper. Some producers like to add a small amount of bagazo back into their fermentation tanks for a stronger agave flavor in the final product.

The extracted agave juice is then poured into either large wooden or stainless steel vats for several days to ferment, resulting in a wort, or mosto [ˈmosto], with low alcohol content. This wort is then distilled once to produce what is called ordinario [oɾðiˈnaɾjo], and then a second time to produce clear "silver" tequila. A minimum of two distillations is required by law. A few producers such as Casa Noble (for their "Crystal" expression) and Corzo (for their añejo expression) have experimented with distilling the product a third time, but this has not caught on as a trend, and some have said it removes too much of the agave flavor from the tequila. At this point the tequila is either bottled as silver tequila or it is pumped into wooden barrels to age, where it develops a mellower flavor and amber color.

The differences in taste between tequila made from valley and highland agave plants can be noticeable. Plants grown in the highlands often yield sweeter and fruitier-tasting tequila, while valley agaves give the tequila an earthier flavor.

== Fermentation ==
Unlike other tequila production steps, fermentation is largely outside the control of human beings. Fermentation is the conversion of sugars and carbohydrates to alcohol through yeast under anaerobic conditions, meaning that oxygen is not present during the process. Fermentation is also carried out in a non-aseptic environment, which increases the bacterial activity of tequila. The participation of microorganisms from the environment (yeasts and bacteria) makes fermentation a spontaneous process that gives rise to many byproducts that contribute to the flavor and aroma of tequila.

During the fermentation process, inoculum is added to the batch to accelerate the rate of fermentation. When inoculum is added, fermentation can take approximately 20 hours to 3 days. If inoculum is not added, fermentation could take up to 7 days. The rate of fermentation is a key factor in the quality and flavor of tequila produced. Worts fermented slowly are best because the amount of organoleptic compounds produced is greater. The alcohol content at the end of fermentation is between 4% and 9%.

=== Organoleptic compounds ===
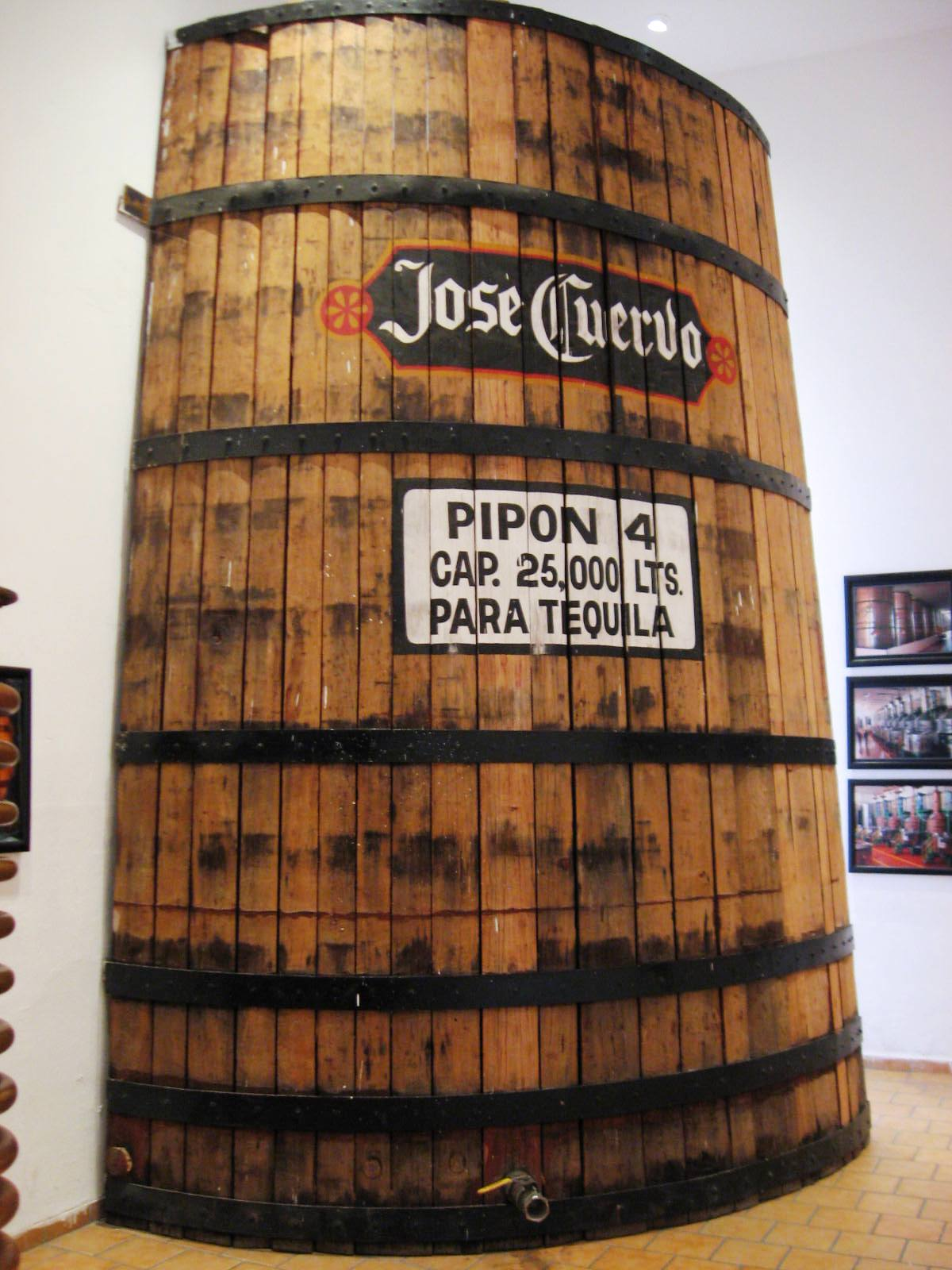
Tequila fermentation vessel, National Museum of Tequila

Organoleptic compounds enhance flavor and aroma. These include fusel oil, methanol, aldehydes, organic acids and esters. Production of isoamyl and isobutyl alcohols begins after the sugar level is lowered substantially and continues for several hours after the alcoholic fermentation ends. In contrast, ethanol production begins in the first hours of the fermentation and ends with logarithmic yeast growth. The alcohol content in tequila is affected by three factors: the amount of isoamyl alcohol and isobutanol in the yeast strain, the carbon:nitrogen ratio (the higher the ratio, the more alcohol produced), and the temperature of fermentation.

The higher the temperature, the greater concentration of isobutyl and isoamyl alcohols produced. Although if temperatures are too high, this can cause the yeast to become less effective. Similarly, if the temperature is too low, the process occurs too slowly. This can become a large issue in Central Mexico, where most tequila is processed and where the daytime temperature can reach 31–35 °C. For this reason, tequila producers often use large stainless steel tanks for fermentation.

=== Yeast ===
The specific yeasts and the environments in which they act determine the resultant organoleptic combinations. The role of yeast is, through many enzymatic processes, to turn sugars and carbohydrates into alcohol. There are two steps, first in aerobic conditions, yeast is doubled in colony size every four hours. This process goes on for 24–48 hours. Next, yeast turns acetaldehyde into ethyl alcohol, which is known as one of the organoleptic compounds produced in fermentation.

The two main categories of yeast used in tequila are commercial brewers yeast and yeast that comes from precultivated existing yeast that has been preserved. The use of either type of yeast can result in different end products of tequila. Traditional production uses so-called "open fermentation", relying on yeasts from the surrounding environment. A 2023 article analyzes the diversity of yeasts found in these uncontrolled conditions.

== Chemistry ==
=== Alcohol content ===
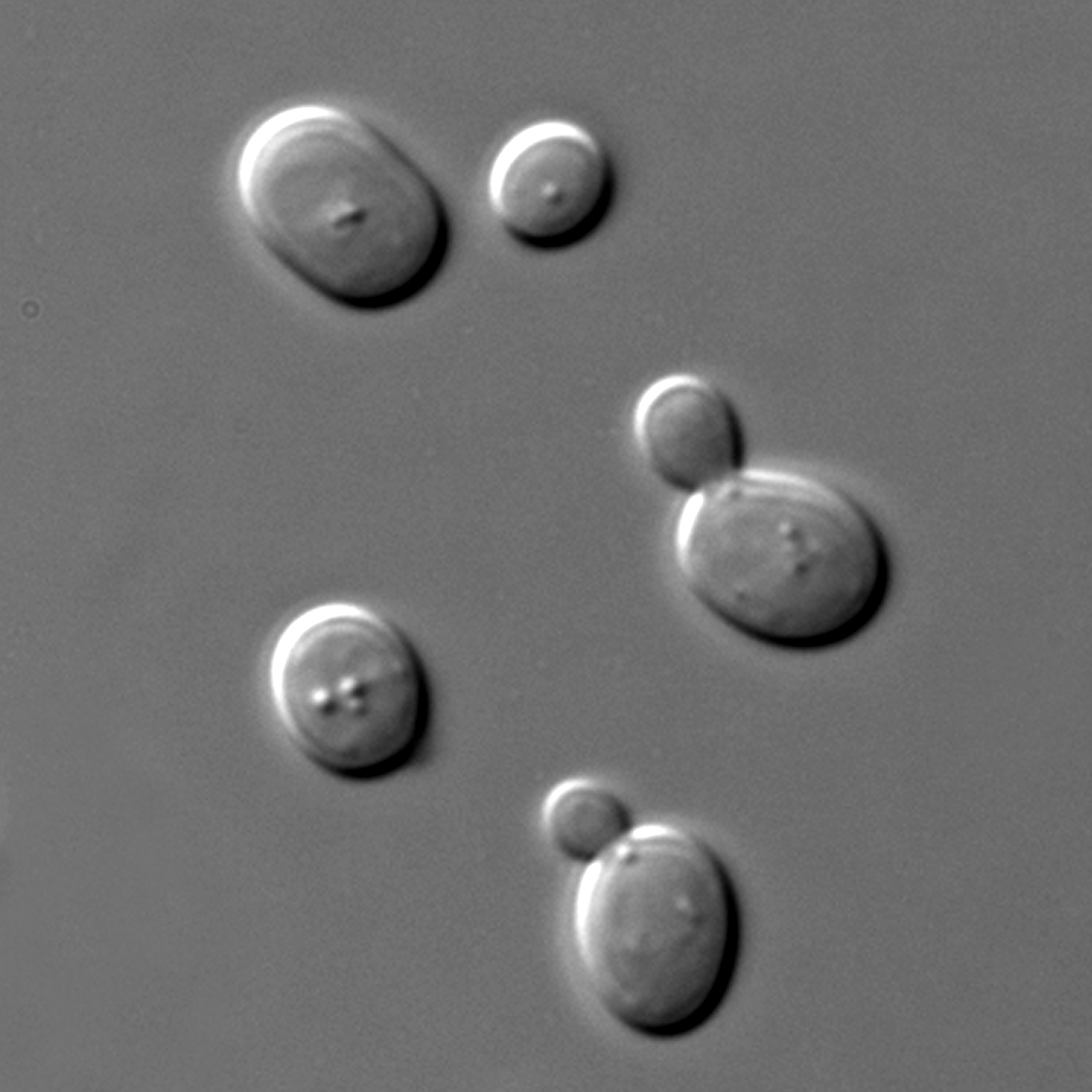
Saccharomyces cerevisiae, under a microscope

Tequila must have between 35% and 55% alcohol content (70 and 110 U.S. proof). Tequila is a distilled beverage that is made from the fermentation of the sugars in the blue agave plant once it has been cooked, the main sugar being fructose. Through the fermentation process, many factors influence the higher-order alcohols present in tequila, which include molecules such as isobutyl alcohol and isoamyl alcohol, along with the ethanol. Factors include the strain of yeast, the age of the agave plant itself, temperature, and the ratio of carbon to nitrogen.

The yeast strain used and the carbon-to-nitrogen ratio have the biggest influence on the production of higher-order alcohols; this is not surprising, as production of ethanol and higher-order alcohols is an intrinsic property of the metabolism of each strain. The type of yeast most commonly found in tequila is Saccharomyces cerevisiae, which can include many different strains. For example, CF1 agaves, a type of yeast, produces much more ethanol than a CF2 strain, as the two yeasts' metabolic mechanisms differ. Prevalence of certain strains of yeast may be influenced by agricultural practices. It was found that higher ratios of carbon to nitrogen resulted in greater production of higher-order alcohols such as isobutyl alcohol and isoamyl alcohol. The lower level of nitrogen in the fermentation process results in deamination reactions of amino acids, which in turn leads to the synthesis of higher alcohols. The Ehrlich pathway refers to this process in which alpha-keto acids are decarboxylated and transformed to aldehydes and to higher alcohols.

The temperature of the fermentation process also greatly affects the alcohol content of the resulting product. For example, a study conducted by Pinal et al. found that cultivating two strains at a temperature of 35 °C as compared to a temperature of 30 °C produced more isoamyl alcohol. The higher temperature appears to be favorable for the action of the yeast.

The age of the agave plant is also a factor: the older the plant, the greater the production of higher-order alcohols. It was shown in a study that the concentration of amyl alcohol increased by 30% as the plant aged. Conversely, a higher concentration of methanol is found when using younger plants. This change may be due to differences in agricultural practices with plants of different ages.

=== Color ===
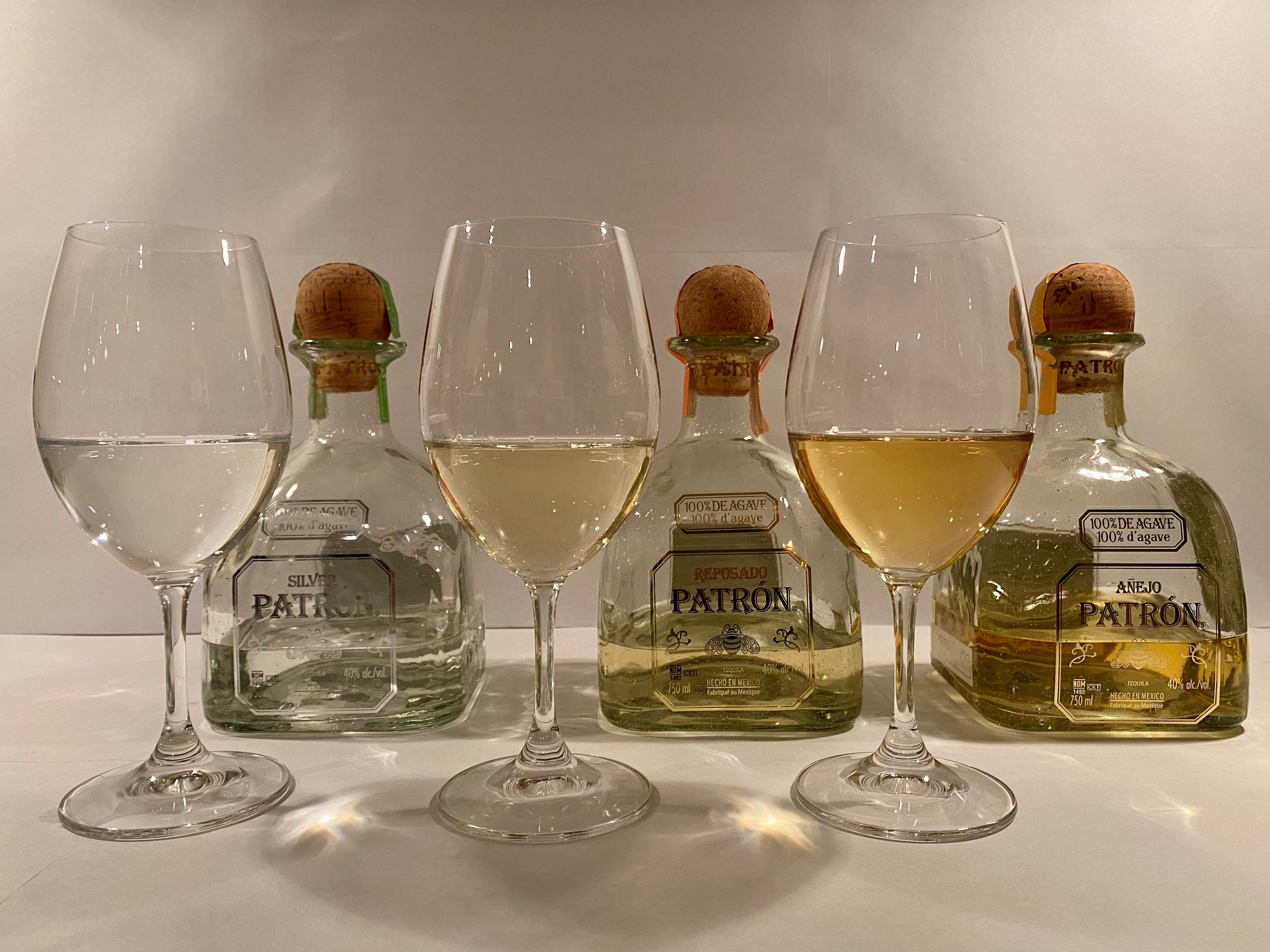
White (left), reposado (centre) and añejo (right) tequila, showing the difference in color

Tequila's color ranges from clear to a brownish amber, depending on the aging process and the type of wood used for storage. The white (blanco) version of tequila, also nicknamed "silver", is the product with no aging, or may be aged less than two months. It is the purest form, as little has been done to change it. What is known as gold, joven or oro tequila is usually white tequila with the addition of grain alcohols and caramel color; some higher-end gold tequilas may be a blend of white and reposado. Rested (reposado) tequila is aged for a relatively short time (two months or more), and aged (añejo) tequila for a longer time (a year or more). All aging of tequila is done in wooden containers. The aging process can last three years or more, and can create or enhance flavors and aromas. It generally imparts a golden color.

=== Flavor and aroma ===
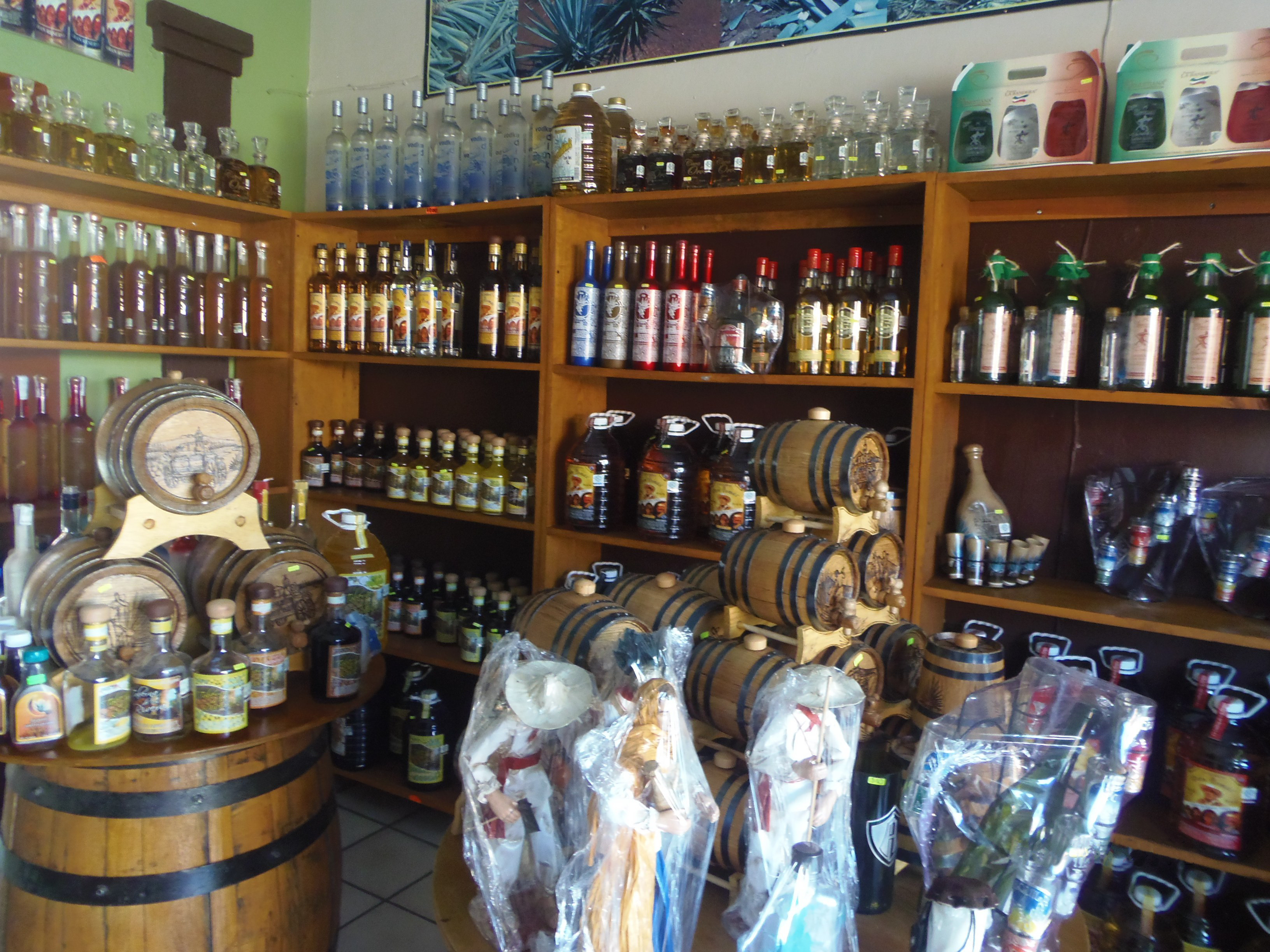
Tequila store in Jalisco

There are more than 300 known compounds in tequila, many of which are produced during the fermentation process, the raw material used, and to a lesser degree during the maturation. The volatile compounds responsible for the flavor and aroma profiles of the tequila are put into a category called organoleptic compounds and are known to increase in concentration with a slower fermentation process.

Higher-order alcohols have a strong aroma, and the quantity present in each tequila depends on the carbon:nitrogen ratio and temperature during the cooking and fermentation processes.

In general, the longer the controlled fermentation period, the higher yield of esters produced. For example, isovaleraldehyde seems to produce a sweet, cocoa, and chocolate-like flavor. 2 and 3-methylbutanal produce a malty flavor. The agave plant contains many phenolics such as vanillin and syringaldehydes, which present a strong and fruity or herbal aroma. It also contains eugenol, which can deliver a hint of spicy flavor to the tequila. Because the production of tequila involves heating, Maillard browning reactions occur, and furans are produced during the thermal degradation of sugar. The most prominent furanic compounds include 2-furaldehyde and 5-methylfuraldehyde, which can contribute to the smoky flavor of tequila. Guaiacol also seems to contribute to Tequila's smoky flavor. Beta-demascenone contributes to the woody, floral taste of tequila.

Volatile compounds that contribute to the overall taste and aroma of tequila can be quantitatively assessed and evaluated by gas chromatography. Discrimination tests such as duo-trio and triangle tests are also used to evaluate the quality of the tequila.

== Aging ==
=== Process ===
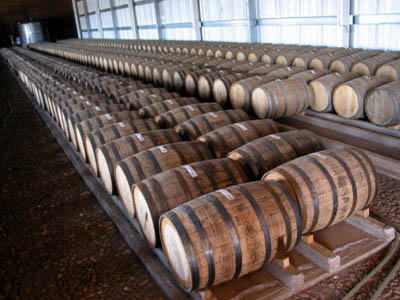
Barrel room for aged (añejo) tequila

If silver or white (Blanco) tequila is the desired final product, distillation is the final process it undergoes. Rested (Reposado) or aged (Añejo) tequila must be matured in 200-liter (or larger) white oak barrels for at least two months for the former and 12 months for the latter. The newest category of tequila classification, extra añejo, must be aged for at least three years in oak barrels. There are, however, more than 50 different companies producing tequila in the Mexican state of Jalisco, with different maturation times according to the variety of tequila and desired quality of the final product.

All companies producing tequila have their aging processes regulated and fiscalized by the Mexican government.

=== Chemistry ===
The maturation process causes four main chemical transformations to the tequila compounds: (1) decreasing of fusel oils by the char in barrels, which acts as an absorbing agent; (2) extraction of complex wood constituents by tequila, giving specific aroma and flavor to the final product; (3) reactions among the components of tequila, creating new chemical compounds; and (4) oxidation of the original contents of tequila and of those extracted from wood. The final results of these changes are increased concentrations of acids, esters and aldehydes, and a decrease in fusel oil concentration.

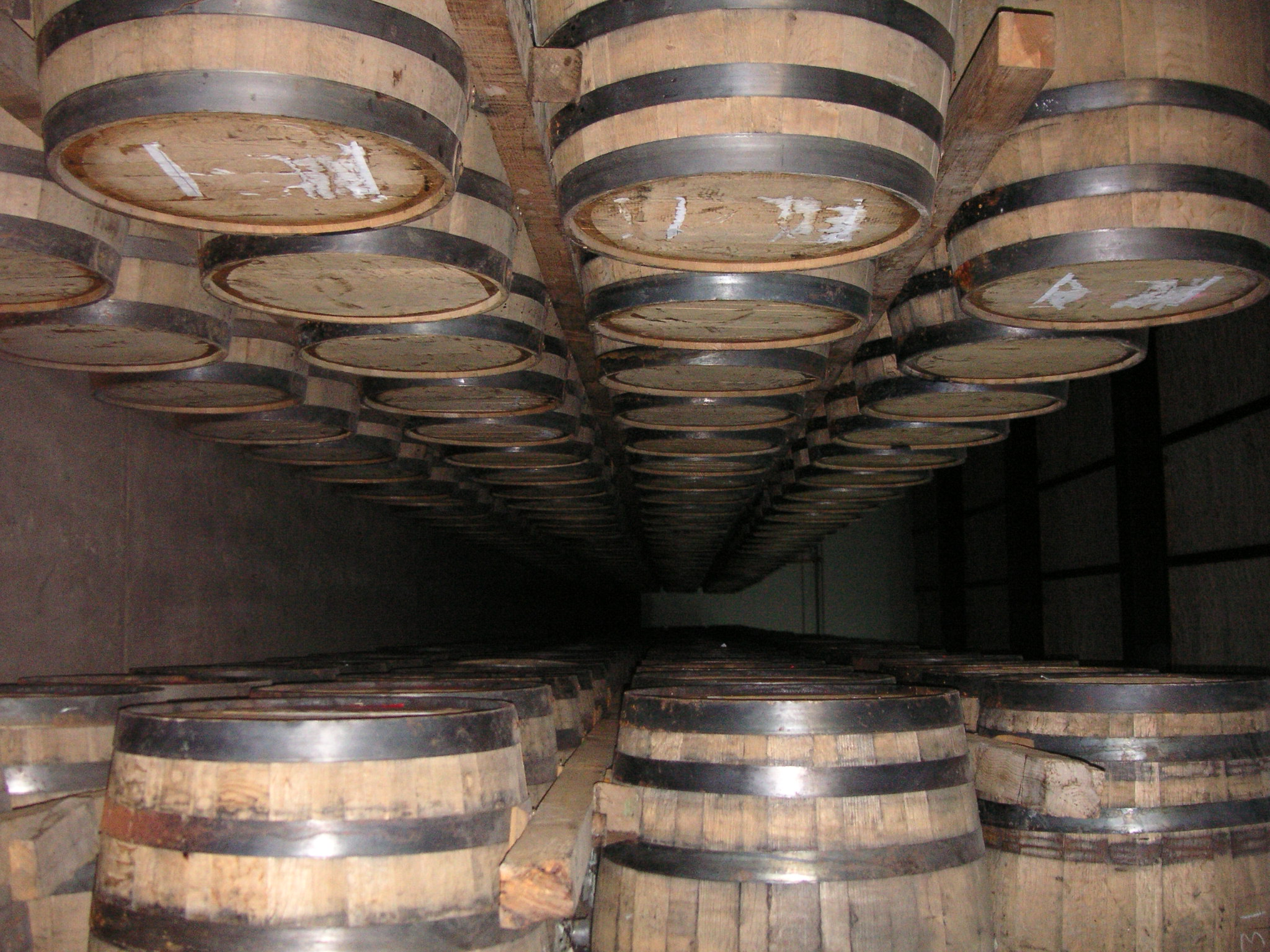
Tequila being rested or aged in oak barrels

Reposado may be rested in oak barrels or casks as large as 20,000 litres (5,280 US gallons), allowing for richer and more complex flavors. The preferred oak comes from the US, France, or Canada, and is usually white oak. Some companies char the wood to impart a smoky flavor or use barrels previously used with different kinds of alcohol (e.g. whiskey or wine). Some reposados can also be aged in new wood barrels to achieve the same woody flavor and smoothness, but in less time.

Añejos are often rested in barrels previously used to rest reposados. The barrels cannot be more than 600 litres (160 US gal), and most are in the 200 litres (53 US gal) range. Many of the barrels used are from whiskey distilleries in the US or Canada, and Jack Daniel's barrels are especially popular. This treatment creates many of the aspects of the dark color and more complex flavors of the añejo tequila. After aging of at least one year, the añejo can be removed from the wood barrels and placed in stainless steel tanks to reduce the amount of evaporation that can occur in the barrels.

=== Threats to quality ===
TMA (tristeza y muerte de agave – "agave depression and death") is a blight that has reduced the production of the agave grown to produce tequila. This has resulted in lower production and higher prices throughout the early 21st century, and due to the long maturation of the plant, will likely continue to affect prices for years to come.

=== "Tequila worm" misconception ===
Only certain mezcals, usually from the state of Oaxaca, are ever sold con gusano (with worm). They are added as a marketing gimmick and are not traditional. The tequila regulatory council does not allow gusanos or scorpions (which are sometimes also added to mezcals) to be included in tequila bottles. The worm in some mezcals is actually the larval form of the moth Hypopta agavis, which lives on the agave plant. Finding one in the plant during processing indicates an infestation and, correspondingly, a lower-quality product. The misconception that tequilas may contain worms continues, despite effort and marketing to represent tequila as a premium liquor.

=== Norma Oficial Mexicana ===
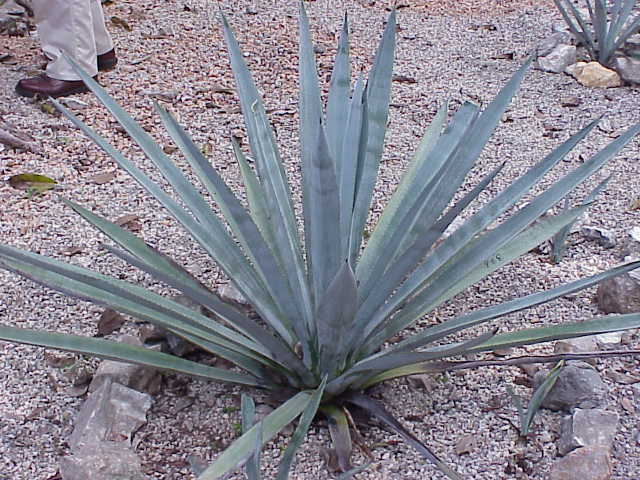
A young agave plant

The Norma Oficial Mexicana (NOM) applies to all processes and activities related to the supply of agave, production, bottling, marketing, information, and business practices linked to the distilled alcoholic beverage known as tequila. Tequila must be produced using agave of the species Tequilana Weber Blue variety, grown in the federal states and municipalities indicated in the Declaration.

Furthermore, the NOM establishes the technical specifications and legal requirements for the protection of the Appellation of Origin of "Tequila" in accordance with the current General Declaration of Protection of the Appellation of Origin of "Tequila", the Law, the Industrial Property Law, the Federal Consumer Protection Law and other related legal provisions.

All authentic, regulated tequilas will have a NOM identifier on the bottle. The important laws since 1990 were NOM-006-SCFI-1993, the later updates NOM-006-SCFI-1994 and NOM-006-SCFI-2005 and the most recent revision published on December 13, 2012, NOM-006-SCFI-2012.

The number after NOM is the distillery number, assigned by the government. NOM does not indicate the location of the distillery, merely the parent company or, in the case where a company leases space in a plant, the physical plant where the tequila was manufactured.

== Storage condition ==
Unlike wine, whose character may change in taste over time and storage conditions, tequila does not change much once bottled, even without ideal storage conditions, much like most other distilled spirits such as whiskey, rum, or vodka. The quality characteristics (flavor, aroma, color, etc.) of a tequila are primarily determined during its aging in wood barrels. To maintain the utmost quality though, some conditions should be met: a constant and moderate temperature (60 to 65 °F), protection from direct sunlight, and maintenance of the integrity of the seal of the bottle. Improper storage conditions will have more effect on the taste of aged tequila rather than the un-aged version, due to tannins and other compounds introduced into the spirit from the aging barrel. For instance, if stored in improper conditions, the dark and more complex flavors of the añejo tequila are more likely to be tainted than the blanco or the silver tequila.

Once the bottle is opened, the tequila will be subject to oxidation that will continue to happen even if no more oxygen is introduced. In addition, if the bottle has more room for air, the process of oxidation occurs faster on the liquor remaining inside the bottle. Therefore, it may be the best to consume the tequila within one or two years after opening. For the most part, the change in quality of tequila is due to extreme conditions of improper storage, not due to oxidation.

== Types ==
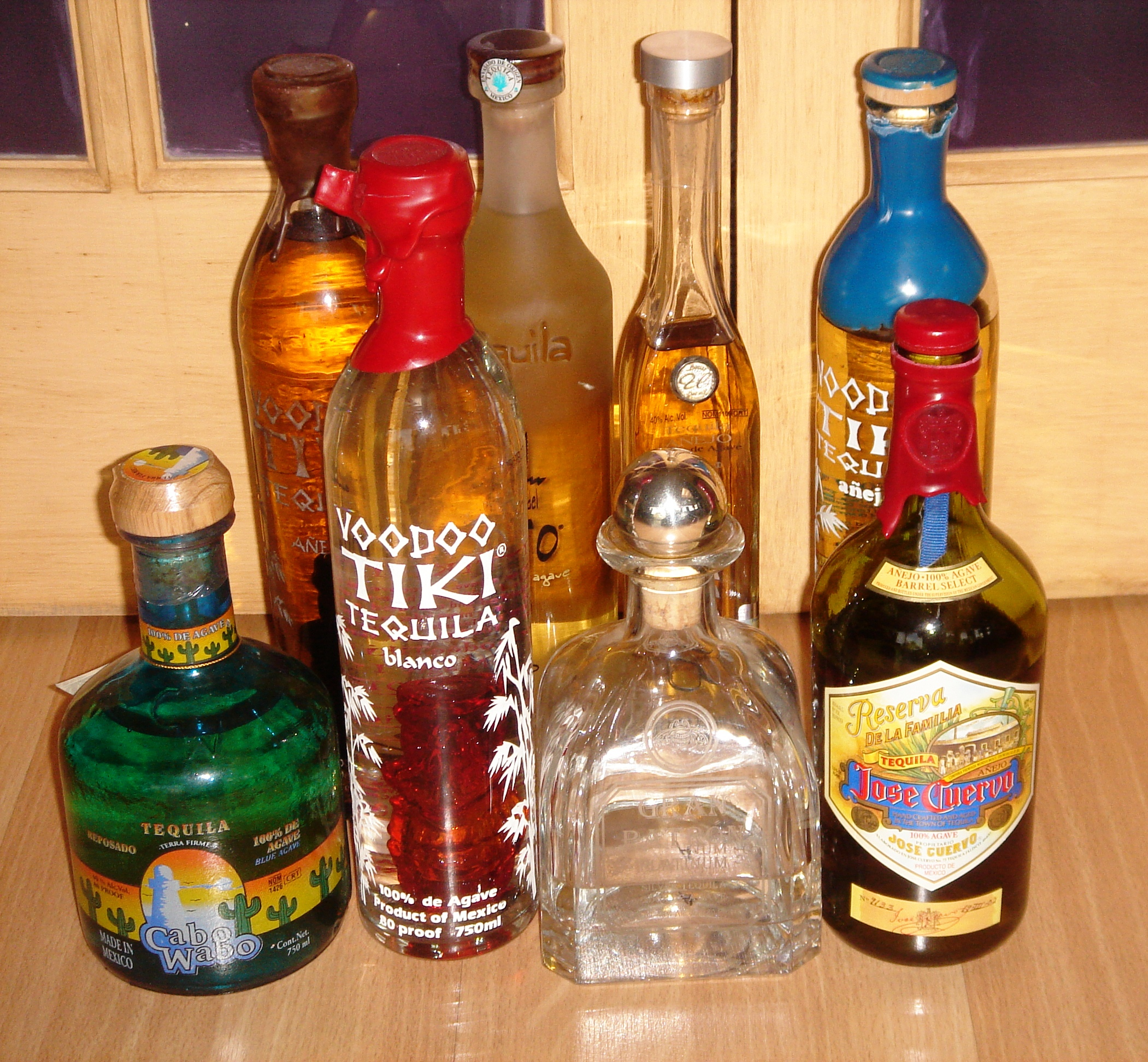
Tequilas of various styles

The two basic categories of tequila are mixtos and 100% agave. Mixtos use no less than 51% agave, with other sugars making up the remainder. Mixtos use both glucose and fructose sugars.

There are five categories of tequila defined by the NOM:

- Blanco [ˈblaŋko] ("white") or plata [ˈplata] ("silver"): white spirit, unaged and bottled or stored immediately after distillation, or aged less than two months in stainless steel or neutral oak barrels
- Joven ("young") or Oro ("gold"): a blend of unaged and aged tequila, or a blanco tequila given a darker tone with the addition of coloring
- Reposado [repoˈsaðo] ("rested"): aged a minimum of two months, but less than a year in oak barrels of any size
- Añejo [aˈɲexo] ("aged" or "vintage"): aged a minimum of one year, but less than three years in small oak barrels
- Extra Añejo ("extra aged" or "ultra aged"): aged a minimum of three years in oak barrels

There are several more categories that are not defined by the NOM, including:

- Cristalino [kɾistaˈlino] ("crystalline"): aged tequila that has been filtered to remove its color before bottling, similar to chill filtering of whisky
- Rosa ("pink"): a young version of the spirit "lightly aged in red wine barrels"

== Brands ==
The Consejo Regulador del Tequila (Tequila Regulatory Council) reported 1377 registered brands from 150 producers for the year 2013.

== Serving ==
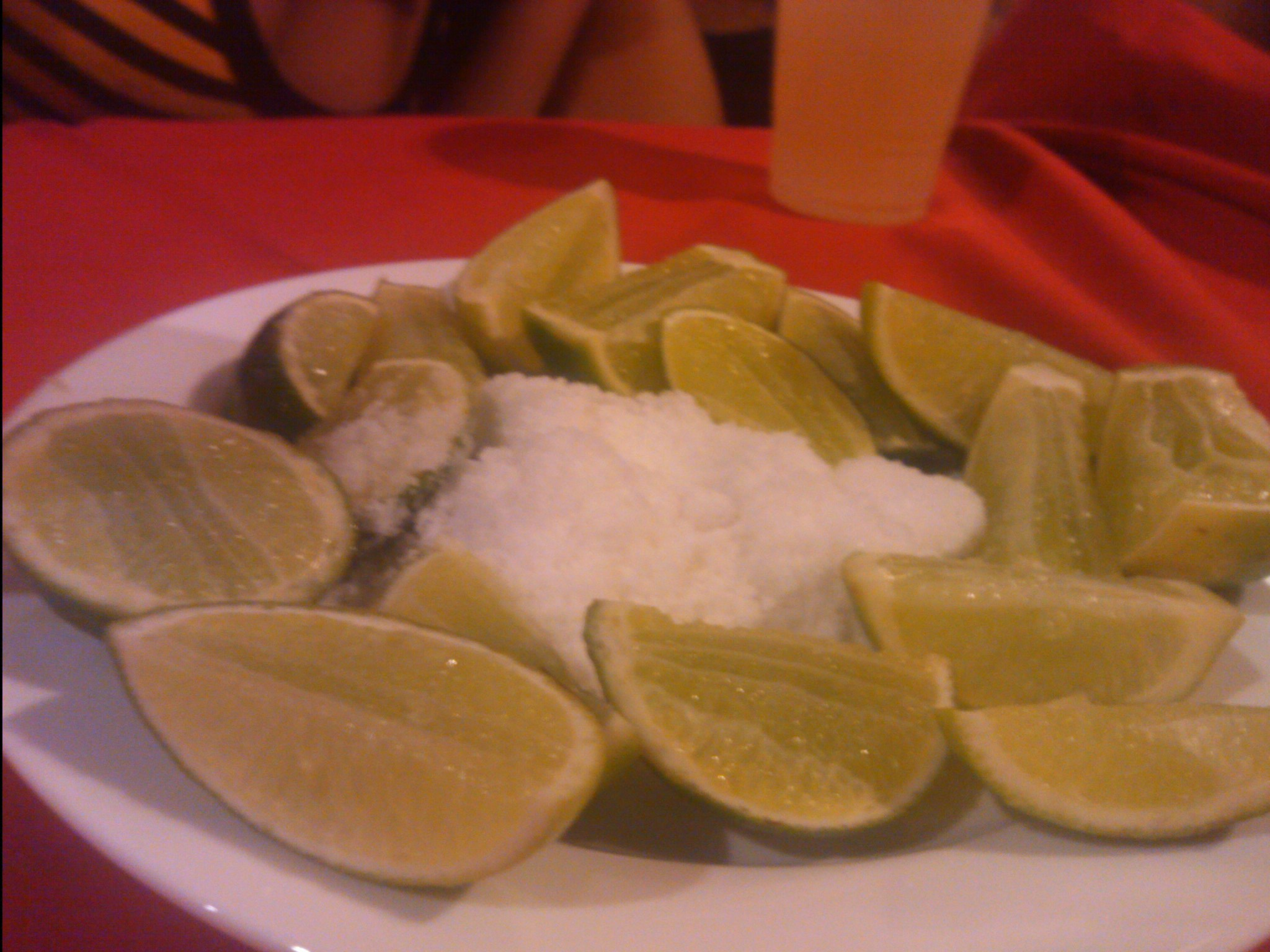
Salt and lime

In Mexico, the most traditional way to drink tequila is neat, without lime and salt. It is popular in some regions to drink fine tequila with a side of sangrita—a sweet, sour, and spicy drink typically made from orange juice, grenadine (or tomato juice), and hot chilli. Equal-sized shots of tequila and sangrita are sipped alternately, without salt or lime. Another popular drink in Mexico is the bandera (flag in Spanish), named after the Flag of Mexico, it consists of three shot glasses, filled with lime juice (for the green), white tequila, and sangrita (for the red).

Outside Mexico, a single shot of tequila is often served with salt and a slice of lime or lemon. This is called tequila cruda and is sometimes referred to as "training wheels", "lick-sip-suck", or "lick-shoot-suck" (referring to the way in which the combination of ingredients is imbibed). The drinkers moisten the back of their hands below the index finger (usually by licking) and pour on the salt. Then the salt is licked off the hand, the tequila is drunk, and the fruit slice is quickly bitten. Groups of drinkers often do this simultaneously. Drinking tequila in this way is often erroneously called a Tequila Slammer, which is in fact a mix of tequila and carbonated drink. Though the traditional Mexican shot is tequila by itself, lime is the fruit of choice when a chaser must be used. The salt is believed to lessen the "burn" of the tequila and the sour fruit balances and enhances the flavor. In Germany and some other countries, tequila oro (gold) is often consumed with cinnamon on a slice of orange after, while tequila blanco (white) is consumed with salt and lime.

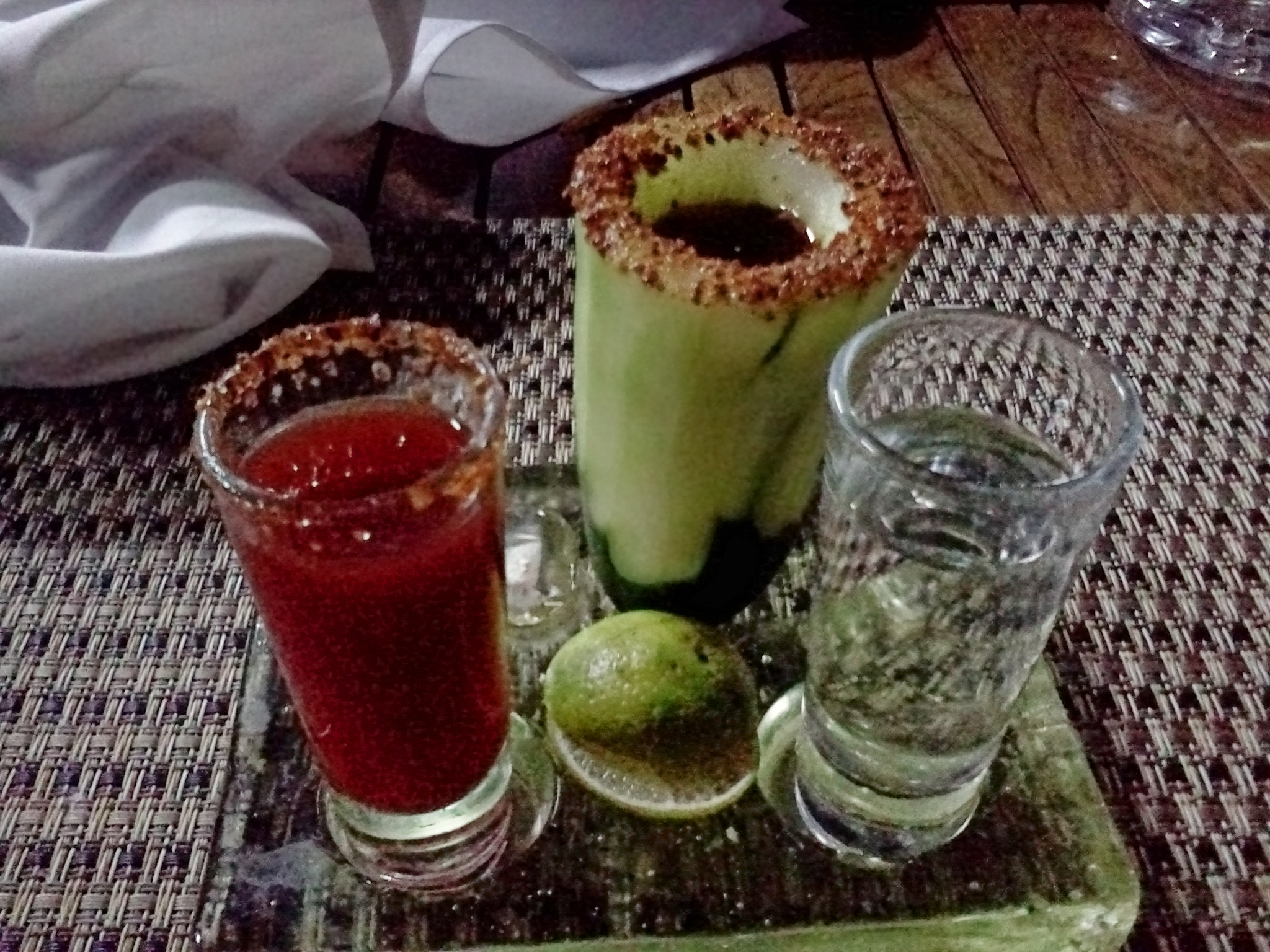
Bandera of Mexican tequila

If the bottle of tequila does not state on the label that it is manufactured from 100% blue agave (no sugars added), then, by default, that tequila is a mixto (manufactured from at least 51% blue agave). Some tequila distilleries label their tequila as "made with blue agave" or "made from blue agave". The Tequila Regulatory Council has stated only tequilas distilled with 100% agave can be designated as "100% agave".

Many of the higher-quality, 100% agave tequilas do not impart significant alcohol burn, and drinking them with salt and lime is likely to remove much of the flavor. These tequilas are usually sipped from a snifter glass rather than a shot glass, and savoured instead of quickly gulped. Doing so allows the taster to detect subtler fragrances and flavors that would otherwise be missed.

=== Tequila glasses ===
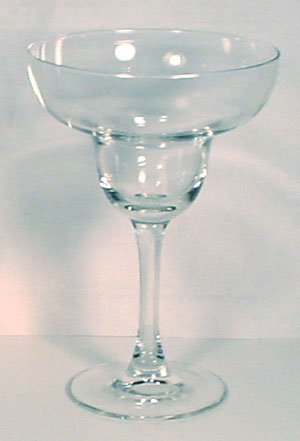
A margarita glass

When served neat (without any additional ingredients), tequila is most often served in a narrow shot glass called a caballito (little horse in Spanish), but can often be found in anything from a snifter to a tumbler.

The Consejo Regulador del Tequila approved an "official tequila glass" in 2002 called the Ouverture Tequila glass, made by Riedel.

The margarita glass, frequently rimmed with salt or sugar, is a staple for the entire genre of tequila-based mixed drinks, including the margarita.

=== Cocktails ===
A variety of cocktails are made with tequila, including the margarita, a cocktail that helped make tequila popular in the United States. The traditional margarita uses tequila, Cointreau, and lime juice, though many variations exist. A popular cocktail in Mexico is the Paloma, which is traditionally a highball of tequila and a grapefruit-flavored soda, but can also be made as a carbonated sour akin to a Tom Collins or gin rickey with tequila, fresh grapefruit juice, simple syrup, and plain carbonated water. Also, a number of martini variants involve tequila, and a large number of tequila drinks are made by adding fruit juice. These include the Tequila Sunrise and the Matador. Sodas and other carbonated drinks are a common mixer, as in the Tequila Slammer. Other popular cocktails are the Acapulco cocktail, Chimayó Cocktail, Mexican martini, Mojito Blanco, Vampiro and Ranch Water.

== IP protection and regulation outside of Mexico ==
Mexican laws state that tequila can be produced only in the state of Jalisco and limited municipalities in the states of Guanajuato, Michoacán, Nayarit, and Tamaulipas. Tequila is recognized as a Mexican designation of origin product in more than 40 countries. It was protected through NAFTA in Canada and the United States until July 2020 and through bilateral agreements with individual countries such as Japan and Israel, and it has been a protected designation of origin product in the European Union since 1997.

The Mexican government took initiatives to protect tequila as early as the 1970s. Tequila became the country's first appellation of origin (AO) in 1974, and in 1978 it was internationally registered for protection under the Lisbon Agreement for the Protection of Appellations of Origin and their International Registration. The AO defines the area in which tequila can be produced, essentially the area home to the blue agave from which it is derived. Under the AO, selected municipalities within only five Mexican states can grow the agave and produce tequila. These municipalities were selected based on geographical factors (such as climate, altitude and soil characteristics) and human factors (the use of traditional techniques of producing tequila that have been passed on from generation to generation).

Further to the AO registration, the Mexican government holds all the rights over the use of the name tequila.

Along with the international protection, Mexico has also sought similar protection for tequila in other important countries and regions through a number of bilateral and multilateral agreements. Pursuant to Annex 313 of the North American Free Trade Agreement (NAFTA), Canada and the United States recognize tequila and mezcal as products originating from Mexico and, consequently, do not permit the sale of any product as tequila and/or mezcal unless they have been lawfully prepared in Mexico.

The Mexican government enforces the tequila intellectual property through the Mexican Institute of Industrial Property (IMPI). The use of the name tequila is authorized and administered only by IMPI. IMPI may prohibit any unauthorized use of the name that may create confusion for the consumers, or constitute an act of unfair competition.

Despite protection under the Lisbon Agreement and NAFTA, tequila still faced competition from some pseudo tequilas. During the mid-1990s, as much as 3.5 million liters of these liquors were sold annually in Europe. The European liquors were produced from sugars of agave-like plants and were illegally labeled as tequila. Following the NAFTA precedent, Mexico entered into a bilateral agreement with the European Union concerning the mutual recognition and protection of AO in the spirits sector. Under this agreement the EU recognizes tequila and mezcal as "denominations of origin", although enforcement has still been quite lax in Europe.

Mexico's tequila protection interests were prominent during the Chinese accession negotiations to the World Trade Organization. In accordance with WTO accession regulations, in order to gain considerations for WTO membership, China had to sign bilateral agreements with all existing members, including Mexico. Since China has a climatic condition suitable for blue agave plants, Mexico was worried about rival pseudo tequilas from China. The Mexican authorities took the opportunity of the bilateral negotiations with China to ensure that the latter accepted tequila as a geographically indicated product.

=== Canada ===
Under Canadian regulations (C.R.C., c.870, section B.02.90), any product labelled, advertised, or sold as tequila must be manufactured in Mexico, as it would be for consumption in Mexico. Once imported to Canada for sale, it is legal for tequila to be diluted with distilled or otherwise purified water to adjust it to the desired strength and then sold.

=== United States ===
Similar to the law of Canada, the U.S. law (27 CFR 5.148) says that tequila must be "made in Mexico, in compliance with the laws and regulations of Mexico governing the manufacture of Tequila for consumption in that country."

== See also ==
- Bacanora
- Beer in Mexico
- Crudités
- Kahlúa
- Mexican cuisine
- Mexican wine
- Mezcal
- National Museum of Tequila
- Pulque
- Raicilla
