= Olinalá =

City in the Mexican state of Guerrero

- Municipal seat and city
- Location in Mexico Olinalá (Mexico)
- Coordinates: 17°50′N 98°51′W
- Country: Mexico
- State: Guerrero
- Municipality: Olinalá
- Time zone: UTC-6 (Zona Centro)

Olinalá is a city and seat of the municipality of Olinalá, in the Mexican state of Guerrero. It is well known throughout the country for its crafts, called Lacas de Olinalá (Olinalá lacquers).

== Art ==
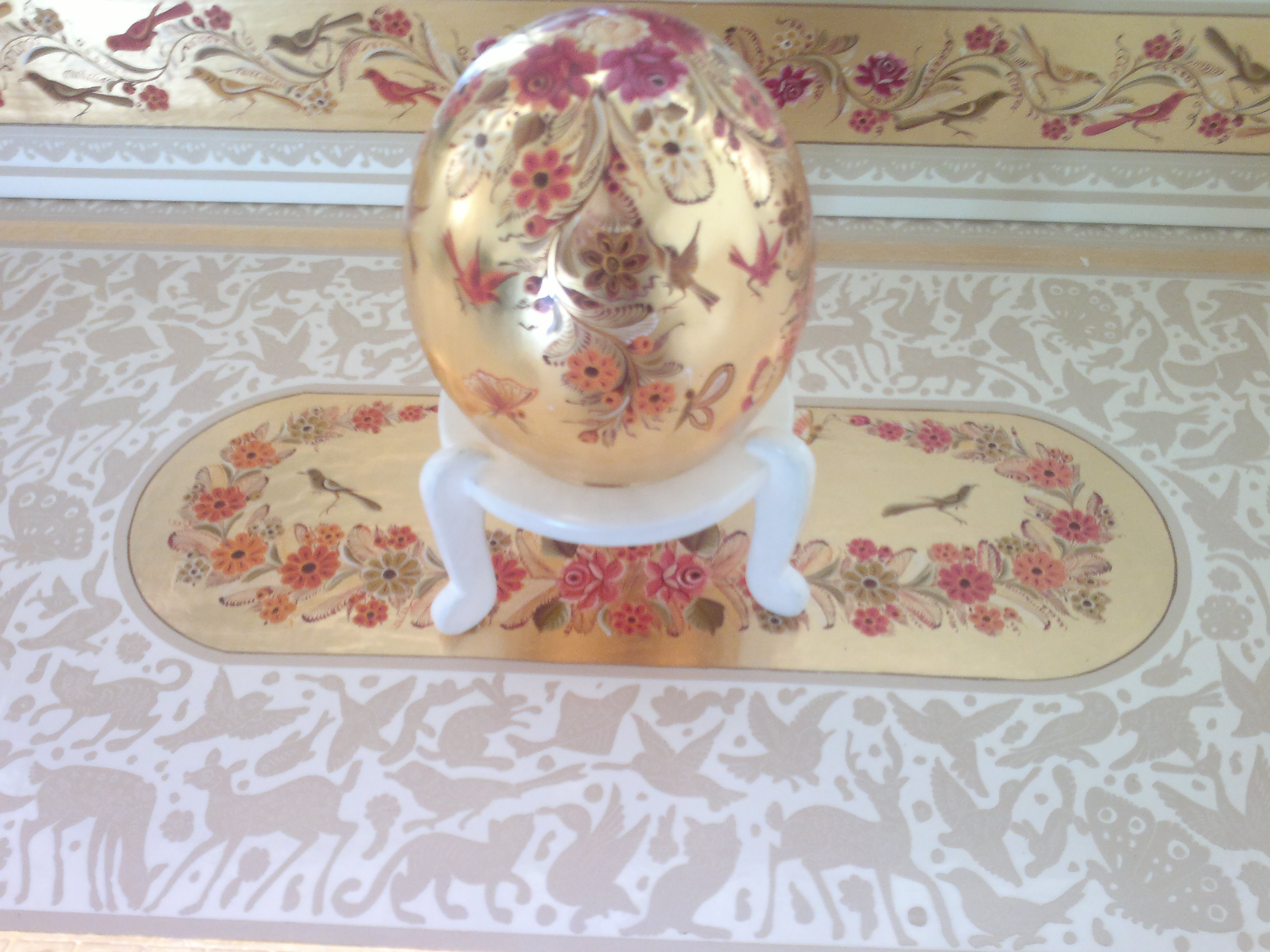
Lacquered gourd (genus Lagenaria) in imitation of a Fabergé egg

Olinalá is located in the state of Guerrero. It is considered the most important center for the production of lacquer in Mexico.

In Olinalá there are artisan workshops that have passed the techniques for lacquer production from generation to generation since the technique arrived from Asia via the Spanish "Manila Galleon" trading ships also known as the Nao de la China. The wide variety of products made using these techniques range from everyday use objects, such as trays, chests, folding screens, to famous decorative lacquered boxes known as "cajitas de Olinalá".

There are different techniques involved in the decoration of these works: golden on the lacquered wood is made with a very fine paintbrush made of cat hair. The "rayado vaciado" with two layers of lacquer; the "rayado punteado" and traditional decorations with bright colors. Each work is let dry for various days before applying the last step: a varnish with linseed oil.

The motifs in the decorations also vary. Generally, they are nature themes, and can range from flowers, foliages and landscapes to animals (including rabbits, foxes, jaguars, cats and deer based on Nahuatl mythology, with a strong preference for the rabbit). The result is a perfectly finished work, of lively colors and entirely unique, either on carved wood products or gourds.

These crafts are part of a long and laborious process that involves approximately 29 steps.

During the manufacturing process of Olinala products, the wood is smeared with vegetable or insect oils before being covered in a thick paste that is made of raw materials based on minerals called tecoztle in the Nahuatl language. This paste has a sand-like texture, is yellowish in color and is mixed with oils from the seeds of the Mexican chia plant (salvia hispanica lamiaceae) or flaxseed (linum usitatissimum linaceae).

When spread over the wood’s surface, the paste forms the base for the next step in the process which involves a mixture of tesicalte and is ground in a stone container known as a tlalmetate until it becomes a very fine powder. The powder is added to the color that will become the artifact’s background and the resulting mixture is smeared onto the wood using a deer’s tail brush.

The wood is polished until virtually all of the tesicalte vanishes. The base color is added thereafter and left to dry for a couple of days before adding lacquer and giving polish. Applying lacquer to such goods protects the surface and provides the opportunity for further decoration.

All the key ingredients and products from Olinala, which stands at 1,600 meters above sea level and represents the highest point in the state, are sourced from the Guerrero region itself.

By enacting the Law for the Promotion and Protection of Industrial Property in 1991, the Mexican government recognized a need to promote the country’s heritage and businesses while protecting its producers from unfair competition. In 1993, Olinalá craftsmen applied for an Appellation of Origin for Olinala at the Instituto Mexicano de la Propiedad Industrial (IMPI), which was approved in 1995.
