= John Rexer =

American entrepreneur and writer

- Born: 1961 (age 64–65); Huntington, New York, United States
- Education: Columbia University
- Occupations: entrepreneur and writer
- Known for: founder and CEO of Ilegal Mezcal
- Notable work: Café No Sé, a bar in Antigua Guatemala; La Cuadra Magazine

John Rexer (born 1961) is an American entrepreneur and writer who is the founder and chief executive officer of Ilegal Mezcal, an artisanal mezcal brand. He is also the co-founder of La Cuadra Magazine, an English-language quarterly based in Antigua, Guatemala.

== Early life and education ==
Rexer was born in 1961 in Huntington, New York. He attended Columbia University. After university, he pursued writing and extensive travel before settling in Guatemala in 2003.

== Career ==
In 2004, Rexer opened Café No Sé, a bar in Antigua, Guatemala. To supply the bar, he sourced mezcal from producers in Oaxaca, Mexico. In 2006, he established the Ilegal Mezcal brand, in a joint initiative with Oaxacan distillers Armando and Alvaro Hernández. The mezcal is produced using traditional methods from espadín agave.

In 2010, Ilegal Mezcal began exporting to the United States and later moved its headquarters to New York City. Between 2015 and 2016, Bacardi acquired a minority stake in the brand. In September 2023, Bacardi acquired full ownership of Ilegal Mezcal. Rexer remained associated with the brand following the acquisition.

In 2005, Rexer co-founded La Cuadra Magazine, an English-language quarterly based in Antigua, where he served as editor for approximately a decade.

In 2024, Ilegal Mezcal and founder John Rexer were featured on the 60 Minutes program broadcast by CBS in a segment about the global rise of mezcal. Rexer discussed the origins of the brand and the tension between preserving artisanal traditions and meeting growing international demand. In the same year, he was named on the Worthy 100 list.
