= Ilegal Mezcal =

Brand of Mezcal

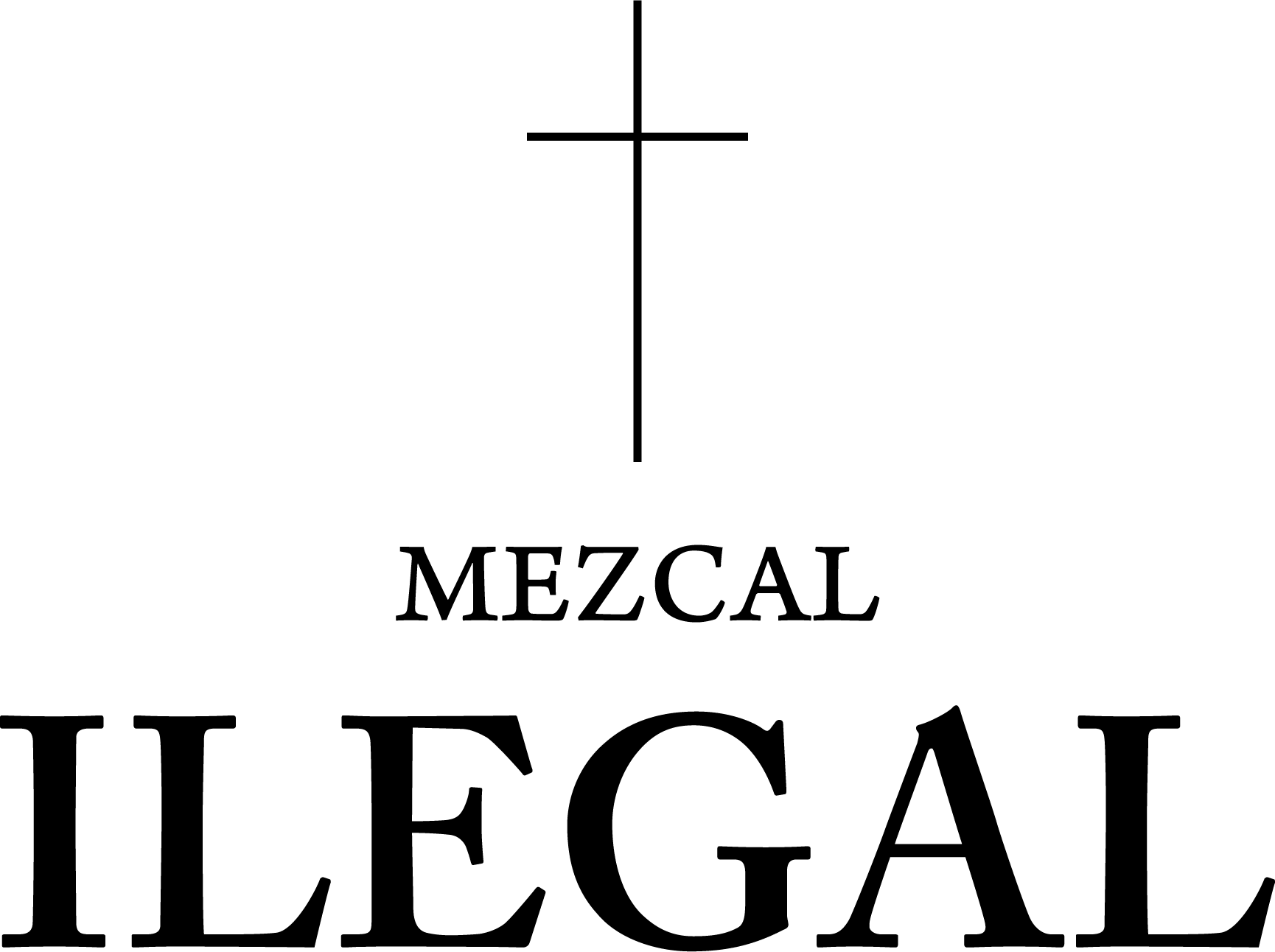
- Type: Subsidiary
- Industry: Alcoholic beverage
- Founded: 2004 (in Antigua, Guatemala)
- Founder: John Rexer
- Headquarters: Brooklyn, New York, U.S.
- Area served: Worldwide
- Products: Mezcal
- Parent: Bacardi
- Website: ilegalmezcal.com

Ilegal Mezcal is a brand of mezcal founded in 2006 by John Rexer in Antigua, Guatemala. It originated as a spirit for Rexer's bar, Café No Sé, and is produced in Oaxaca, Mexico, in partnership with local mezcal producers.

Ilegal Mezcal produces mezcal from Espadín agave using traditional methods. It later grew into a high-volume mezcal brand and was acquired by Bacardi in 2023. Ilegal is also associated with its namesake cocktail, the "Ilegal".

== History ==
John Rexer opened the bar Café No Sé in Antigua, Guatemala, in the early 2000s. In 2004, he began informally importing mezcal from Oaxaca, Mexico, for use at the bar. In 2006, Rexer formalized the operation under the Ilegal Mezcal brand, a name referencing its unofficial origins. Later, Rexer partnered with Armando and Alvaro Hernandez, fourth-generation mezcal producers from Santiago Matatlán, Oaxaca, working at their distillery, Mal de Amor.

By the early 2010s, Ilegal Mezcal began exporting to the United States and other countries. In 2015, Bacardi Limited became a distributor and acquired a minority stake of approximately 20%. In September 2023, Bacardi completed its full acquisition of the brand.

== Operations ==
Ilegal Mezcal is produced in Oaxaca, Mexico, primarily at the Mal de Amor distillery in Santiago Matatlán. The mezcal is made from Espadín agave using traditional methods, including roasting the agave piñas in earthen ovens, crushing them with a tahona stone mill, natural fermentation, and double distillation in copper stills.

Its core range includes a Joven (unaged), a Reposado (aged approximately six months in American oak), and an Añejo (aged 13 months in new and used oak). Ilegal was among the earlier brands to introduce barrel-aged reposado and añejo expressions. In late 2022, Ilegal released a limited 7-year Añejo aged in French oak.

Ilegal bottles its mezcal in 100% recycled glass, which the company reports uses less energy and produces lower CO₂ emissions than standard glass.

== Activism ==
Ilegal Mezcal has engaged in political activism. In 2015, the brand launched the "Donald Eres Un Pendejo" campaign in response to statements made by then-presidential candidate Donald Trump. The campaign included posters, murals, and projections on buildings, including Union Square in Manhattan in March 2017. Proceeds raised during the campaign were used to support nonprofit organizations such Planned Parenthood, the ACLU, and Niños de Guatemala.

== Awards ==
Ilegal Mezcal Reposado was named "Best Reposado" in Esquire magazine's 2023 Spirit Awards. The Ilegal 7-Year Añejo received a Double Gold Medal at the 2023 San Francisco World Spirits Competition.
