= Industrial history of Monterrey =

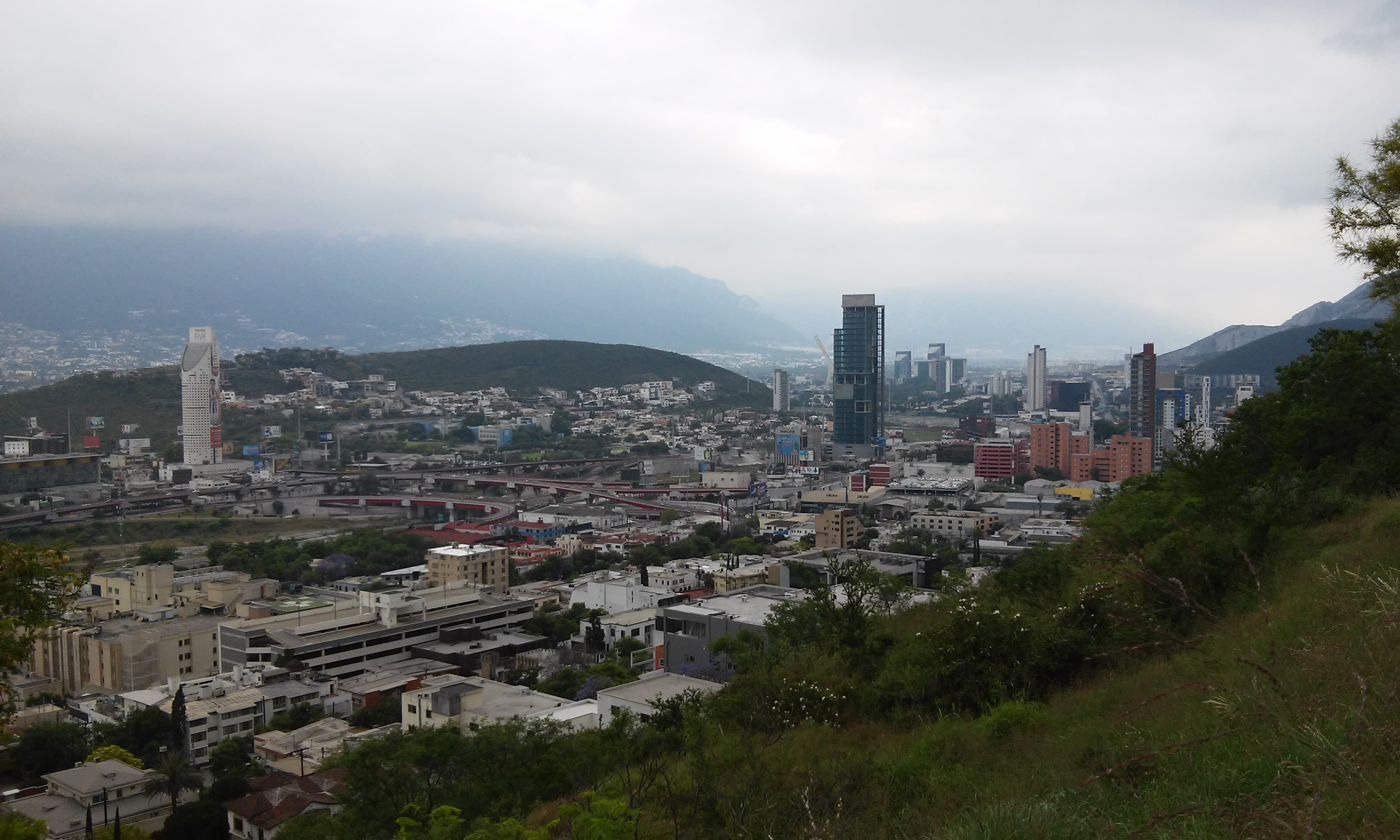
Monterrey

Monterrey is one of the most important and wealthiest cities in Mexico. Being the third-largest metropolitan area in Mexico, Monterrey serves as a commercial center of the north of the country. Its huge commercial centers and industries are consequences of its big industrialization after the end of the Second French Intervention War (1861–1867). Before this event happened, Monterrey served as a distribution center of imported goods to the north of the country.

The industrial and economic development of the state came in several phases, starting at the end of the Second French Intervention, followed by the development of the industry in the state, and the boom of industrialization before the Mexican Revolution. These three phases dictated the industrial path of Monterrey, each one of them having its own consequences in this process.

During the year 1867, several important changes initiated in the city of Monterrey starting its industrialization: the falling of the commerce in the city, the development of communications, the development of agriculture, development of new industries, and other several changes. Monterrey changed from a distribution center of imported goods to an industrial state in a period of two decades.

== Beginning of Monterrey's economy ==
Monterrey's economy began to flourish in 1820 when the Refugio port in what is now Matamoros was inaugurated. Subsequently, in 1823, the port of Tampico was also opened, further boosting the city's economic prospects. The strategic geographical location of these ports played a crucial role in Monterrey's economic development. Monterrey served as the primary gateway to the central region of Mexico due to its unique position within the Sierra Madre Occidental mountain range system. Consequently, it became a pivotal distribution hub for the northern states of Mexico, including Coahuila, Zacatecas, Durango, Chihuahua, and others.

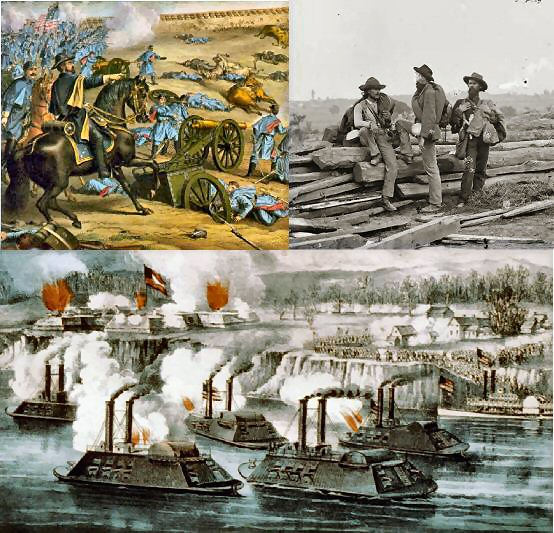
American Civil War (12 of April 1861 – 13 of May 1865)

=== American Civil War ===
Another significant event that contributed to the economic development of Monterrey was the American Civil War. During this conflict, the ports in the United States were blockaded, which led to an increased use of the northern Mexican ports for the distribution of cotton to Europe. Monterrey's customs authorities had control over these ports, resulting in a substantial influx of capital into the city. While this had positive implications for Monterrey's economy, the situation changed after the conclusion of the American Civil War, when trade with the United States resumed, impacting the city's commerce.

=== Falling of the commerce ===
The early development of the city economy was caused by several abnormal events. For example, constant revolutions in the country, establishment of the free zone in the neighbor state Tamaulipas, and the American Civil War. These abnormal events created a constant development on Monterrey's economy. After these events stopped, an inevitable decrease in the city's economy started. Some researches stated that the city could not get again in the same position that was during the city economy development, because it was caused by the abnormal events mentioned before. Despite this, there are other two main reasons why the commerce in Monterrey started to decrease: the creation of the “Constraresguardos” and the development of railways in the country.

One of the reasons was the creation of the mobile force “Contraresguardo”. This was a mobile force that was in charge of traveling along far paths and roads to stop clandestine imports. Smuggling was an important economic activity in many towns of Monterrey bringing capital flow into commerce. The creation of this anti-smuggling force caused the decrease of the activity, affecting the economy of many families and commerce in Monterrey. The anti-smuggling forces raised important amounts of money from the smugglings that were stopped: during the years 1869–1870 several contrabands were stopped with a value of $213,415 pesos, in the next year this value increased by $844,542, and during the years 1874–75 a total of 148 contraband were stopped by these forces.

Another important factor for the decrease in commerce in Monterrey was the development of railways in the country. Before this development, Monterrey served as a distribution center for the north states of the country, thanks to its geographical position. The development of railways allowed the north states of the country to get products from other routes, without the intervention of Monterrey. Also, the railways created contrabands in small scale, as people were allowed to go to the frontier easily and in a cheap way, smuggling products. The small-scale contraband affected all kind of commerce in Monterrey, didn't letting them develop.

=== Communications development ===
An important factor in Monterrey's industrialization was the development of communications throughout the state. The development of railways, telegraphs, telephones and trams started a new chapter in Monterrey's transportation and communication era, leaving behind the mule drivers, drivers, and diligence drivers.

Before this new era, the opening of routes was an important topic for the government. Monterrey had several routes that connected it with other neighbor states like Matamoros, Laredo, Tampico, Piedras Negras, Saltillo, etc. These routes where controlled and managed by the municipalities, who didn't take care of them, leaving them in bad shape. Even though, the traffic between this dirt routes were high. The most common mean of transport to transport products, before the development of railways, was by convoys: groups of wagons pulled by mules. Also, the most common way of transporting people between states before the railway, was by the use of errands.

==== Railways ====
The first railway track was inaugurated in 1881, it connected the cities of Monterrey and Matamoros. Other railways were also created to connect Monterrey to other cities in this new mean of transport: Laredo, Saltillo, Lampazos, Salinas Victoria, Cadereyta, Torreon, San Luis Potosí, Mexico, and also with the United States. These new routes of railway boost the movement of large group of people around the state and country in a cheap and effective way. These new railways also helped to present the city of Monterrey in a national and international context. People from outside the city came, especially from the United States, for vacations or business trips.

==== Telegraph ====
The telegraph was one of the first communication development in the city, before the railways. The first line of telegraph was built 12 years before the first railway track in the city. The telegraph created a communication line between Monterrey and the center of Mexico. Also, the cities of Matamoros, Saltillo, San Luis Potosí, Ciudad Victoria, Nuevo Laredo, etc. These new lines of telegraph communications followed almost the same lines as the routes of railways.

==== Trams ====
One of the first means of urban transportation was the tram. The first tram was built in 1882 by the government of the state. Later, permissions to build more tram routes around the city were delivered to private companies. By the year of 1891, most of the tram lines were managed by four private companies who had a total of 40 kilometers of tram lines, 58 wagons and 17 loading platforms. All of these track lines connected the urban and rural zones of Monterrey.

==== Telephone ====
In 1882, the telephone was installed in the city of Monterrey. The purpose of the first line of telephones was for the use of the government, connecting the house of General Treviño with the headquarters in the city. The use of telephones for public purposes was established in 1883. By the next year, it already had 91 subscriptions, 256 telephone devices, and 300 kilometers of telephone line.

=== Agriculture ===
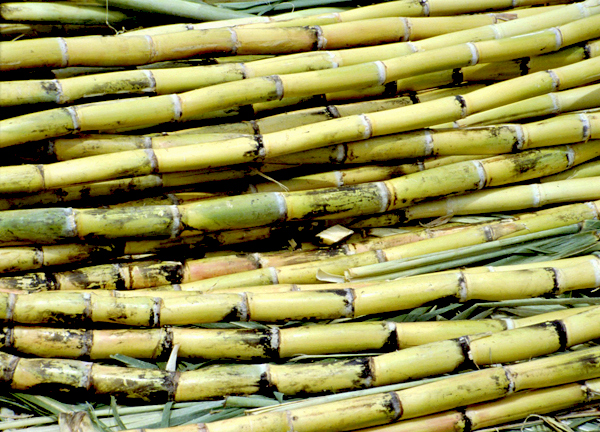
Sugar Cane

Before the industrialization of Monterrey, agriculture and cattle raising were the most important economic activities of the city. Monterrey was an exporting city, exporting to the rest of the country corn and sugar cane. Even though corn was the most agricultural product produced in the city, sugar can was the most profitable. Piloncillo was a very profitable product and it was extracted from the sugar cane. Monterrey was one of the most important cities that exported this product to the country. Also, cattle raising was an important activity for the city, but throughout the years, it was being substituted by the agriculture. This decrease in cattle production was also caused by other factor besides the growing agricultural activity in the city. It was caused also by the cattle theft, attacks of barbarian Indians to the farms, revolutions through the state and droughts. In the year of 1890, the rural activities of the city were in development, having an increase in agricultural and cattle raising production.

=== Development of new industries in Monterrey ===
Before the fall of commerce in Monterrey, huge amount of capital flowed into the city. This gave a lot of economic resources to families and businessmen of the region. After the fall of commerce in the city, this families and businessmen started to look for new industries in which they could invest their resources. The industries that were developed by these investments were in the areas of mining, railways and customs, textiles, and livestock companies. After these investments, the industrialization of Monterrey was initiated.

The textile industry was one of the first industries developed in Monterrey. The first textile companies were called “La Fama”, which was founded in 1854 by an investment group, and “El Porvenir”, founded in 1871. After this two companies were founded, more little textile industries were created in the region, causing that the textile industry was an important activity for the city of Monterrey after several years.

Other new industries that were founded in Monterrey during the same period were little workshops and handcrafts. The main objective of the workshops was to create tools for agricultural purposes, creating wheat mills, floats, and other agricultural tools. Other new industries developed were hat, ice, floats, and cars, sugar and mezcal, beer, pasta, starch, candles production. These small industries became the beginning of the industrialization of Monterrey.

All these new industries that were developed started to change the way of thinking of the government, businesses and people in Monterrey. The idea that the industrialization of the city was the solution for the future of the state was starting to appear. The government and business started to foment the industrialization in all the aspects of the economy. An important tool to expand this idea through the state and to present Monterrey's product to the country and internationally was by the use of expositions. In these expositions, products were presented in four different categories: industry, labor, mechanical arts and arts. All these expositions helped the community to get to know all the products that were produced in Monterrey and the innovations on them. The products of Monterrey reached exposition in the United States like the exposition of New Orleans in 1885, Paris in 1889, and San Antonio in 1889. These expositions were an important platform for the world to get to know Monterrey as an industrial center.

== Industrialization of Monterrey ==
In 1889, the first significant industries contributing to industrialization were established in Monterrey: the Fabrica de Cerveza y Hielo de Monterrey, specializing in beer production, and the Fundicion de Fierro y Elaboracion de Maquinaria Monterrey, involved in the foundry and machinery manufacturing industry. The establishment of these two industries in Monterrey sparked a wave of concessions for the creation of new industries within the city. Over the following years, numerous industries emerged, spanning a wide range of sectors including furniture, metalworking, textiles, cigarettes, soap, and more. Within a span of just three years, Monterrey witnessed the founding of 14 new industries.

=== Causes of industrialization ===
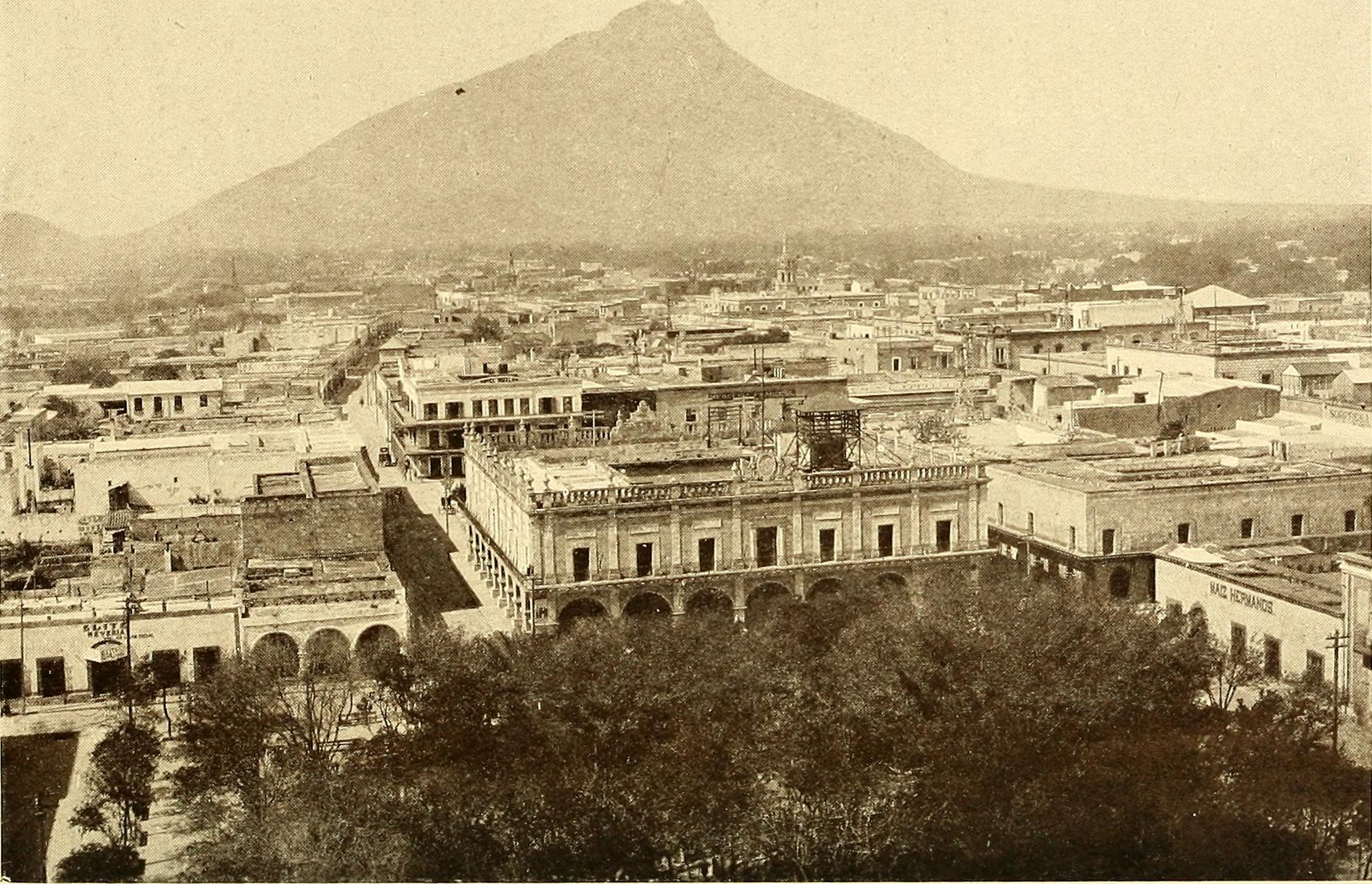
Monterrey, 1910

The industrial boom in Monterrey was driven by a combination of internal and external factors. Internal factors were those that directly related to the city's residents and businesses, while external factors encompassed influences originating outside of Monterrey's borders. Both sets of factors played significant roles in the development of the city's industrial sector.

==== External factors ====
One of the external factors contributing to Monterrey's industrialization was the high tariffs imposed by the United States government, particularly on metal sales. These exorbitant rates led to the establishment of metal industries in Monterrey, allowing them to circumvent the high costs. Monterrey held a strategic advantage over other affected cities as it had connections to several key mining centers in the country, reducing the expenses associated with transporting coal required for the mining industry.

Another significant external factor driving Monterrey's industrialization was international investment in the city. Many of the businesses and entrepreneurs who invested in new industries within the city hailed from outside Mexico. Their substantial capital injections placed the city in a favorable position for future development, benefiting its residents and government alike.

==== Internal factors ====
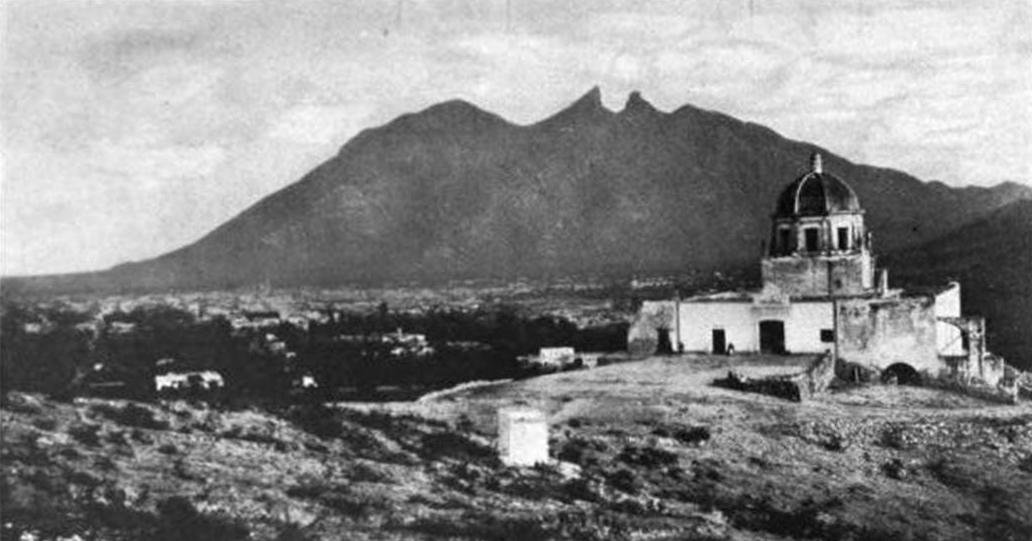
Monterrey, 1904

Several crucial factors contributed to the rapid industrialization of Monterrey during this period:

Government Policies: The local government in Monterrey played a pivotal role by offering tax reductions and providing land to individuals and businesses interested in establishing new industries. These policies created a favorable environment for entrepreneurs to thrive.

Capital Resources: Early commerce in the city generated substantial economic resources. Some citizens and businesses in Monterrey had access to significant capital, which they were willing to invest in industrial ventures. This availability of capital was a key driver of industrialization.

Skilled Workforce: Monterrey boasted a large pool of skilled craftsmen. These individuals were highly valuable to industries because they possessed expertise in operating machinery and contributing to the production of various goods.

Geographical Proximity to the United States: Monterrey's geographic location made it the nearest significant Mexican city to the United States' frontier and industrial areas. This proximity facilitated cultural and economic exchange, enabling Monterrey's citizens to study or work in the United States. This cross-border interaction brought new ideas and processes back to Monterrey's industrial sector.

These factors collectively contributed to Monterrey's remarkable industrial growth during this period.

== Industrial expansion ==
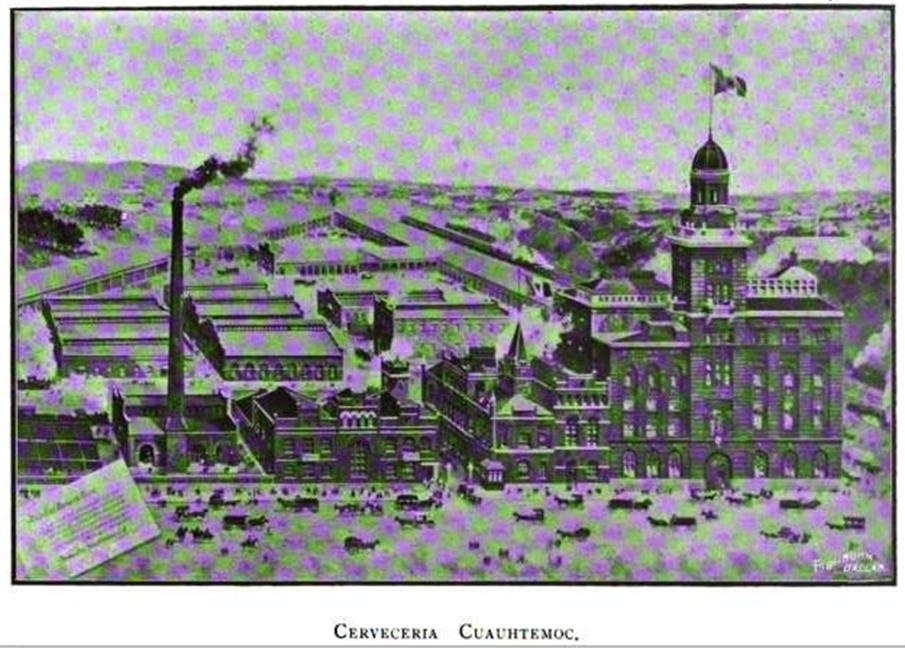
Cerveceria Cuauhtemoc, 1890

Monterrey's industrialization continued for another 20 years but came to a halt during the Mexican Revolution. Throughout this two-decade period, the city's industries continued to flourish and expand. Among the most significant and highly developed industries during this time were:

- Metal Plants (Nuevo León Smelting and Manufacturing Company Limited, the American Smelting and Refining Company ASARCO, Compañia Minera, Fundidora y Afinadora Monterrey, La Gran Fundacion Nacional Mexicana)
- Cerveceria Cuauhtemoc
- Fundidora de Fierro y Acero
- Glass Industry (Fábrica de Vidrios y Cristales, S.A.)
- Cementos Hidalgo
- Industry for construction materials.
- Textile industry

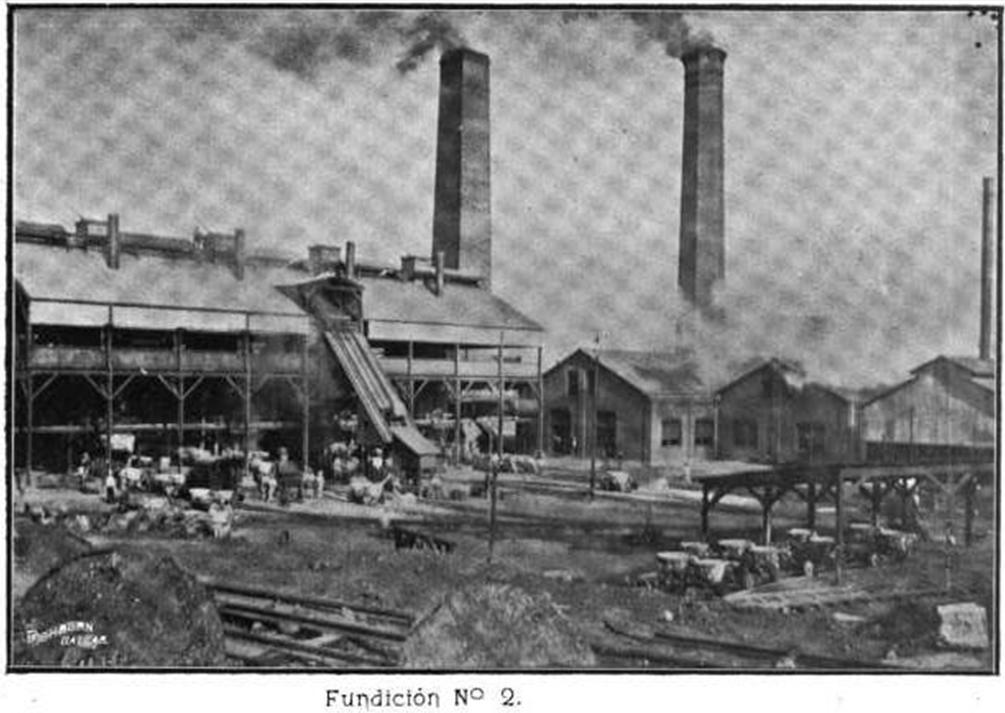
Fundidora de Fierro y Acero, 1920

This industrialization revitalized commerce in the city, spurring new trade and investments in Monterrey. It led to an increase in the capital flowing into the city and its businesses. The population of Monterrey also grew as a result of its industrialization and commercial appeal, attracting businessmen and families from other states. This industrialization further contributed to the development of Monterrey in terms of urbanization, lifestyle, and education, benefiting its citizens, industries, and commerce.
