= Illegal =

Illegal may refer to:

== Law ==
- Violation of law
  - Crime, an act committed in violation of criminal law
- An illegal immigrant

== Entertainment ==
=== Literature ===
- The Illegal (novel) (2015), by Canadian writer Lawrence Hill
- The Illegals, a 2025 nonfiction book by Shaun Walker

=== Film and television ===
- Illegal (1932 film), British
- Illegal (1955 film), American
- Illegal (2010 film), Belgian
- Illegal - Justice, Out of Order, an Indian web series
- The Illegal (2019), film starring Suraj Sharma

=== Music ===
- Illegal (group), a 1990s rap group
- Los Illegals, a music band
- "Illegal" (Shakira song), 2005
- "Illegal" (PinkPantheress song), 2025
- The Illegals, a backing band for American musician Phil Anselmo
- Illegal, a 2006 compilation album by Panjabi MC

== Food and drink ==
- Ilegal Mezcal, a brand of mezcal from Guatemala
  - Illegal (cocktail), a cocktail made with Ilegal Mezcal

== See also ==
- Illegal agent, also known as "non-official cover_(intelligence_gathering)"
- Illegals Program, Russian spies arrested in the United States in 2010
- Illegalism, an anarchist philosophy which embraced criminality as a lifestyle
