= Kairos Futura =

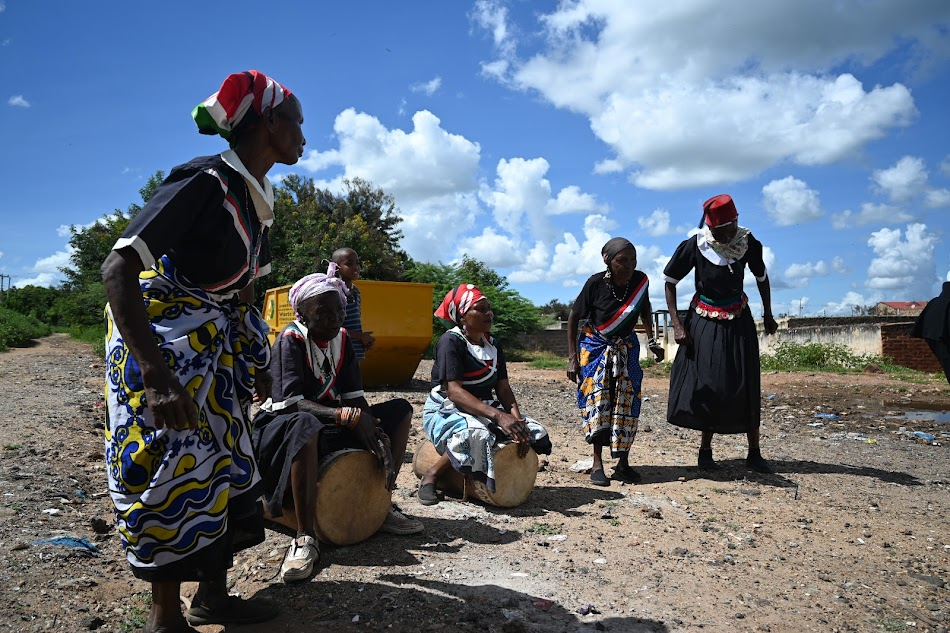
participants of the kamba Community Performing a ritual at a dump site in kibwezi kenya

Kairos Futura is an arts futurist organization founded in 2021 in Nairobi, Kenya. They operate between Kenya and the United States. Kairos Futura received the 2025 S+T+ARTS Grand Prize Award for their project Wild Future Lab. They also presented The Ministry of Biosymphony at Milan Design Week in 2025 Through extensive research, community engagement, collaboration with cultural practitioners worldwide and an immersive research approach into rural communities, Kairos combines community knowledge with craftsmanship to visualise immediate futures.

== History and early works ==
The foundations of Kairos Futura began with community-based art experiments in Nairobi. Their first project addressed local tensions surrounding urban tree-planting initiatives in the Mathare, Kenya. Mathare natives occasionally feared greening efforts were a cover for illegal land grabbing. As a social intervention, Kairos developed the "Jungle Bicycle" a three-wheeled mobile garden ridden by artists dressed in custom superhero costumes to distribute plants.

During the COVID-19 pandemic, Kairos work shifted to the coastal island of Lamu. Inspired by the island’s distinct cultural preservation and lack of motor vehicles, the team constructed large-scale, futuristic pod structures woven from local palm fibers. This culminated in the Lamu Space Station, a speculative science-fiction narrative that subverted mainstream, high-tech space-exploration tropes. Instead of promoting space colonization, the project challenged communities to use local materials and imagination to "future" and restore their immediate ecosystems.

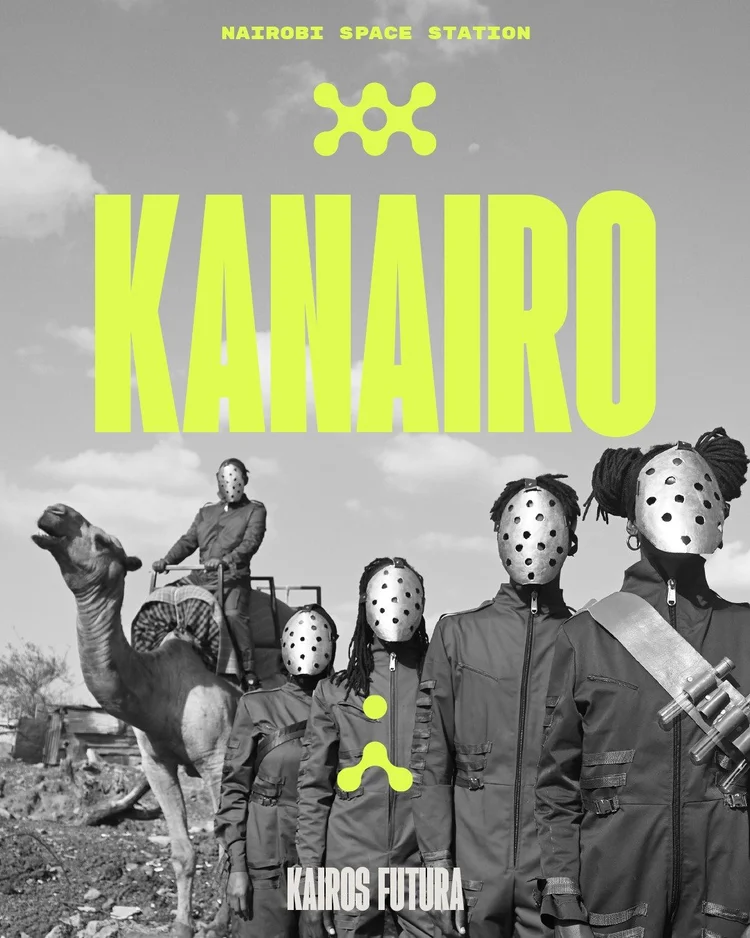
Nairobi Space Station

In 2022, the collective launched the Nairobi Space Station, extending their speculative science-fiction framework to Kenya's capital. It operated under a decentralized model across multiple neighbourhoods to bridge the socioeconomic divide. In 2023, the collective hosted an exhibition, Hakuna Utopia? (a play on the Swahili word "Hakuna" and "Utopia", meaning "There is no Utopia") addressing urban environmental collapse and climate anxiety. By issuing physical "Utopia Maps" and "Utopia Passports", visitors could travel to these designated micro-utopias, participate in community volunteer projects, and receive unique stamped inks in their passports from local "Utopia Agents".

== Ongoing projects ==
- 2026: The Great Repair: umunyu
- 2026: Chyulu Imagination Station in Kibwezi
- 2026: Faces and Masks Exhibition in Nairobi
