= Illegal (cocktail) =

Type of cocktail

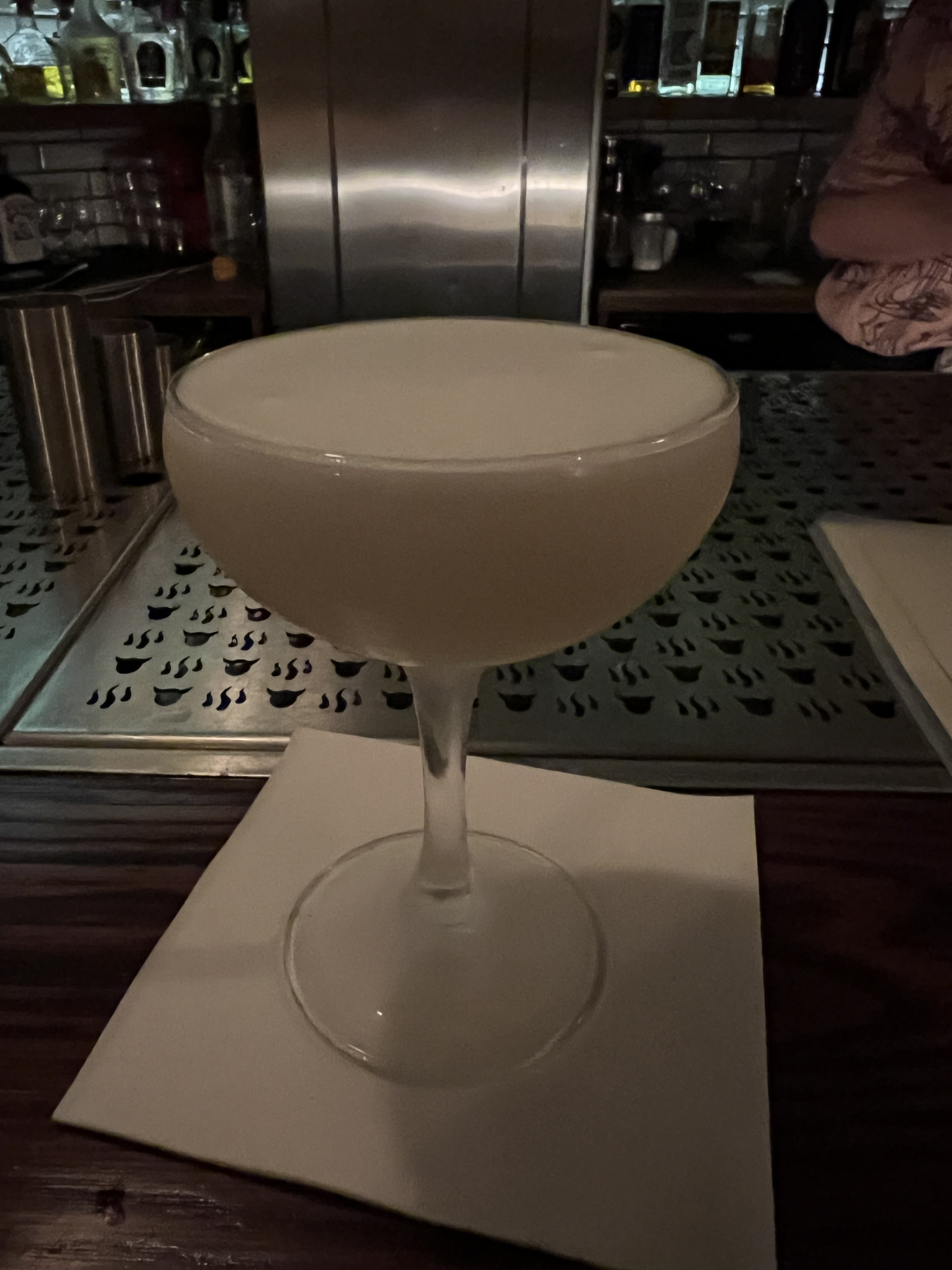
- Illegal at Satan's Whiskers in London
- Type: Cocktail
- Ingredients: 3 cl Mezcal (espadín); 1.5 cl Jamaica overproof white rum; 1.5 cl Falernum; 1 barspoon maraschino Luxardo; 2.25 cl fresh lime juice; 1.5 cl simple syrup; Few drops of egg white (optional)
- Base spirit: Mezcal
- Standard drinkware: Cocktail glass
- Served: Served in one of two ways: Straight up (no ice) in a chilled cocktail glass; On the rocks (over ice) in a traditional clay or terracotta mug
- Preparation: Pour all ingredients into shaker with ice cubes. Shake vigorously. Strain into chilled cocktail glass, or "on the rocks" into a traditional clay or terracotta mug.

The Illegal is an IBA official cocktail. This cocktail is named after the mezcal brand Ilegal Mezcal, which is one of its key ingredients. Mezcal is a type of Mexican distilled spirit made from agave plants, similar to tequila but with a distinct smoky flavor. It is prepared by pouring Mezcal, Jamaican White Rum, Falernum, Maraschino Luxardo, Lime Juice, Simple Syrup, and, optionally, egg white, into a shaker, before shaking the mixture vigorously and serving in a chilled cocktail glass. traditionally, the drink may also be served on the rocks in a clay or terracotta mug.

== History ==
Italian bartender Samuele Ambrosi invented the Illegal sometime in the late 1990s while working as a barman at the Castel Brando hotel in Cison di Valmarino after an American patron, Dr. Joe Paul Shafer, shared his enjoyment of both Daiquiris and the Central and Southern American countries he frequented for work. Inspired, Ambrosi created a Daiquiri variant featuring tequila, falernum, Jamaican rum, maraschino, lime, and simple syrup, which the American patron remarked tasted "so good it must be Illegal", with said explanation birthing the idea of the name. Ambrosi would tinker with the recipe at the Dom’us in Oderzo, replacing the tequila for Mezcal, eventually evolving into the cocktail known today. The Illegal was formally added to the IBA official cocktail list in 2020 with the modern recipe.

== See also ==
- List of IBA official cocktails
