= Cocuy =

Venezuelan liquor

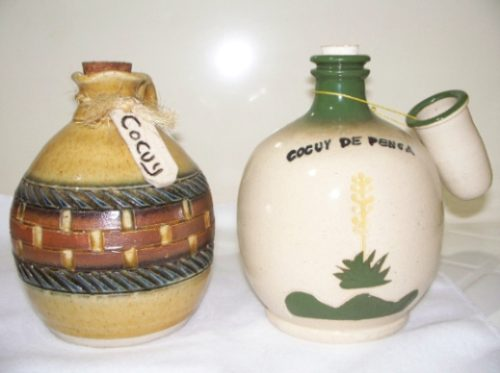
Traditional Cocuy

Cocuy (Spanish: [koˈkuj]) is a liquor distilled from the fermented juices of the head, body or leaves of agave.

In Venezuela, Agave cocui ("green agave") is used to artisanally produce the drink in Falcón and Lara. With a taste similar to other agave-based liquors such as tequila and mezcal, it is known as the Tequila of Venezuela. Long considered a cheap rural drink (cf. moonshine), since the 2013 collapse of the Venezuelan economy its popularity has boomed compared to more expensive imported competitors. The liquor has become popular even in Caracas, with trendy bars serving cocuy-based cocktails. Both the plant and their products have been declared by the government as part of the cultural and natural heritage of Falcón and Lara, and the cultural and ancestral heritage of Venezuela as a whole.

In Aruba, Cucui or Coecoei is a liqueur of indigenous Indian origin traditionally made with agave sisalana (kukwisa) and other ingredients. The drink has a light anise flavor and a distinctive red color. Other ingredients include rum and cane sugar. According to tradition, cucui is served at parties, weddings, Christmas, and dande celebrations. It can be enjoyed neat or with ice and is popular among women. Since the rise of the tourism industry in Aruba, cucui is also used as an ingredient in desserts and cocktails, such as the well-known Aruba Ariba cocktail.

== History ==
=== Venezuela ===
Already in pre-Columbian times, in the semi-arid Central-Western Venezuela, the Cocuy plant was known as life and food for aboriginal tribes Aymanes, Xaguas and Jiraharas. The plant is used as raw material for the drink of the same name. cocuy de penca. The Cocuy Liquor manufactured in the Pecaya Parish, Sucre Municipality of the Falcón State is formally known as "Cocuy Pecayero" by the "Autonomous Service of Intellectual Property (SAPI) in May 2002.

Despite being a cultural heritage, this activity was classified as unlawful by an unexpected change in the law in 1974, subjecting artisans to persecution. As a consequence 'aguardiente de cocuy' (roughly translated as cocuy spirits) -a combination of neutral alcohol and artisanal cocuy not exceeding 42GL° - was the only form of Cocuy liquor legal to be sold; being strictly supervised by the government. However, in 2005 the law changed, and after being ratified in 2007, Cocuy solely made from Agave was made legal again and many artisanal producers have entered the market competing with the already existing industrial Cocuy Brands (e.g., Cocuy Jirajara, Cocuy Na'guará, Cocuy Lara, et al.)

Finally, on 4 December 2013, eight artisans were awarded their final permits to produce Cocuy in Pecaya. Today Venezuela has 8 brands and duly authenticated, and is expected that during 2014 the rest of the artisans can get their permits.

=== Aruba ===
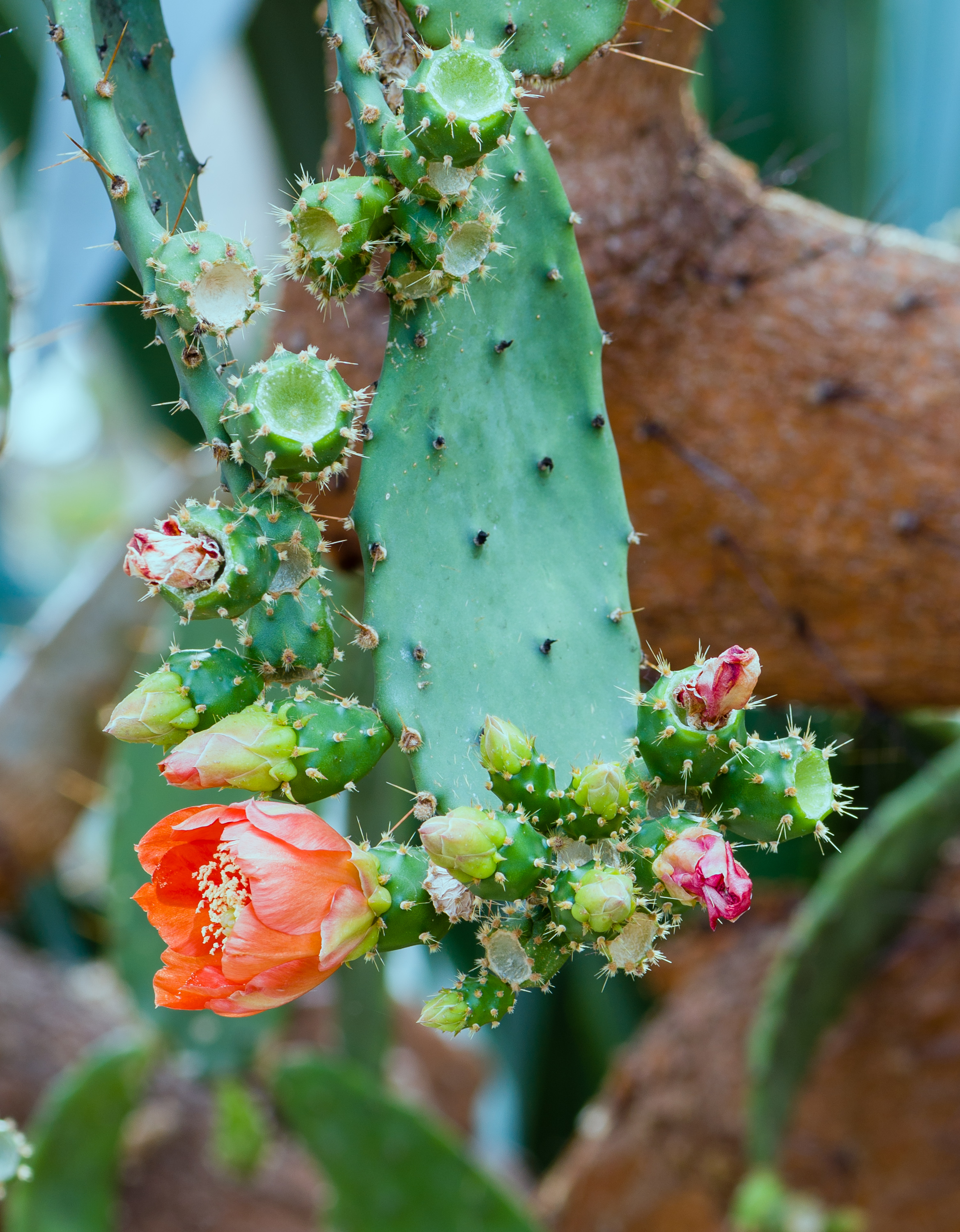
Flowering Opuntia elatior

Cucui originated from an ancient recipe, which was first created by indigenous tribes. The traditional preparation method of cucui involves roasting the leaves of the agave sisalana in underground ovens and fermenting them in pure white rum. To achieve the cherry-red color, the fruit of the tuna (opuntia elatior) is added.

== Manufacturing ==
=== Venezuela ===
- The Cocuy is made by hand, from the stalk, head or piña obtained after removal of the Agave cocui leaves, this is usually baked in artisan ovens at ground level, they coated the walls and bottom with river stones, on which they pile the heads or pads, which are completely covered with leaves removed. The leaves are cooked over low heat with wood. After three to four days in the oven, the leaves are removed and macerated using a wooden bucket and mace. The leaves are then pressed to extract the juice which is subjected to a fermentation process and subsequent distillation. (Standard-Cocuy Pecayero Covenin 3662).
- The distillation is done today in stills craft consisting of a Saucepan, a rectifier and copper coil; I al alembic emulating introduced during the Spanish colonization. During distillation is obtained a clear drink with a very characteristic aroma and bouquet, with high alcohol content (50 degrees), equivalent to tequila and mezcal produced in Mexico with similar plants.
- The first liquid obtained by distillation is called head or pringote. Due to its high alcohol content, the liquid is not suitable for consumption, hence, it is only used as a disinfectant. The fluid obtained through further distillation is called "body or heart" having an alcohol content between 35 and 70 degrees. The third and last part is called "tail" with an alcohol content ranging from 10 to 35 degrees and, as a result, mixes well with other fluids or drinks.
- Cocuy can be aged in oak barrels giving the spirit a much distinct flavour.

=== Aruba ===
After the homemade native drink had fallen into oblivion, cucui regained popularity in the late 1950s. This revival was thanks to tourism and the establishment of commercial bottling and refining companies, including firms such as Jan C. Laclé in Santa Cruz, E.F. Debrot Inc., and Playa Liquor & Bottling Co.
