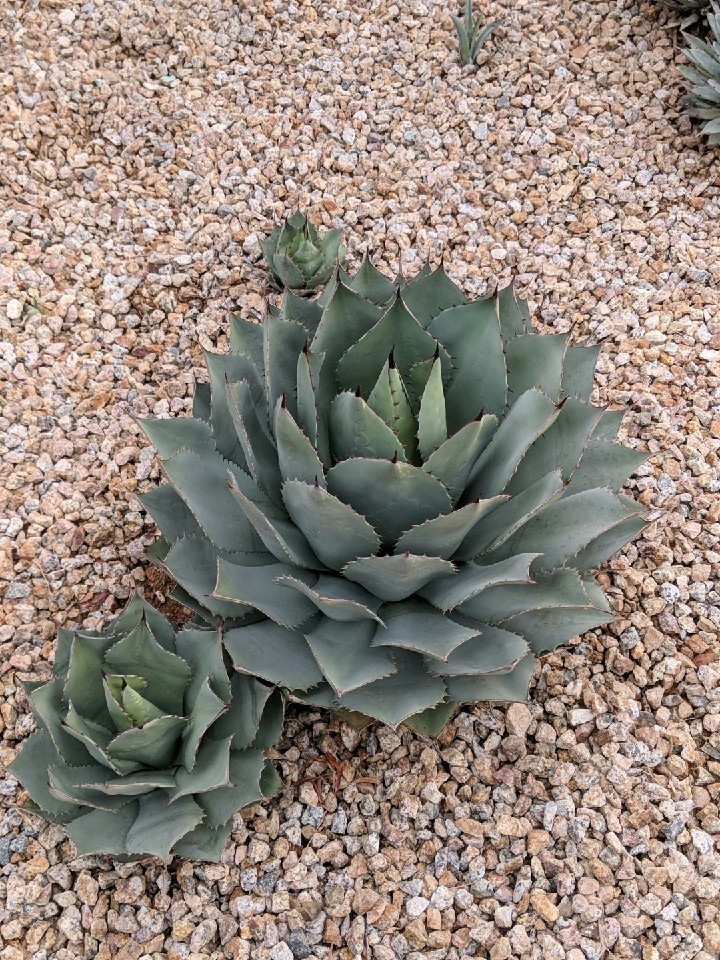

Conservation status
- Vulnerable (IUCN 3.1)

Scientific classification
- Kingdom: Plantae
- Clade: Tracheophytes
- Clade: Angiosperms
- Clade: Monocots
- Order: Asparagales
- Family: Asparagaceae
- Subfamily: Agavoideae
- Genus: Agave
- Species: A. potatorum

Binomial name
- Agave potatorum Zucc.

Synonyms
- Agave amoena Lem. ex Jacobi; Agave auricantha Baker; Agave elegans Salm-Dyck; Agave latifolia Karw. ex Salm-Dyck; Agave pulchra Salm-Dyck; Agave quadrata Lem.; Agave saundersii Hook.f.; Agave schnittspahnii Jacobi; Agave scolymus Karw. ex Salm-Dyck; Agave verschaffeltii Lem. ex Jacobi; Agave verschaffeltii Lem.

= Agave potatorum =

Species of flowering plant

Agave potatorum, the Verschaffelt agave, is a species of flowering plant in the family Asparagaceae. A smallish and attractive succulent perennial, it is native to partial desert areas of Mexico from Puebla south to Oaxaca.

The Latin specific epithet potatorum refers to drinking and brewing. In its range, it is used extensively to make mezcal, and for this reason, it is considered to be a threatened species.

This plant has gained the Royal Horticultural Society's Award of Garden Merit.

== Description ==
Agave potatorum grows as a basal rosette of between 30 and 80 flat spatulate leaves of up to 1 foot in length and edge fringe of short, sharp, dark spines and ending in a needle of up to 1.6 inches long. The leaves are pale, silvery white, with the flesh coloured green fading lilac to pink at the tips. The flower spike can be 10–20 feet long when fully developed and bears pale green and yellow flowers.
