= Aruba Ariba =

Cocktail

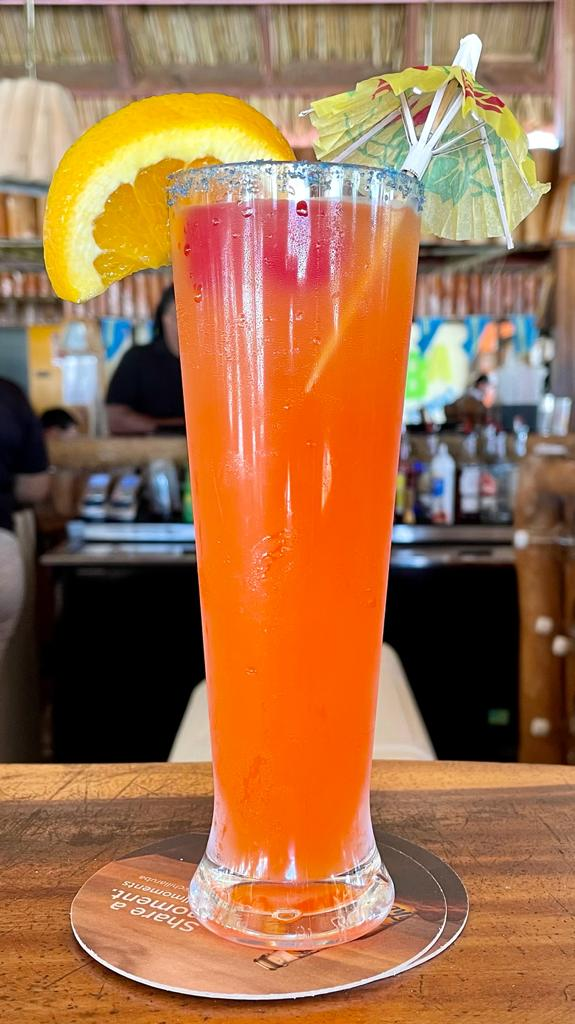
Aruba Ariba cocktail

An Aruba Ariba is a cocktail originating in Aruba and is considered the Aruban variant of the Caribbean rum punch. The cocktail holds the title of the most popular mixed drink in the Aruban tourist industry.

== Origin ==
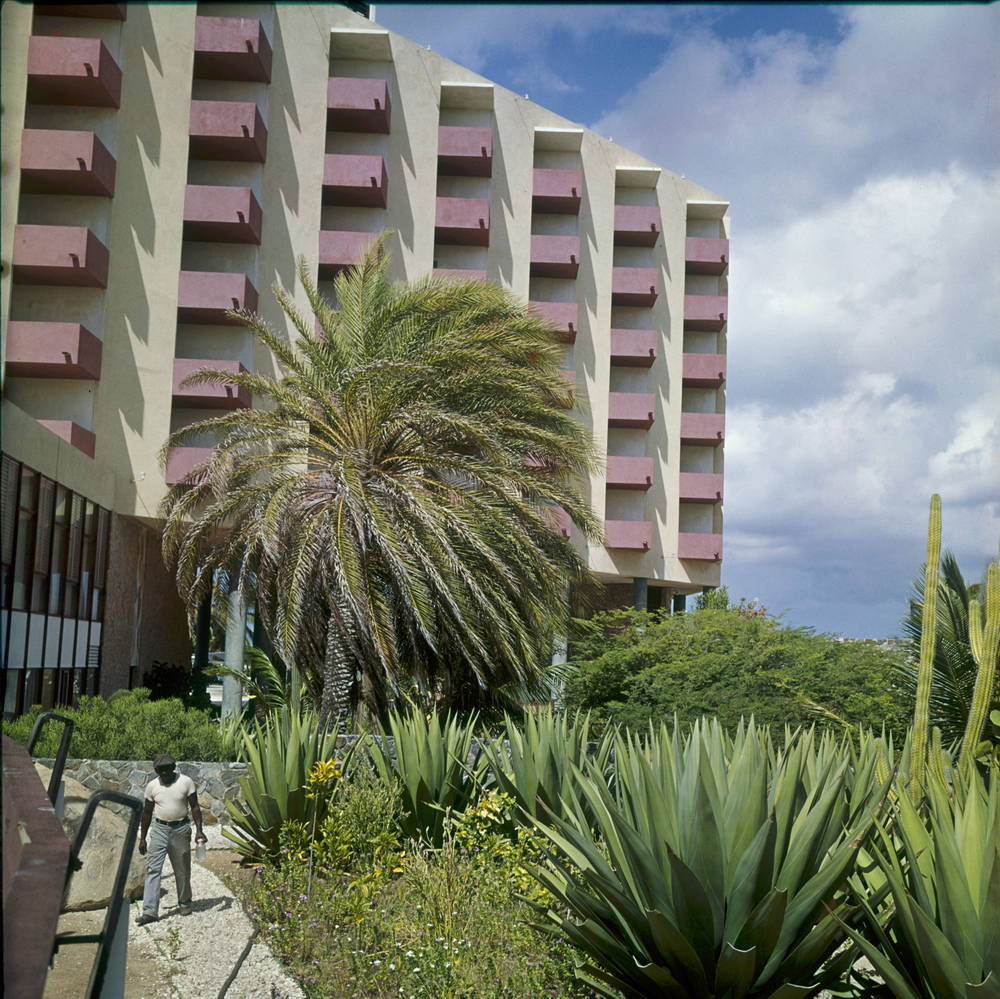
Aruba Caribbean Hotel (1964)

The Aruba Ariba cocktail drink was created on July 1, 1963, at the Aruba Caribbean Hotel. During a bartender competition, the 24-year-old Juan (Jocky) Tromp, the bar manager of the hotel, emerged as the winner with his creation, Aruba Ariba. It's prepared with vodka, rum, crème de banane, and cucui, complemented by a mixture of fruit juices, including pineapple juice, orange juice, lemon juice, and grenadine. In a drinking glass, these ingredients are mixed with crushed ice, lightly stirred, and topped with a maraschino cherry and optionally an orange slice. The cocktail is refreshing and invigorating with a higher alcohol concentration than average. Grand Marnier can be used as a substitute for cucui.

Annually, on July 1, the invention is celebrated at this hotel, which has been operating under the name Hilton Aruba Caribbean Resort & Casino since 2015.
