= Añejo (disambiguation) =

Añejo, Spanish for "aged" (generally in reference to drink or food), may refer to:

== Food and drink ==
- Añejo (tequila), an aging designation of tequila
- Añejo (rum), a type of rum
- Añejo (wine), an aging designation of wine
- Añejo (cheese), a type of cheese
- Añejo, can be applied to aged beef at the butchery counter
