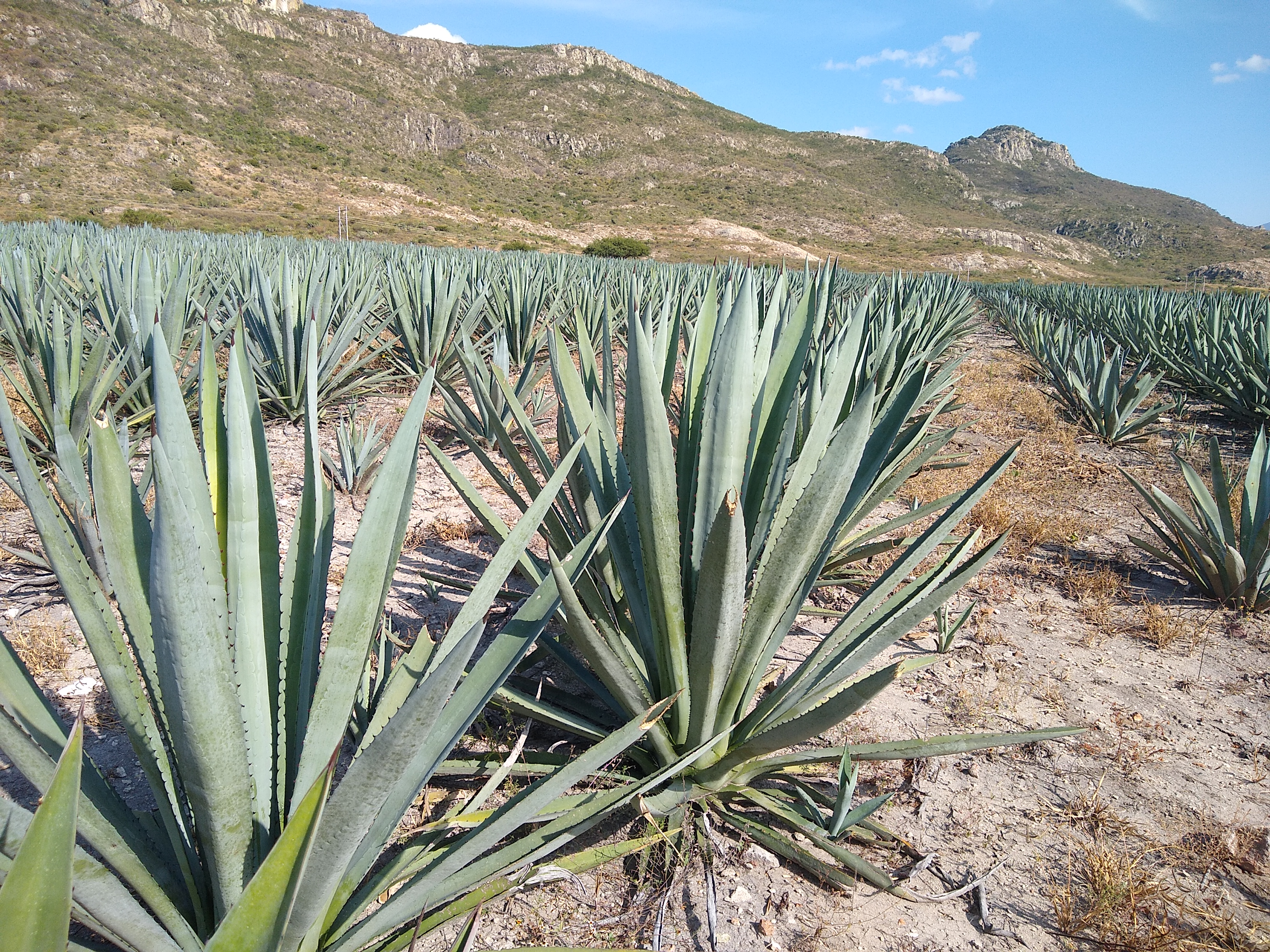
- A. angustifolia plants being cultivated in Oaxaca, Mexico

Conservation status
- Least Concern (IUCN 3.1)

Scientific classification
- Kingdom: Plantae
- Clade: Tracheophytes
- Clade: Angiosperms
- Clade: Monocots
- Order: Asparagales
- Family: Asparagaceae
- Subfamily: Agavoideae
- Genus: Agave
- Species: A. angustifolia

Binomial name
- Agave angustifolia Haw.

= Agave angustifolia =

Species of flowering plant

Agave angustifolia (Caribbean agave) is a species of agave plant which is native to Mexico and Central America. It is used to make mezcal and also as an ornamental plant. The cultivar 'Marginata' that white margins on the leaves is a popular variety cultivated in botanical gardens and backyards. It is very closely related to blue agave Agave tequilana, but is used to make the distilled alcoholic beverage mezcal instead of tequila, and is the predominant agave species grown in the Mexican state of Oaxaca.

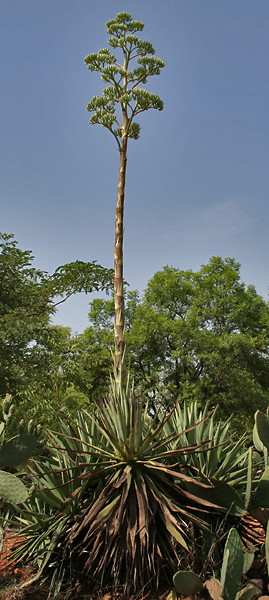
with inflorescence in Hyderabad, India

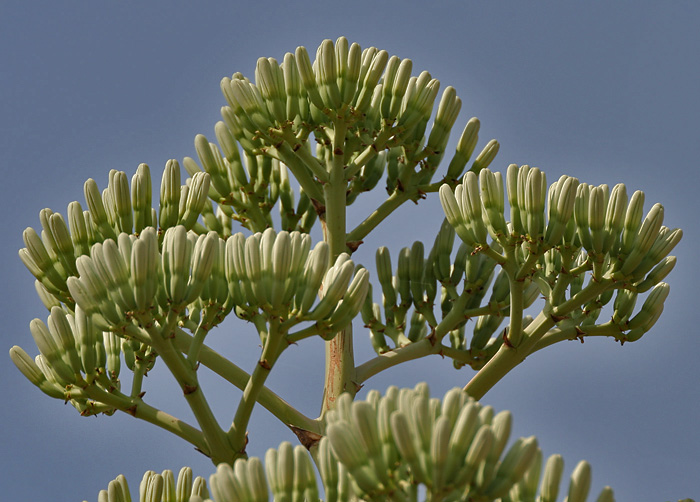
inflorescence- close up in Hyderabad, India

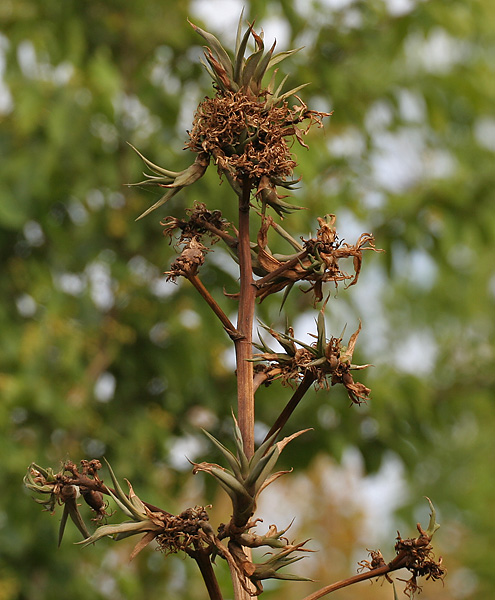
in Hyderabad, India

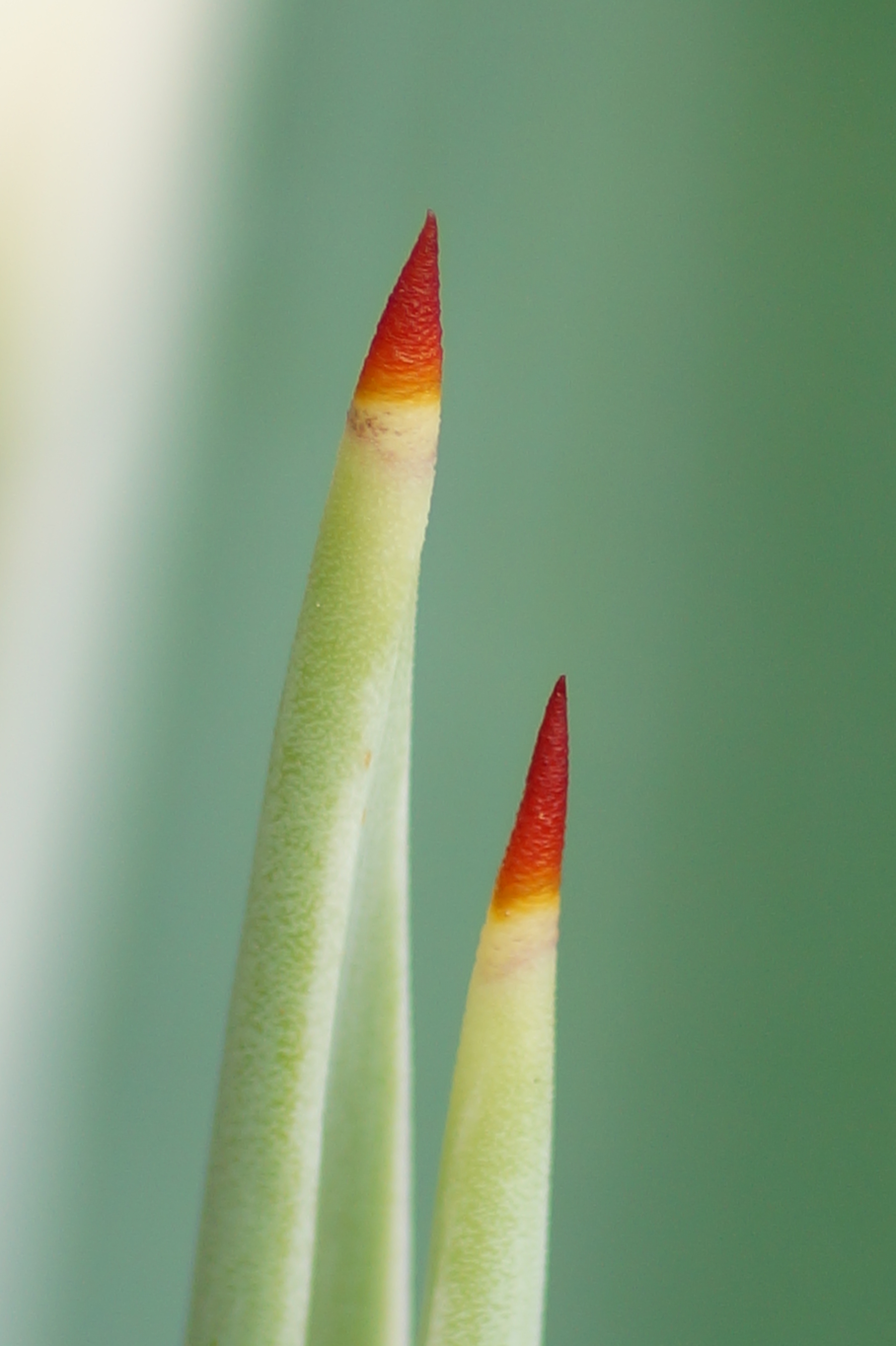
thorn of Caribbean agave at early stages
