= Mezcal =

Distilled alcoholic beverage from Mexico

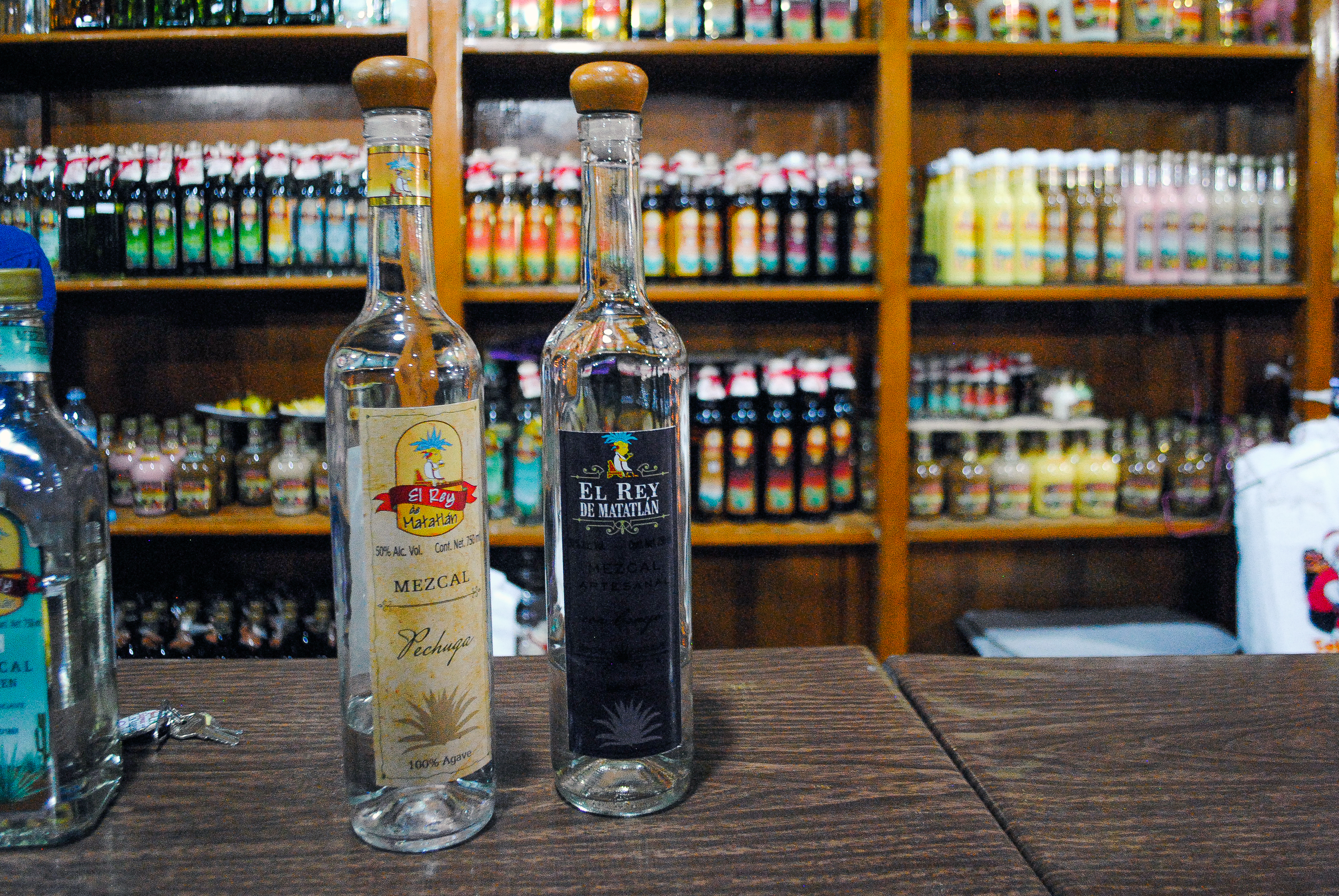
- Bottles at a factory in Teotitlán del Valle, Oaxaca
- Type: Distilled beverage
- Origin: Mexico
- Introduced: 17th century
- Alcohol by volume: 40–55%
- Proof (US): 80–110°
- Color: Clear or golden
- Flavor: Sweet, fruity, earthy, smoky
- Ingredients: agave
- Related products: tequila, bacanora, raicilla, pulque

Mezcal (/mɛˈskæl/, Latin American Spanish: [mesˈkal]), sometimes spelled mescal, is a distilled alcoholic beverage made from any type of agave.

Agaves or magueys are endemic to the Americas and found globally as ornamental plants. The Agave genus is a member of the Agavoideae subfamily of the Asparagaceae plant family which has almost 200 species. Mezcal is made from over thirty separate Agave species, varieties, and subvarieties.

Native fermented drinks from agave plants, such as pulque, existed before the arrival of the Spanish. Mezcal is made from the heart of the agave plant, called the piña.

The most widely consumed form of mezcal is tequila, which is made only with blue agave.

Some 90% of Mexican mezcal comes from Oaxaca. In Mexico, mezcal is generally consumed straight and has a strong smoky flavor. Mexico increasingly exports the product, mostly to Japan and the United States.

Despite the similar name, mezcal does not contain mescaline or other psychedelic substances.

== Etymology ==
The word mezcal comes from Nahuatl mexcalli [meʃˈkalːi], which means "baked agave", from metl [met͡ɬ] "agave" and ixca [iʃˈka] "to bake". It is sometimes spelled mescal.

== History ==
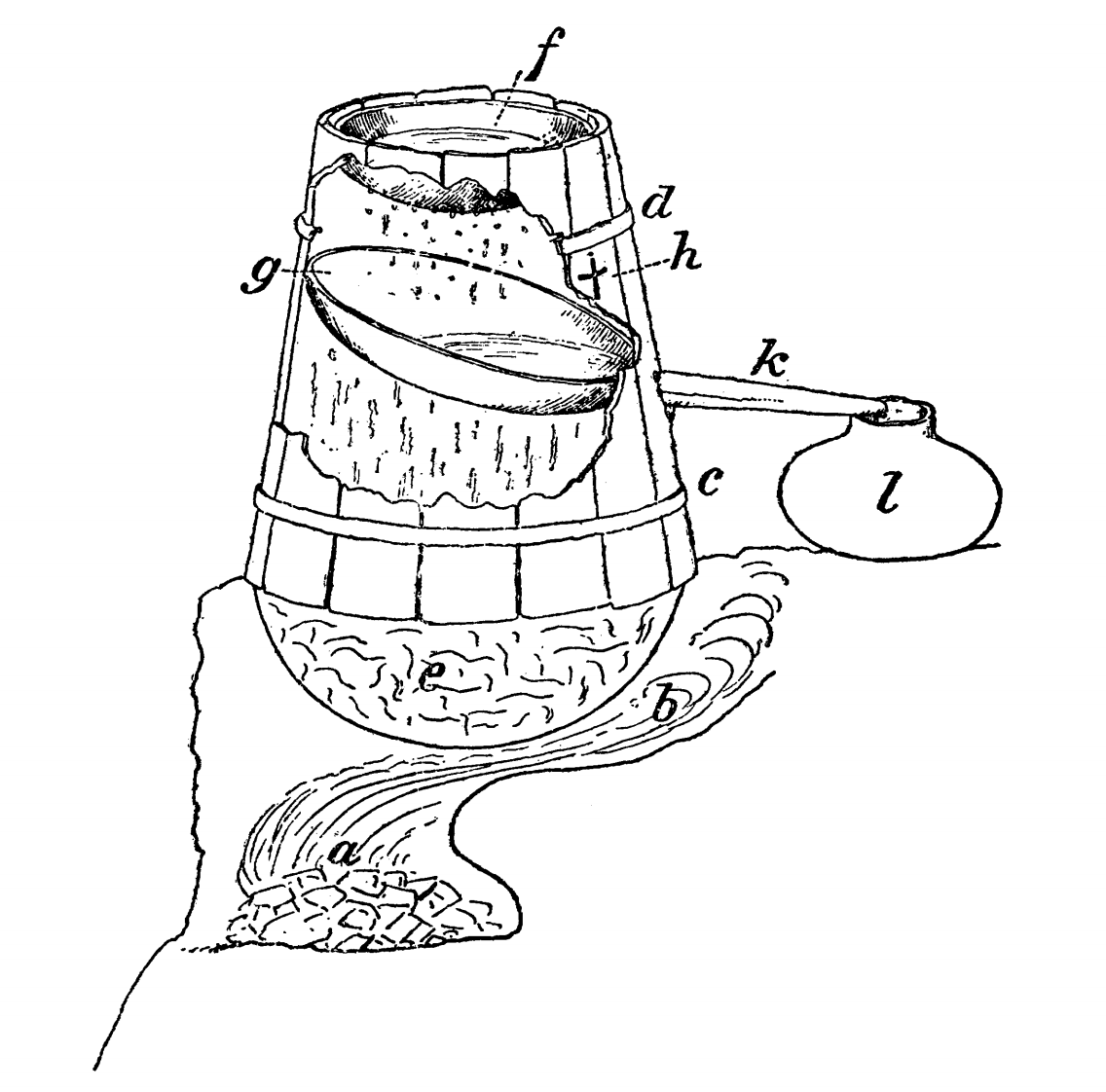
A "Tarascan still", a modified Filipino-type still with bound wooden staves as the boiling chamber. It was used by the Purépecha people for distilling mezcal (c. 1893).

Pulque (a fermented drink from agave sap) is pre-colonial, but the distillation of fermented agave heart juice into mezcal was introduced only in the colonial era when Filipino sailors and migrants brought the technology of Filipino-type stills with them during the galleon trade between Mexico and the Philippines (1565 to 1815). This is supported by ethnohistoric, botanical, archaeological, and toponymic evidence. Mezcal is the product of the merging of pre-Columbian indigenous fermentation traditions and Asian distillation techniques brought over from the Philippines.

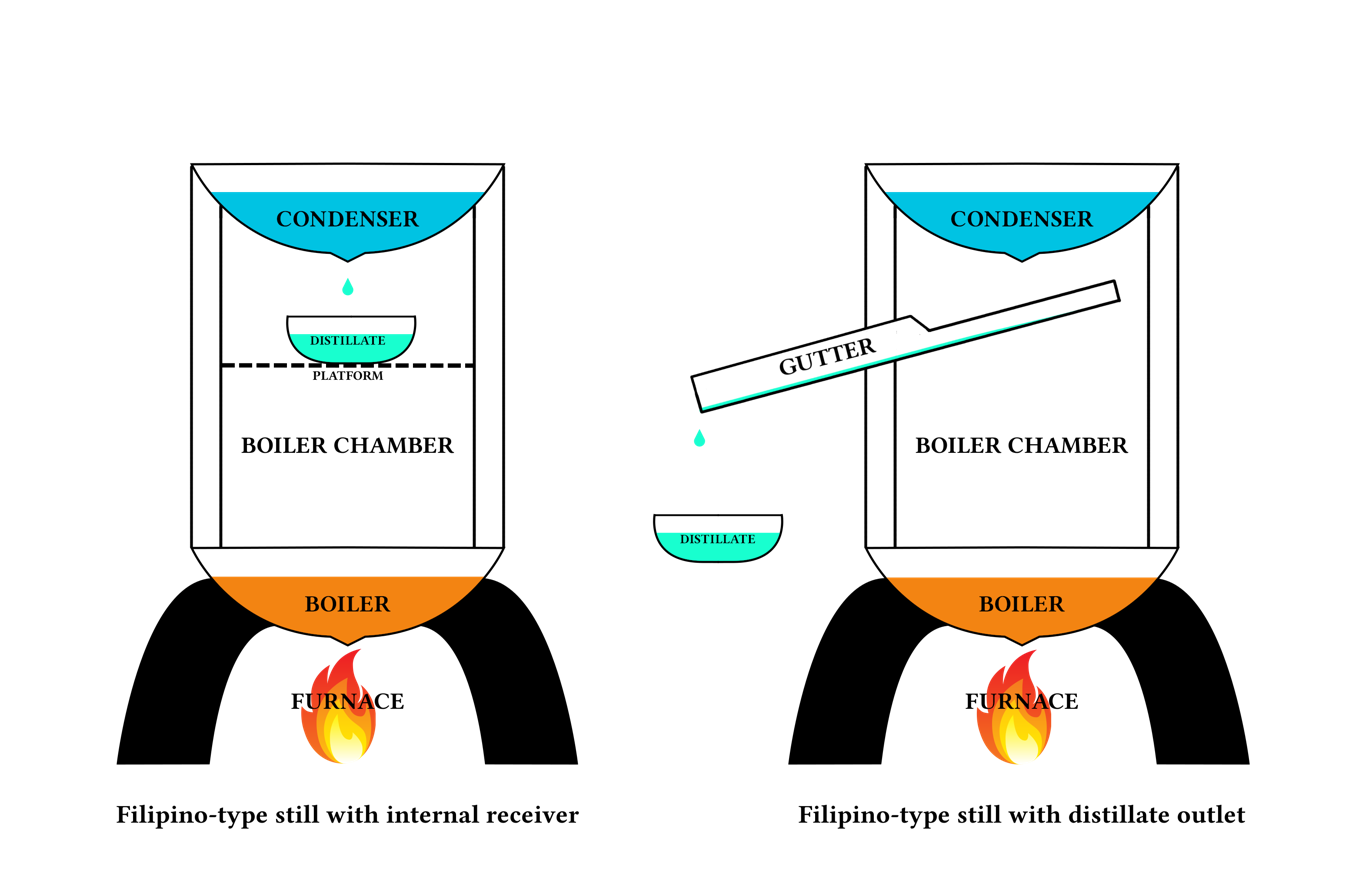
Generalized diagrams of the two main variations of Filipino-type stills

Filipino-type stills, derived from Mongolian and East Asian stills, are very distinct from the more complex European-type alembic stills (derived from Arabic and Middle Eastern stills). They were cheap and easy to manufacture, though less efficient than alembic-type stills. They were made of a mixture of different easy-to-acquire materials. They usually consist of a hollowed-out log (usually from the parota tree) with two copper or iron pans. These were often substituted with larger capacity earthenware jars and bowls, bound wooden staves, or even metal cylinders. The upper pan is continually filled with cold water and functions as the condenser; while the bottom pan holds the fermented juice over the furnace, functioning as the boiler. The distillate is collected either by an internal container placed in between the two pans on a platform; or a spoon-shaped collector and gutter made from wood, rolled agave leaf, or carrizo cane (originally bamboo in the Philippines) that exits from the hollow log in between the pans to an external clay container. A modified version of this, usually called "olla de barro" (lit. "clay pot"), use a specially-shaped clay vessel (or overlapped clay vessels) built into a furnace as the boiler chamber (doing away with the hollow log and the bottom pan). It only uses one pan (the condenser), but otherwise operates on the same principle. There are also many other modified variants, usually named after the indigenous peoples that use them, including the "Tarascan still" (or "Tarasco still"), "Zapoteco still", "Nahua still", "Bolaños still", and "Huichol still" (the latter used for making sotol, not mezcal). Filipino-type stills are also still referred to by mezcal and tequila manufacturers (especially in Jalisco and Michoacán) as the "Filipino still" (destilador Filipino).

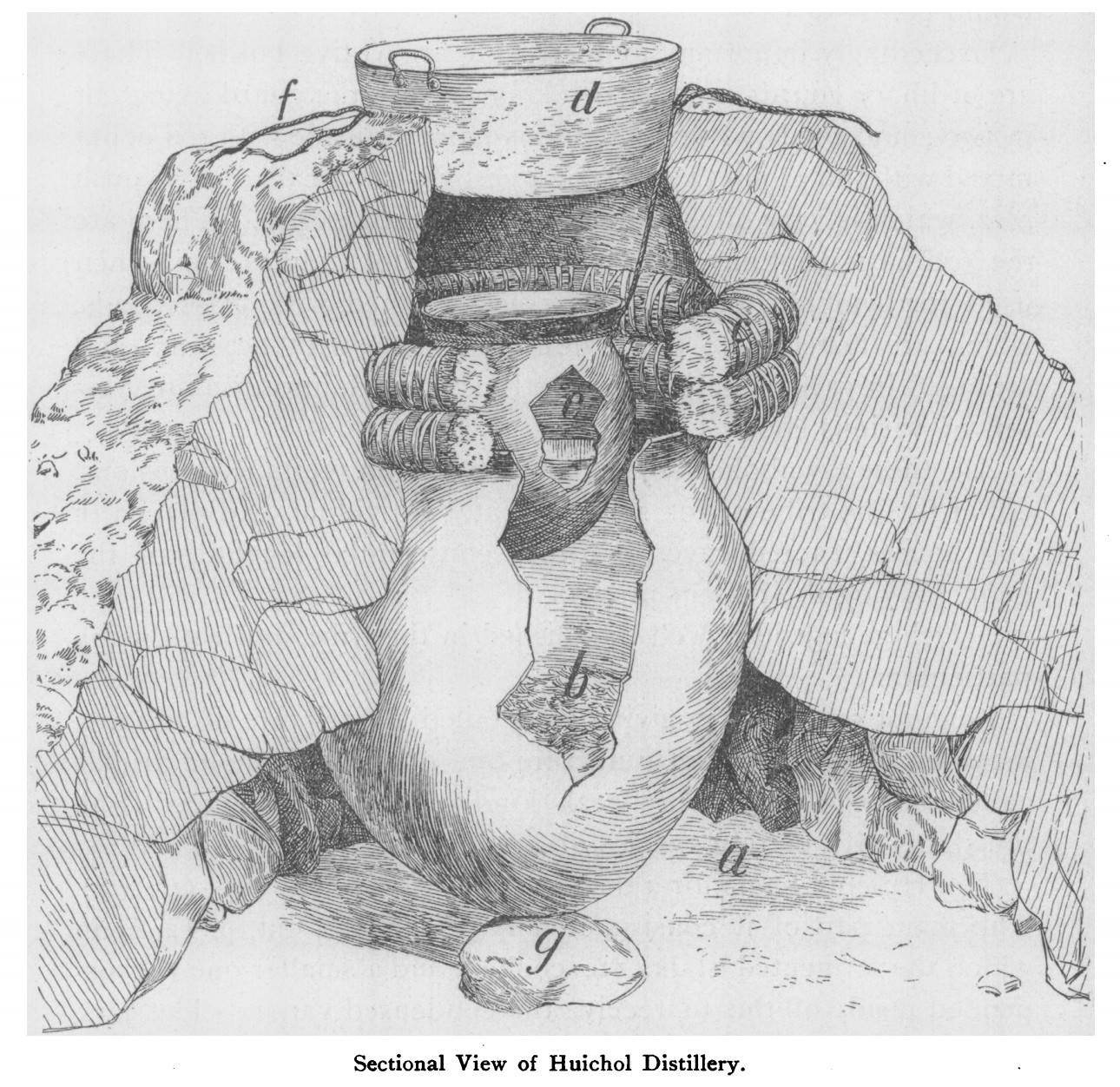
A "Huichol still", a modified Filipino-type still with a suspended internal distillate collector. It was used by the Huichol people for making sotol (c. 1898).

These stills were initially used by Filipino settlers who established coconut plantations on the coastal regions of Guerrero and Colima of New Spain to make vino de coco (coconut liquor, also called lambanog). Over the centuries that the Manila-Acapulco galleon trade was active, an estimated 75,000 Filipinos settled western Mexico and intermarried with indigenous and mixed-race families. They passed the knowledge of these stills to local communities who applied it to distill fermented agave. The first historical record of mezcal production is from southern Jalisco, using techniques derived from coconut liquor production from Colima.

By the early 1600s, the Spanish colonial government and the Real Audiencia in Spain banned vino de coco and issued an order for the destruction of coconut plantations in Colima because it competed with the sales of imported spirits from Spain. This was also the reason they did not initially introduce distillation to Mexico. Although this wasn't complied with completely, the prohibition of vino de coco led to the expansion and commercialization of the production of mezcal to fill the local demand for cheap liquor. The first mention of distilled agave spirits in colonial records is from 1619, by the Spanish cleric Domingo Lázaro de Arregui. He mentions that the indigenous peoples in the coastal regions of the Sierra de Nayarit were distilling "mexcales", which he describes as being obtained by distilling fermented juice from roasted agave leaf bases. By 1638, the governor of Nueva Galicia also started to regulate the sale of mezcal. Mezcal became banned shortly after, though its illicit trade continued. By 1643, there are records of mezcal and vino de coco being sold in Guadalajara.

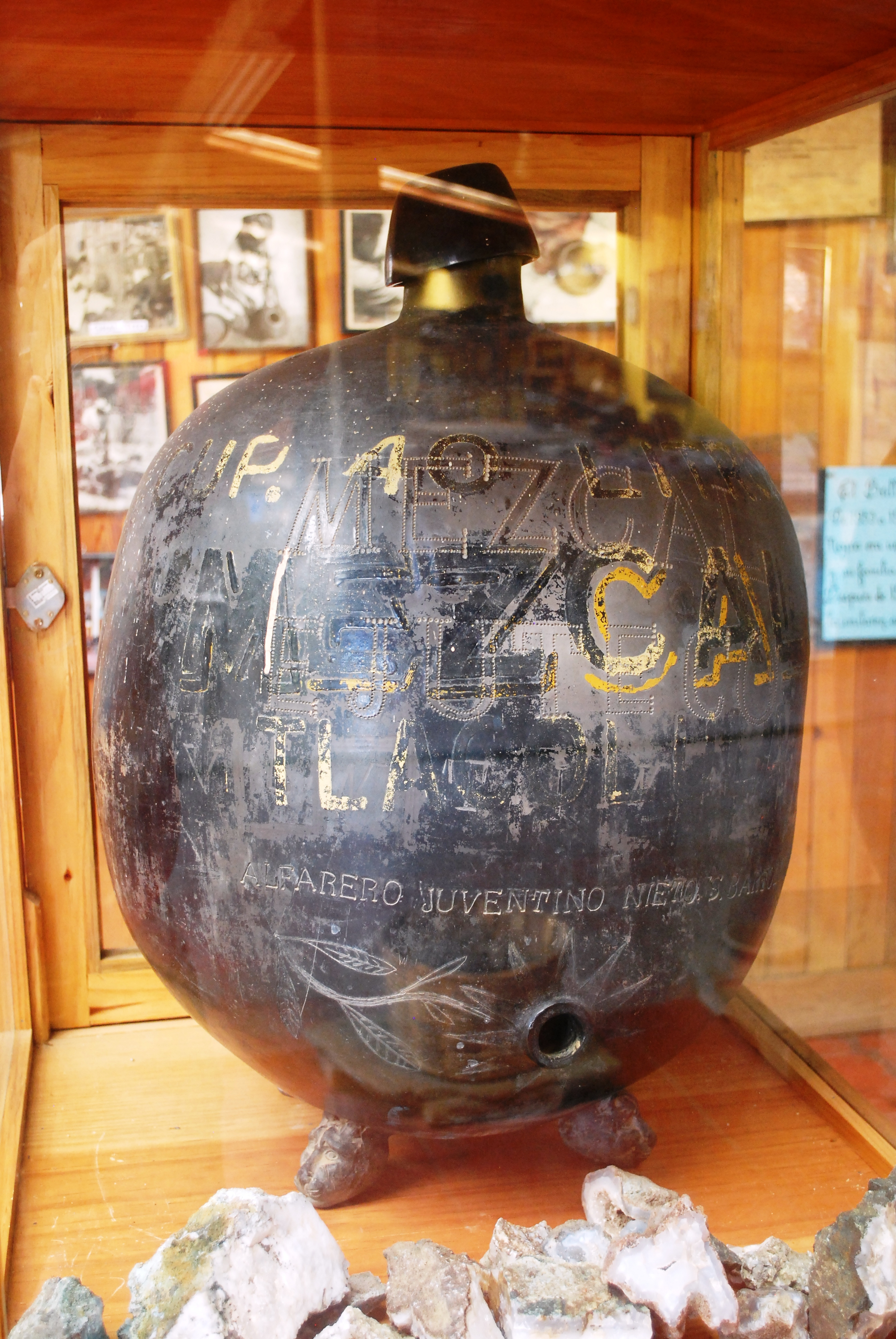
A cantaro jar, made from barro negro pottery, used for serving mezcal

The production of mezcal moved from the coastal river basins of the Río Grande de Santiago to the inland ravines by the early 1700s to evade the prohibition on indigenous spirits production, as well as to take advantage of the larger numbers of wild agave plants in the interiors. The plants used expanded to highland cultivars of Agave angustifolia, as well as Agave rhodacantha in Jalisco, and Agave hookeri in Michoacán.

By the mid-1700s, the production of vino de coco had ceased completely due to the prohibition and the loss of coconut plantations. But mezcal liquor survived because they were sourced from abundant wild agaves which the Spanish could not eradicate. The production sites moved to even more remote and difficult-to-access areas in the foothills of the Volcán de Colima, the ravines of the Colima Valley, and in the Chamila Valley. During this period, the first clandestine distilleries in the highlands of Jalisco were also established in the valleys of Amatitán, Tequila, Magdalena, and El Arenal, whose mezcal variant made specifically from blue agave later became tequila.

The small size of the Filipino-type stills made it easy to disassemble and move while evading colonial authorities. The numerous well-like ancient graves cut into the rocks in the region were also coopted as fermentation basins for agave juice. The small size of the still also allowed distillers to produce agave liquor from a very small number of agave plants or even a single plant. These conditions led to the constant selection and vegetative propagation of wild agave plants with the best characteristics for agave liquor production, eventually resulting in the development of domesticated cultivars of agave.

In Colima, the fermented agave to be distilled into mezcal is still called tuba (a synonym of mosto), the term adopted from the tubâ used to ferment vino de coco. The term tuba is also used for fermented sotol plant (genus Dasylirion) core juice, before its distillation into sotol liquor by the Huichol people, also indicative of its origins as an adaptation of vino de coco production.

The oldest agave spirits distilleries (called tabernas or viñatas) use Filipino-type stills, many of which are still operational (like the Macario Partida distilleries in Zapotitlán de Vadillo, Jalisco). The technology was also transported through trade routes into Zacatecas, Guanajuato, Michoacán, Sonora, and the rest of Mexico, as well as parts of the southern United States, where modified Filipino-type stills have been reported. The alembic-type still, finally introduced by the Spanish for distilling sugarcane, was later also adopted for mezcal production. Most modern mass-produced mezcals are made using alembic-type stills, but the highest category of certification, the "ancestral mezcal" must be distilled using only Filipino-type stills.

=== Possible pre-colonial distillation ===
Some authors have also proposed the existence of a separate pre-colonial distillation of small quantities of agave for elites, based on an interpretation of the peculiarly-shaped double or triple-chambered Capacha Culture clay vessels as small stills. These vessels are known in Spanish as bules, and date to c.1500 to 1000 BCE. They were hypothesized to have been capped with a condensing cold water-filled bowl, with a very small cup placed inside to collect the distillate. Modern replicas using this method have been successful in producing small quantities of spirits with an alcohol content as high as 35%. If the distillation of mezcal was indeed present in pre-Columbian Mexico, it would mean the introduction of Filipino-type stills merely expanded the production by using new techniques. However, the archaeological evidence for this remains inconclusive, as examination and molecular testing of ancient Capacha bules in 2019 have not detected any of the expected macroscopic botanical remains (like fibers) or chemical biomarkers for agave or any other high-sugar agricultural products (like fruits, cactus juice, honey, or corn) that could be distilled into spirits. Furthermore, all of the vessels are exclusively only found in association with tombs and burial sites (they are absent in utilitarian or industrial sites); they show completely no evidence of ever having been placed over a fire; and no cups or bowls have been recovered in situ in association with them.

== Regulation ==
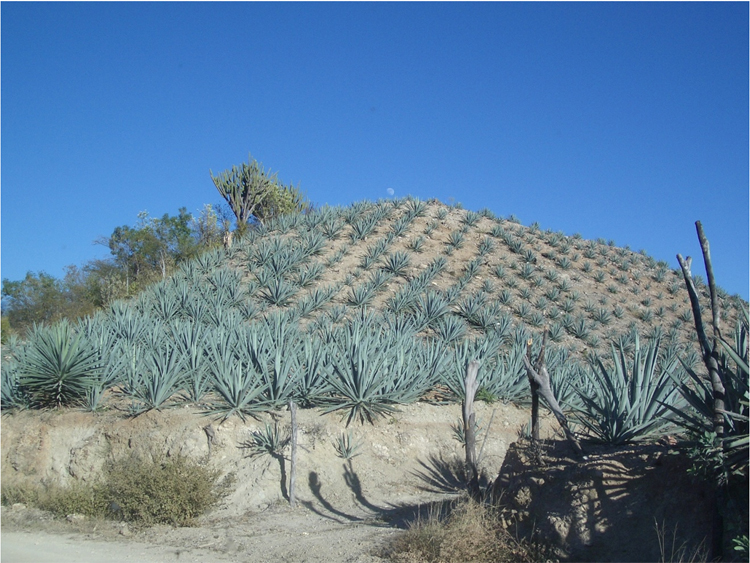
A typical maguey landscape

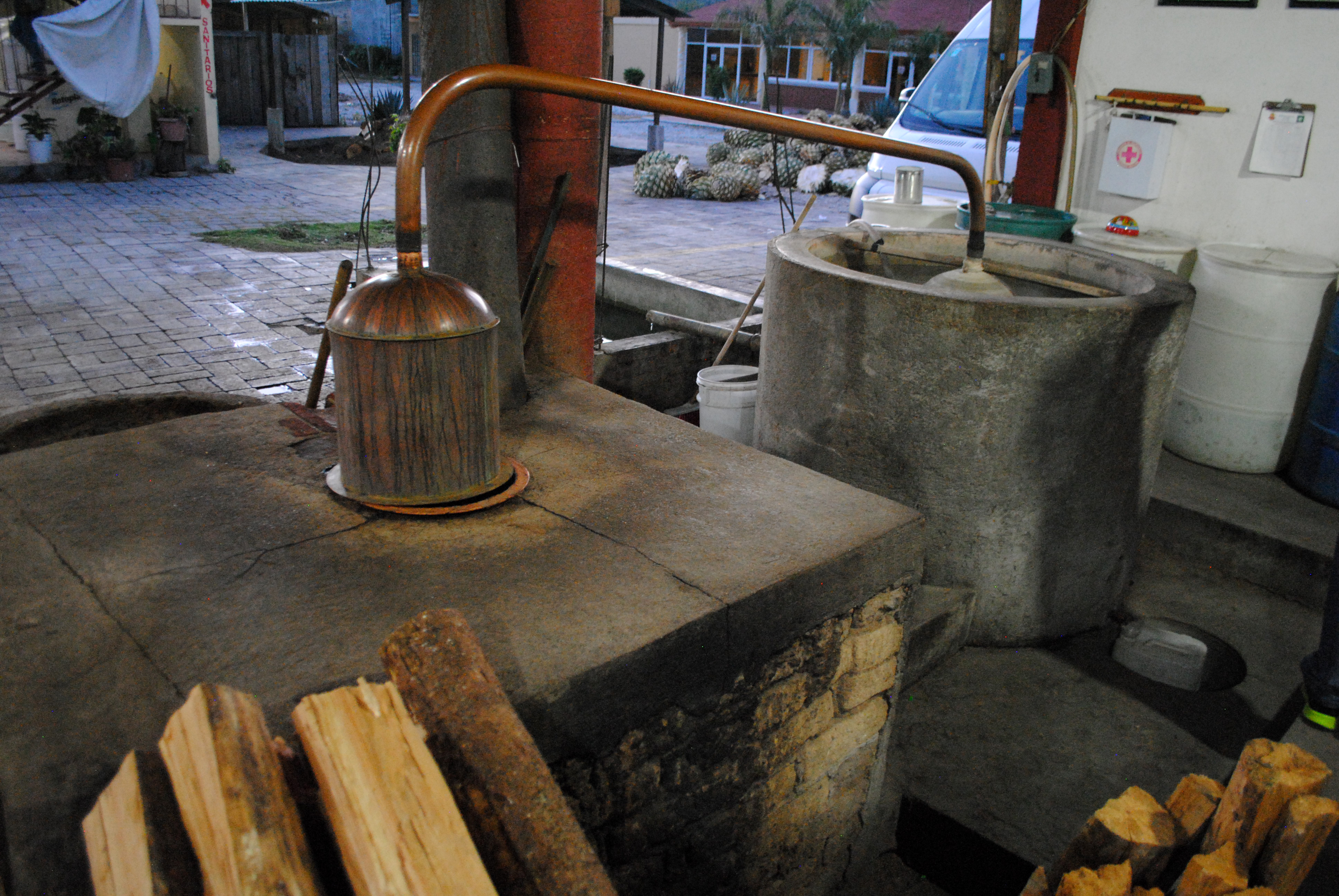
Modern copper alembic-type still used to distill mezcal artesanal

Internationally, mezcal has been recognized as an Appellation of Origin (AO, DO) since 1994. There is also a Geographical Indication (GI), originally limited to the states of Oaxaca, Guerrero, Durango, San Luis Potosí, Puebla and Zacatecas. Similar products are made in Jalisco, Guanajuato, Michoacán, and Tamaulipas, but these have not been included in the mezcal DO.

Traditionally the word "mezcal" has been used generally in Mexico for all agave spirits and it continues to be used for many agave spirits whether these spirits have been legally certified as "mezcal" or not. Within Mexico, mezcal is regulated under Norma Oficial Mexicana (NOM) regulations, originally NOM-070-SCFI-1994 (in 1994), by the industry body Consejo Mexicano Regulador de la Calidad del Mezcal A.C. (COMERCAM, the Mexican Regulatory Council for Mezcal Quality). This regulation became law in 2003, and certification began in 2005.

Modern mezcal is divided into three categories certified by the Norma Oficial Mexicana:

- Mezcal – For mezcal produced with high-efficiency modern production methods and modern equipment like autoclaves, diffusers, and stainless steel or copper column stills. It is sometimes derisively referred to as "industrial mezcal" (mezcal industrial).
- Artisanal mezcal (mezcal artesanal) – For mezcal produced using artisanal stills. Autoclaves, diffusers, and column stills are prohibited. The agave hearts must be cooked in pit hearths or clay/brick ovens. Milling must be done with mallets, stone mills, or mechanical mills. The juice must be fermented in animal skins or pits or tanks made with stone, clay, or wood. The most common types of stills used are the copper or stainless steel alembic-type stills (used by the vast majority), the modified refrescador alembic-type stills with a refrescadera (a cylinder of continuously flowing cold water surrounding the still head), and the Filipino-type stills. Mezcal produced in this way are distilled once, twice, or thrice, depending on the regional tradition, but the most common number of distillations is twice. The vast majority of certified mezcal belong to this category.
- Ancestral mezcal (mezcal ancestral) – For mezcal produced completely by traditional methods. Stainless steel and modern equipment are prohibited. This requires the agave hearts to be pit-cooked and crushed by mallets or stone mills. The juice must be fermented in animal skins or pits or tanks made with stone, clay, or wood. It must only be distilled using Filipino-type stills made of clay or wood.

Artisanal and ancestral mezcal are preferred due to the fact that the use of traditional materials like wood and clay impart and absorb flavors during distillation. Copper is also preferred for the metal parts of the stills as they remove undesirable sulfur flavors during distillation and do not impart flavors of their own to the product. Almost all artisanal and traditional stills use a copper component.

The three categories are further subdivided into six additional classes:

- Blanco ("white") or Joven ("young") – refers to unaged and unadulterated mezcal. Most mezcal belongs to this class.
- Madurado en vidrio ("matured in glass") – refers to mezcal stored in glass for a year or more buried underground or in a location with minimal variation in temperature, light, and humidity. Burying is a traditional method for softening mezcal without reducing alcohol content.
- Reposado ("rested") – refers to mezcal stored in a wooden vessel of any type or size for between 2 months to a year.
- Añejo ("aged") – refers to mezcal stored in a wooden vessel of less than 1,000 L (260 US gal) for more than a year.
- Abocado ("easy to drink") – refers to mezcal that is flavored or infused with other ingredients. NOM specifically permits maguey "worms", damiana, lime, orange, mango, and honey; but other fruits, herbs, and caramel are also commonly added.
- Destilado con ("distilled with") or Mezcales de pechuga ("chicken breast mezcal") – refers to mezcal where the second or third distillation includes other ingredients like fruit, meat (hence the name), or herbs. This process is traditional.

The regulations have been controversial, not only from small artisanal producers for whom the cost of certification is prohibitive, but also from traditional producers outside the chosen GI states and those producers who believe that the term "mezcal" should not be owned by the state. Uncertified producers are prohibited from using the term "mezcal" on their products. Some producers and importers have responded by labeling their products as "destilados de agave" or "agave spirits", a category now recognized by the United States' TTB and in increasing use.

In Canada, products that are labelled, packaged, sold or advertised as mezcal must be manufactured in Mexico as mezcal under the stipulated guidelines. However, Canadian laws also allow for local bottling and resale of imported mezcal, after its alcohol percentage has been adjusted with the addition of distilled or purified water. Uncertified agave spirits labeled as "destilados de agave" or "agave spirits" can also be bottled in the United States.

== Mezcal agave ==
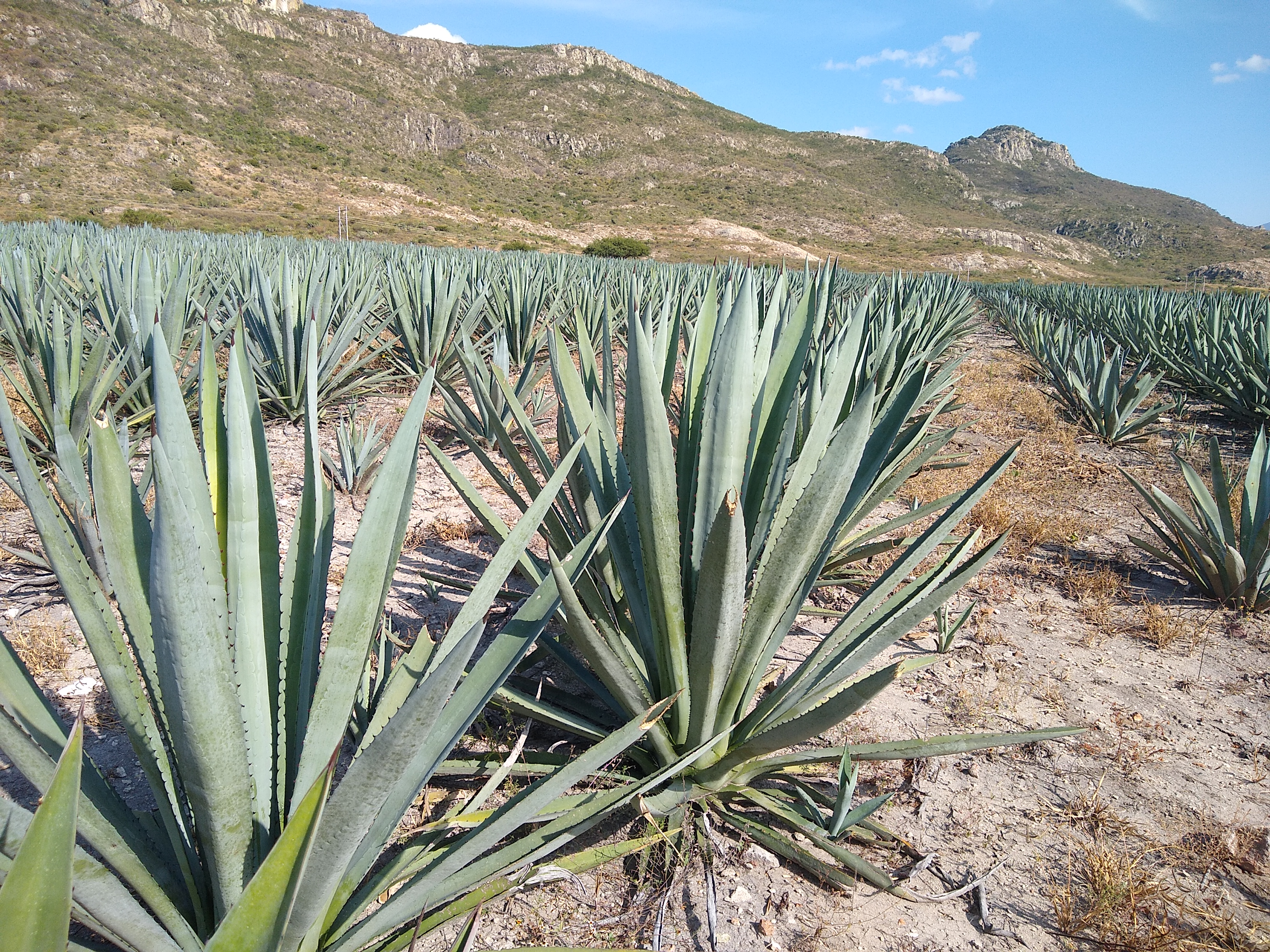
Agave angustifolia (espadín)

The Agave genus is a member of the Agavoideae subfamily of the Asparagaceae plant family (formerly included in the now defunct Agavaceae family) which has almost 200 species. There are more than 120 species of agave. Of the more than 200 species of Agave, roughly 150 are represented in Mexico, about 70% of which are endemic to the country. The mezcal agave has very large, thick leaves with points at the ends. When it is mature, it forms a "piña" or heart in the center from which juice is extracted to convert into mezcal. It takes between seven and fifteen years for the plant to mature, depending on the species and whether it is cultivated or wild. Agave fields are a common sight in the semi-desert areas of Oaxaca state and other parts of Mexico.

=== Varieties ===
Mezcal is made from over 30 agave species, varieties, and subvarieties, in contrast with tequila, which is made only with blue agave. Of many agave species that can be used to make mezcal, seven are particularly notable. There is no exhaustive list, as the regulations allow any agaves, provided that they are not used as the primary material in other governmental Denominations of Origin. The term silvestre "wild" is sometimes found, but simply means that the agaves are wild (foraged, not cultivated); it is not a separate variety.

Most commonly used is espadín "smallsword" (Agave angustifolia (Haw.), var. espadín), the predominant agave in Oaxaca. The next most important are arroqueño (Agave americana (L.) var. oaxacensis, sub-variety arroqueño), cirial (Agave karwinskii (Zucc.)), barril (Agave rodacantha (Zucc.) var. barril), mexicano (Agave macroacantha or Agave rhodacantha var. mexicano, also called dobadaan) (Note: Dobadaan is an old colloquial term for mexicano, popularized by Jonathan Barbeiri, founder of Pierde Almas.) and cincoañero (Agave canatala Roxb). The most famous wild agave is tobalá (Agave potatorum (Zucc.)). Others include madrecuixe, tepeztate, jabalí, and bicuixe.

== Production ==
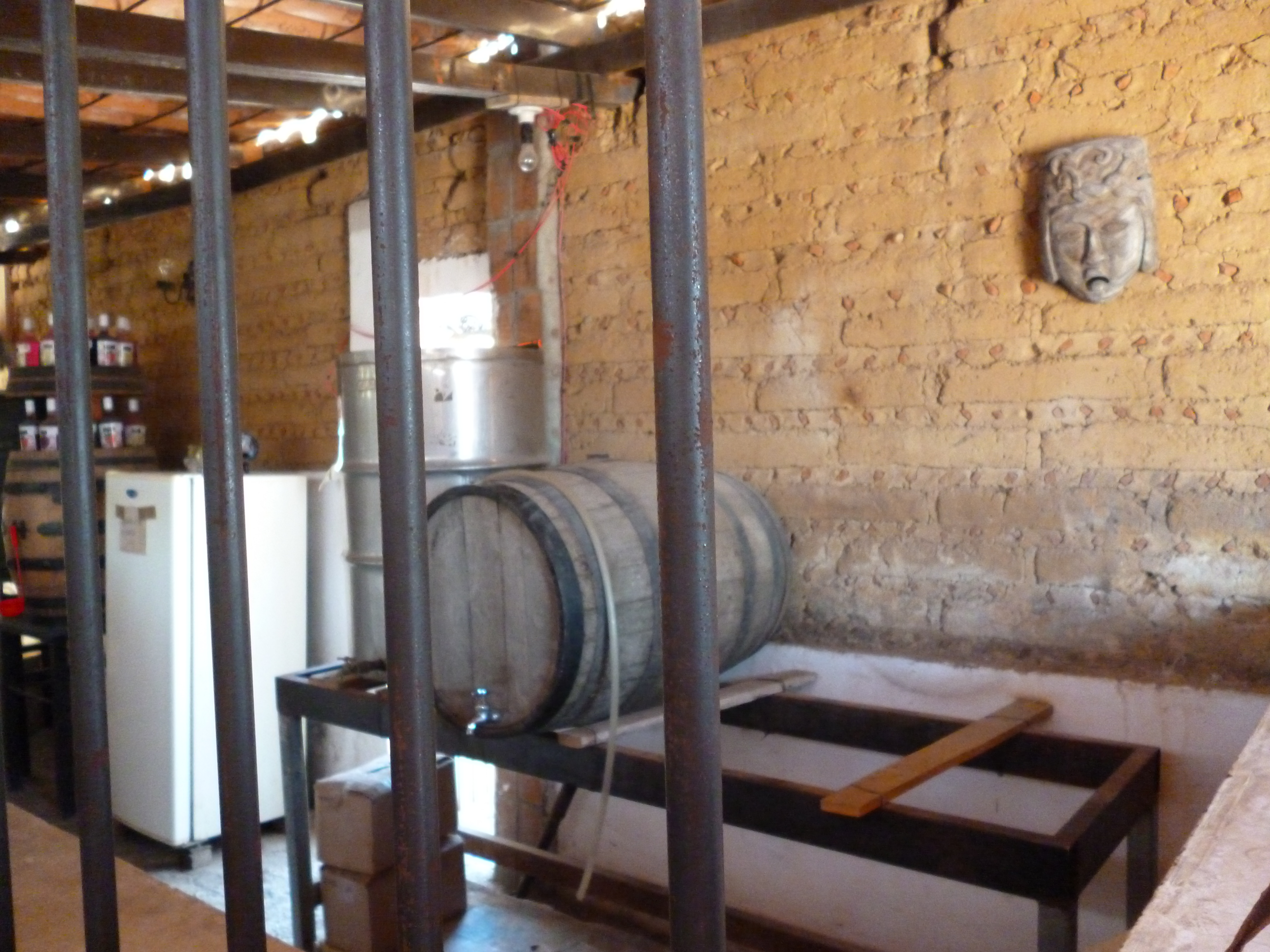
Inside a mezcal producer in Jantetelco, Morelos

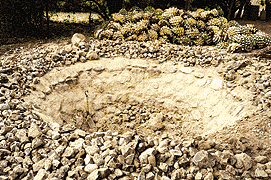
A typical earthen oven for roasting maguey hearts

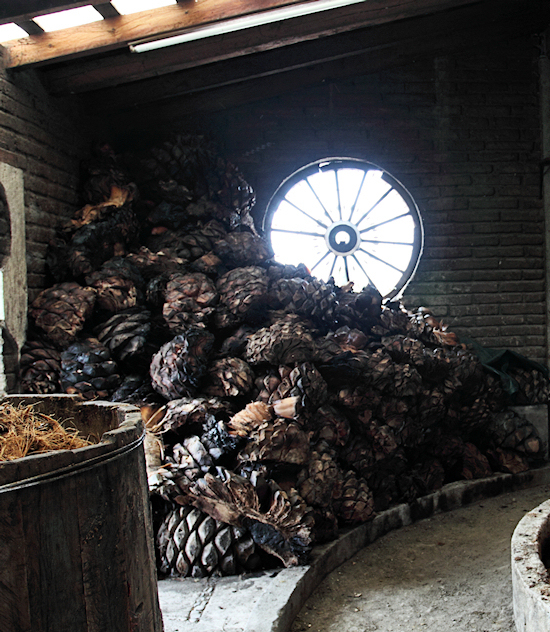
Roasted maguey (agave) hearts

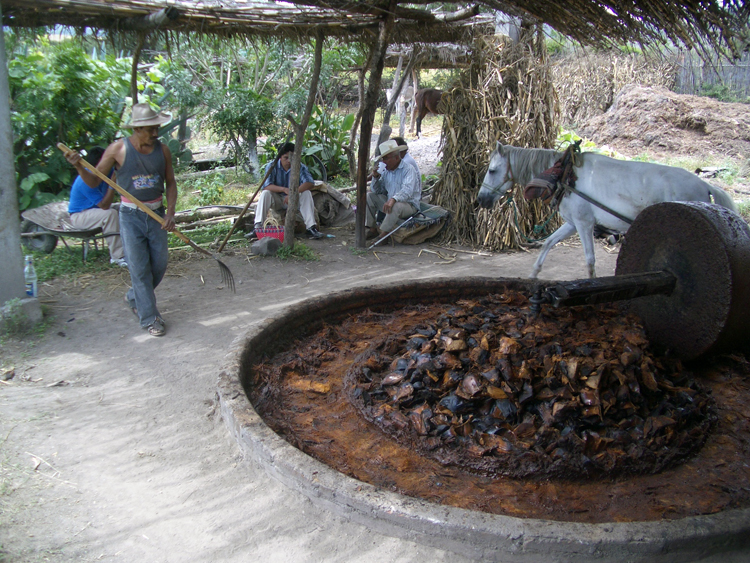
Grinding cooked maguey hearts

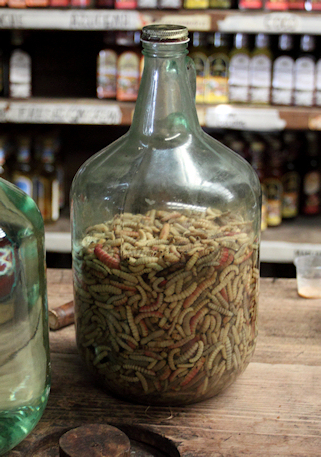
Gusano de maguey in a bottle, waiting to be added to finished bottles of mezcal

Traditionally, mezcal is handcrafted by small-scale producers. A village can contain dozens of production houses, called fábricas or palenques, each using methods that have been passed down from generation to generation, some using the same techniques practiced 200 years ago. This is an important difference with tequila which is nowadays mostly produced industrially.

The process begins by harvesting the plants, which can weigh 40 kg (88 pounds) each, and extracting the piña, or heart, by cutting off the plant's leaves and roots. The piñas are then cooked for about three days, often in pit ovens, which are earthen mounds over pits of hot rocks. This underground roasting gives mezcal its intense and distinctive smoky flavor. They are then crushed and mashed (traditionally by a stone wheel turned by a horse) and then left to ferment in large vats or barrels with water added.

The mash is allowed to ferment, the resulting liquid collected and distilled in either clay or copper pots which will further modify the flavor of the final product. The distilled product is then bottled and sold. Unaged mezcal is referred to as joven, or young. Some of the distilled product is left to age in barrels between one month and four years, but some can be aged for as long as 12 years. Mezcal can reach an alcohol content of 55%. Like tequila, mezcal is distilled twice. The first distillation is known as ordinario, and comes out at around 75 proof (37.5% alcohol by volume). The liquid must then be distilled a second time to raise the alcohol percentage.

Mezcal is highly varied, depending on the species of agave used, the fruits and herbs added during fermentation and the distillation process employed, creating subtypes with names such as de gusano, tobalá, pechuga, blanco, minero, cedrón, de alacrán, crema de café and more. A special recipe for a specific mezcal type known as de pechuga is distilled with a chicken breast. Other variations flavor the mash with cinnamon, pineapple slices, plátanos manzanos, and sugar, each imparting a particular character to the mezcal. Most mezcal, however, is left untouched, allowing the flavors of the agave used to come forward.

In the 1940s or 1950s, some mezcal producers began adding a gusano de maguey or "worm" (actually the larva of a moth, Comadia redtenbacheri) to bottles of mezcal. Not all bottles of mezcal contain a worm. For those that do, it is added during the bottling process. There are conflicting stories as to why such a thing would be added. Some state that it is a marketing ploy. Others state that it is there to prove that the mezcal is fit to drink, and still others state that the larva is there to impart flavor. Similar ingedients are scorpions (de alacrán) and snakes.

The two types of mezcal are those made of 100% agave and those mixed with other ingredients, with at least 60% agave. Both types have four categories. Joven (white) mezcal is clear and hardly aged. Dorado (golden) is not aged but caramel is added. This is more often done with a mixed mezcal. Reposado is aged in wood barrels from two to nine months. This can be done with 100% agave or mixed mezcals. Añejo is aged in barrels for a minimum of 12 months. The best of this type are generally aged from 18 months to three years. If the añejo is of 100% agave, it is usually aged for about four years.

Mexico has about 330,000 hectares (820,000 acres) cultivating agave for mezcal, owned by 9,000 producers. Over 6 million liters (1,300,000 imp gal; 1,600,000 U.S. gal) are produced in Mexico annually, with more than 150 brand names.

The industry generates about 29,000 jobs directly and indirectly. Certified production in 2008 amounted to more than 2 million liters (440,000 imp gal; 530,000 U.S. gal); 434,000 liters (95,000 imp gal; 115,000 U.S. gal) were exported, generating 21 million dollars in income. To truly be called mezcal, the liquor must come from certain areas. States that have certified mezcal agave growing areas with production facilities are Durango, Guanajuato, Guerrero, Oaxaca, San Luis Potosí, Puebla, Michoacan, Tamaulipas, and Zacatecas. About 30 species of agave are certified for use in the production of mezcal. Oaxaca has 570 of the 625 mezcal production facilities in Mexico, but some in-demand mezcals come from Guerrero, as well. In Tamaulipas, 11 municipalities have received authorization to produce authentic mezcal with the hopes of competing for a piece of both the Mexican national and international markets. The agave used here is agave Americano, agave verde or maguey de la Sierra, which are native to the state.

Oaxaca produces 90% of the mezcal in Mexico, which presents a serious environmental threat to the state, according to local deputy Elena Cuevas Hernández. She notes that ten liters (2.2 imp gal; 2.6 U.S. gal) of water and seven kilograms (15 lb) of firewood are required for the production of one liter (0.22 imp gal; 0.26 U.S. gal) of mezcal, which comes to ten liters (2.2 imp gal; 2.6 U.S. gal) per batch consuming 6,000 liters (1,300 imp gal; 1,600 U.S. gal) of water and 2,100 kilograms (4,600 lb) of firewood. In 2019, Mexico produced 7.1 million liters (1,600,000 imp gal; 1,900,000 U.S. gal) of mezcal and consumed 1,429,000,000 liters (314,000,000 imp gal; 378,000,000 U.S. gal) of water and 45,000,000 kilograms (50,000 short tons) of wood. Water is used both for irrigation of the maguey plants and cooling the distilled product; wood is used to bake the leaves. Certain communities already control or prohibit cutting firewood. The deputy also warns of pollution related to inadequate disposal of rotting stalks left in the fields and pollutants with low pH (3 or 4) and methane (CH_{4}). Yet another problem is the low pay that producers receive.

Despite the similar name, mezcal does not contain mescaline or other psychedelic substances.

== Drinking ==
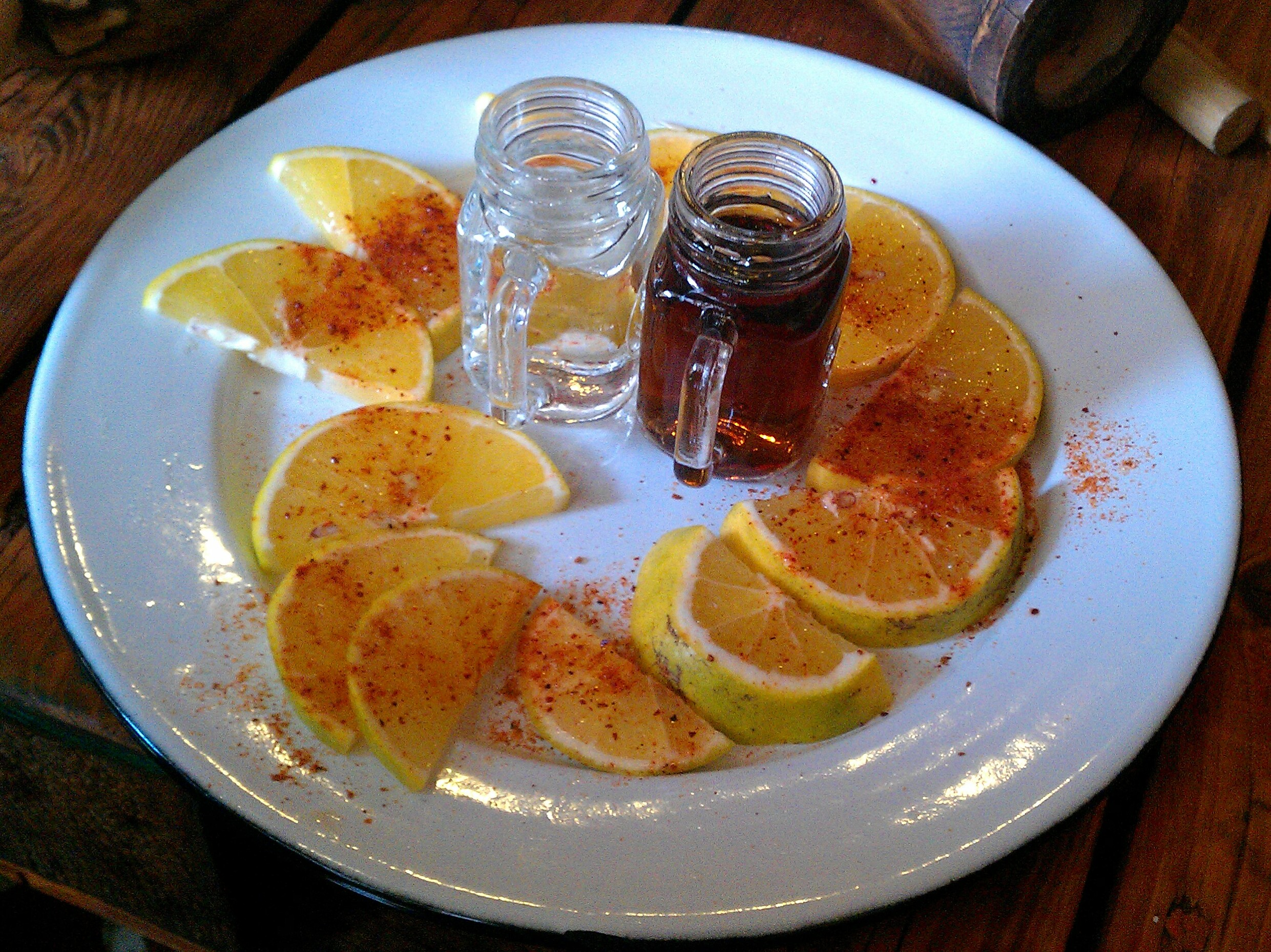
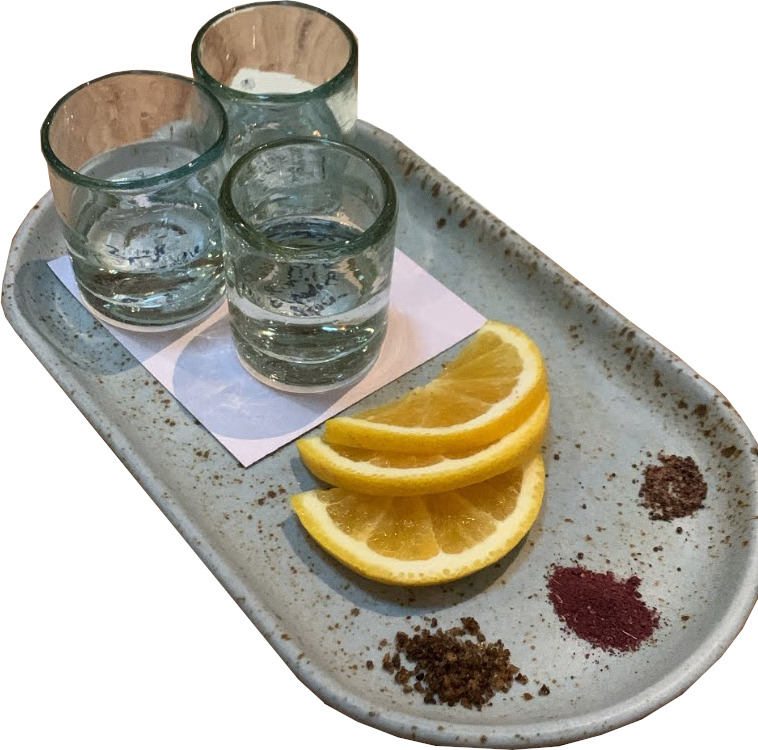
Mezcals served with orange slices and various salts in (left) Tepoztlán and (right) Austin, Texas

In Mexico, mezcal is generally drunk straight, rather than mixed in a cocktail. Mezcal is generally not mixed with any other liquids, but is often accompanied with sliced oranges, lemon or lime sprinkled with a mixture of ground fried larvae, ground chili peppers, and salt called sal de gusano, which literally translates as "worm salt". A saying attributed to Oaxaca regarding the drink is: "Para todo mal, mezcal, y para todo bien, también; y si no hay remedio, litro y medio" ("For everything bad, mezcal, and for everything good, as well; and if there is no remedy, liter and a half").

In the US, Europe, and Japan, mezcal is increasingly becoming a prominent ingredient on many craft cocktail menus, due to its unique combination of smoky and vegetal notes. Often mezcal is swapped for a more traditional spirit, in cocktails such as the "mezcal old fashioned" and the "mezcal Negroni".

== Exportation ==
In the 21st century, mezcal, especially from Oaxaca, has been exported. Exportation has been on the increase and government agencies have been helping smaller-scale producers obtain the equipment and techniques needed to produce higher quantities and qualities for export. The National Program of Certification of the Quality of Mezcal certifies places of origin for export products. Mezcal is sold in 27 countries on three continents. The two countries that import the most are the United States and Japan, and exports are increasing as the liquor grows in popularity. In the United States, a number of entrepreneurs have teamed up with Mexican producers to sell their products in the country, by promoting its handcrafted quality, as well as the Oaxacan culture strongly associated with it.

The booming industry has been met with opposition from ecological activists, in 2021 San-Francisco based neozapatismo news outlet Radio Zapatista, released an article on the damage the industry and its mass-production is doing to the environment of the Mixteca Region and the cultures of the region.

== Festival ==
The state of Oaxaca sponsors the International Mezcal Festival every year in the capital city, Oaxaca de Juárez. There, locals and tourists can sample and buy a large variety of mezcals made in the state. Mezcals from other states, such as Guerrero, Guanajuato, and Zacatecas also participate. This festival was started in 1997 to accompany the yearly Guelaguetza festival. In 2009, the festival had over 50,000 visitors, and brought in 4 million pesos to the economy.

== In the media ==
On September 29, 2024, CBS 60 Minutes contained a segment "The Mezcaleros" on the tradition of Mezcal in Oaxaca, Mexico.

== See also ==
- Cocuy
- Kahlúa
- Mexican beer
- Mexican cuisine
- Mexican wine
- Miske
- Santiago Matatlán
- Tiswin
- Smoke Water
