= Sotol =

Mexican distilled beverage made from sotol, a desert plant

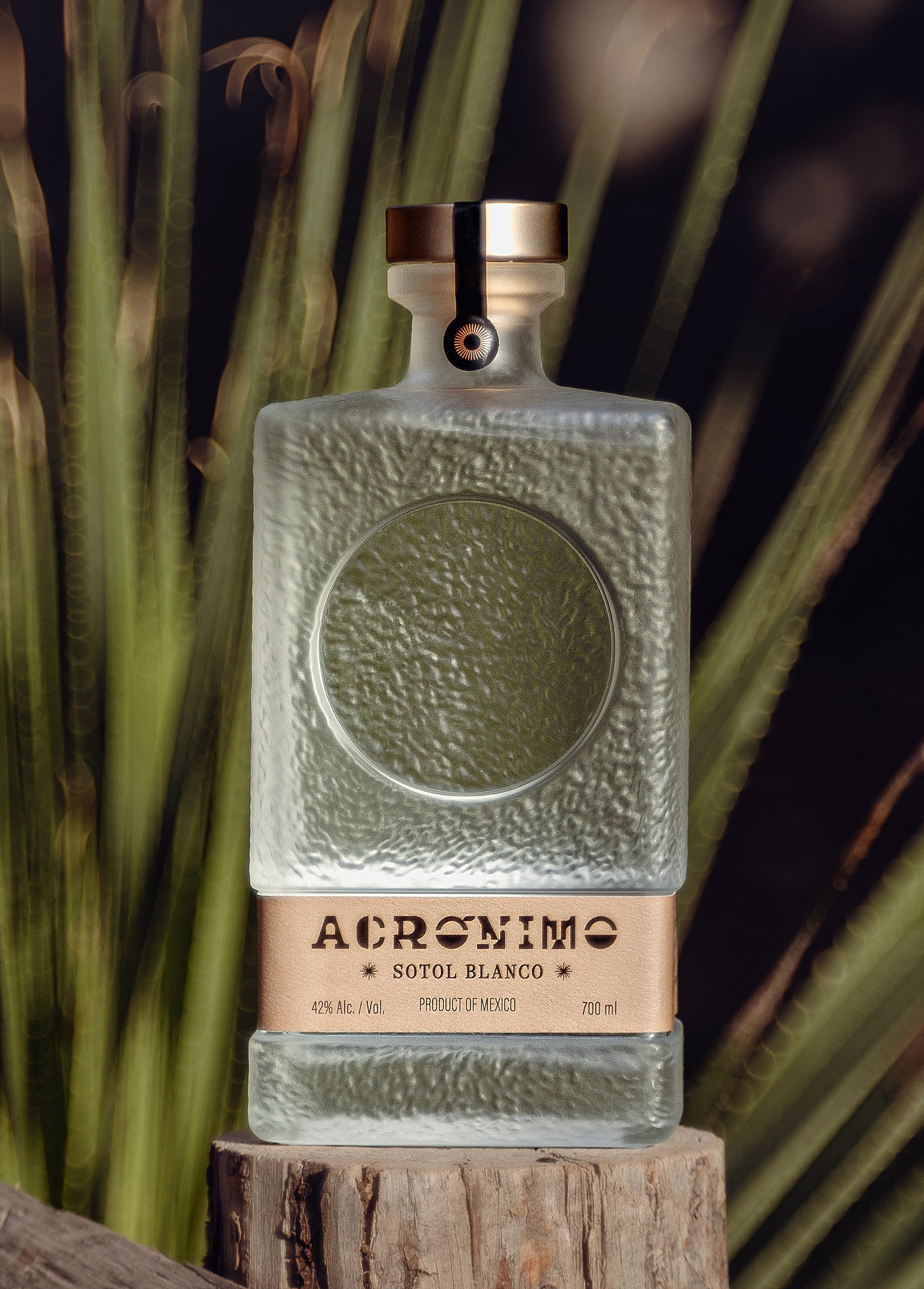
A bottle of sotol blanco

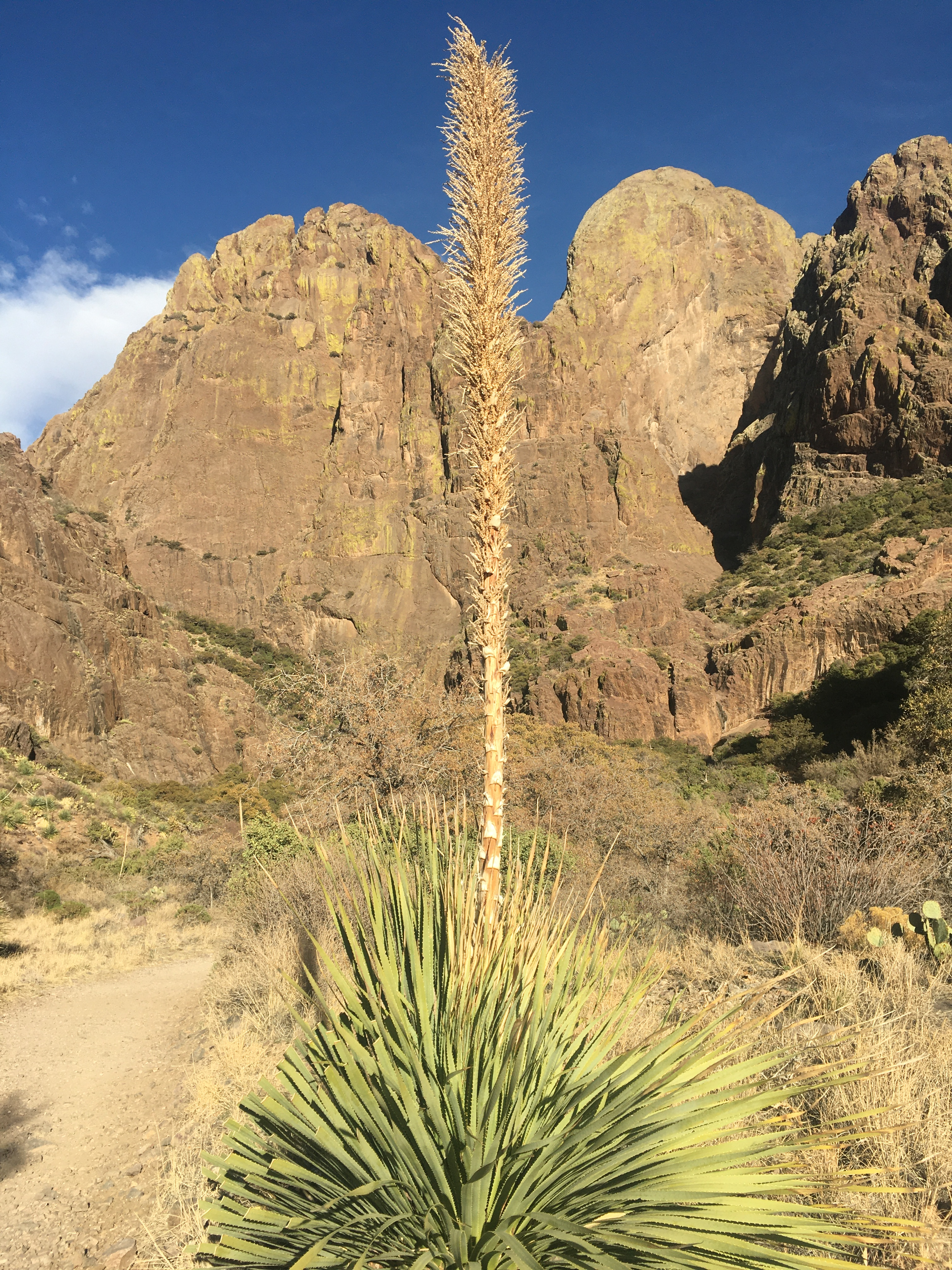
A flowering sotol plant in southern New Mexico

Sotol is a distilled spirit made from the plants of the genus Dasylirion, which grow in the Chihuahuan desert of northern Mexico, New Mexico, Arizona, and west and central Texas. Sotol liquor is known as the state spirit of Chihuahua; however, the drink is also consumed in Durango and Coahuila. Sotol has a registered Denominación de Origen from the government of Mexico since 2002, and may be produced only in Chihuahua, Coahuila and Durango. Dozens of commercial examples are available.

Production of sotol spirits exists outside the Sotol Denomination of Origin in several regions such as Sonora (where it is known as "Palmilla"), Oaxaca ("Cucharillo"), and the Texas Hill Country ("Texas Sotol"). With sotol on the rise in terms of its popularity, more brands are beginning to come onto the scene. The taste is similar to tequila and mezcal.

It is produced in a manner similar to the more common artisanal mezcals of central Mexico.

== History ==
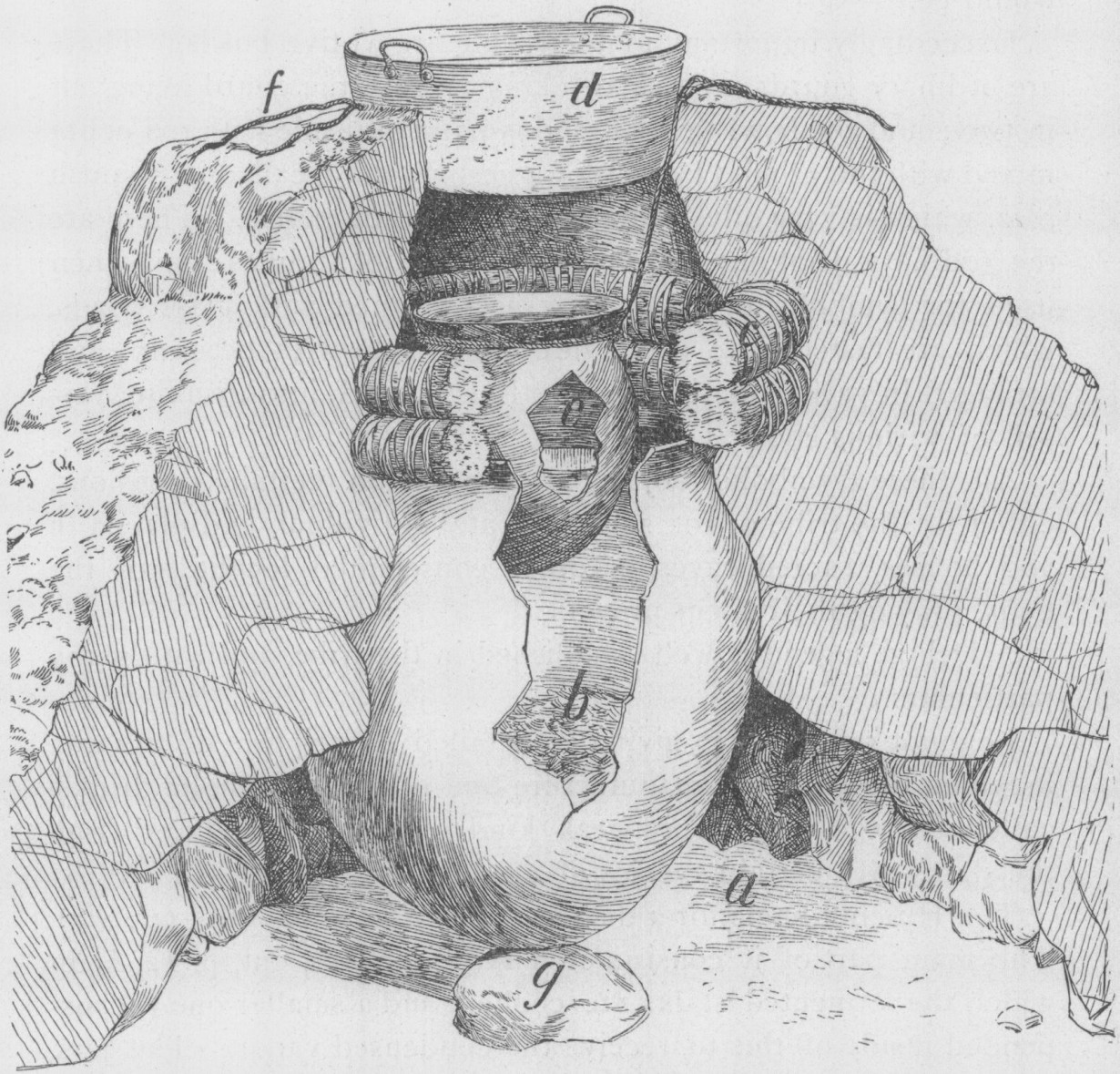
A Huichol still for distilling sotol, a modified version of a Filipino still (c.1898)

The indigenous people of the Chihuahuan desert, such as the Jumano Pueblos and the Lipan Apache, have made this traditional drink for centuries. Other natives of Chihuahua, such as the Rarámuri, fermented sotol juice into a beer-like alcoholic beverage as early as 800 years ago.

Distillation technology was introduced in the 16th century by early Filipino immigrants who arrived via the Manila galleons to the coastal regions of western Mexico. Distinctive Filipino-type stills were initially used by Filipino coconut farmers in distilling tubâ into "vino de coco" (coconut sap liquor). This technology and the knowledge of liquor production were acquired by the indigenous peoples who worked in the coconut plantations. They were then used to distill native drinks, resulting in mezcal and sotol.

The beverage was illegal in Mexico until 1994, and it was granted a denomination of origin (DO) in 2002. According to the DO authorized by the Mexican Institute of Industrial Property, Sotol can only be produced in Chihuahua, Coahuila, and Durango. In 2020 The United States refrained from recognizing Mexico's DO during the final drafting of the United States–Mexico–Canada Agreement. This edit was made at the request of Texas Senator John Cornyn. Distilleries in Texas produce the spirit under the same name, to the chagrin of Mexican sotoleros, the Mexican state and Federal governments, and their supporters. Accusations of unsustainable harvesting of the Dasylirion plants and cultural appropriation are the principal criticisms. One Mexican sotolero stated, “The Americans can make what they want, but they cannot call it sotol, Sotol belongs to us.”

== Production ==
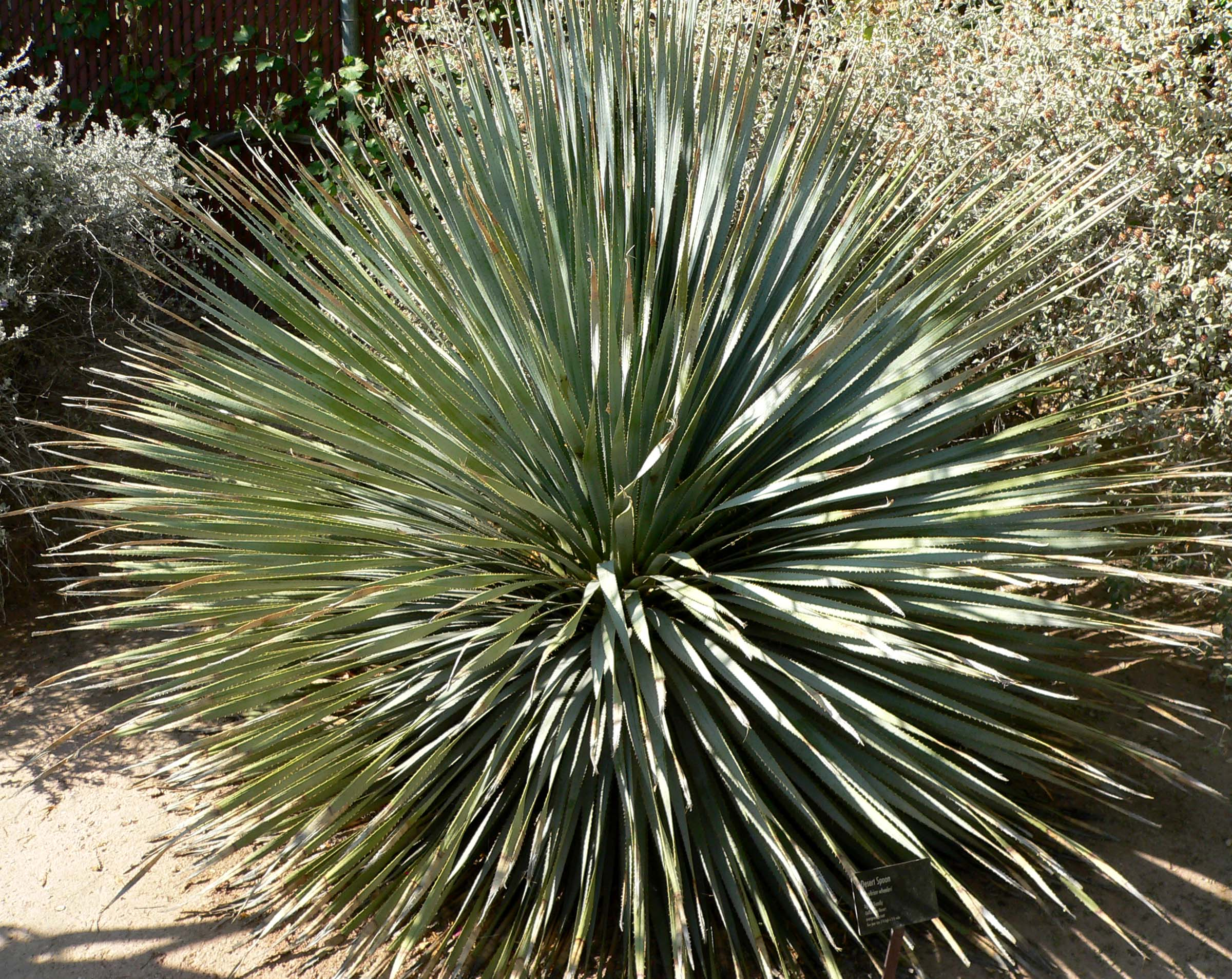
Dasylirion wheeleri

Sotol plants typically grow on rocky slopes in the Chihuahuan desert grassland, between 1,000 and 2,000 meters above sea level. The plants take approximately 8–12 years to mature and yield only one bottle of sotol per plant.

The sotol plant is similar to agave, as they both belong to the Asparagaceae family of plants. While the leaves of agave are fat and fleshy and the leaves of the sotol are thin and flexible, both sotol and agave leaves grow out of a characteristic core, called a piña. These plants store much of their sugars and starches in the piña, and the piña is what is harvested to make the spirit. With sotol, harvesting can be done leaving the roots intact, allowing the plant to re-grow.

The outer leaves are removed to reveal the center core, which is taken back to the distillery. The core can then be cooked and/or steamed, shredded, fermented, and distilled.

To determine the alcohol content of finished sotol, a small amount is poured into and passed between two cow's horns. Doing this creates small bubbles, or "pearls", which reflect the density of the alcohol. Larger bubbles indicate higher alcohol content.

The species of Dasylirion most commonly used for production of sotol are Dasylirion wheeleri (also known as "Desert spoon"), Dasylirion durangense, Dasylirion cedrosanum, and Dasylirion leiophyllum; less commonly with Dasylirion texanum and Dasylirion lucidum.

== Characteristics ==
Sotol is described as having a "smoky, earthy flavor", similar to tequila and mezcal. Compared to those two spirits, sotol is said to taste "bright and grassy."

The taste of sotol is influenced by the region in which its plants grow. Sotol made from plants in forested regions, which get more rain, may have tastes of "menthol, eucalyptus, a very fresh taste like mushrooms or pine," according to Ricardo Pico, founder of Clande Sotol. Sotols grown in more arid desert regions can taste more "earthy or spicy, which can translate into leather, cacao or peppery notes."

Most sotols are sold unaged ("joven", or young), but sotol can be aged in wooden barrels to "reposado" or "añejo" levels, similar to how aged tequila is classified.
