= Giovanni Faber =

German doctor, botanist, and art collector (1574–1629)

- Born: 1574; Bamberg
- Died: 1629 (aged 54–55)
- Education: University of Würzburg
- Known for: Lincean, naming the microscope.
- Scientific career
- Fields: Botany, medicine, anatomy

Giovanni Faber (or Johann Faber, sometimes also known as Fabri or Fabro; 1574–1629) was a German papal doctor, botanist and art collector, originally from Bamberg in Bavaria, who lived in Rome from 1598. He was curator of the Vatican botanical garden, a member and the secretary of the Accademia dei Lincei. He acted throughout his career as a political broker between Maximilian I, Elector of Bavaria and Rome. He was a friend of fellow Linceian Galileo Galilei and the German painters in Rome, Johann Rottenhammer and Adam Elsheimer. He has also been credited with inventing the name "microscope".

== Biography ==
Johann Faber was born the son of Protestant parents in Bamberg in 1574. When he was one year old, he was orphaned by an epidemic of the plague. He was raised and educated in the Catholic faith by his cousin Philip Schmidt. He studied medicine at the University of Würzburg and graduated in 1597. In order to continue his studies he moved to Rome in 1598, where he worked as a doctor in the hospital of Santo Spirito in Sassia. His practical studies of anatomy proceeded from direct observation of the human body. He later turned exclusively to the study of animal anatomy. In 1600 he was appointed to the chair of Botany and of Anatomy at the Sapienza University of Rome. In the same year he became the director of the Papal botanical garden (now the Orto Botanico dell'Università di Roma "La Sapienza").

== Diplomacy at the papal court ==
Thanks to these new engagements he attended the papal court more regularly and gradually became known as an effective spokesman for people from his homeland with sensitive causes. He also cultivated deep artistic interests, becoming an avid collector of paintings. In 1611 Faber's interest in natural investigation led him to become a member of the Accademia dei Lincei. Faber attended the papal court regularly under five Popes (Clement VIII, Leo XI, Paul V, Gregory XV and Urban VIII), and developed friendships with powerful figures including cardinals Cinzio Aldobrandini, Scipione Borghese, Francesco Barberini and Scipione Cobelluzzi. With these important connections, he was entrusted over many years with confidential business by many leading German families, including the Fuggers of Augsburg, the brothers Philip III, Landgrave of Hesse-Butzbach and Frederick I, Landgrave of Hesse-Homburg, the Landgraves of Hesse-Darmstadt Ludwig V and his son George II, John Casimir, Count of Erbach-Breuberg, Frederick IV of Fürstenberg and Philipp Otto zu Salm.

== Visit to Naples ==
In 1608 Faber was sent by Pope Paul V to Naples. The Pope wanted him to report discreetly about the conditions in which Tommaso Campanella was being held in the Castel Sant'Elmo, where he had been held since his imprisonment in 1600 for unorthodox views and rebellion. Faber's contacts Caspar Schoppe and the Fuggers also encouraged him to use his good offices on Campanella's behalf. Faber's visit seems to have been instrumental in securing Campanella's transfer to the more humane prison of Castel dell'Ovo. However, the official purpose of his visit to Naples was to gather exotic plants for the Vatican gardens. Faber spent two months, enjoying the vigorous intellectual life of Naples with men such as Ferrante Imperato, Giambattista Della Porta, Fabio Colonna, Giulio Cesare Capaccio, Nicola Antonio Stigliola, Quinzio Bongiovanni, Mario Schipani, Marco Aurelio Severino and Brother Donato D'Eremita and learning about plants, botanical gardens and collections of rare objects.

== Scientific Interests ==
His interest in natural philosophy continued to develop after his return to Rome. Here he was a frequent visitor to the pharmacy of his friend the Dutch botanist Enrico Corvino at the sign of the Imperial Eagle in Montegiordano, where many of the city's artists and physicians gathered. Faber was also friendly with Peter Paul Rubens who was working in the city until 1608, as well as other painters and miniaturists. Corvino was to become a member of the Accademia dei Lincei in 1611, and Faber came to know a number of the men who were involved in its work, including Federico Cesi, its founder, Johann Schreck and Theophilus Müller. On 29 October 1611, Faber himself became a member.

December 1612 saw the visit to Rome of Johann Gottfried von Aschhausen, Prince-Bishop of Bamberg. Faber hoped to make him a gift of a telescope, but was unable to do so owing to the difficulties Galileo was experiencing in producing lenses of sufficiently high quality. Nevertheless, he was able to use the visit to help foster academic projects in Germany, ensuring that the Bishop was given a number of books written by members of the Accademia, and a sample volume of Hernandez's Mexicanarum plantarum which Cesi had charged Schreck and Faber with editing. Faber's work, with a dedication to Francesco Barberini, was finally published in 1628 under the title Animalia Mexicana, while the edited version of Hernandez' full original was published only after his death, in 1651.

== Naming the microscope ==
Giovanni Faber has been credited with giving the microscope its name. In 1609 fellow Lincean Galileo developed a compound microscope with a convex and a concave lens, which he called the occhiolino, the "little eye". In 1624 Galileo presented his occhiolino to Prince Federico Cesi, founder of the Accademia dei Lincei. One year later Giovanni Faber coined the word microscope from the Greek words μικρόν (micron) meaning "small", and σκοπεῖν (skopein) meaning "to look at". The word was meant to be analogous with telescope, another word coined by the Linceans.

== Family ==
In 1608 Faber became a naturalised Roman by adopting the legal status of "civis romanus": on 19 August 1612, he married Maria Anna Hyrler, who was herself born in Rome to German parents. Faber died on 17 September 1629 and was buried, in accordance with his last wish, in the church of Santa Maria dell'Anima next to his wife who had died some two years previously. He was survived by several children; Maria Vittoria, Maria Maddalena and Giano Domenico.
