= Orto Botanico dell'Università di Roma "La Sapienza" =

Botanical garden in Rome, Italy

Orto Botanico dell'Università di Roma La Sapienza
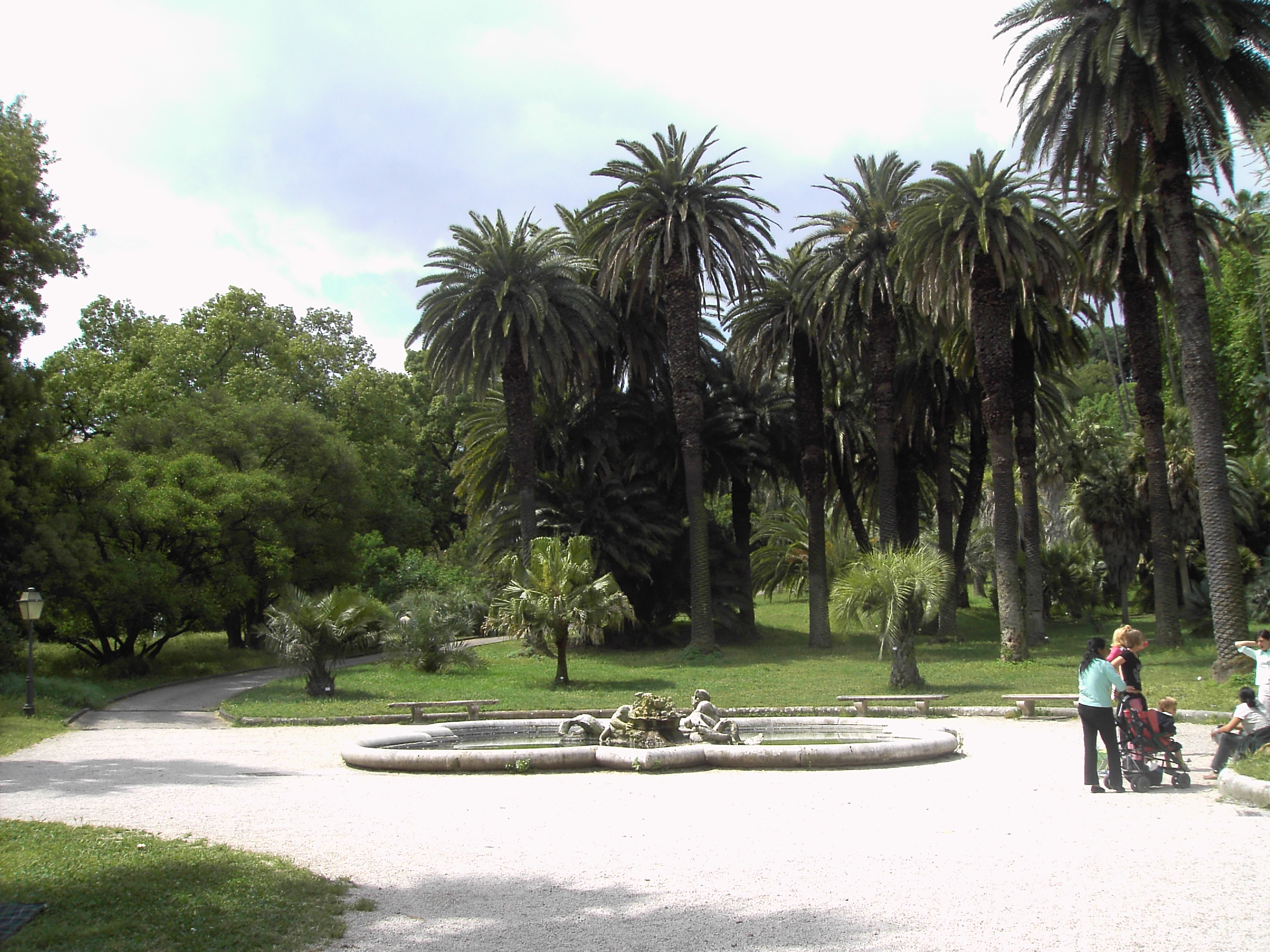
- Orto Botanico di Roma
- Click on the map for a fullscreen view
- Type: Urban park
- Nearest city: Rome
- Coordinates: 41°53′31″N 12°27′50″E

The Orto Botanico dell'Università di Roma "La Sapienza" (12 hectares), also known as the Orto Botanico di Roma, is a botanical garden operated by the Sapienza University of Rome and located at Largo Cristina di Svezia 24, Rome, Italy. It is open every day including Sundays; an admission fee is charged.

The garden was established on this site in 1883, although it is the successor to the Papal Botanical Gardens going back to the Renaissance. It is sited on the slopes of the Janiculum overlooking the 17th-century Palazzo Corsini, which was from 1659 to 1689 the residence of Queen Christina of Sweden, now the headquarters of the Accademia dei Lincei. Part of the current Botanical Garden used to be the private garden of the Palazzo Corsini. After the Palace became property of the Italian state, they were merged with the existing Papal gardens to create the current lay-out.

Today the garden contains more than 3,000 species, with a Japanese garden, bamboo groves, and a Giardino dei Semplici (over 300 species of medicinal plants). Noteworthy specimens include Cedrus deodara, Dasylirion glaucophyllum and Dasylirion acrotrichum, Erythrina crista-galli, and Liquidambar orientalis. There are several greenhouses containing a significant collection of cacti, as well as carnivorous plants, and tropical plants including euphorbia and orchids.

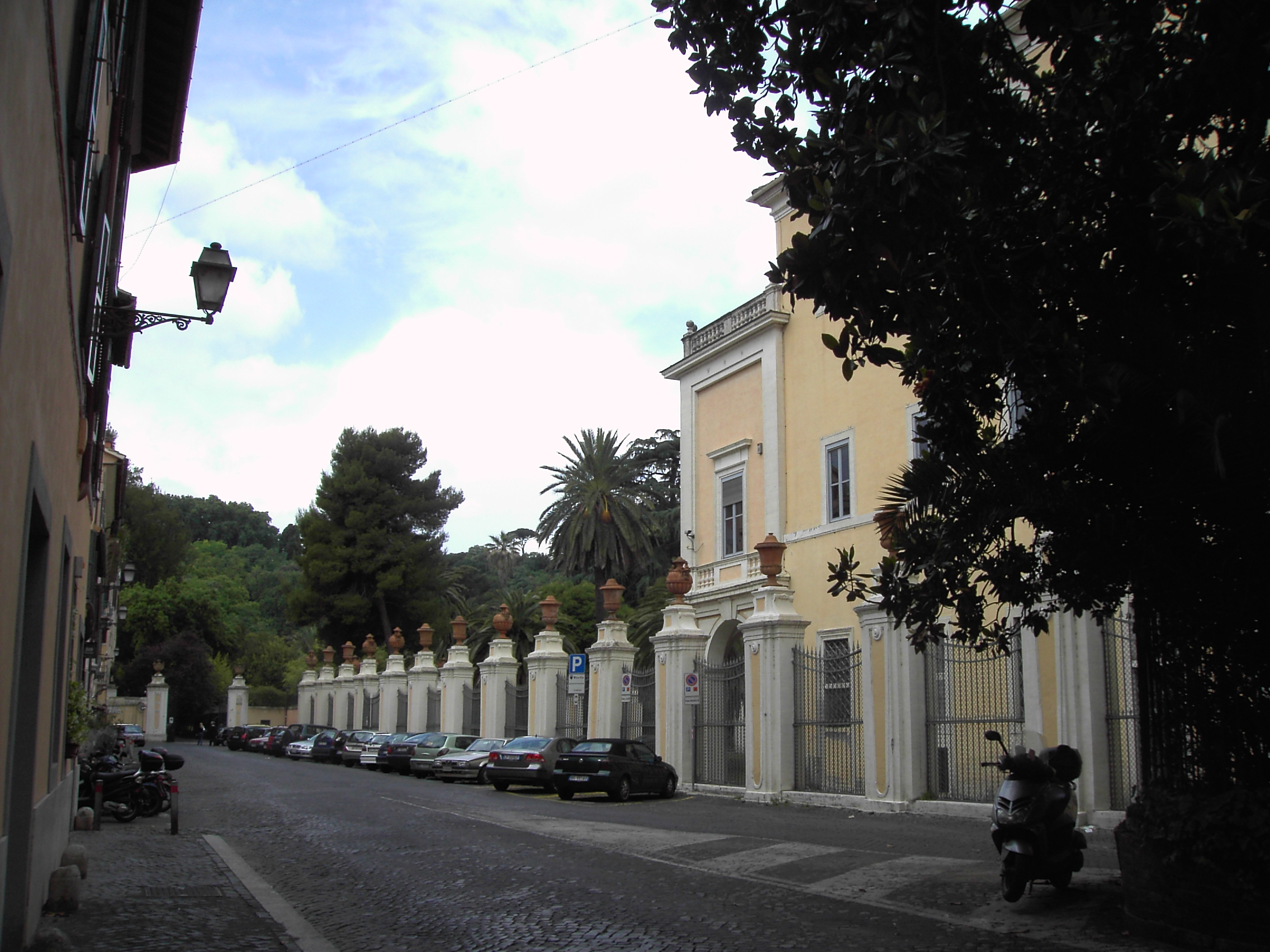
Garden entrance

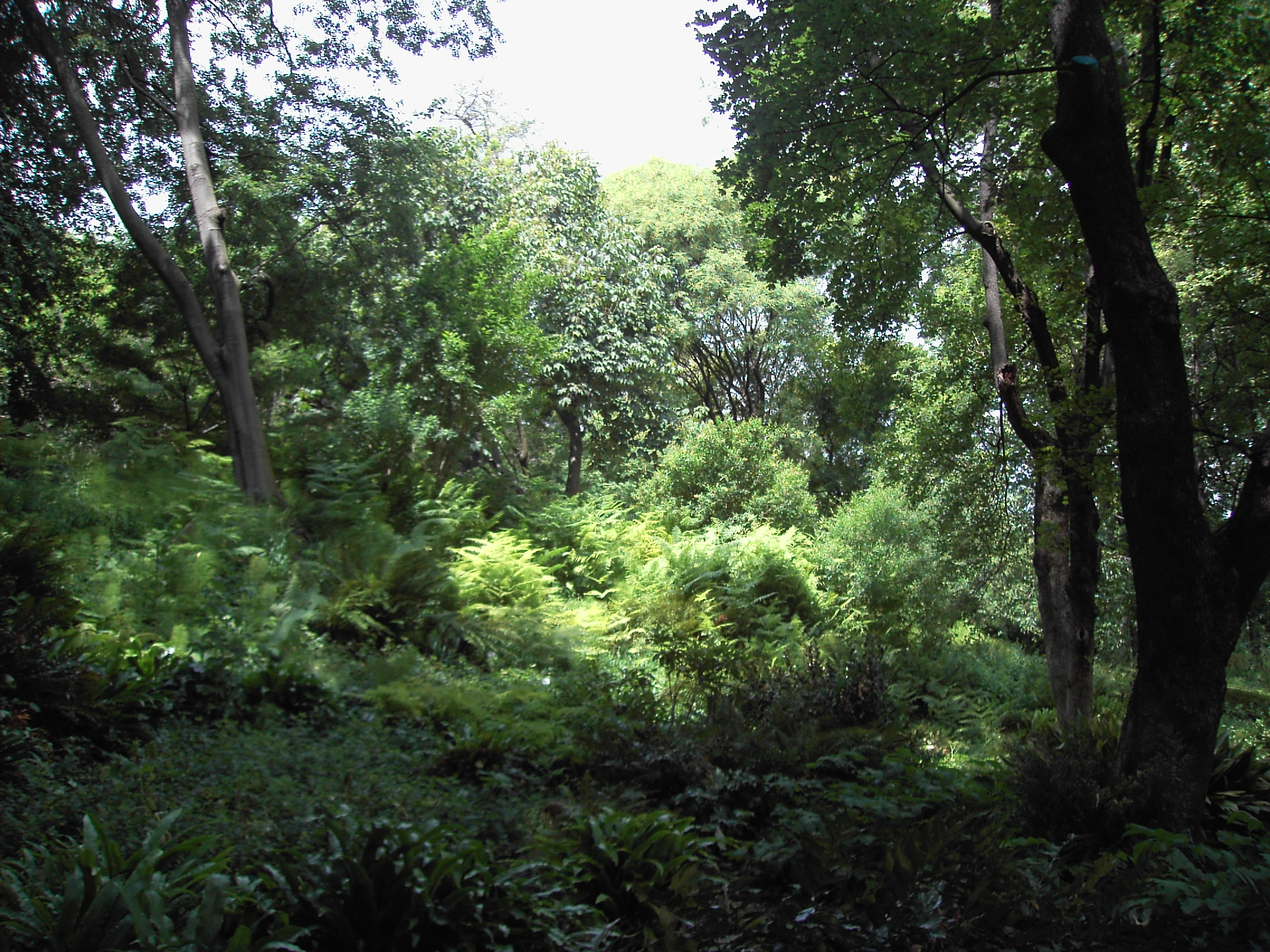
Valley of ferns

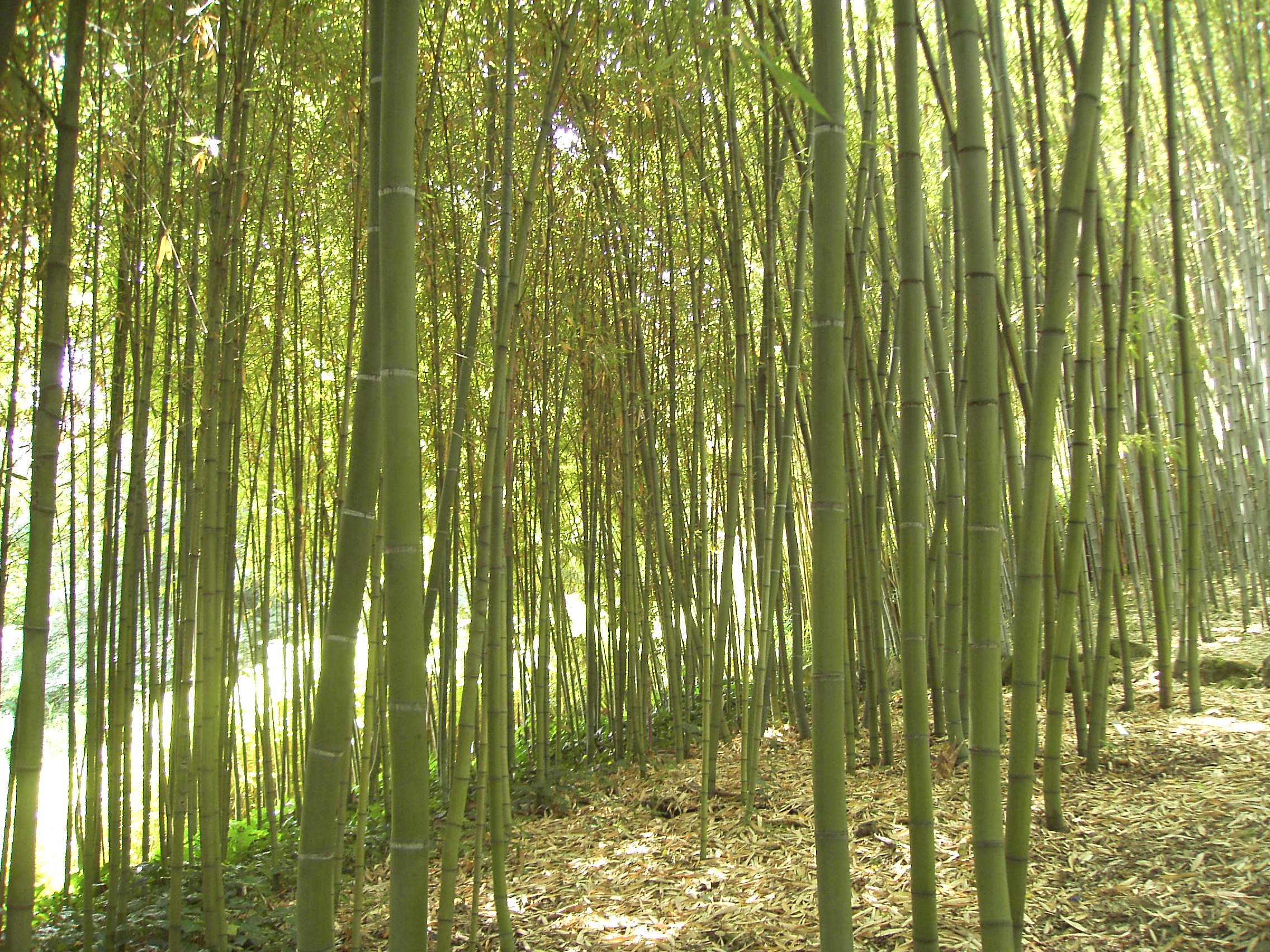
Bamboo

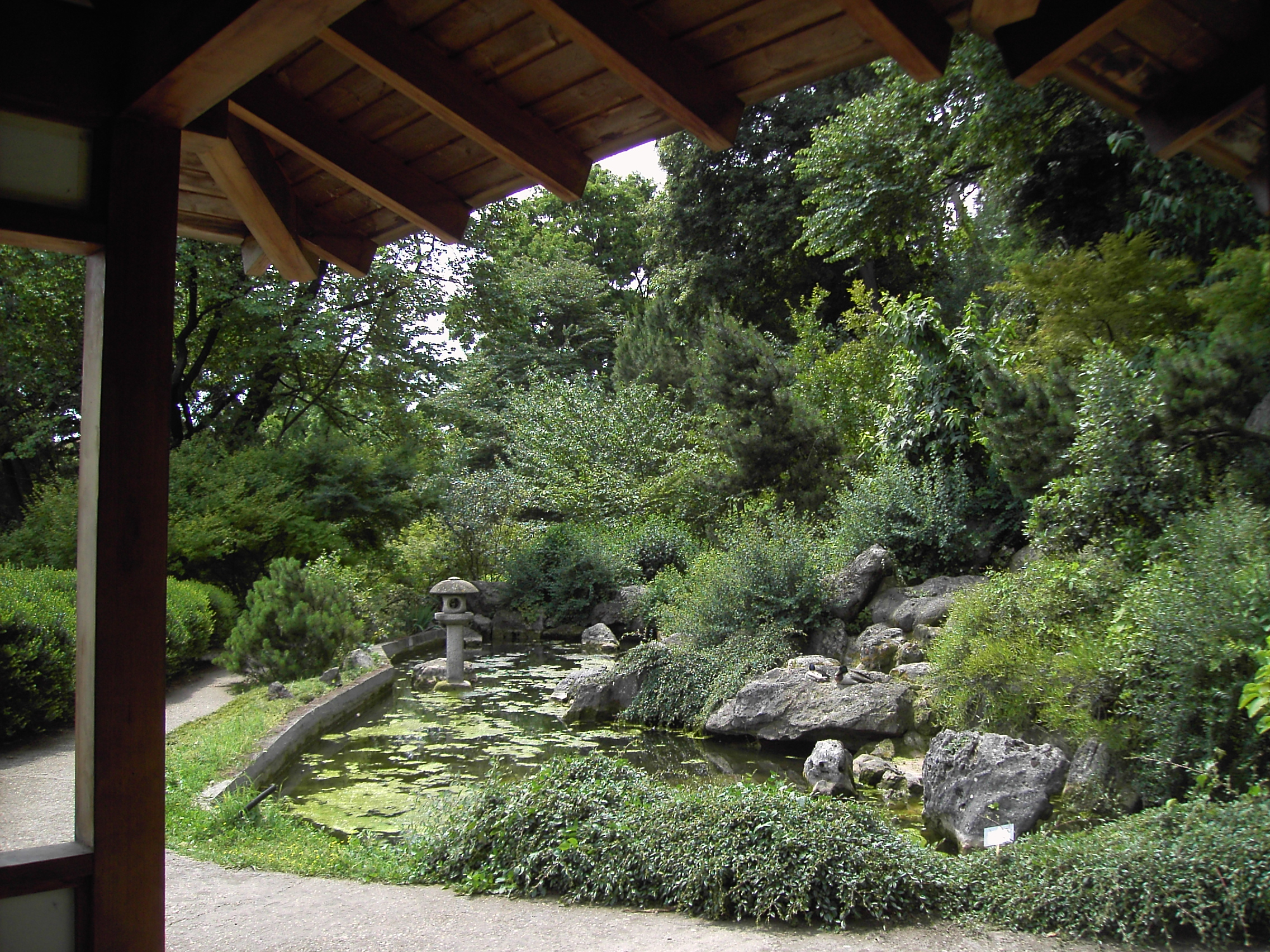
Japanese garden

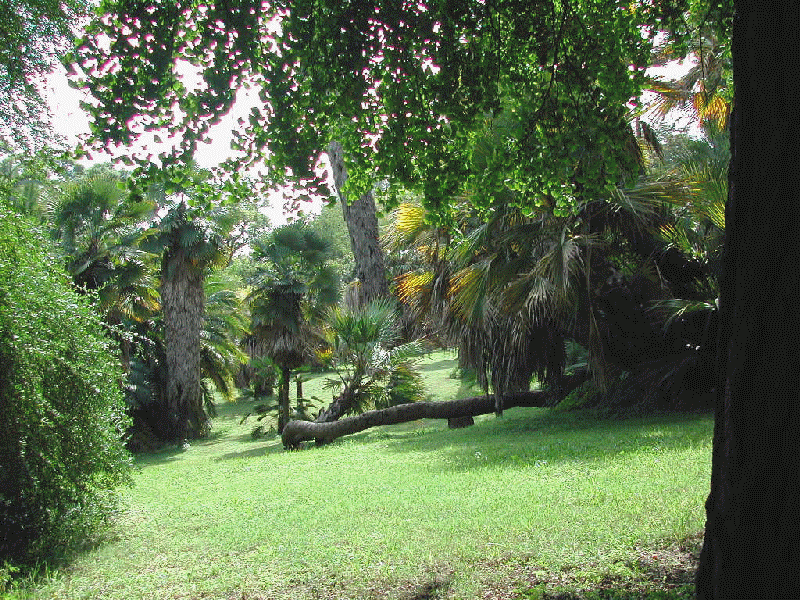
Nannorrhops ritchiana Aitch.

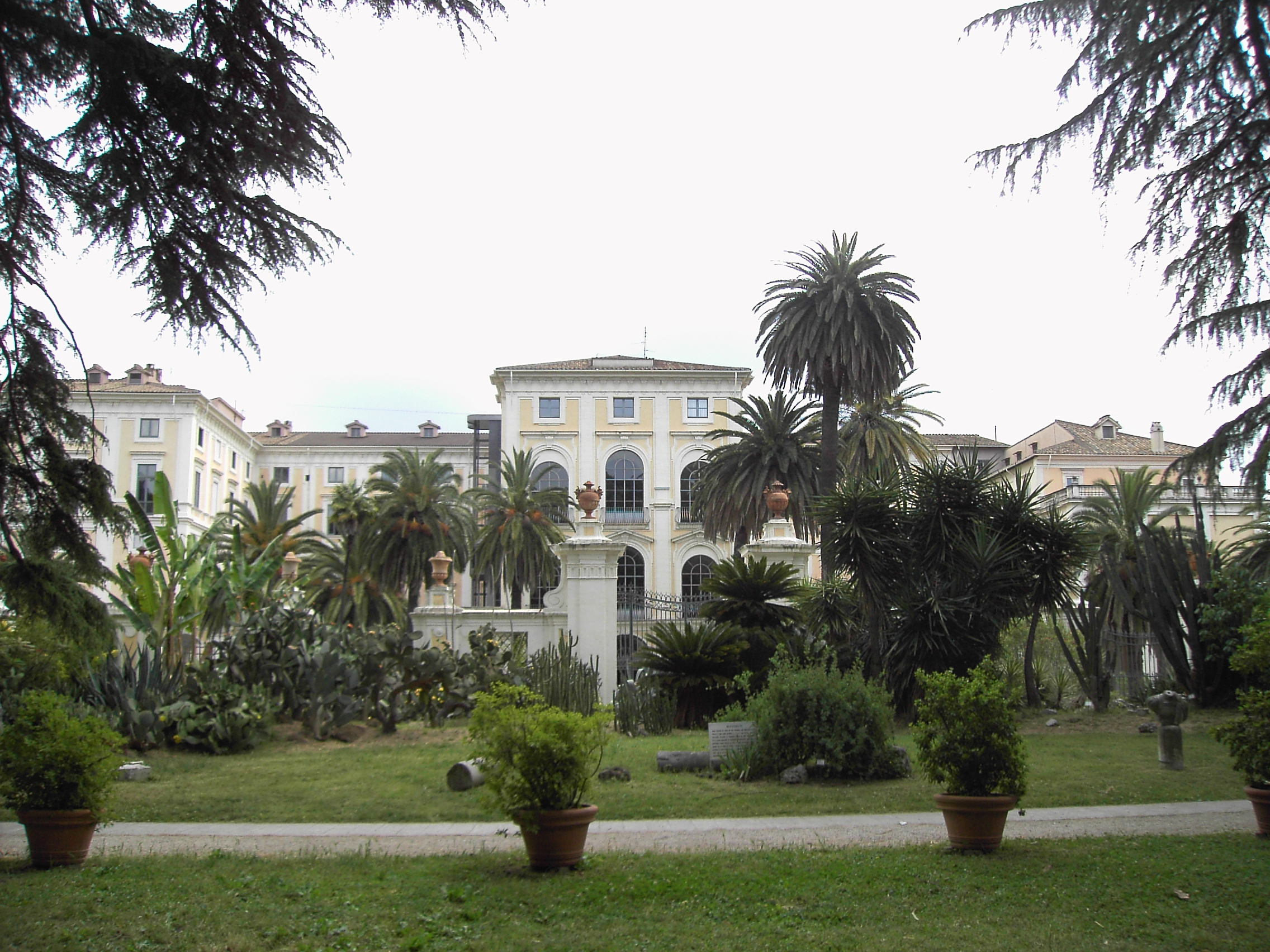
Villa Corsini from the pack

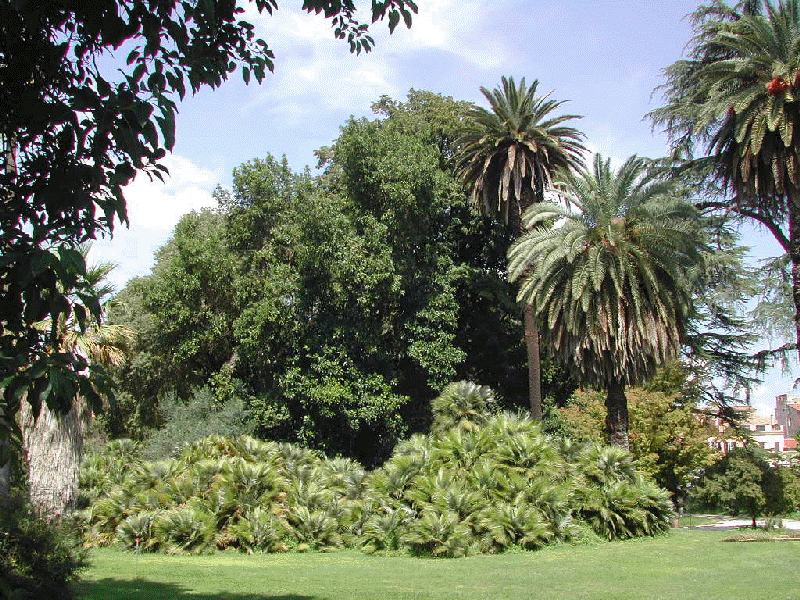
Palms

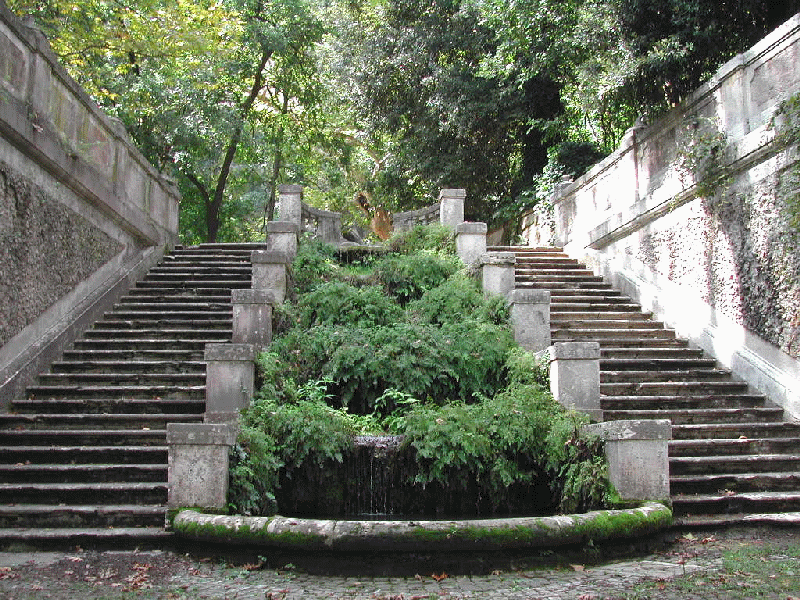
Stairs with cascade

== Directors of the Papal Botanical Gardens ==
- Michele Mercati (1566–1593)
- Andrea Cesalpino (probably; 1593–1600)
- Giovanni Faber (1600–1629)

== See also ==
- List of botanical gardens in Italy

== External sources ==
- Orto Botanico dell'Università di Roma "La Sapienza" (Italian)
- Minor Sights: The Botanical Garden of Rome
