= Quinzio Bongiovanni =

Italian doctor and scholar

Quinzio Bongiovanni (or Quinto Buongiovanni) (Tropea c.1550 - Naples 5 June 1612) was an Italian doctor and scholar, active in the disputes between traditional scholasticism and the natural philosophy of Bernardino Telesio, Giambattista della Porta and members of the Accademia dei Lincei.

== Family background and career ==
Quinzio Bongiovanni was the son of Giovan Nicola, a doctor, and Lamberta Fazzari. The family had probably originally come from Maida, which it left to escape the feudal domination of the House of Caracciolo, and moved into the Palazzo Bongiovanni, home to the Vianeo brothers, pioneering surgeons, who were also from Maida. Quinzio finished his studies in medicine and philosophy under Giovan Bernardino Longo and Giovan Girolamo Polverino in Naples. In 1571 he published the work for which he is principally remembered, Peripateticarum disputationum de principiis naturae (Venice 1571), dedicated to Cardinal Antonio Carafa. He was a member Accademia degli Affaticati ('Academy of the Weary') in his home town of Tropea.

Some time before 1583 he was appointed Protomedico (Chief Physician) to the King (Philip II of Spain), a position which required him to license and regulate all healers, surgeons, midwives and alchemists in the kingdom. He insisted that apothecaries be prevented from preparing herbal remedies before being properly inspected, otherwise 'they make the compositions up in their own way, without fear of God or justice, and to the detriment of human bodies, which for this reason are daily made to suffer.' He apparently also worked for a time for the Prince of Bisignano. He returned to Naples in 1588 and was appointed Reader in Philosophy and Medicine at the University of Naples. He later became Professor of Medicine, and Archiater to Popes Pius V and Gregory XIII. Among his most distinguished pupils were Marco Aurelio Severino and Giovanni Battista Cavallari.

In 1608 the German medic Giovanni Custode reported to his colleague Giovanni Faber the opinion of Bongiovanni that in Rome 'doctors are princes, but in Naples they are paupers, poorly-considered and working very hard to earn anything.'

== Opinions on natural philosophy ==
One story about Buongiovanni suggests that he was firmly in the Aristotelian camp in the discussions about nature, sensation, and the order of the universe. In 1571 Telesio was debating with his student Antonio Persio the nature of light, and whether or not the Sun was hot. Buongiovanni joined the discussion, arguing it could not be hot, because it was beyond the Moon and therefore, in traditional Aristotelian cosmology, beyond the realm of the senses; Telesio argued that the Sun's rays both illuminate and heat the Earth. When the argument could not be resolved, Telesio took him out into the street in the midday sunlight and stood with him. 'Can't you feel it?' he asked, but Buongiovanni refused to accept this evidence.

== Death and legacy ==
Bongiovanni died in Naples on 5 June 1612, bequeathing part of his estate to the two sons of his brother Flaminio, Giovancola and Quinzio (junior). He also left provision for the Jesuit Colleges in Naples, Massa Lubrense and Tropea; 500 scudi for the education of twelve poor boys of his home town with the Jesuits; 500 scudi to provide dowries for widows and orphans of the same town to marry; and 500 scudi for the rector of the Jesuit College in Naples to clothe and equip impoverished scholars from out of town.
