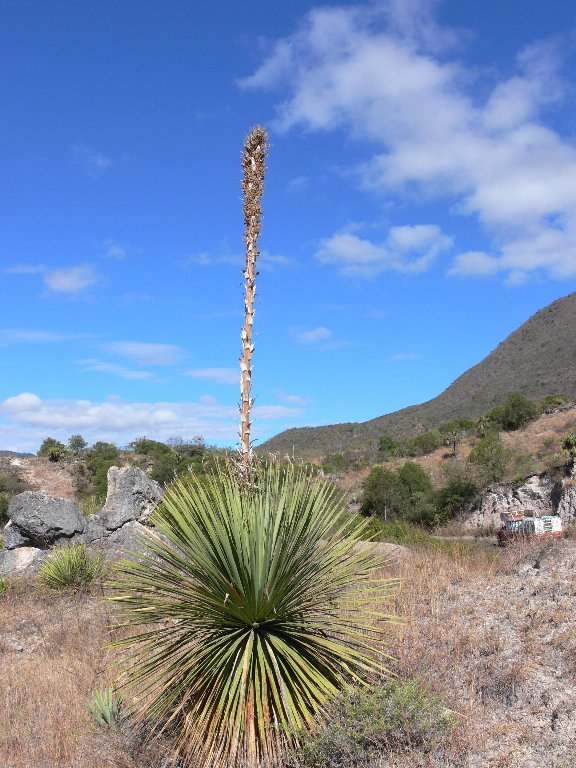

Scientific classification
- Kingdom: Plantae
- Clade: Tracheophytes
- Clade: Angiosperms
- Clade: Monocots
- Order: Asparagales
- Family: Asparagaceae
- Subfamily: Nolinoideae
- Genus: Dasylirion
- Species: D. serratifolium

Binomial name
- Dasylirion serratifolium (Karw. ex Schult. & Schult.f.) Zucc.

Synonyms
- Yucca serratifolia Karw. ex Schult. & Schult.f.; Roulinia serratifolia (Karw. ex Schult. & Schult.f.) Brongn.; Dasylirion laxiflorum Baker

= Dasylirion serratifolium =

Species of flowering plant

Dasylirion serratifolium, or the sandpaper sotol, is a plant species in the family Asparagaceae, native to the Mexican states of Hidalgo and Oaxaca. It is often in cultivation as an ornamental in other places, including in Europe.
