= Michele Mercati =

Italian physician (1541–1593)

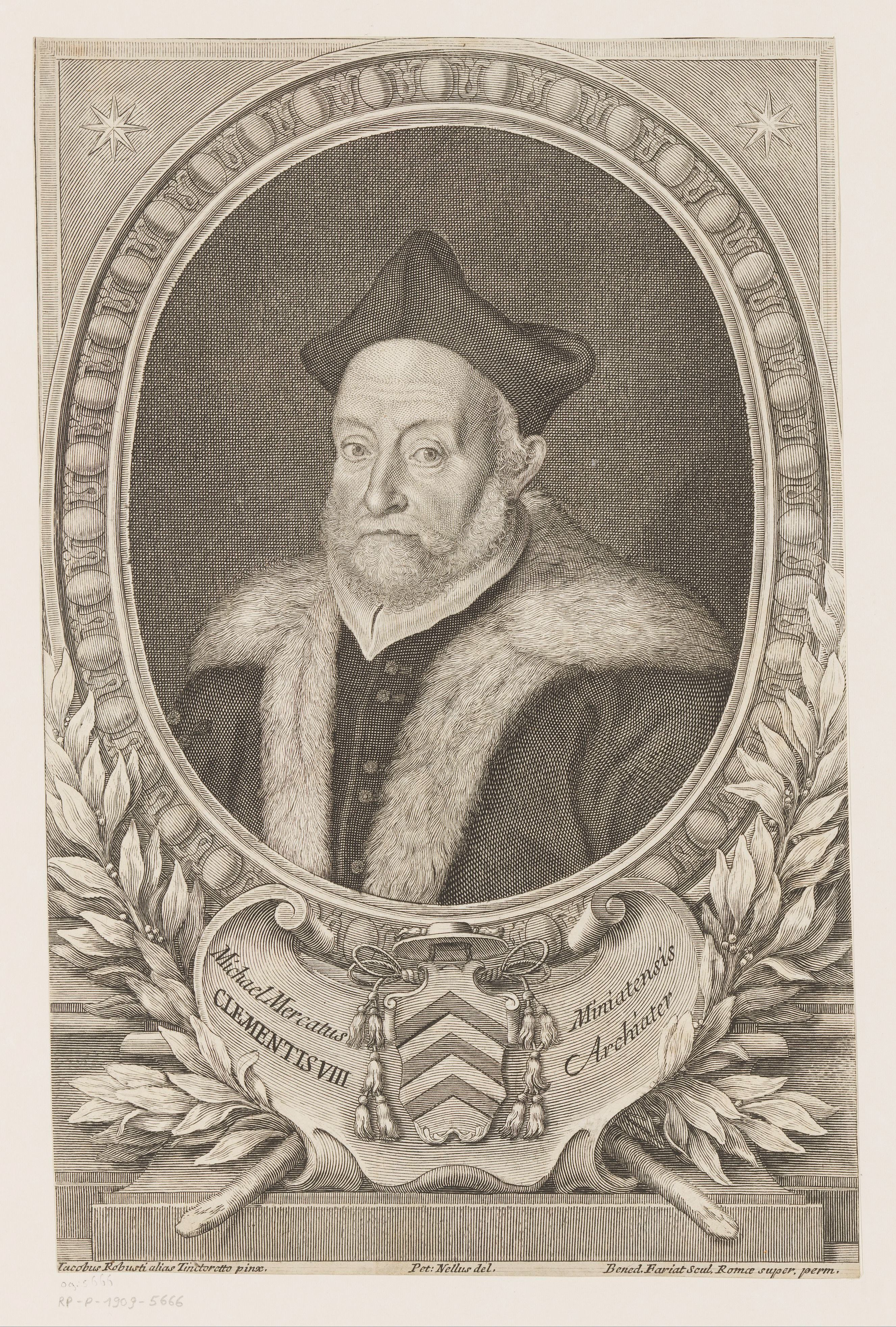
Michele Mercati

Michele Mercati (8 April 1541 – 25 June 1593) was a physician who was superintendent of the Vatican Botanical Garden under Popes Pius V, Gregory XIII, Sixtus V, and Clement VIII. He was one of the first scholars to recognise prehistoric stone tools as human-made rather than natural or mythologically created thunderstones.

== Biography ==
Mercati was born in San Miniato, Tuscany, the son of Pietro Mercati, physician to Popes Pius V and Gregory XIII. He was educated at the University of Pisa, where he took degrees in medicine and philosophy. He was interested in natural history, mineralogy, palaeontology, medicine, and botany, and produced a book on these subjects entitled the Metallotheca, which was not published until 1717.

Mercati collected curious objects - fossils, minerals and so on - as well as 'ceraunia' or 'thunderstones'. Mercati was particularly interested in Ceraunia cuneata, "wedge-shaped thunderstones," which seemed to him to be most like axes and arrowheads, which he now called ceraunia vulgaris, "folk thunderstones," distinguishing his view from the popular one. Mercati examined the surfaces of the ceraunia and noted that the stones were of flint and that they had been chipped all over by another stone. By their shapes, Mercati deduced that the stones were intended to be hafted. He then showed the similarities between the 'ceraunia' and artifacts from the New World that explorers had identified as implements or weapons.

Mercati posited that these stone tools must have been used when metal was unknown and cited Biblical passages to prove that in Biblical times stone was the first material used. He also revived the Three-age system of Lucretius, which described a succession of periods based on the use of stone (and wood), bronze and iron respectively.

== Legacy ==
Due to lateness of publication, Mercati's ideas were already being developed independently by other antiquarians, however, his writing served as a further stimulus. He was lauded shortly after publication by Antoine de Jussieu and his importance continues to be recognised. David Clarke described Mercati as "the archaeological counterpart of Cardano in mathematics, Vesalius in anatomy, Galileo in the physical sciences and Copernicus in astronomy." He is sometimes described as a polymath.
