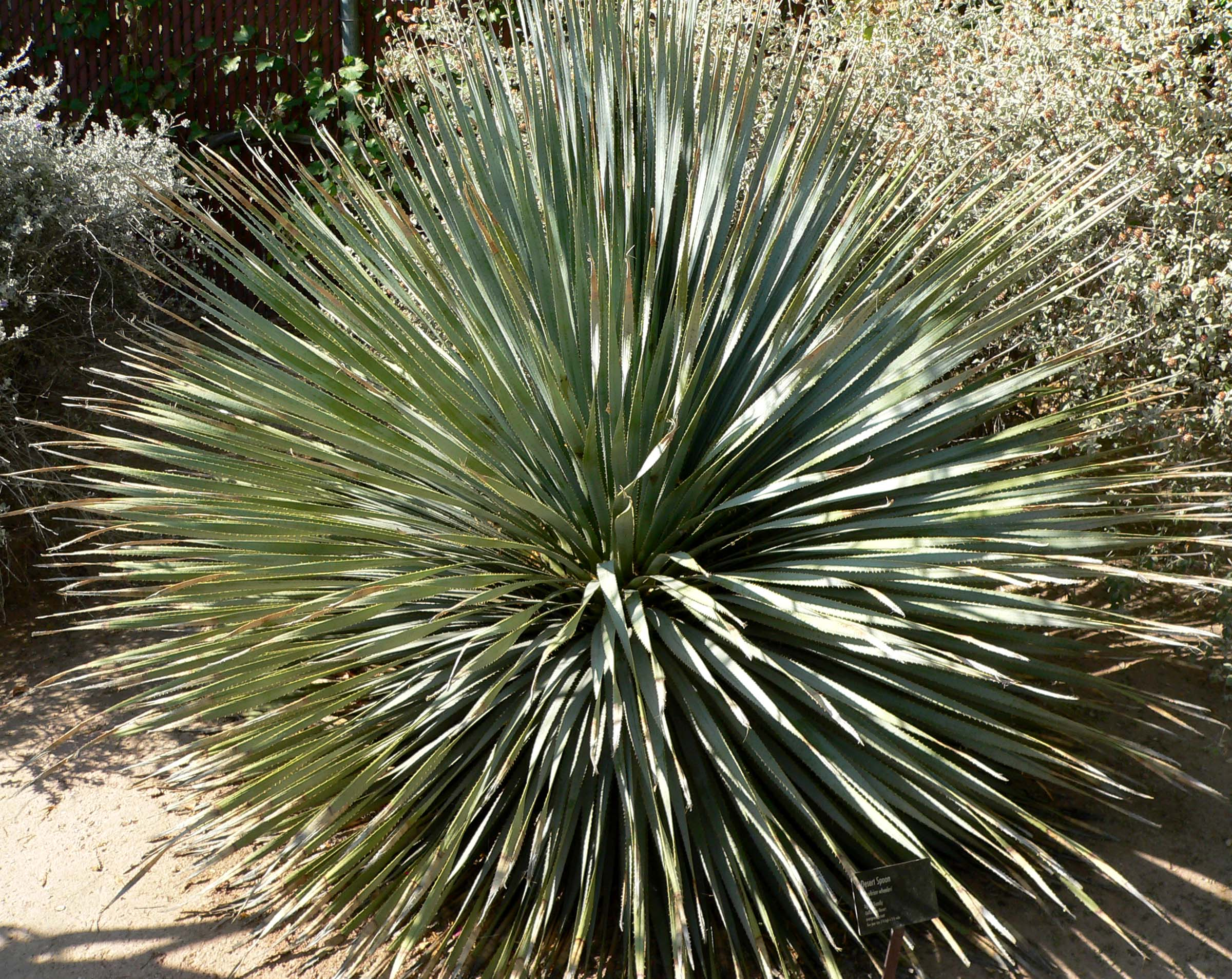

Scientific classification
- Kingdom: Plantae
- Clade: Tracheophytes
- Clade: Angiosperms
- Clade: Monocots
- Order: Asparagales
- Family: Asparagaceae
- Subfamily: Convallarioideae
- Genus: Dasylirion
- Species: D. wheeleri

Binomial name
- Dasylirion wheeleri S. Watson ex Rothrock

= Dasylirion wheeleri =

Species of flowering plant

Dasylirion wheeleri (desert spoon, spoon flower, sotol, Wheeler sotol or common sotol) is a species of flowering plant in the asparagus family (Asparagaceae), native to arid environments of northern Mexico and the southwestern United States.

== Description ==
Dasylirion wheeleri is a moderate to slow-growing evergreen shrub with a single unbranched trunk up to 40 centimetres (16 inches) thick growing to 1.5 metres (5 feet) tall, though often recumbent on the ground. The leaf blade is slender, 35–100 cm (14–39 in) long, gray-green, with a toothed margin. The leaves radiate from the center of the plant's apex in all directions (spherical).

Blooming from May to July, the flowering stem grows above the foliage, to a height of 5 m (16 ft) tall and a diameter of 3 cm (1 1/4 in). The stem is topped by a long plume of straw-colored small flowers about 2.5 cm long with six tepals. The color of the flower helps determine the gender of the plant, being mostly white for males and purple-pink for females. The fruit is an oval dry capsule 5–8 millimetres (1/4–3/8 in) long, containing a single seed.

Dasylirion leiophyllum is similar, but the toothed leaves curve towards the base.

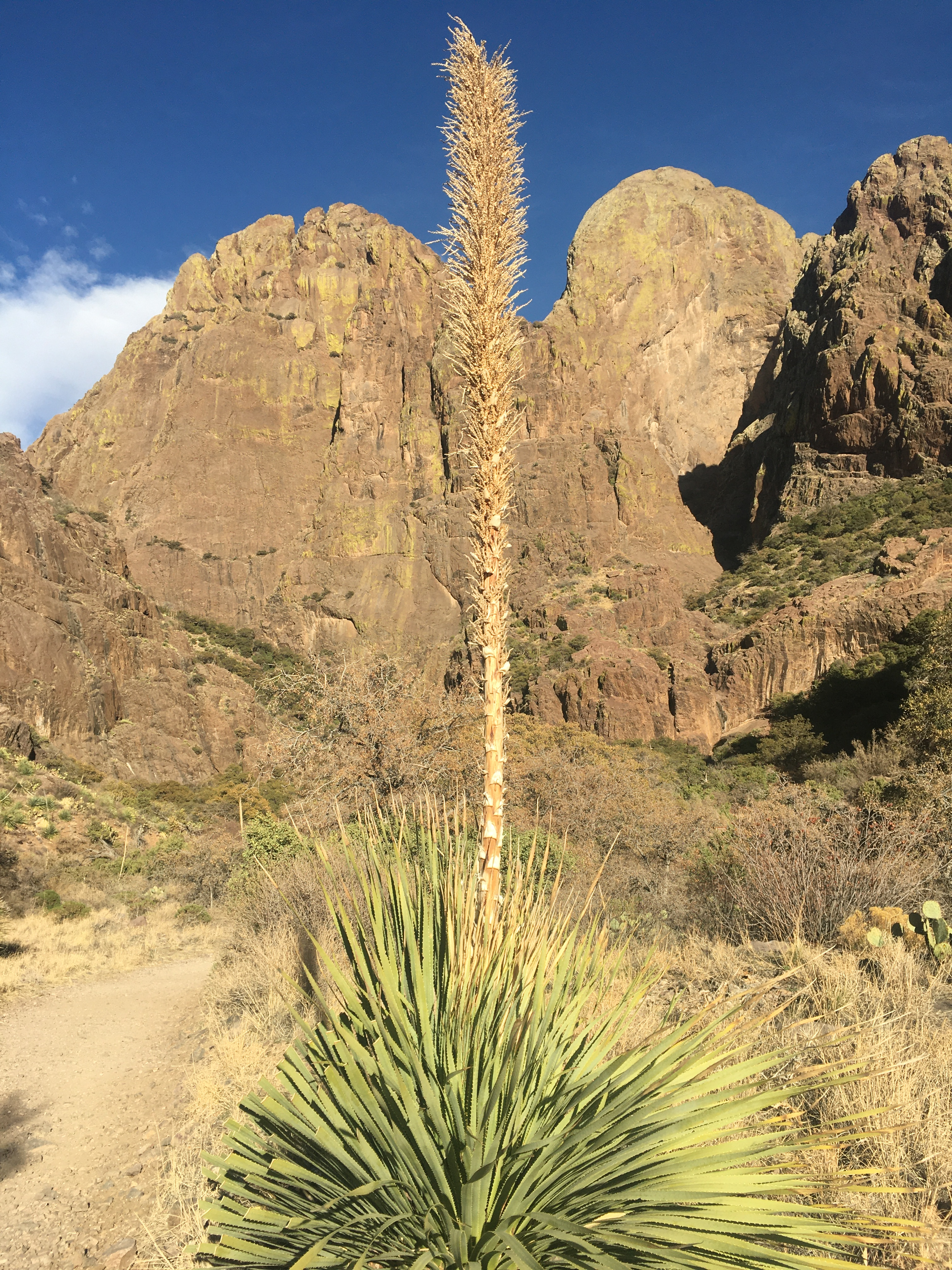
Spring flowering with a vertical stem, Organ Mountains, New Mexico

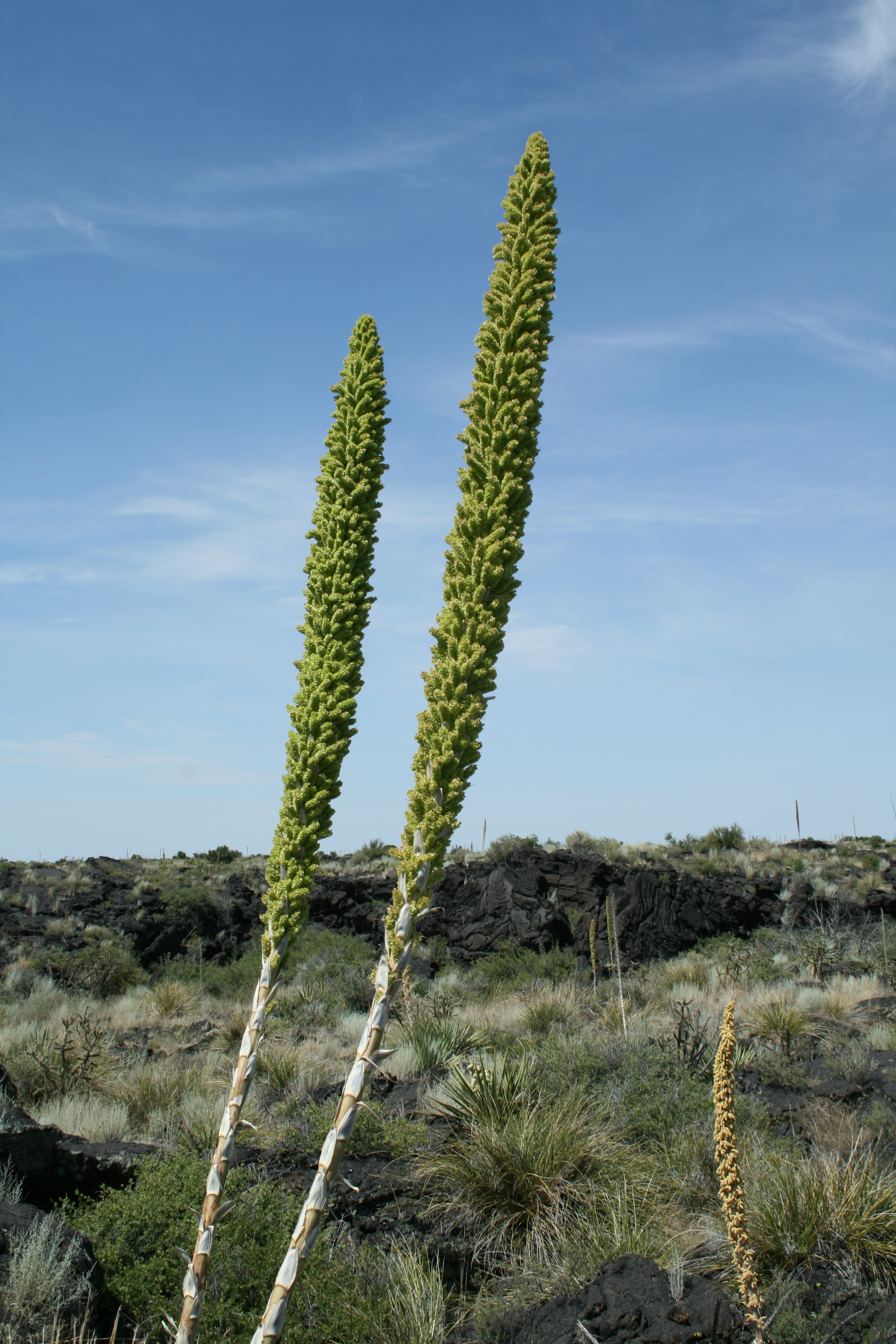
Flower stem

== Etymology ==
Dasylirion is a compound word from the Greek, literally meaning 'dense' or 'shaggy' + 'lily'. The Latin specific epithet wheeleri refers to the American surveyor and plant collector George Montague Wheeler (1842–1905).

== Distribution and habitat ==
It is native to arid, rocky environments of northern Mexico, in Chihuahua and Sonora and in the southwestern United States, in the Sonoran Desert in Arizona, and also in New Mexico and western Texas.

== Uses ==
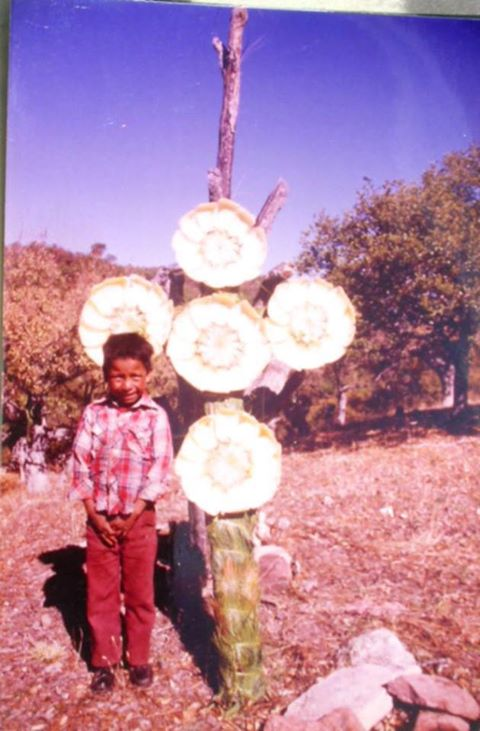
Decorative flowers made from leaf bases; Yepachi, Chihuahua

D. wheeleri is grown as an ornamental plant, valued in xeriscaping. As it does not tolerate extended frosts, in temperate regions it is usually grown under glass. It has gained the Royal Horticultural Society's Award of Garden Merit.

The alcoholic drink sotol, the northern cousin to tequila and mezcal, is made from the fermented inner cores of the plant. It is the state drink of the Mexican states of Chihuahua, Durango, and Coahuila.

It was also used by the natives of the region for food and fiber. Its flower stalk can be used as a fire plow.

The Tarahumara and Pima Bajo peoples of the Sierra Madre Occidental of Chihuahua weave baskets from the leaves after they strip off the spines from the leaf margins. They also employ the expanded leaf bases in making large artificial flowers as holiday decorations.
