= Theophilus Müller =

Theophilus Müller (also known as Teofilo Molinatore and Theophilus Molitor) (Hersfeld 1576- Würzburg 1619 (?)) was professor of botany at the University of Ingolstadt. He joined the Accademia dei Lincei in 1611.

In 1621 Theophilus Müller and Giovanni Faber performed the first documented dissection of a rat. Their pregnant specimen appeared to have a penis and testes as well as a uterus, so they described it as a hermaphrodite. In fact the supposed penis was a clitoris, and the testes were vaginal glands.

Federico Cesi had purchased the unpublished papers of the Fransicso Hernández expedition, part-edited by Nardo Antonio Recchi, containing a compendium of New World plants. There was a Lincean project to send Müller to Mexico to complete the necessary research for the publication, but nothing appears to have come of it.
