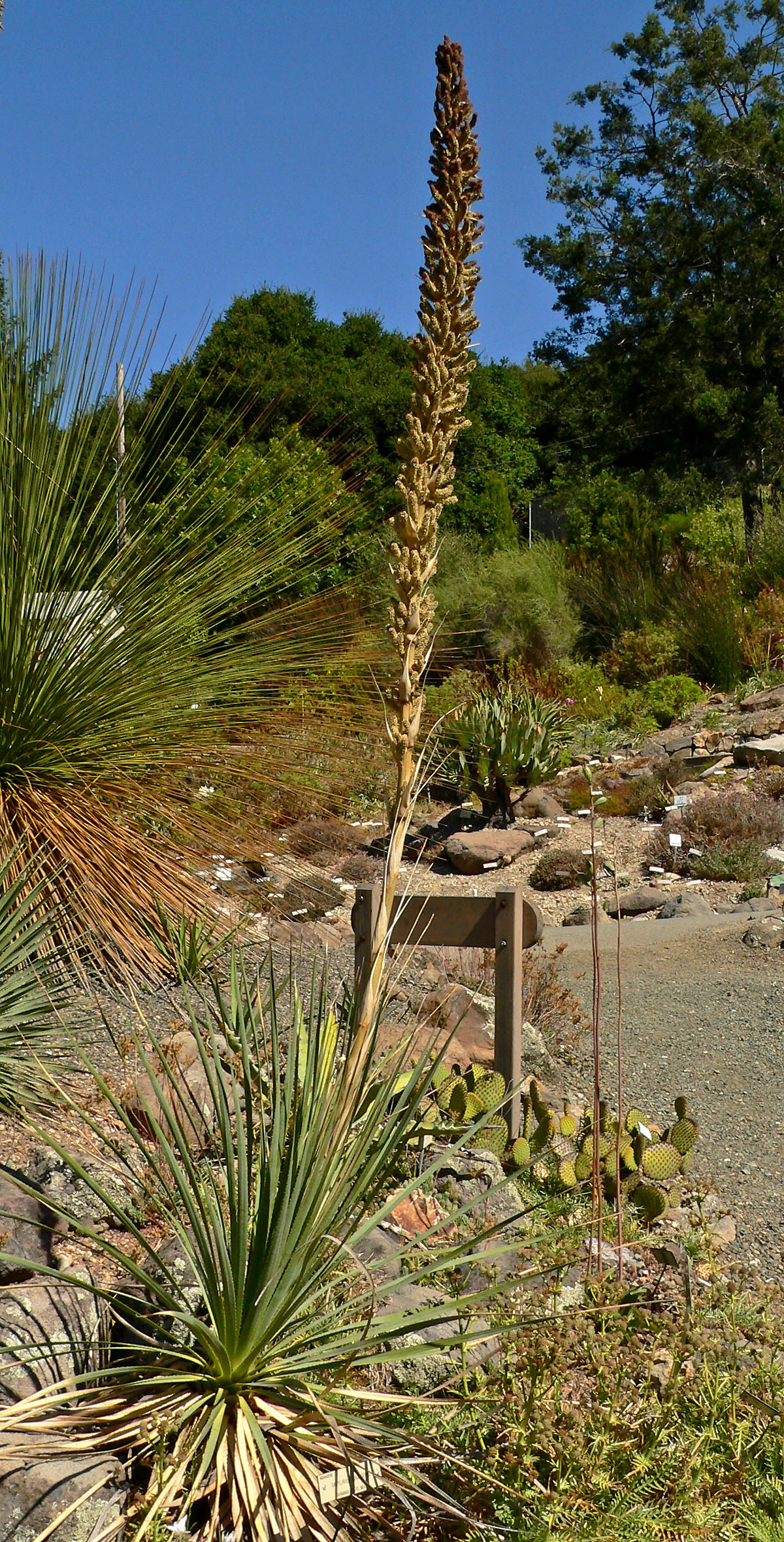

Scientific classification
- Kingdom: Plantae
- Clade: Tracheophytes
- Clade: Angiosperms
- Clade: Monocots
- Order: Asparagales
- Family: Asparagaceae
- Subfamily: Nolinoideae
- Genus: Dasylirion
- Species: D. durangense

Binomial name
- Dasylirion durangense Trel.

Synonyms
- Dasylirion wheeleri var. durangense Laferr.

= Dasylirion durangense =

Species of flowering plant

Dasylirion durangense, common name "sotol," is a perennial plant in the family Asparagaceae, native to Durango, Chihuahua and Sonora, Mexico. It is closely related to D. wheeleri S. Wats. and considered a variety of that species by some authors. The plant has a large basal rosette of long stiff leaves over 1 m in length, bearing sharp, curved spines along the margins. The flowering stalk can be up to 3 m tall, bearing small wind-pollinated flowers.

Some publications misspell the epithet as "duranguense" or "duranguensis." "Durangense" is correct.

== Uses ==
The indigenous peoples of the Sierra Madre Occidental (Tarahumara, Pima Bajo, and Tepehuan) use the sweet immature flowering stalk to produce a distilled alcoholic beverage, also called sotol. They also strip the spines off the margins of the leaves and use the leaves to make baskets, holiday decorations and other items.
