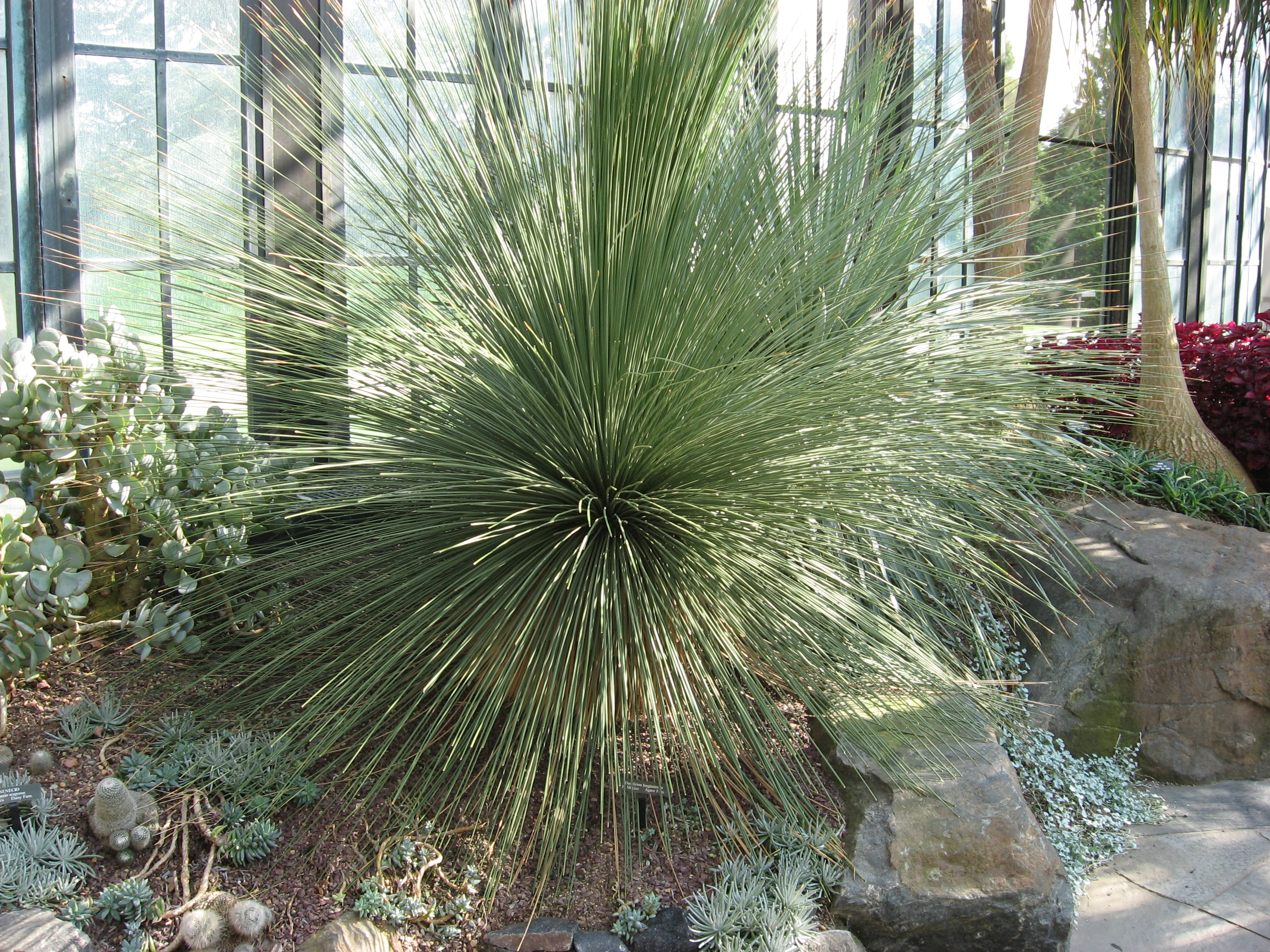

Scientific classification
- Kingdom: Plantae
- Clade: Tracheophytes
- Clade: Angiosperms
- Clade: Monocots
- Order: Asparagales
- Family: Asparagaceae
- Subfamily: Convallarioideae
- Genus: Dasylirion
- Species: D. longissimum

Binomial name
- Dasylirion longissimum Lem.

= Dasylirion longissimum =

Species of plant

Dasylirion longissimum, common name the Mexican grass tree, square-leaved sotol, or grass palm, is a species of flowering plant native to the Chihuahuan Desert and other xeric habitats in Northeastern Mexico.

== Description ==
Evergreen trunk-forming shrub, slow and moderate growing to 4 to 6 feet (1.2 to 1.8 m) tall and wide, and can be up to 12 feet (3.7 m) tall by 8 feet (2.4 m) in diameter. The long bladed leaves are up to 4 feet (1.2 m) long by 0.24 inches (6 mm) across.

== Cultivation ==
This drought-tolerant and dramatic Dasylirion is cultivated by nurseries for use in both personal gardens as well as public or corporate xeric landscapes, mainly in the Southwestern United States (from Texas west to California). It is valued for its soft and billowing, Agave-like form, which the plant has in its early life, resembling a thin- and multi-leaved agave plant. As it matures, the plant will grow a small stalk or trunk at the base with the foliage growing out of the top. D. longissimum is naturally hardy to 15 °F (−9 °C).
