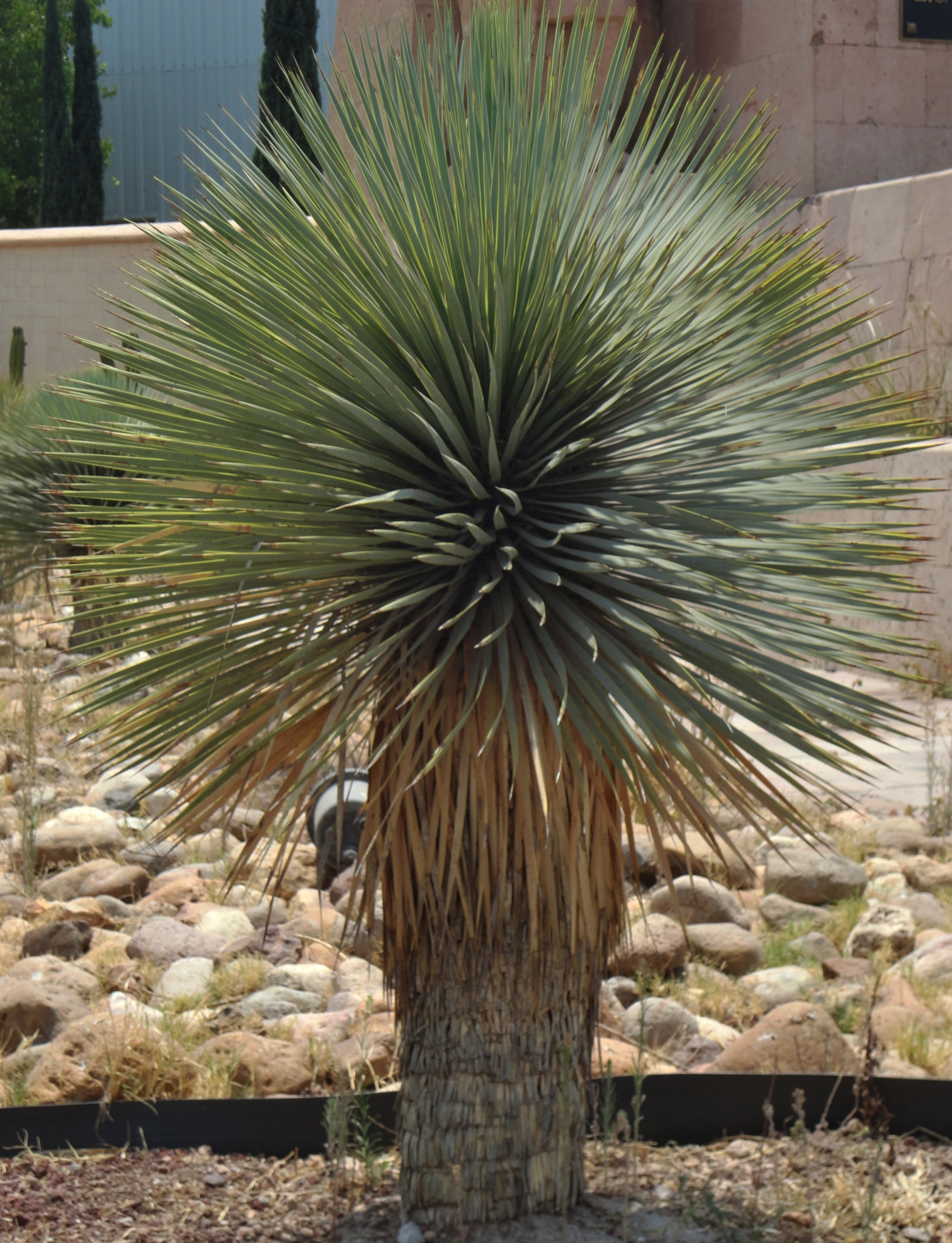
- Dasylirion parryanum

Scientific classification
- Kingdom: Plantae
- Clade: Tracheophytes
- Clade: Angiosperms
- Clade: Monocots
- Order: Asparagales
- Family: Asparagaceae
- Subfamily: Convallarioideae
- Genus: Dasylirion; Zucc.

Type species
- D. graminifolium (Zucc.) Zucc.

= Dasylirion =

Genus of flowering plants

Dasylirion is a genus of succulent, rosette-forming plants in the Asparagaceae family, where it is included in the subfamily Convallarioideae. Most species are native to mountainous arid regions of Mexico, with some species also native to the Southwestern United States. The common name sotol is used in English and Spanish to describe various Dasylirion species, as well as giving its name to a distilled spirit made from some species of the genus.

The genus name Dasylirion is a compound word coming from the Greek δασύς (dasy), meaning "dense, thick" or "shaggy" and λείριον (lirion), meaning "lily".

As of November 2024, the genus Dasylirion includes 23 accepted species.

== Description ==
Dasylirion are perennial and often long lived plants. With age, most form erect or reclining trunks that vary in height, depending on the species. The leaves blades are long-linear, evergreen and numerous, and are arranged into rosettes, living for several years and remaining persistent even after dying leading to the formation of a skirt around the plant. Some species have sharp and/or curved prickles along the leaf margins.

Similar to Agave, a genus in the same family and found in the same regions as Dasylirion, the inflorescences consist of a tall stem or "mast" ("quiote" in Mexico), which can grow several times the height of the plant, that grows apically from the center of the rosette. The flowers themselves are small and arranged in panicles at the end of the long, woody stem. Unlike most species of Agave that are monocarpic, Dasylirion are polycarpic plants, meaning they do not die after flowering and may go on to flower many more times.

Dasylirion are dioecious, with the male and female flowers on separate plants.

== Native distribution ==
All 23 accepted species of Dasylirion are native to Mexico, with the genus covering much of the country from the border with the Southwestern United States to the border of Oaxaca in the south. Across Mexico, Dasylirion species are native to 20 states, with the greatest numbers found in San Luis Potosí, followed by Chihuahua, Coahuila and Zacatecas. The typical habitat for most species are areas of transition between xerophilous shrublands and coniferous and Quercus (or oak) forests, such as the Sierra Madre Oriental pine-oak forests. The greatest diversity in the genus is concentrated in the Sierra Madre Oriental where two regions of species richness are found (in common with both being centers of endemism), the first in the Gran Sierra Plegada, and the second in the arid zone between the states of Querétaro and Hidalgo.

Three species also considered native to the Southwestern United States: Dasylirion wheeleri, commonly known as desert spoon in the USA, is native to Arizona, New Mexico, and Texas, as well as Chihuahua and Sonora in Mexico; Dasylirion texanum, native to Texas as well as Coahuila, Mexico; and Dasylirion leiophyllum, native to New Mexico, Texas, as well as Chihuahua, and Coahuila in Mexico.

== Human use ==
Dasylirion was once a major food source in the drier regions of the Southwest USA and Mexico. Native Americans would bake or roast the crown of the plant in rock-lined pits before drying and pounding to form a flour that was then made into cakes. The flowering stems can also be roasted, boiled or eaten raw.

The leaves were and are sometimes still used in thatching, basket making, and weaving into hats or mats.

=== Sotol ===
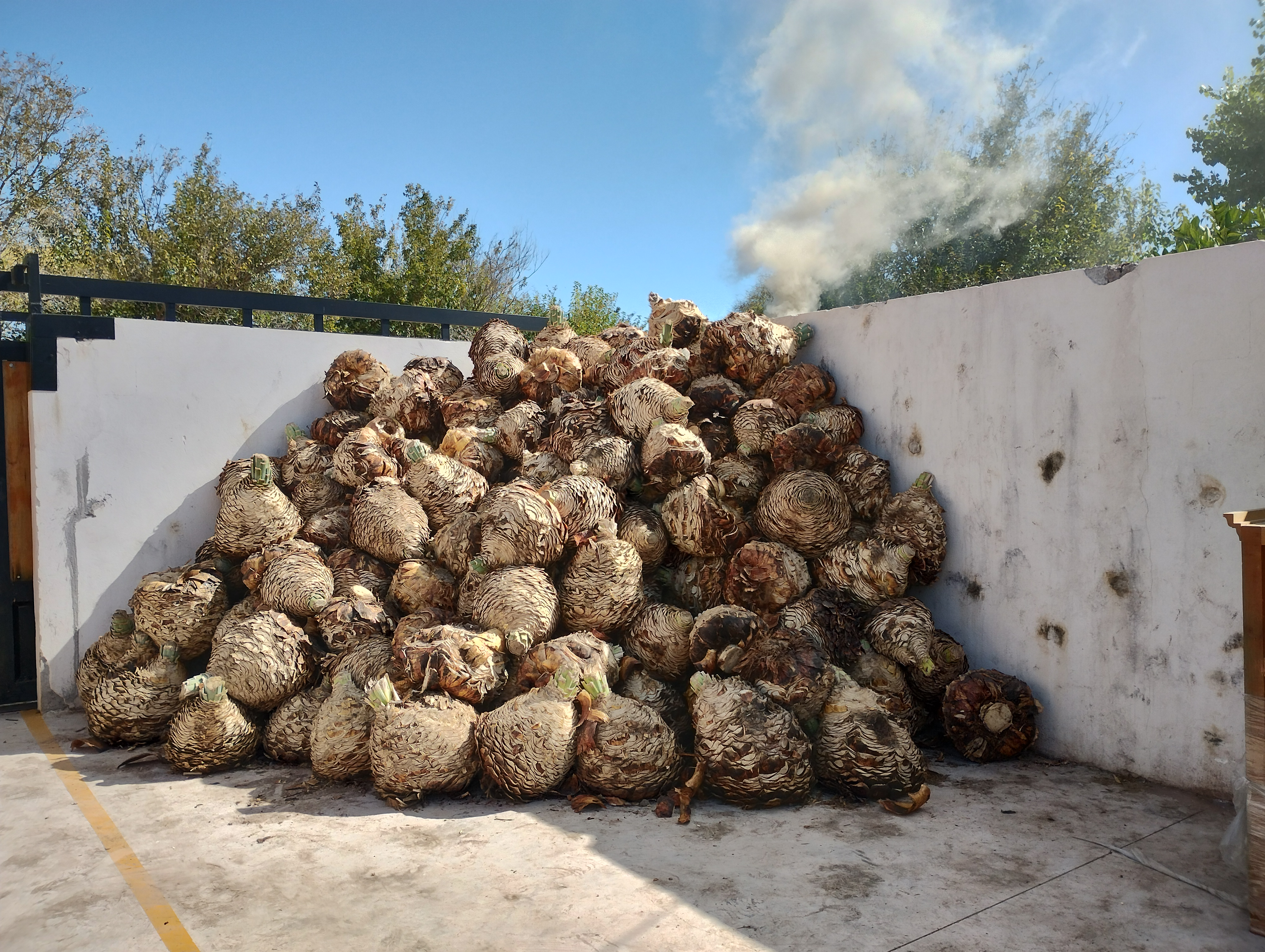
Sotol hearts being ready to roast.

Sotol is a distilled spirit produced from various species of Dasylirion. The most common species used to produce sotol are Dasylirion wheeleri, Dasylirion durangense, Dasylirion cedrosanum, and Dasylirion leiophyllum, and less commonly with Dasylirion texanum and Dasylirion lucidum.

Sotol has long been the most popular distilled spirit in the Mexican states of Chihuahua, Coahuila, and Durango, but sotol was technically illegal in Mexico until 1994. After legalization, it was granted a denomination of origin (DO) in 2002. According to the DO authorized by the Mexican Institute of Industrial Property, Sotol can only be produced in Chihuahua, Coahuila, and Durango.

The indigenous peoples of the Chihuahuan desert, such as the Jumano Pueblos and the Lipan Apache, have made this traditional drink for centuries. Other indigenous peoples of Chihuahua, such as the Rarámuri, fermented sotol juice into a beer-like alcoholic beverage as early as 800 years ago. After baking, the crown of the plant is peeled, crushed and mixed with water before being fermented.

Distillation technology was introduced in the 16th century by early Filipino immigrants who arrived via the Manila galleons to the coastal regions of western Mexico. Distinctive Filipino-type stills were initially used by Filipino coconut farmers in distilling tubâ into "vino de coco" (coconut sap liquor). This technology and the knowledge of liquor production were acquired by the indigenous peoples who worked in the coconut plantations. They were then used to distil native drinks, resulting in sotol and the similarly produced mezcal.

== Species ==
As of June 2025, the genus Dasylirion includes 23 accepted species.

Image	Scientific name	Distribution
	Dasylirion acrotrichum (Schiede) Zucc.	Hidalgo, Puebla, Jalisco
	Dasylirion berlandieri S. Wats.	Nuevo León, Tamaulipas
	Dasylirion cedrosanum Trel.	Coahuila, Durango, Zacatecas
	Dasylirion durangense Trel.	Durango, Chihuahua, Zacatecas, Coahuila
	Dasylirion gentryi Bogler	Sonora, Chihuahua
	Dasylirion glaucophyllum Hook.	Hidalgo
	Dasylirion graminifolium (Zucc.) Zucc.	Aguascalientes, Jalisco, Zacatecas
	Dasylirion leiophyllum Engelm. ex Trel. (syn. D. heteracanthum I.M.Johnst.)	Chihuahua, Coahuila; Texas, New Mexico
	Dasylirion longissimum Lem.	San Luis Potosí, Hidalgo
	Dasylirion longistylum J.F.Macbr.	San Luis Potosí
	Dasylirion lucidum Rose	Oaxaca, Puebla
	Dasylirion micropterum Villarreal, A.E.Estrada & Encina	Coahuila
	Dasylirion miquihuanense Bogler	Nuevo León, Tamaulipas
	Dasylirion occidentalis Bogler ex Hochstätter	Aguascalientes
	Dasylirion palaciosii Rzed.	San Luis Potosí
	Dasylirion parryanum Trel.	San Luis Potosí
	Dasylirion quadrangulatum S.Watson	Nuevo León, Tamaulipas
	Dasylirion sereke Bogler	Chihuahua
	Dasylirion serratifolium (Karw. ex Schult. & Schult.f.) Zucc.	Oaxaca
	Dasylirion simplex Trel.	Durango
	Dasylirion texanum Scheele	Coahuila & Texas
	Dasylirion treleasei (Bogler) Hochstätter	Hidalgo, San Luis Potosí
	Dasylirion wheeleri S.Watson ex Rothr.	Arizona, New Mexico, Texas; Chihuahua, Sonora

== Formerly placed here ==
- Nolina bigelovii (Torr.) S.Watson (as D. bigelovii Torr.)
