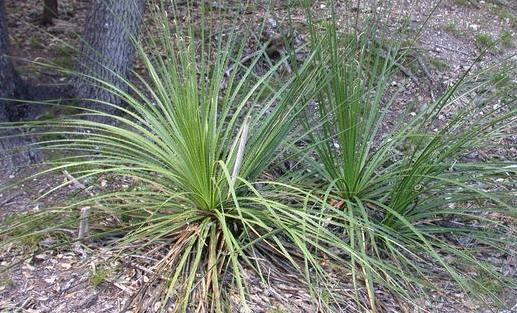

Scientific classification
- Kingdom: Plantae
- Clade: Tracheophytes
- Clade: Angiosperms
- Clade: Monocots
- Order: Asparagales
- Family: Asparagaceae
- Subfamily: Nolinoideae
- Genus: Dasylirion
- Species: D. texanum

Binomial name
- Dasylirion texanum Scheele

= Dasylirion texanum =

Species of flowering plant

Dasylirion texanum, the Texas sotol and sotol, is a monocot flowering plant native to central and southwestern Texas and in Coahuila state of northeastern Mexico, including the Chihuahuan Desert.

== Description ==
The grass-like plant is typically smaller than other Dasylirions, with small crowns and trunks usually less than 1.5 feet, with long foliage reaching 3–6 ft.

== Uses ==
=== Food ===
Indigenous peoples of the region pit-bake the crowns to dry and pound them into flour in order to make bread.

=== Spirits ===
The alcoholic drink sotol, is made from the fermented inner cores of the desert spoon. It has been produced historically in West Texas and currently in Central Texas using the Dasylirion texanum species.

=== Cultivation ===
Dasylirion texanum is cultivated in by specialty plant nurseries and available as an ornamental plant for native plant, drought tolerant, natural landscape, and habitat gardens; and for ecological restoration projects.
