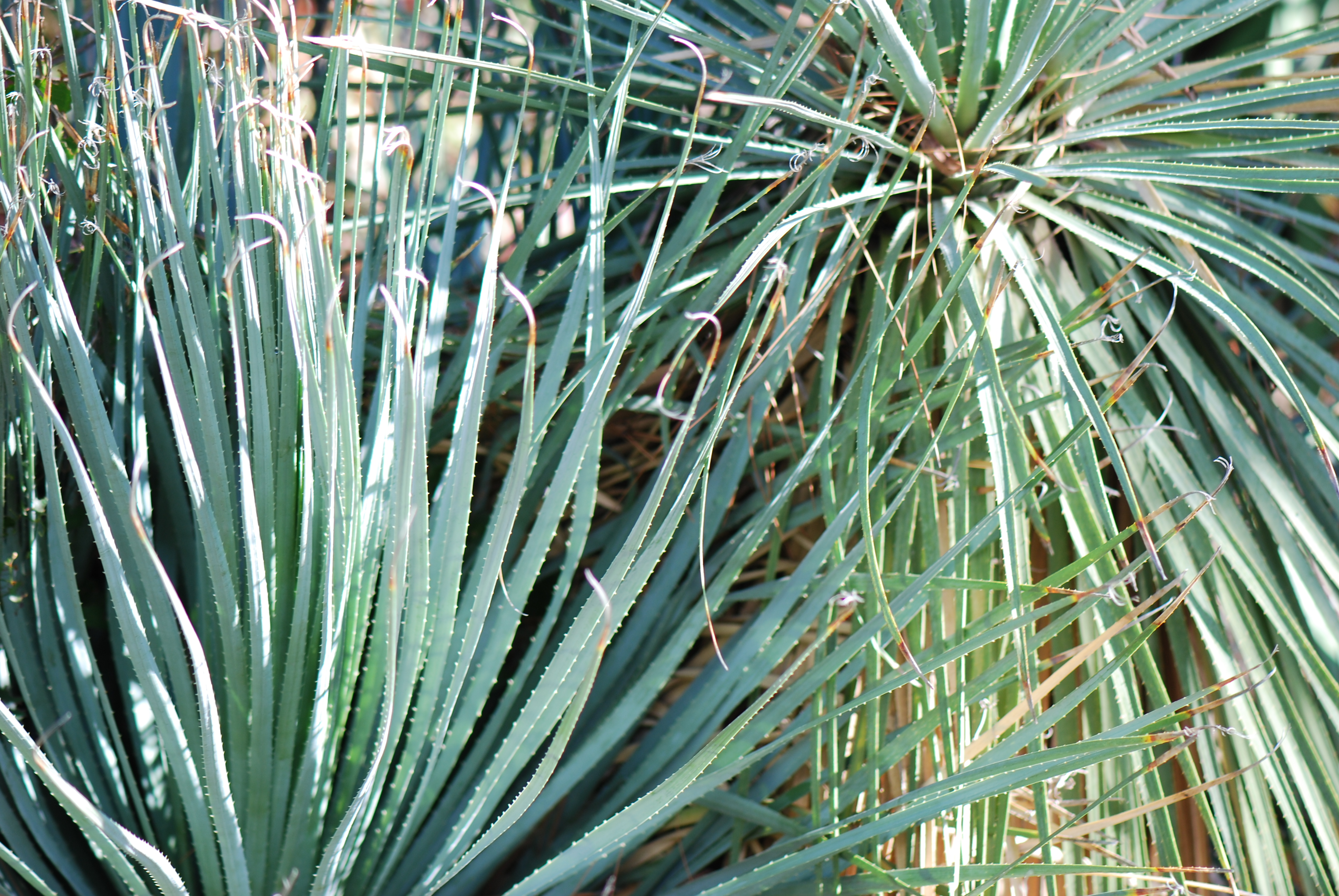

Scientific classification
- Kingdom: Plantae
- Clade: Tracheophytes
- Clade: Angiosperms
- Clade: Monocots
- Order: Asparagales
- Family: Asparagaceae
- Subfamily: Nolinoideae
- Genus: Dasylirion
- Species: D. acrotrichum

Binomial name
- Dasylirion acrotrichum (Schiede) Zucc.

Synonyms
- Yucca acrotricha Schiede; Roulinia acrotricha (Schiede) Brongn.; Dasylirion gracile (Brongn.) Zucc.; Barbacenia gracilis (Brongn.) Baker; Bonapartea gracilis Sweet [Invalid]; Dasylirion graminifolium S.Watson [Illegitimate]; Dasylirion robustum Gorl. ex Trel.; Roulinia acrotricha (Schiede) Brongn.; Roulinia gracilis Brongn.

= Dasylirion acrotrichum =

Species of flowering plant

Dasylirion acrotrichum, the great desert spoon and green sotol (also, spoon yucca, though not a true Yucca), is a plant native to the Chihuahuan Desert and other xeric habitats in northern and central Mexico.

== Description ==
The foliage is firm narrow bladed leaves up to 40 inches (1.0 m) long, grasslike and 0.4 inches (1.0 cm) across, symmetrically radiating in a rosette, 6 feet (1.8 m) tall by the same in diameter, from a central core that elongates into decumbent trunks. The mid Summer flower spike of small white flowers is 6 to 15 feet (1.8 to 4.6 metres) tall.

== Cultivation ==
The drought-tolerant and dramatic plant is cultivated by nurseries for use in personal gardens and larger xeriscape landscape projects in the Southwestern United States and California. Dasylirion acrotrichum is hardy to 20 °F (−7 °C)
