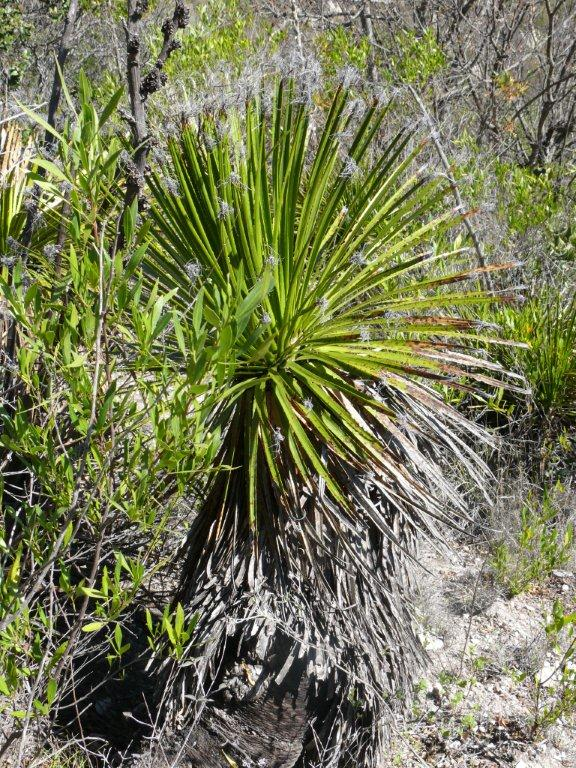

Scientific classification
- Kingdom: Plantae
- Clade: Tracheophytes
- Clade: Angiosperms
- Clade: Monocots
- Order: Asparagales
- Family: Asparagaceae
- Subfamily: Convallarioideae
- Genus: Dasylirion
- Species: D. lucidum

Binomial name
- Dasylirion lucidum Rose

= Dasylirion lucidum =

Species of flowering plant

Dasylirion lucidum is a plant in the family Asparagaceae, native to the Mexican states of Oaxaca and Puebla. This is a shrub up to 2 m high, with thin, spiny-margined leaves and a scape up to 3 m tall.
