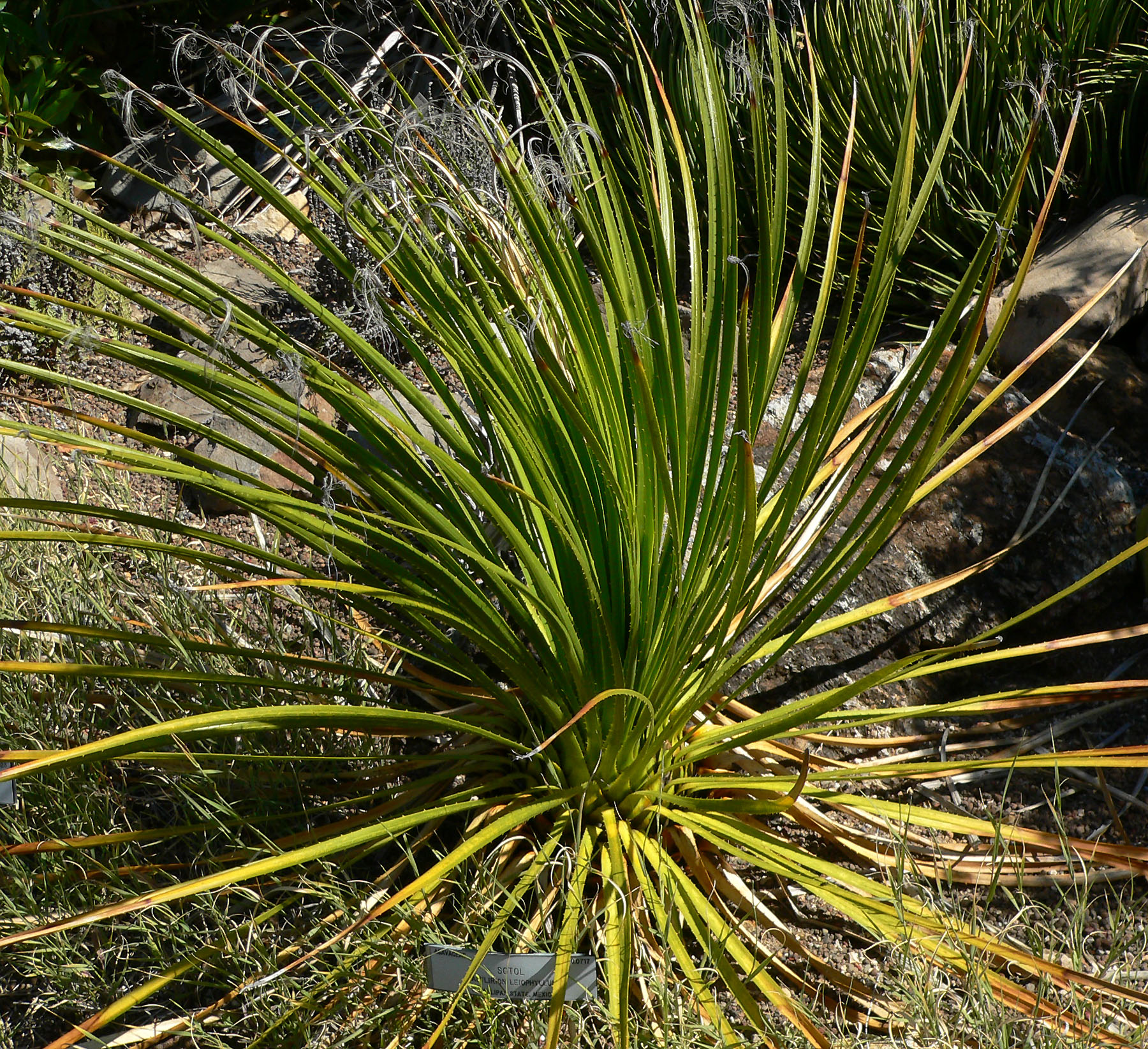

Conservation status
- Secure (NatureServe)

Scientific classification
- Kingdom: Plantae
- Clade: Tracheophytes
- Clade: Angiosperms
- Clade: Monocots
- Order: Asparagales
- Family: Asparagaceae
- Subfamily: Convallarioideae
- Genus: Dasylirion
- Species: D. leiophyllum

Binomial name
- Dasylirion leiophyllum Engelm. ex Trel.

Synonyms
- Dasylirion stewartii I.M.Johnst.; Dasylirion stewartii var. glaucum I.M.Johnst.

= Dasylirion leiophyllum =

Species of flowering plant

Dasylirion leiophyllum is a species of flowering plant in the asparagus family known by the common names green sotol, smooth-leaf sotol, and smooth sotol. It is native to North America, where it occurs in Chihuahua and Coahuila in Mexico and New Mexico and western Texas in the United States. It was first collected by Valery Havard in 1880 and was described by William Trelease in 1911.

This plant is a succulent shrub with a trunk up to a meter long growing erect or reclining. The shiny, bright green, fibrous leaves are narrow, long, and pointed, growing up to 80 centimeters long by 2.5 wide. The margins have prickles. Mature specimens may wear a sheath of dead leaves from previous seasons around the trunk. The inflorescence is about 30 centimeters long and is borne atop a stalk which can reach five meters in height. The species is dioecious, with male and female reproductive structures on separate individuals. The many tiny flowers have whitish or greenish tepals about 2 millimeters in length. The fruit is a three-winged capsule under a centimeter in length. The plants reproduce by seed and vegetatively by sprouting from buds located at the leaf bases.

This plant is native to the Chihuahuan Desert where it is dominant in a number of plant communities, often occurring with lechuguilla and walnut. It grows in woodlands and desert grasslands, often on calcareous substrates, and generally only in dry areas. Other plant species in the habitat may include prickly pear, yucca, nolina, Pinchot juniper, wavyleaf oak, skeleton goldeye, curlyleaf muhly, grama grasses, threeawns, and slim tridens.

Mature individuals of this species can ignite and burn for hours if hit by lightning. Fire can then spread through the habitat if the burning top of the plant falls off and rolls down a hill. After the plant burns it can sometimes resprout from the buds at the leaf bases.

In Mexico, species within the Dasylirion genus are used to make a liquor known as "sotol".

Trunks contain a lot of starch and this material is roasted, fermented and distilled to produce this liquor. Similar to "tequila", this liquor product is historically only referred to or labeled as "sotol", if it originates within certain regions of Mexico --- a tradition officially recognized by the Mexican government when it granted the spirit a denomination of origin (DO) which the US begin honoring under the North America Free Trade Agreement. This has become a controversial subject in recent years after two companies in Texas began producing liquor from Dasylirion species harvested on private ranches in Texas after lobbyists were able to remove protections for Mexican sotol producers from international trade agreements during last minute renegotiations with the support of a senator from Texas.
