= Marco Aurelio Severino =

Italian surgeon and anatomist (1580–1656)

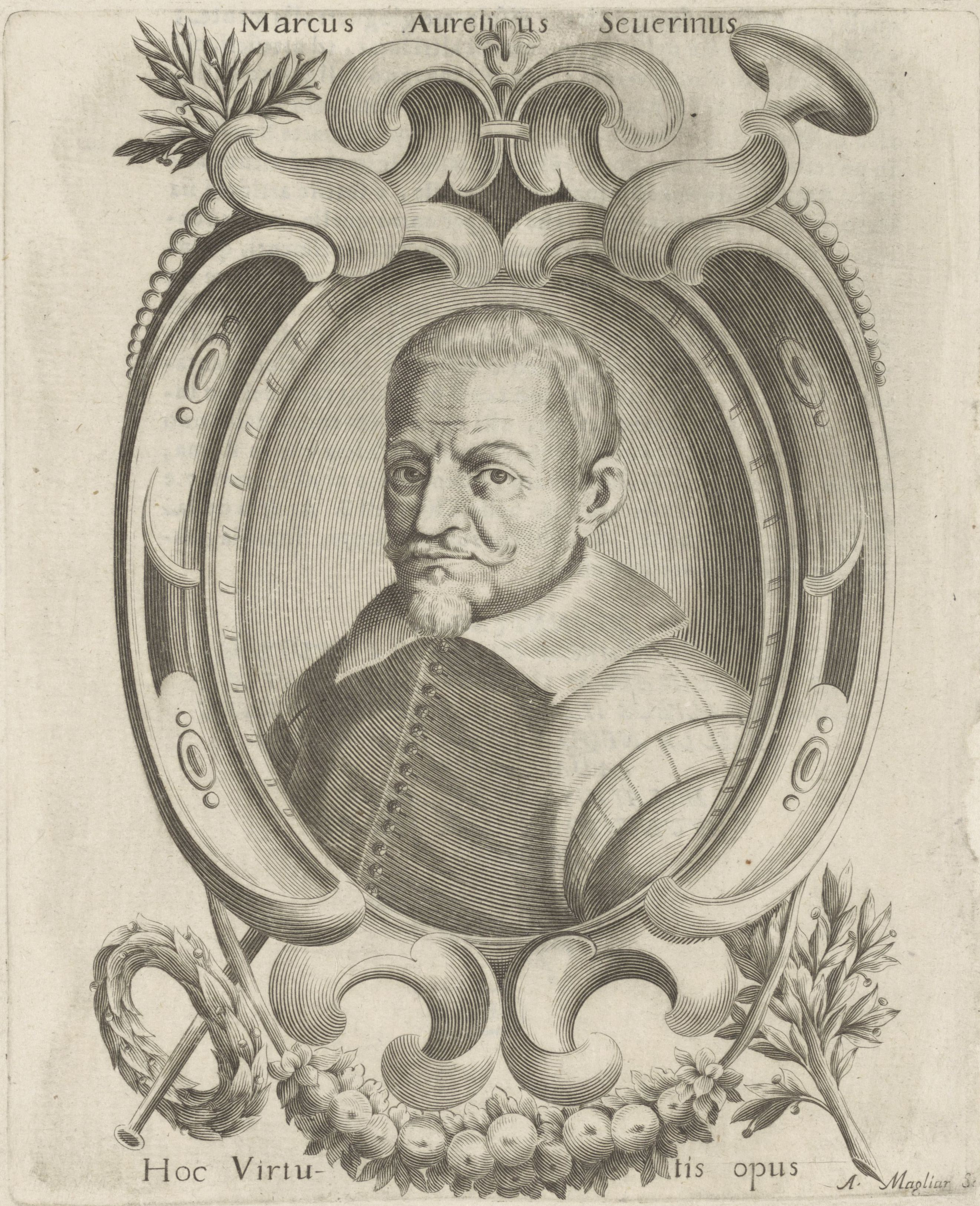
Marco Aurelio Severino

Marco Aurelio Severino (November, 1580 – July 12, 1656) was an Italian surgeon and anatomist.

== Biography ==
Severino was born in Tarsia (Calabria, Italy), of Giovanni Jacopo Severino, a lawyer. He died in a 1656 epidemic of plague in Naples.

Adept of the atomist views of Democritus, he disregarded Aristotle. He met Tommaso Campanella and corresponded with William Harvey and Thomas Bartholin. He was familiar of the works of scientists of the antiquity like Galen and Lactantius.

He also was the author of a book called The philosophy of chess (La filosofia degli scacchi).

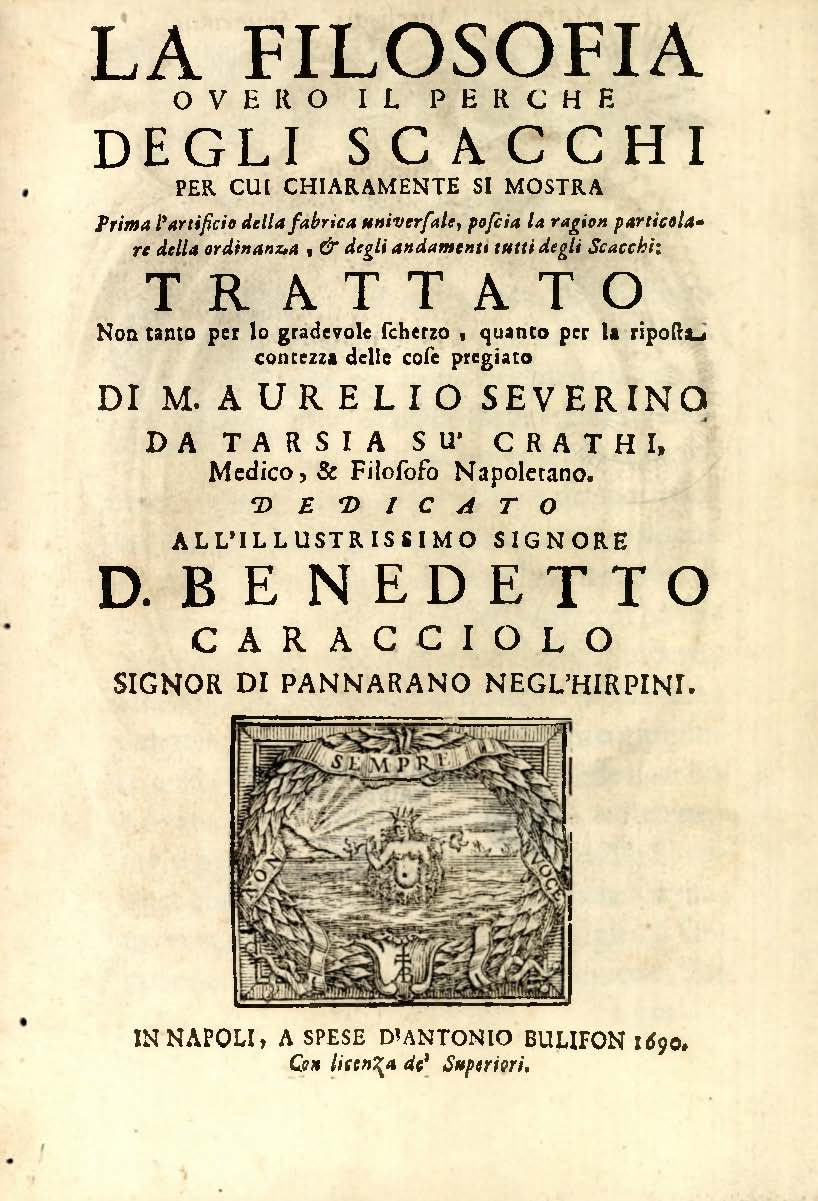
La filosofia overo il perche degli scacchi, 1690

== Controversy ==
Besides his brilliant career as a surgeon and professor, his works present an ambiguous aspect. He includes mystic speculations, and his work attempts to coincide with his religious beliefs.

== Selected works ==
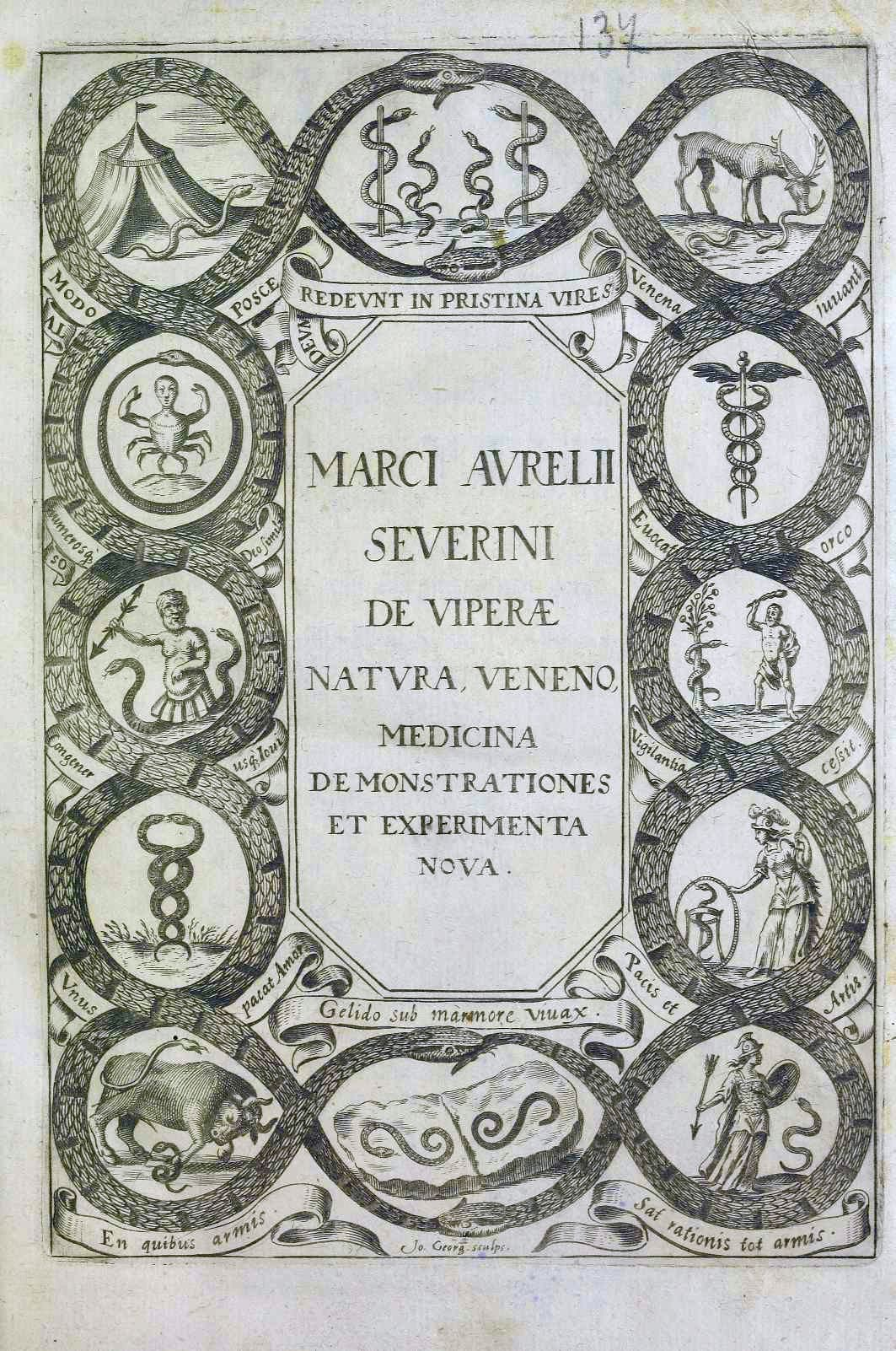
Vipera Pythia, 1651

- De recondita abscessuum natura, O. Beltrani, Naples, 1632
  - De recondita abscessuum natura libri VIII, p. PP5, at Google Books. Frankfurt, 1643
- Zootomia democritaea, id est anatome generalis totius animantium opificii : libris quinque distincta, quorum seriem sequens facies delineabit. Nuremberg, 1645, in-40, 455 p.
- De efficaci medicina libri tres, p. PR3-IA3, at Google Books, Frankfurt, 1646
- De viperae natura, veneno, medicina demonstrationes et experimenta nova, P. Frambotti, Padua, 1650
- Vipera Pythia (in Latin). Padova: Paolo Frambotto. 1651.
- Trimembris chirurgia, Schönwetter, Frankfort, 1653
- Therapeuta neapolitanus, p. PP13, at Google Books, Naples, 1653 (With a commentary by Thomas Bartholin)
- Quaestiones anatomicae quatuor, Frankfort, 1654
- Antiperipatias. Hoc est adversus Aristoteleos de respiratione piscium diatriba. De piscibus in sicco viventibus commentarius... Phoca illustratus..., 2 vol., Naples, H. C. Cavalli, 1655–1659 (Includes a short biography)
- Synopseos chirurgiae libri sex, E. Weyerstroten, Amsterdam, 1664

=== Lists of works ===
Severino gave us a list of his printed works and manuscripts, which is made up of nine parts and extends on four pages. It can be found in a 1653 edition Therapeuta Neapolitanus : Nomenclator meletematum et diatribarum Severini, p. PP29, at Google Books.

This list can also be consulted on http://gso.gbv.de/
