= List of pre-Columbian inventions and innovations of Indigenous Americans =

This is an alphabetic list of Pre-columbian achievements in science and technology made by the Indigenous peoples of the Americas during the 15,000 years that they have inhabited the Americas.

== A ==
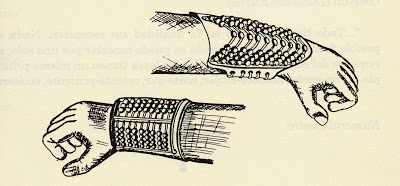
An illustration of the Pre-Columbian abacus: the Nepohualtzintzin

- Abacus – The Aztec and Maya of Mesoamerica performed arithmetic operations using an abacus. It served as a more accurate and faster alternative to a written solution or relying on memory. Archaeologists have recorded the Mesoamerican abacus, or Nepohualtzintzin, as being present in Mesoamerica from at least between 900 and 1000 CE.
- Abstract art – Abstract art was used by nearly all societies of North and South America. Members of European art world believed tribal art was "primitive" until the 1890s when it served as inspiration for the modern American abstract art movement. See also Visual arts by indigenous peoples of the Americas.

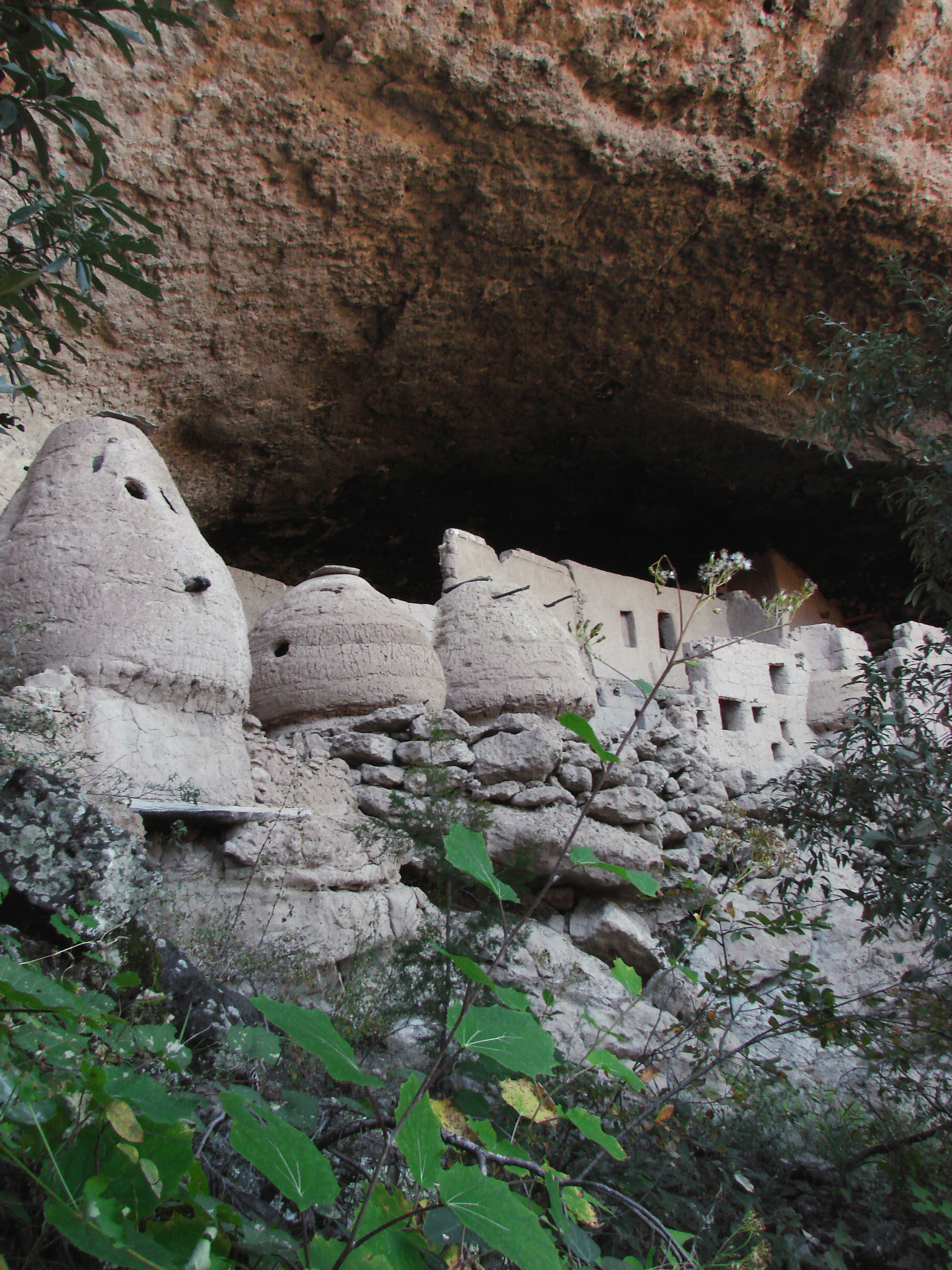
Adobe buildings at Cuarenta Casas

- Adobe – Adobe was used by the peoples from South America, Mesoamerica, and up to Southwestern tribes of the U.S. It is estimated that it was developed around the year 3000 BCE.
- Alcoholic beverages - Several fermented beverages were produced by Native Americans, such as Pulque, Tepache, Agave wine and Cauim. Some of these beverages have gained popularity in modern times, particularly in Mexico.
- Almanacs – Almanacs were invented independently by the Maya peoples. Their culture arose, and presumably began using almanacs, around 3,500 years ago, while Europeans are known to have created written almanacs only after 1150 CE. Almanacs are books containing meteorological and astronomical information, which the Maya used in various aspects of their life.
- Alpacas – Alpacas were domesticated from wild vicuñas approximately 5,000–6,000 years ago in the highlands of the Peruvian Andes near Lake Titicaca.
- Ammassalik wooden maps – The Greenlandic Inuit carved wooden maps that represented coastlines.
- American football – The Iroquois claim to have played football. While no specification is made as to whether this is meant to be American football or soccer, soccer's invention in England in the 1800s is a recent and well documented occurrence.
- Anesthetics – Indigenous peoples used coca, peyote, datura and other plants for partial or total loss of sensation or consciousness during surgery. Western doctors had effective anesthetics only after the mid-19th century. Before this, they either had to perform surgery while the patient dealt with the pain, intoxicated, or they needed to knock the patient out unconscious.
- Apartment blocks – The Ancestral Pueblo people and other tribes which once thrived in the present day Southwest of the US, developed complex multistory apartment complexes, some of which are still in use today. Pueblo communities in present-day New Mexico continue to reside in some of these ancient multistory apartment complexes–which were constructed by their ancestors many centuries ago–even before the first apartments were built in the United States during the 18th century. Pueblo Bonito, one of the seminal archaeological sites today, is an example of this indigenous multistory apartment complex construction from the Anasazi and Hohokam time periods; approximately dating back one thousand years ago.

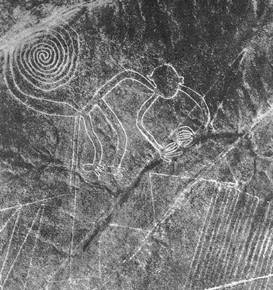
Nazca monkey

- Art to be viewed from space – The Nazca Lines were created by the ancient Nazca culture in modern-day Peru. The Nazca built these artworks, which could only be viewed from the sky or from space. It was as if the Nazca were building monuments, which only their gods could view from up in the sky. Some of these artworks, otherwise known as the Nazca Lines, could only be viewed from the sky and each one of these works of Nazca art spans several miles across in size and dimension in the Sechura Desert.
- Aqueducts – The ancient Andean cultures, such as Chimu, Moche and Nazca, lived in dry environments, yet they sustained large scale agriculture consisting of a wide variety of crops by employing aqueducts connecting various freshwater sources, such as mountain streams and lakes to their agricultural fields which were sometimes injecting pressure with the aid of puquios (wind-based water pumps). The Inca later expanded on these previously constructed aqueducts and built a more complex and large aqueduct system in the Inca Empire. The Mesoamerican Aztecs also constructed complex, dual-pipe aqueducts to supply their vast city of Tenochtitlan.
- Aspirin – Indigenous Americans have been using willow tree bark for thousands of years to reduce fever and pain as were the peoples of Assyria, Sumer, Ancient Egypt and Ancient Greece. When chemists analyzed willows in the last century, they discovered salicylic acid; the basis of the modern drug aspirin.
- Asymmetric warfare – Araucanian leaders such as Lautaro developed effective military tactics to counter the Spanish invasion, winning the Arauco War. These tactics consisted in a combination of espionage, cattle raiding, and using attack waves in the battlefield to exhaust the enemy.
- Astronomy – Mesoamerican cultures, such as the Maya and Aztec, were able to accurately predict astronomical events, like eclipses, hundreds of years into the future.
- Atlatl – Paleo-Indians (Beringian Diaspora) from over 11,500 years ago had developed a highly developed spear thrower in the form of the atlatl to hunt woolly mammoths, giant sloths, mastodon, muskox (euceratherium), giant beaver, early caribou, steppe bison, saber-toothed cat, and other Pleistocene animals. Using the atlatl, these ancient Paleo-Indians were able to traverse much of the Americas from Alaska, down to Mexico, Central America, South America, and, finally, all the way south into Chile as they hunted and followed these Pleistocene megafauna within a short 3,000 year time period–from about 14,500 years ago to about 11,500 years ago.
- Avocado – Indigenous Americans were the first to domesticate and cultivate avocados.

== B ==
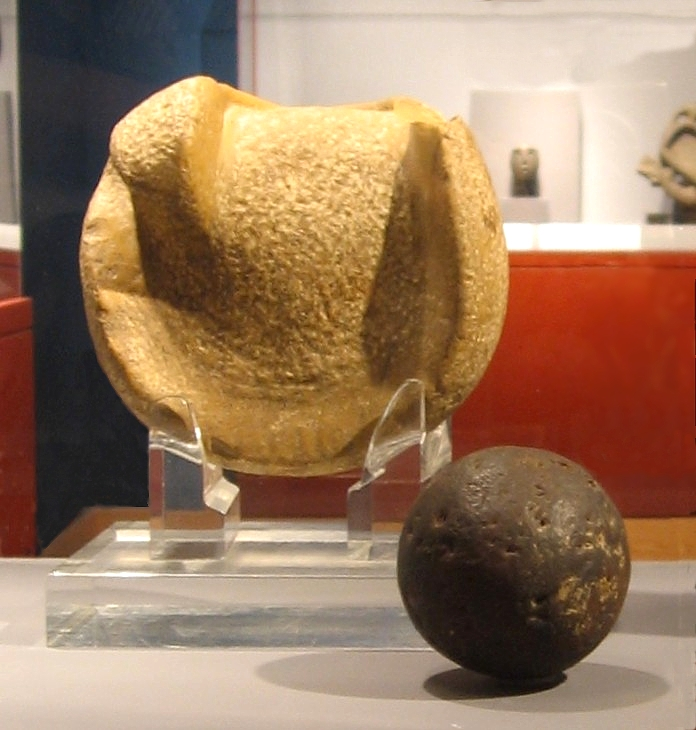
Solid rubber ball

- Balls, rubber – the Olmec produced rubber balls around 1700 BCE. They were the first people to develop and play with rubber balls as well as manufacture other objects of rubber.
- Baby bottle – Indigenous people's used the stomach of large prey and would attach a quill on the end to act as a nipple creating a type of baby bottle.
- Beans – most commonly eaten beans today were originally cultivated in the Americas by indigenous Americans. Beans (Phaseolus), along with squash and maize, formed the "Three Sister (crops)" which were grown by many pre-Columbian American cultures, tribes, nations, and civilizations.
- Board games – various indigenous cultures had board games, among these can be found: Komikan (South America), Patolli (Mesoamerica), Tukvnanawopi (Hopi culture), etc.
- Bolas – bolas are a type of throwing weapon made of weights on the ends of interconnected cords and were initially used to capture animals via the entanglement of their legs. Bolas were used in the Andes and Patagonia where indigenous peoples–particularly the Tehuelche–used them to catch 200-pound guanaco and ñandú.
- Bottle gourds – the ancient Mexicans learned to first cultivate bottle gourds around 8,000 BCE. Indigenous peoples grew bottle gourds for use as bowls, scoops, colanders, ladles, spoons, canteens, and dippers. Larger gourds were used as cooking vessels. The indigenous peoples of the Eastern Woodlands hung bottle gourds on poles in their cornfields to serve as habitats for insect-eating birds (a form of biological pest control, which they developed). Indigenous Americans in northern Peru also used bottle gourds as floats for fishing nets.
- Bulletproof vest – Ichcahuipilli, was a military armor used by various Mesoamerican cultures. It consisted of a layered cotton shirt, at least 2 inches thick, hardened with brine and other substances. It was originally intended to protect the wearer against projectiles and other weaponry, such as spears, arrows, and obsidian swords, but later was discovered to be capable of stopping musket shots.
- Bunk bed – the Iroquoian longhouses housed several families together. The concept of bunk beds was developed by these Native American peoples, since these longhouses included several bed combinations which featured one bed built on top of another, akin to bunk beds in modern times.

== C ==
The Aztec Calendar Stone

- Calendars – calendars were developed by indigenous Americans throughout North America, Mesoamerica, and South America. They are known to have been in use since 600 BCE. Some calendars were so precise, that by the 5th century BCE, they were only 19 minutes off.
- Canals – the Aztecs constructed great canals used for transporting food, cargo, and relaying people to the chinampas (floating gardens used for growing food) in their great metropolis of Tenochtitlan.
- Canoe – many indigenous nations–including the Caribs, Cree, Iroquois, and others–had developed many distinct forms, styles, and types of canoes over the millennia.
- Cassava – the first cultivation of cassava took place in southern Brazil and eastern Bolivia 8,000-10,000 years ago.
- Causeway – the Aztec built many giant causeways that connected the mainland to their capital city of Tenochtitlan, located in the heart of the Aztec Empire. The causeways served as arteries used for transporting food, goods, people, captive warriors, and wastes during the heyday of the Aztec Empire in the 14th century to the 16th century.
- Chaps – these appear to have been first used as a sort of leather armor to protect the legs from injury during guerrilla attacks by east coast native peoples. Some of these peoples ended up migrating to Texas shortly before the Texas Revolution, where it appears that others discovered that wearing chaps over pants reduced chafing on long horseback rides. It came to be later adopted by US, Mexican, and indigenous horse-riding cultures.
- Chewing gum – Native Americans in New England introduced the settlers to chewing gum made from the spruce tree. The Mayans, on the other hand, were the first people to use latex gum; better known to them as chicle.

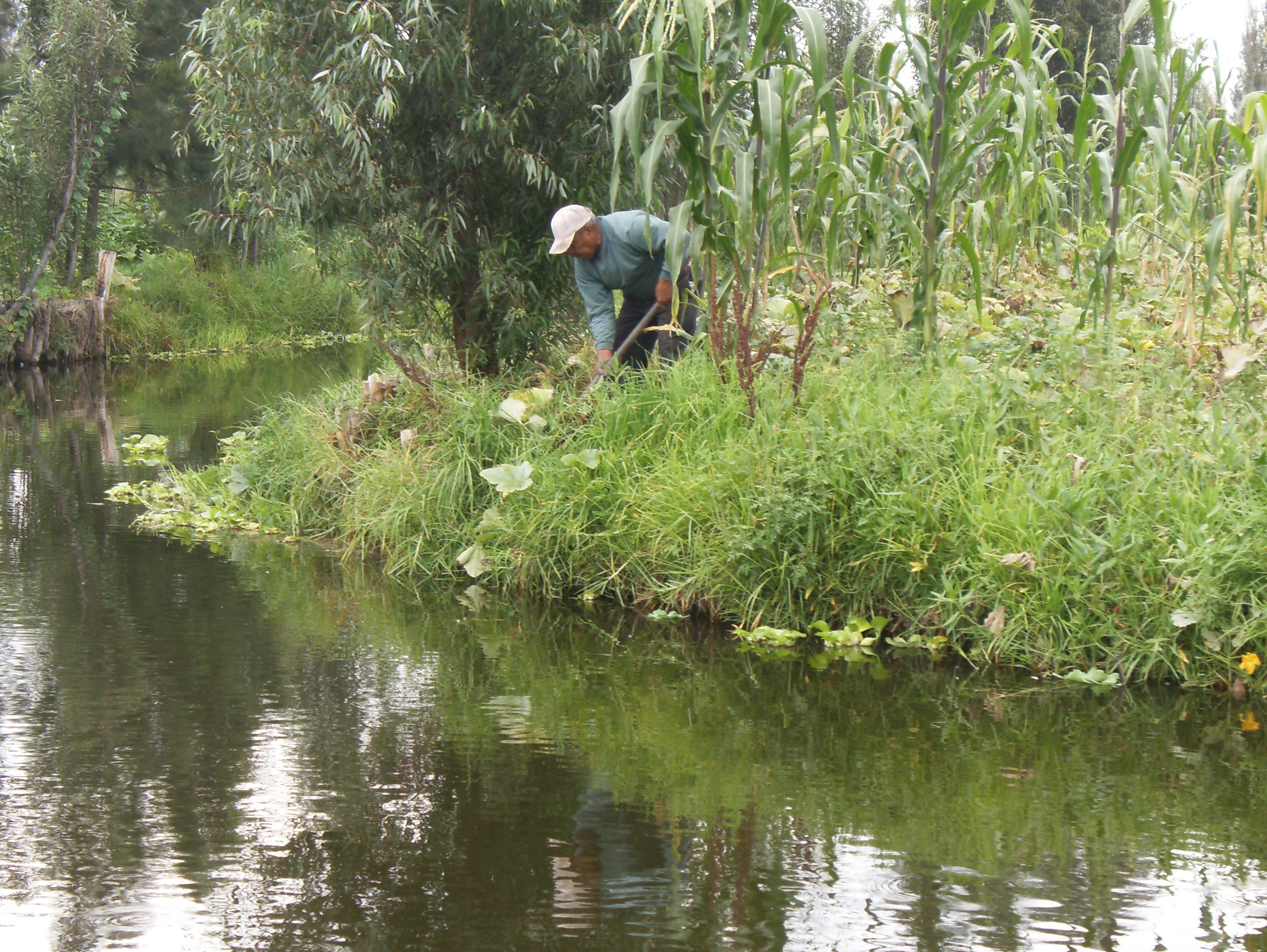
One of the few remaining chinampas at Xochimilco

- Chinampa – Chinampas, sometimes called "floating gardens," were highly productive agricultural systems developed in the Valley of Mexico. The Aztecs built and used them extensively for agriculture in and around the lakes of the Valley of Mexico.
- Chocolate – Produced from the seed of the tropical Theobroma cacao tree, cacao was first cultivated by the Olmec of Mesoamerica as early as 1900 BCE. The Maya and Aztec developed chocolate into a frothy ceremonial beverage.
- Chunkey – a Native American game where a person rolls a hoop covered in a leather strap framework and tries to hit it with spears or arrows. This may have inspired the sport of skeet shooting.
- Compass (possibly) – the Olmecs are known to have knowledge of magnetism. The discovery of a hematite artifact has led many experts to believe that Olmec invented the compass 1,000 years before the Chinese did, although some still are not convinced.
- Compulsory education – the Aztec Triple Alliance, which ruled from 1428 to 1521 CE, is considered to be the first state to implement a system of universal compulsory education.
- Corn beer – brewed in the Andes, it is of pre-Incan origin from the Wari culture.
- Cornmeal – an unsoaked meal (coarse flour) ground from dried maize. It is a common staple food, and is ground to fine, medium, and coarse consistencies.
- Cranberries – Native Americans were the first to domesticate and grow cranberries in the north east coast of the United States.

== D ==
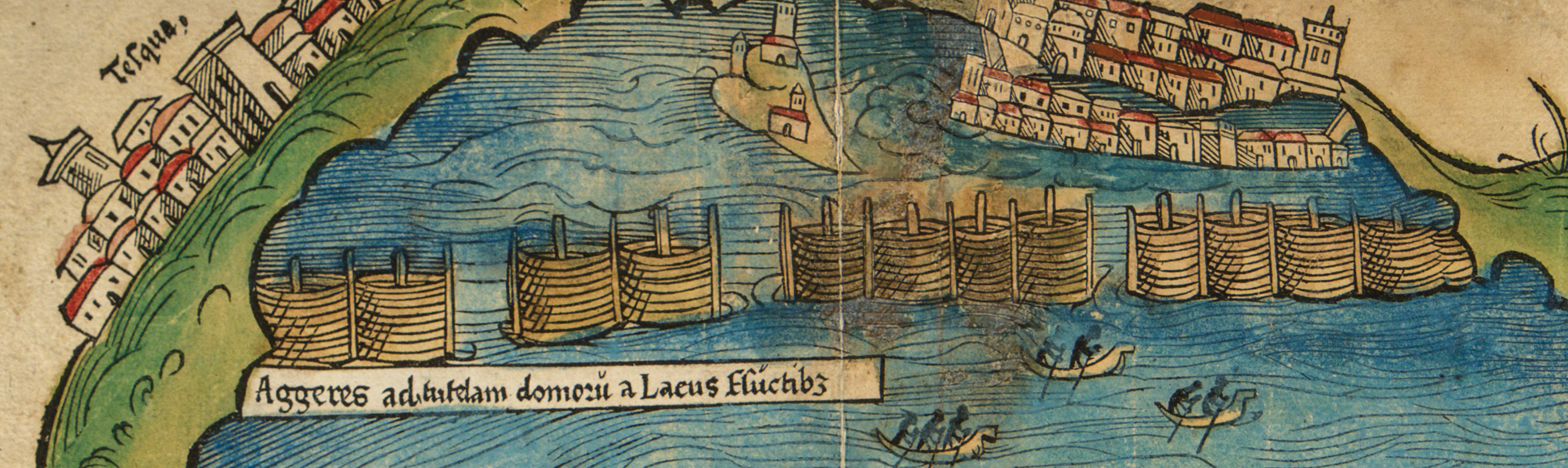
Detail of Nezahualcóyotl's dam to control water levels around Tenochtitlan

- Dams – the Aztec in Tenochtitlan constructed great dams during the heyday of the Aztec Empire. Tenochtitlan, the capital of the Aztec empire, was first built on a small island that was located in the western section of Lake Texcoco in 1325 CE. The Aztec created various large artificial islands around the small island using a system that was similar to building the chinampas (floating gardens in the lake that was used to grow food for the cities' population). To provide drinking water to the cities' population of over a quarter of a million inhabitants, the Aztec built a system of dams that separated the salty waters of the lake from the rainwater that was accumulated during periods of heavy rains. The Aztec also used the dam to control the level of water in the lake and prevent their city from being flooded during times of heavy rains. To prevent flooding, the Aztec constructed an inner system of channels that helped to control the water level and held the level steady during flooding and periods of intense rains. Hernán Cortés, and the other Spanish conquistadors, destroyed these engineering marvels that the Aztec had developed during the previous 200 years.
- Dog breeds – Native American dogs believed to have been bred by indigenous Americans are the xochiocoyotl (coyote), xoloitzcuintli (known as xolo or Mexican hairless), chihuahua, Peruvian Hairless Dog, the Carolina Dog, Canadian Eskimo Dog, and the Alaskan Malamute.

== E ==
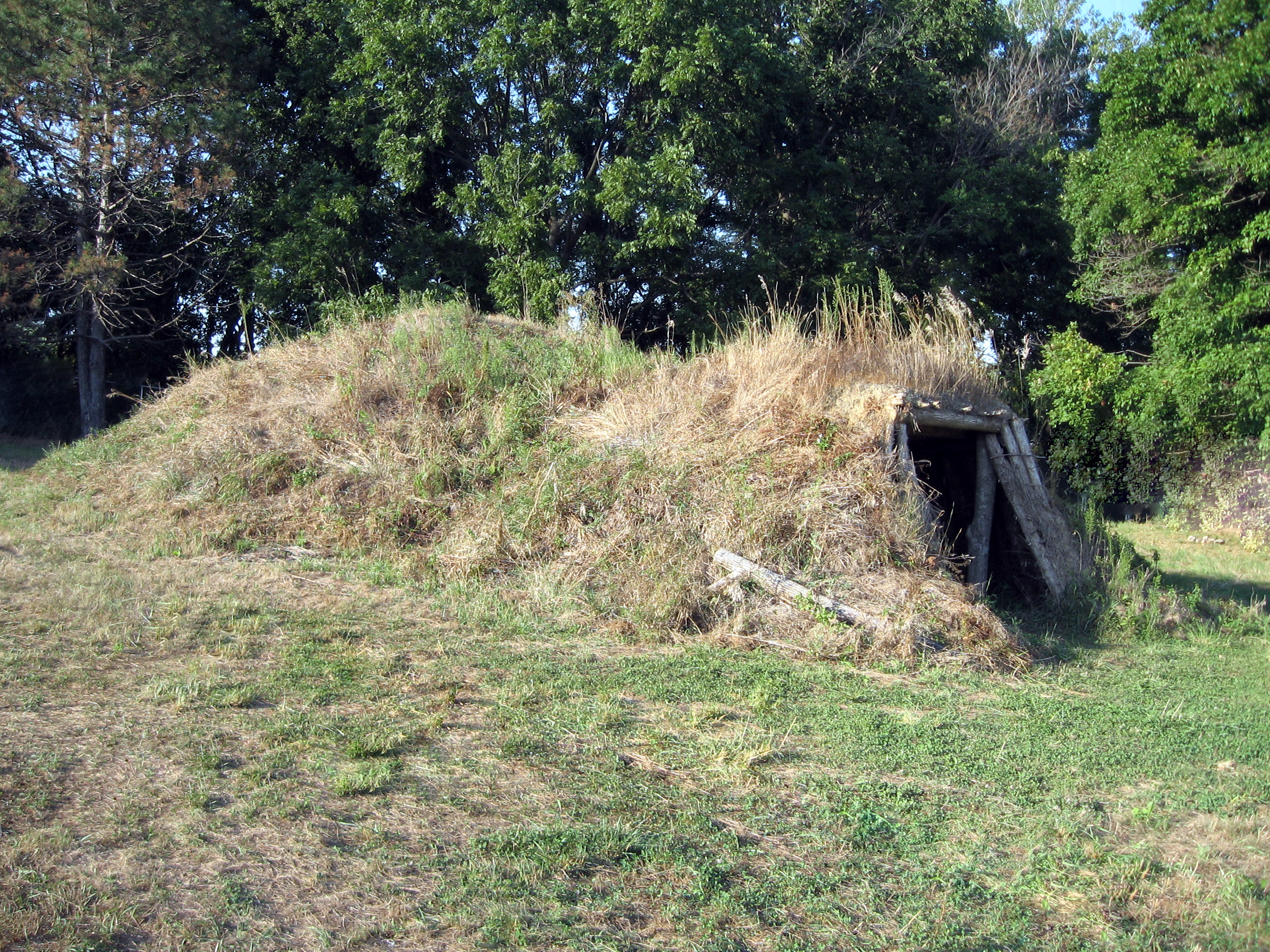
Reconstructed earth lodge, Glenwood, Iowa

- Earth lodge – A semi-subterranean dwelling with a heavy timber frame covered by layers of willow, grass, and earth, developed by Indigenous peoples of the Great Plains. The earliest true earth lodges were built in the early 1500s along the Missouri River by ancestors of the Mandan and Arikara, as a response to the cooling temperatures of the Little Ice Age. With diameters of up to 60 feet (18 m), they were the largest and most complex structures built on the Plains until the 20th century. In Pawnee culture, earth lodges served as astronomical observatories and were symbolically designed to represent the cosmos.
- Electroless plating – The Moche independently developed an advanced chemical gilding technique around 100-500 CE that produced results resembling modern electroplating, though it used no battery or external electrical current. The process involved dissolving gold into a chemical solution using naturally occurring minerals such as ferric sulfate and alum. Electroless plating predated electroplating (which requires an external power source) by approximately 1,700 years. True electroplating was not developed until around 1800 CE following Alessandro Volta's invention of the battery.
- Embalming – Egyptians are known for mummification, which began around 6000 BCE to 600 CE. In what is now Chile, however, the Chinchorro peoples are known to have been embalming and mummifying their dead since around 5000 BCE. Embalming is using preservatives to prevent decay of the body. Many other indigenous American peoples further perfected the art of embalming and mummification including the skilled Moche peoples in present-day Peru.
- Ephedra – the Aztecs used ephedra in order to treat common colds. Unlike the Chinese version of the ephedra, the New World ephedra that was used by the indigenous Americans contained milder alkaloids.

== F ==
- Fire pits – indigenous peoples throughout the Americas constructed fire pits, or hearths, for cooking, warmth, light, socializing, and tool manufacturing. Archaeological evidence of fire pits in the Americas dates back over 12,000 years; a hearth discovered at the Utah Test and Training Range containing tools, a spear tip, and tobacco seeds was dated to approximately 12,300 years ago, representing some of the earliest inhabitants of the Great Basin. Indigenous Americans developed sophisticated variations of the fire pit, including earth ovens, stone-lined pits used for slow-roasting plant bulbs such as camas, sotol, and agave, which represented a major dietary innovation during the Archaic period. Fire pits were also used for thousands of years to heat-treat stones for tool manufacturing, making them stronger and less likely to fracture, and later for firing pottery. The clambake, developed by indigenous peoples of the Atlantic seaboard such as the Wampanoag, uses a type of earth oven built on a beach with heated rocks, seaweed, and shellfish; early European settlers adopted and elaborated this practice from coastal indigenous peoples. In the Andes, the huatia earth oven, used to roast freshly harvested potatoes and other tubers over hot stones buried under earth, is a pre-Inca tradition that continues to be practiced as a communal celebration after the potato harvest.

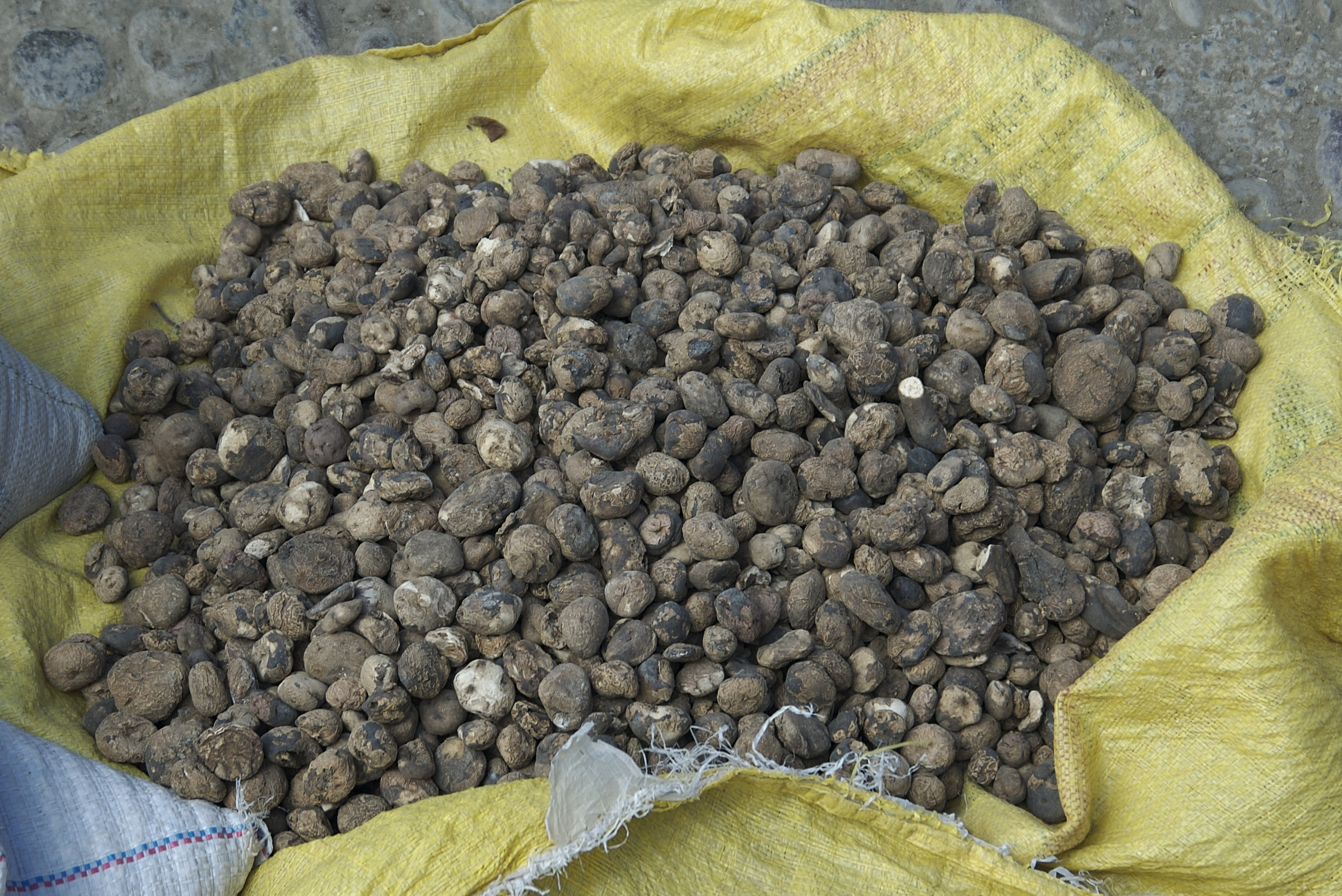
Chuño, a freeze dried potato

- Freeze-drying – the Andean civilizations learned to freeze dry potatoes (chuño) and other food items, so that the resultant dehydrated powder could be stored for years and then later transported across vast distances to feed countless peoples. The Spanish conquistadors used this Andean invented freeze-drying technique to transport several tonnes of dehydrated potatoes across the Atlantic Ocean back to Europe to feed Europeans.

== G ==
- Green bean – this, as well as other varieties, were first farmed in South America and migrated to North America where it was adopted by Europeans.
- Guinea pigs – indigenous South Americans had domesticated the guinea pig as a food source around 9000 to 6000 BCE. The Inca people took guinea pig farming to new heights.

== H ==
- Hammock – The hammock was invented by indigenous peoples of the Caribbean and Central America. The word derives from the Taíno word hamaca. Christopher Columbus observed their use in the Bahamas in 1492.
- Harpoons – the Inuit had developed the harpoon independent of any Old World influences, in order to hunt seals, walrus, and whales. The Inuit of West Greenland called the harpoon maupok. Harpoons enabled the Inuit to hunt large marine mammals from a distance in the umiak and kayak in the open Arctic Ocean.
- Hockey – both field hockey and ice hockey are based on a game called shinny. This indigenous stickball game was played throughout North America well before the European arrival.

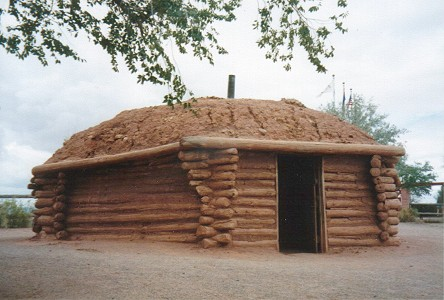
Modern day hogan.

- Hogan – the hogan is the traditional dwelling of the Navajo people, constructed from timber, packed earth, and stone. Hogans come in two primary forms: the conical "male" forked-stick hogan used for ceremonies, and the larger circular or polygonal "female" hogan used as a family dwelling. The east-facing entrance aligns with Navajo cosmology, and new hogans are traditionally consecrated with a Blessingway ceremony.
- Hominy – this is a specialized corn dish known by many North American native people. Today, it is most commonly seen in the Southern United States.
- Hydraulic pressure – The Maya at Palenque (in modern-day Chiapas, Mexico) engineered the first known pressurized water system in the Americas. By constructing a subterranean aqueduct (the Piedras Bolas aqueduct) that narrowed significantly at the downstream end, they utilized hydraulic principles to create water pressure capable of shooting water upwards to a height of 6 meters (20 ft). This system was likely used for fountains or sanitary purposes, operating without the need for mechanical pumps.

== I ==
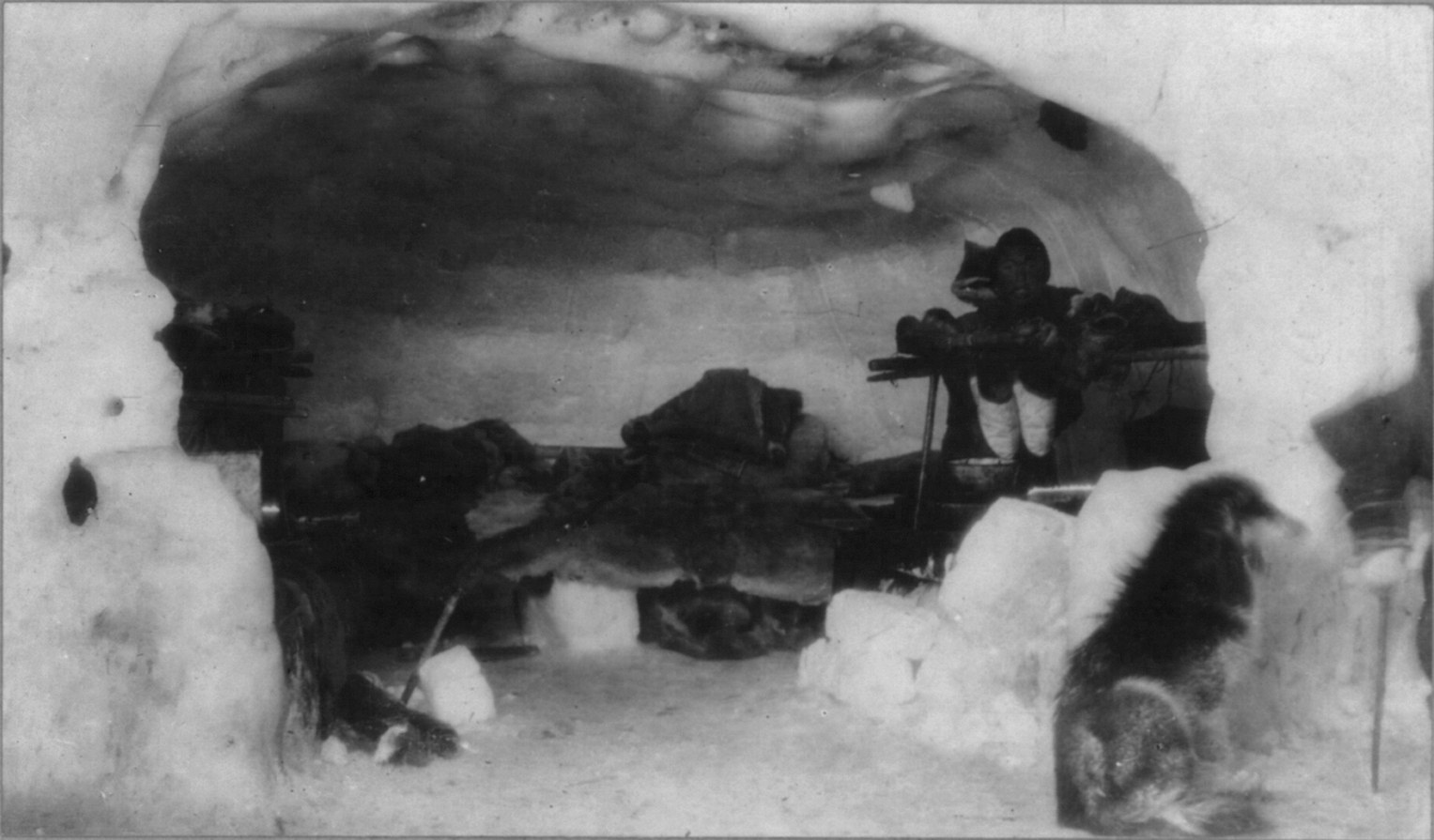
Inside an igloo

- Igloos – built by the Inuit, igloos were constructed for many centuries as a form of protection and shelter to house people from the harsh Arctic weather. While the temperature outside an igloo may have been −45 °C (−49 °F), the temperature within an igloo was stable ranging from −7 to 16 °C (19 to 61 °F) when warmed by body heat. The Central Inuit in Northern Canada (especially those, who lived around the Davis Strait), lined the inside living area of an igloo with animal skin and hides. This assisted in increasing the temperature within an igloo from around 2 °C (36 °F) to 10–20 °C (50–68 °F), thereby insuring a more comfortable existence for the inhabitants of the igloo from the fierce cold outside. With the addition of a qulliq the temperature could be raised even more.
- Inca road systems – the Inca built one of the most extensive road systems in the ancient world. The Incas built upon the roads, which were originally constructed by previous Andean civilizations such as the Chimu, Nazca, Wari, Moche, and others. The Inca also further refined and expanded upon the earlier innovations and systems laid in place by previous Indigenous cultures. The Incan road system, at its peak, spanned over 20,000 mi (32,000 km) and crisscrossed mountains, rivers, deserts, rainforests, and plains. The road system connected the empire from the Andes mountain in Colombia all through Ecuador, Peru, Bolivia, northeastern Argentina, and present-day northern Chile. The Inca roads were used to transport food, goods, people, and armies, while Inca officials frequently relayed messages using the roads across the vast stretches of the Inca Empire. In areas, where rivers blocked the directions of the roads, the Inca constructed elaborate and complex rope bridges.

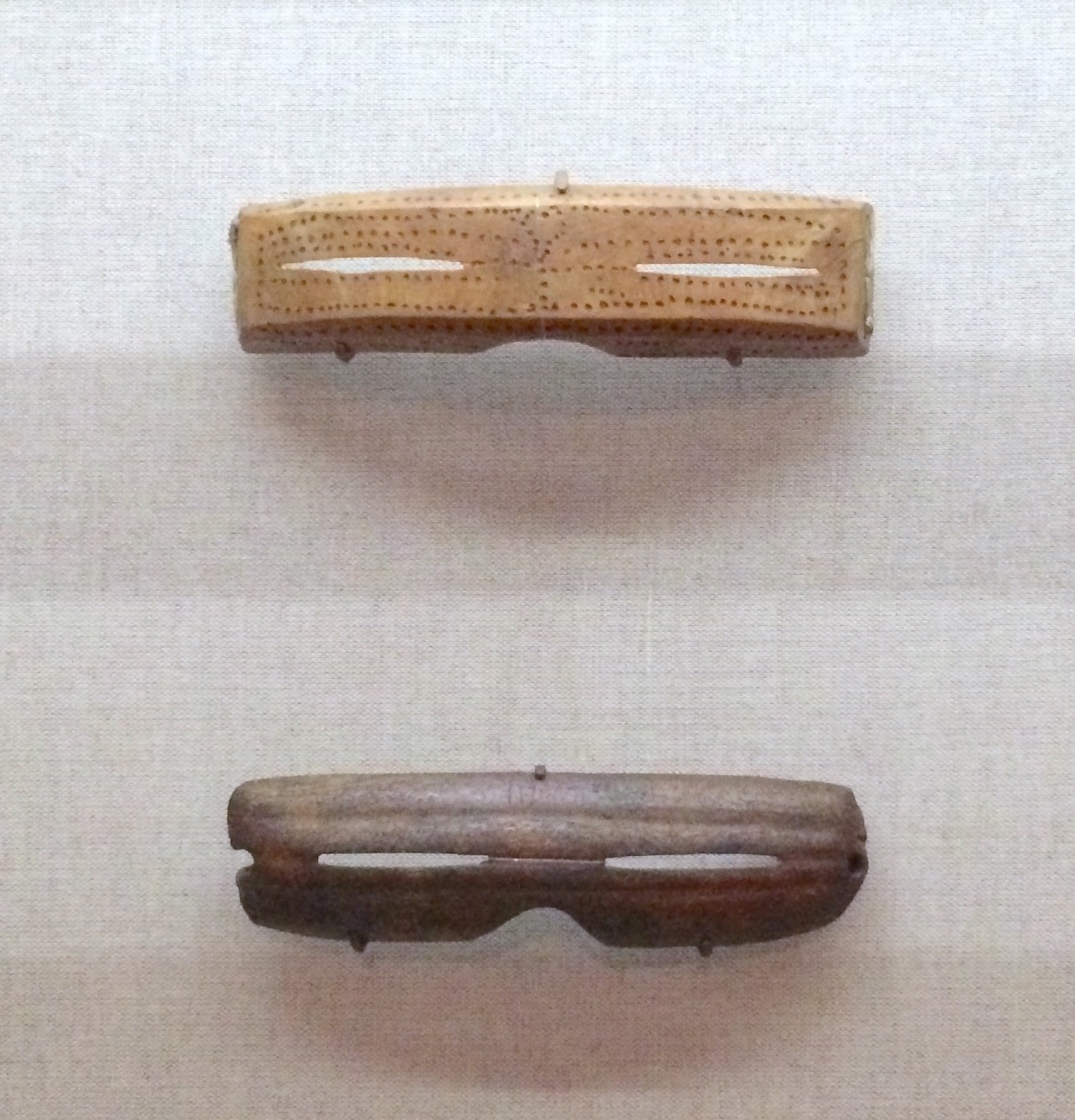
Snow goggles

- Inuit snow goggles – the Inuit made snow goggles which protected their eyes against the harsh winds in the Arctic regions of North America, long before sunglasses became available to modern Europeans.

== J ==
- Jerky – indigenous Americans were the first to develop jerky from smoked bison meat.

== K ==
- Kayak – originally developed by the Inuit, Yupik, and Aleut to hunt on inland lakes, rivers and coastal waters of the Arctic Ocean, North Atlantic, Bering Sea and North Pacific oceans.

== L ==
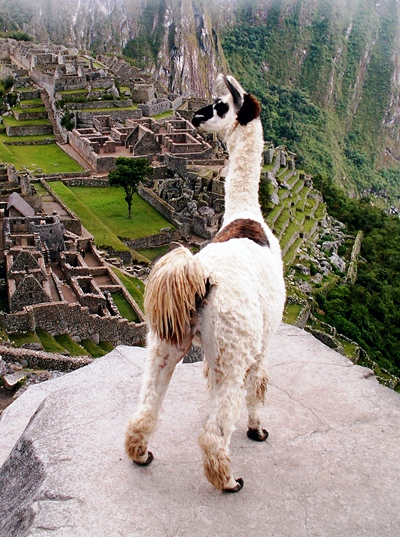
Llama overlooking Machu Picchu

- Lasso – the Lenape and early settlers allegedly record the use of the lasso as a sort of snare to trap large game. The Lenape eventually brought this to Texas, where it came to be implemented by the American and Mexican cowboy cultures.
- Lacrosse – Lacrosse originated among indigenous North American tribes, particularly the Haudenosaunee (Iroquois). Evidence suggests the game was played as early as 1100 CE.
- Llamas – indigenous people from Peru domesticated llamas in around 5000 BCE.

== M ==
- Maize – first cultivated in present-day Mexico several thousand years ago, corn is currently the most cultivated grain in the world with the US being the largest cultivator of maize followed by mainland China. Over 700 million tons of maize are grown worldwide annually today in order to feed people and animals. In addition, ethanol extracted from corn is also used to fuel engines in millions of vehicles, thousands of planes, and other engines throughout the world.
- Manioc – Native Americans were the first peoples in the world to cultivate manioc.
- Maple syrup and maple sugar – indigenous Americans were the first to extract the sap from maple trees and convert the sap into maple syrup and maple sugar.
- Martial arts - several Native American groups have developed styles of martial arts, such as the Mapuche style of Kollellaulliñ.
- Mathematics – the Olmec and the Maya–who succeeded the Olmec–independently developed the concept of zero (independent of the ancient Hindus in India) in mathematics. The ancient Mexicans also developed complex arithmetic functions and operations such as additions, subtractions, divisions, and multiplications. The development of mathematics by the Mexicans assisted them in making sense of the universe, cosmos, astronomy, architecture, and pre-Columbian calendars that were so essential in maintaining a connection between them and the gods and heavens.
- Metallurgy in pre-Columbian America – many pre-Columbian cultures, especially the Moche in the Andean regions were skilled metallurgists. Indigenous Americans mastered smelting, soldering, annealing, electroplating, sintering, alloying, low-wax casting, and many other metallurgical techniques independent of any Old World influences. The Moche were skilled in hammering and shaping gold, silver, copper, and bronze into intricate ornamental objects and chisels, while the later Incas developed more utilitarian objects using these metals and alloys. Metallurgical techniques later diffused from the Andean region of South America to Colombia and then later to Mesoamerica, where local artists and metallurgists developed even more unique techniques using a wide range of material, including alloys of copper-silver, copper-arsenic, copper-tin and copper-arsenic-tin.
- Moccasins – highly comfortable shoes used by indigenous Americans to travel vast distances. These shoes were often made of leather and were highly comfortable to wear. In addition, the moccasins could withstand the rugged terrain over which Native Americans traversed.

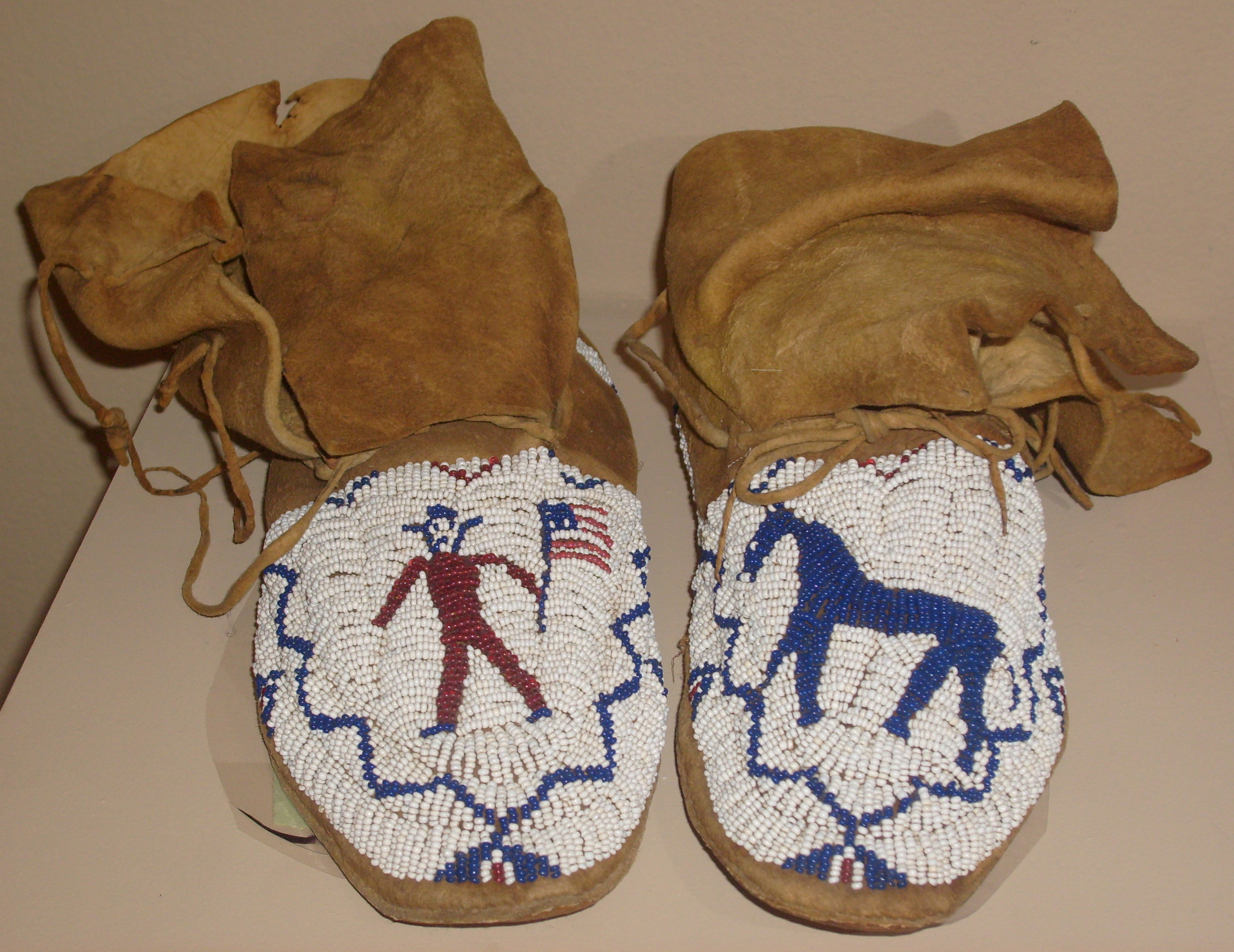
Beaded moccasins originally from the estate of Chief Washakie, Wind River Indian Reservation (Shoshone), Wyoming, c. 1900

- Muscovy duck – indigenous peoples were the first in the world to domesticate the Muscovy duck.

== N ==
- Neotropic cormorant - the Uru people domesticated the neotropic cormorant(an aquatic bird).
- Nixtamalization – the process originated in Mesoamerica, with the earliest evidence of its presence found in Guatemala's southern coast with equipment dated to 1200-1500 BCE.

== O ==
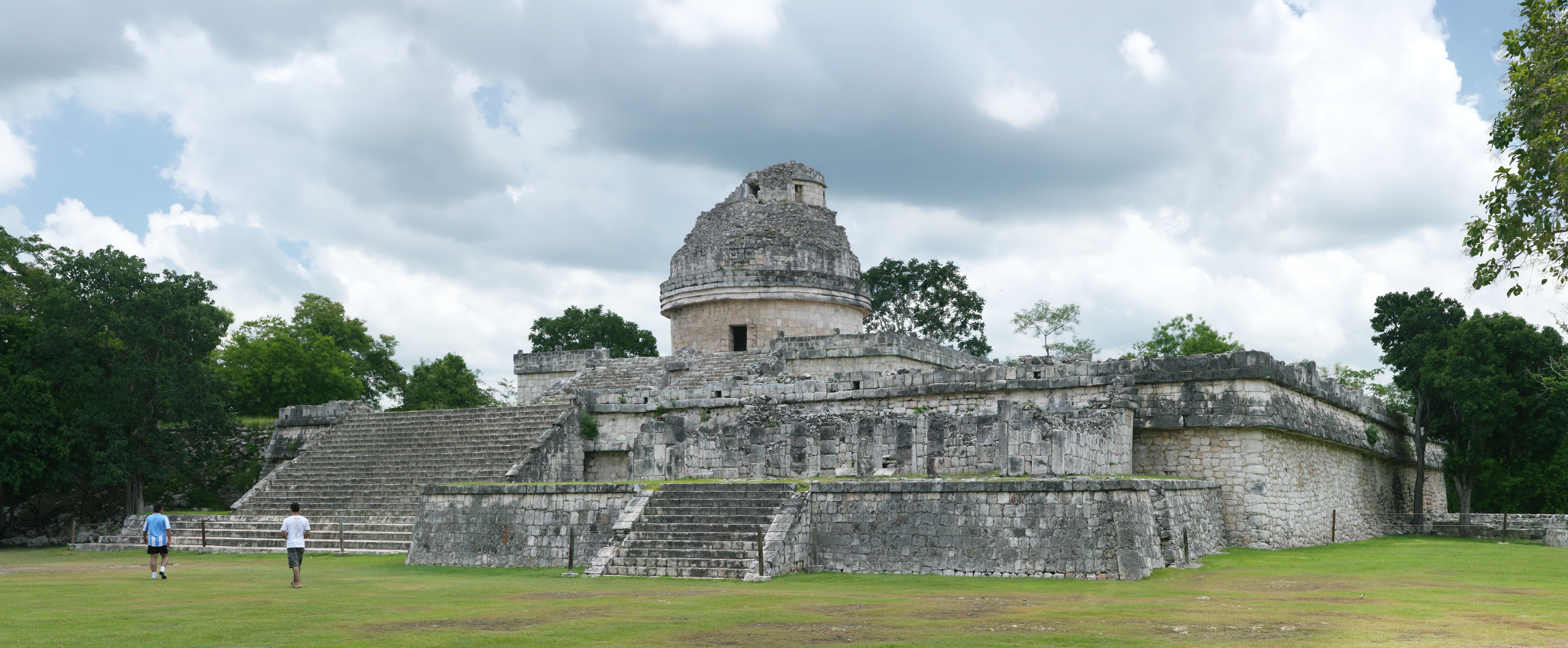
Maya observatory: El Caracol

- Observatories, astronomical – Andean and Mesoamerican astronomers constructed towers to observe the movements of the planets and other astronomical features and events. Although culture groups throughout the world have observed the planets and stars and recorded their movements, the stone structures of the Mesoamerican and Andean culture groups are significant because they show the emphasis these early astronomers placed on making clear and accurate observations. In the U.S., the Anasazi built structures with windows aligned for the observation of celestial events. The most notable example of Maya astronomical observatories is Caracol, in Chichén Itzá. In 1975, archaeoastronomers Anthony F. Aveni and Horst Hartung surveyed the site and suggested that ancient Maya astronomers used the structure to observe the planet Venus. The Maya, as well as other Mesoamerican culture groups, used Venus to set times for ceremonies and as a divination tool.

== P ==
- Painting – Classic period Maya paintings, found in the archaeological sites of Cacaxtla and Bonampak, are some of the most refined paintings ever to come out of the ancient Americas. Besides the Maya, other indigenous civilizations were also known for their wall paintings, including the Aztec and the Navajo, who developed the art of sand painting.

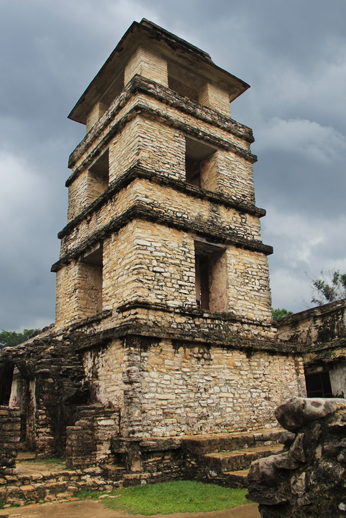
The palace observation tower at Palenque

- Palaces – indigenous American civilizations such as the Olmecs, Mayans, Zapotecs, Aztecs, Mixtecs, Moche, Toltecs, Inca, Chimú, Nazca and many more built elaborate palaces. The Mayan palace in Palenque is one of the best examples of Mayan palace architecture.
- Papaya – indigenous people residing around the Caribbean Sea and Mexico, such as the Mayans, domesticated papayas.
- Paper - the Maya used bark to make a type of bark paper called amate. Although it was extensively used during the Triple Alliance, its production was mostly banned by the Spanish after the conquest
- Parkas – the Inuit in the Arctic were the first peoples in the world to develop parkas. Parkas are great insulators, which protected the Inuit against the harsh Arctic winter. The pocket of air that was located within sewed caribou fur in a parka, protected a person against the brutal Arctic winter.
- Peanuts – indigenous Americans were the first peoples in the world to cultivate peanuts.
- Peanut butter – the Inca and Aztec processed ground roasted peanuts into a paste similar to peanut butter.
- Pemmican – indigenous Americans were the first to develop pemmican as a nutritious and high-energy food.
- Pepper – Mesoamericans were the first to cultivate peppers, including chili peppers of all types and sweet red, green, yellow, and all other colorful hues of non-chilli peppers.
- Petroleum use – Native Americans in present-day Pennsylvania, the Iroquois, lit petroleum which seeped from underground to fire ceremonial fires. In addition, they also used petroleum to cover their bodies against insect bites and as a form of jelly to prevent their skins from drying out.
- Peyote – indigenous people realized the antibiotic property of peyote and used the extract to treat fevers and enhance the energy in their bodies and treatment as an anesthetic.
- Pineapple – indigenous people residing in what is now Brazil and the Paraná River valley of Paraguay were the first to cultivate the pineapple. From there, pineapple cultivation spread to Mexico, Central and South America and the Caribbean. Indigenous Americans used the pineapple as a source of food.
- Planned city construction – ancient cities in Mexico–such as Teotihuacan and the Aztec capital of Tenochtitlan–incorporated planned city design, including streets laid out in a grid pattern.
- Plumbing – the Maya have been found to be the earliest inventors of plumbing in Mesoamerica, with the earliest example of a pressurized water system being constructed in 750 CE—or earlier. This pressurized water system was located in the Maya site of Palenque, where public baths and toilets were accessible to the residents of the ancient city.
- Poncho – worn by indigenous Americans in central Mexico, the Andes and Patagonia.
- Popcorn – Indigenous Americans were among the earliest peoples to develop popcorn, with evidence of popcorn dating back thousands of years in the Americas.
- Potato – The potato was domesticated 7,000–10,000 years ago in the highlands of southern Peru and northwestern Bolivia near Lake Titicaca.
- Pot roast – in one of the Lakota legends recorded in Lakota mythology, the character Wohpe is seen creating a dish in exactly the same manner as we make pot roasts today—sealing a large chunk of meat and vegetables in a bag and steaming it in a pot.

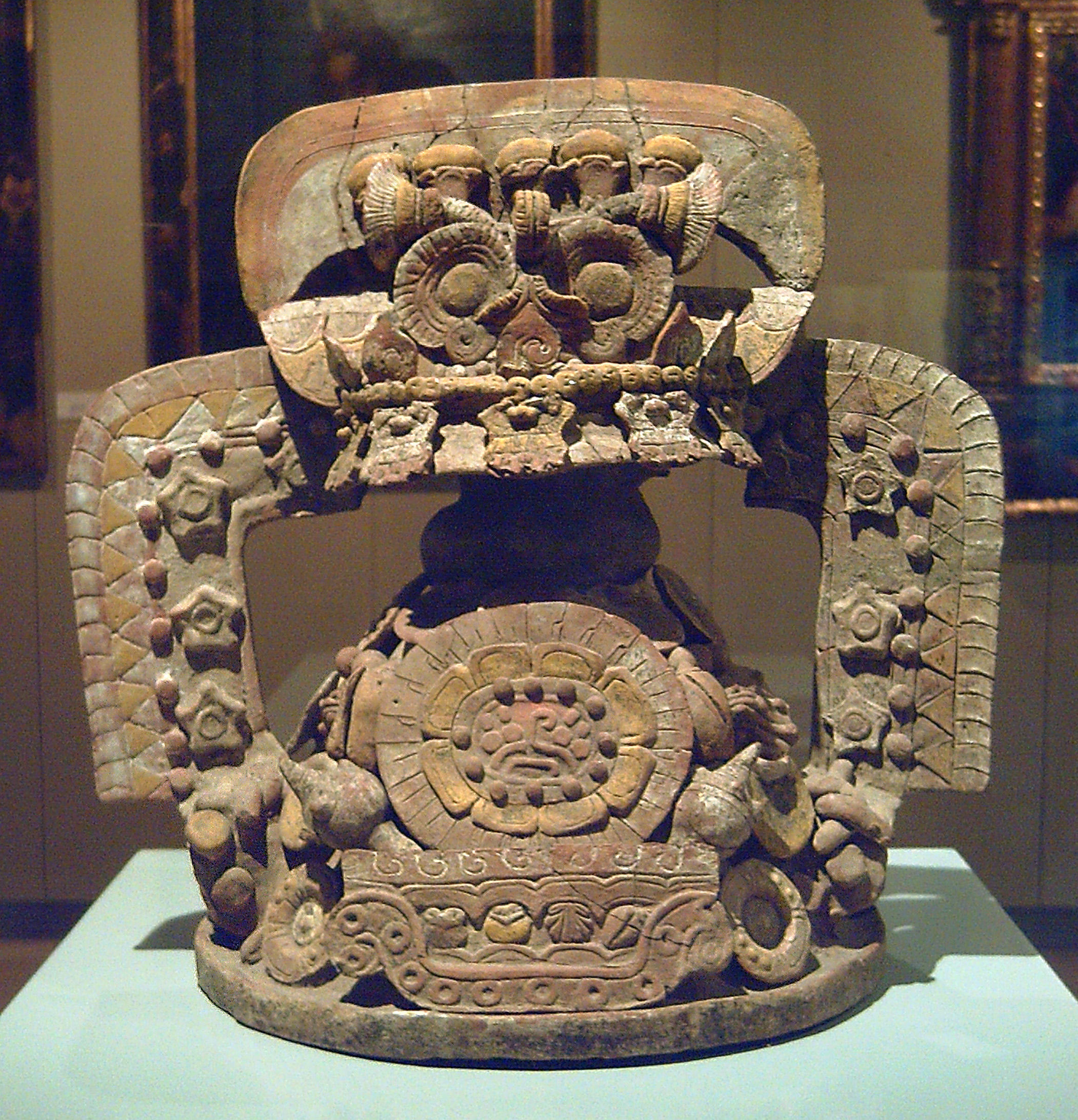
Teotihuacan incense burner lid

- Pottery – many indigenous American cultures and peoples independently invented and then refined pottery in the Americas into fine works of art, as well for utilitarian usage. The Moche and Maya were some of the best potters from the ancient Americas, and their work still inspires awe amongst us for the level of artistry, creativity, and sophistication, which such highly prized works of arts involved. The Navajo are also very skilled developers of pottery and their works in the present time are highly detailed and much prized. Many other indigenous American cultures also developed their own pottery styles during the pre-Columbian time periods and continued to refine their artwork into the modern era.
- Pumpkins – indigenous Americans were the first to domesticate and grow pumpkins.
- Puna ibis - the Puna ibis was domesticated by the Uru people.
- Puquios
- Pyramids – advanced civilizations in Mexico, such as the Toltecs, Olmecs, Zapotecs, Aztecs, Mayans, Mixtecs, developed their own myriad styles of pyramids, usually step pyramid, which served for ceremonial/religious and administrative functions. In Mesoamerica, the largest pyramid in the world—The Great Pyramid of Cholula—began to be constructed by the inhabitants of Cholula in the 3rd century BCE. In the Andean regions, the Moches, and some ancient Peruvians also constructed gigantic pyramids as well without any influence from Old World civilizations.

== Q ==
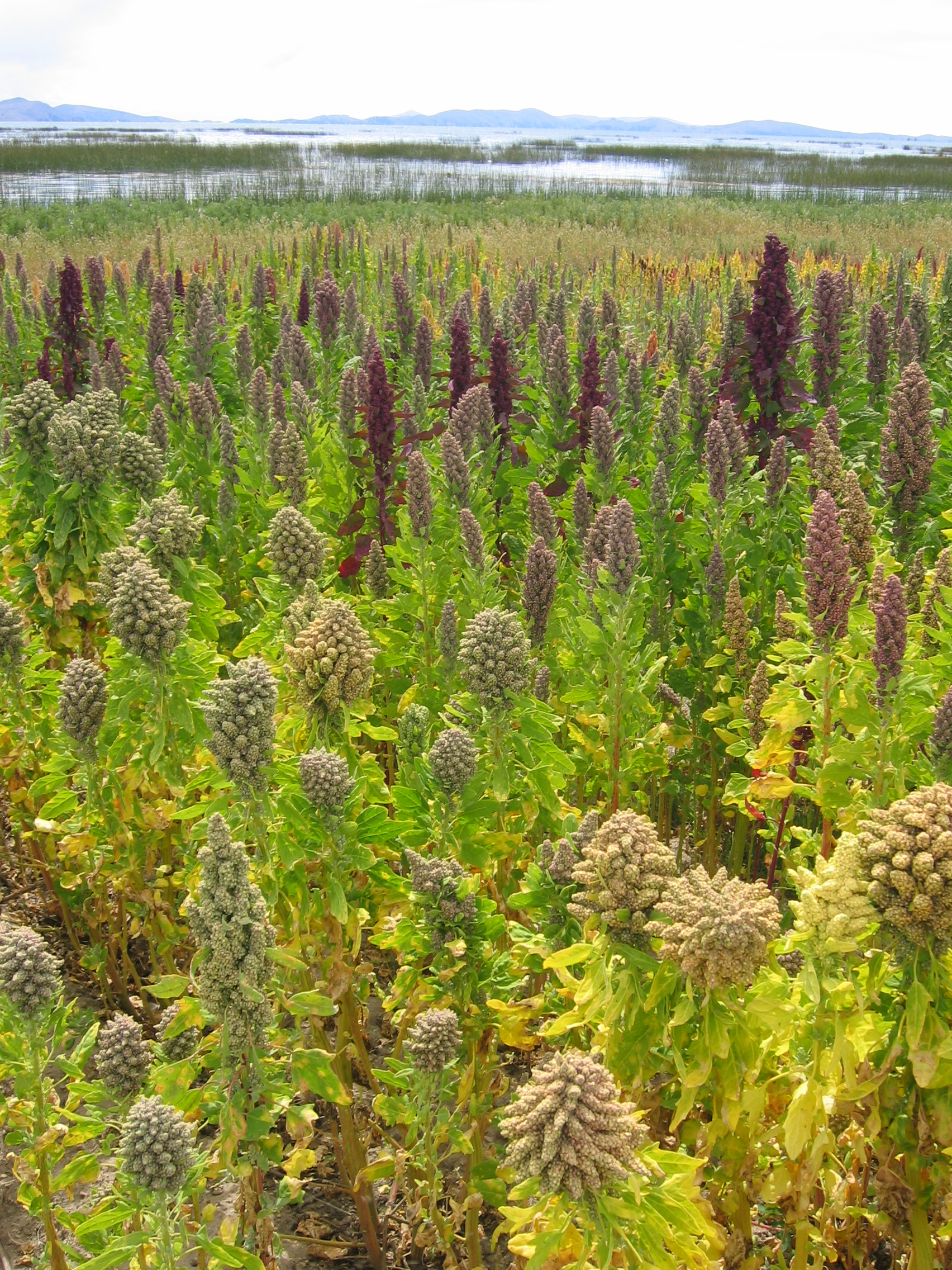
Quinoa at Lake Titicaca, Bolivia

- Quinoa – first grown and cultivated in the Andes. This is a food grain which the indigenous Americans first developed and the grain is considered to be one of the most nutritious items there is.
- Quinine – a muscle relaxant, which has been used for many centuries by the Quechua people in the Andes area of South America. The medicine was used by many Andean people to prevent shivering due to cold in the low-temperature areas in the high Andes mountains of Peru. The ancient Peruvians would mix the ground bark of cinchona trees with water to eliminate the bark's bitter taste, and then drink the resultant tonic water to soothe their nerves and senses.
- Quipu – quipus were developed by the ancient Andeans. Quipus mimic an accounting, record-keeping, and communication system that uses knots and strings in order to record valuable information related to population, economic data, food grain supplies, calendars, events, etc.
- Qulliq – A crescent-shaped soapstone oil lamp fuelled by rendered seal blubber with a wick of dried Arctic cottongrass or moss, used by the Inuit and other circumpolar peoples for heating, lighting, cooking, melting snow, and drying clothes in the Arctic environment. Oil lamps have been found at Paleo-Eskimo sites dating to the Norton tradition approximately 3,000 years ago and were a standard implement of the Dorset culture and the Thule people, showing little design change over millennia. The qulliq was the single most important piece of household equipment in Inuit dwellings, tended by women and carried with the family when they moved. It remains an important cultural symbol, appearing on the coat of arms of Nunavut and lit at the 2021 investiture of Mary Simon as Governor General of Canada.

== R ==
- Rope bridge – Inca rope bridges were suspension bridges made from woven ichu grass, spanning canyons and rivers throughout the Andes. At their peak, at least 200 such bridges connected the Inca road system.
- Reed boats – a balsa was a boat that was constructed by pre-Columbian South Americans from woven reeds of totora bullrush. These reed boats varied in size from that of a small canoe used for navigation, transportation, and for small-scale fishing to large ships of up to 30 m (98 ft) in length, which were used for war, transportation, bulk goods hauling, and transporting royalty and nobility. They are still used today on Lake Titicaca in Peru and Bolivia by the indigenous peoples living along the banks of the lake.
- Rubber – the indigenous cultures of Mesoamerica were the first peoples in the world to extract the sap from rubber trees and then use it to make clothes, rubber balls to be played in ceremonial ball games, and many other utilitarian uses. Indigenous peoples, especially those who lived in the Amazon rainforest found many other uses for rubber. The science and technique of extracting sap from rubber trees and then using the sap to make goods made of rubber then spread to the high civilizations of the Andes and elsewhere in the Americas.
- Rubber balloons – the Olmec were the first people to use rubber balloons. Their civilization arose in 1700 BCE in the Yucatán Peninsula.

== S ==
- Salsa – one of several sauces typical of Mexican cuisine.
- Sauna – the temazcal was a sweat lodge used by many cultures in Mesoamerica and the Great Plains.

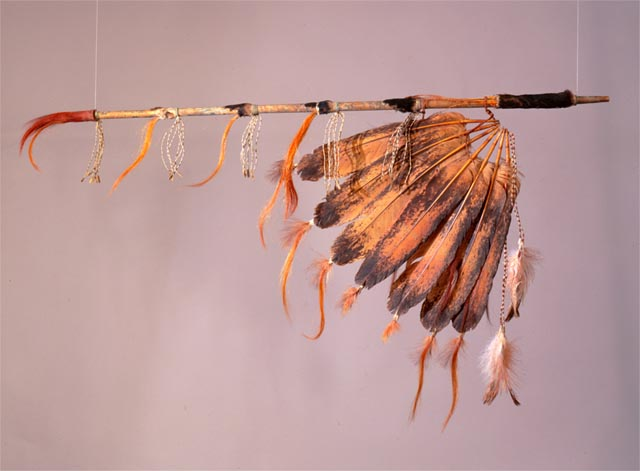
A Lakota (Sioux) chanunpa pipestem, without the pipe bowl

- Smoke signals – indigenous peoples throughout North America developed smoke signals as a form of long-distance visual communication. A signaler would build a fire on an elevated point, using damp grass or leaves to produce thick smoke, and then manipulate the smoke using a wet blanket or hide to create distinct puffs, spirals, or columns visible for up to fifty miles across the Plains. Each tribe devised its own private code, agreed upon in advance between sender and receiver, so that enemies could not interpret the messages. Signals were used to warn of danger, announce the presence of game, coordinate hunting parties and war movements, and call people to gatherings. In the Southwest, the Ancestral Puebloans constructed stone towers on hilltops to facilitate signaling with smoke, fire, and mirrors across vast distances. The Yámana of Tierra del Fuego also used smoke signals to alert neighboring groups when a whale had washed ashore, so that the meat could be shared before it spoiled.
- Smoking pipe – indigenous Americans invented the smoking pipe and in particular the ceremonial pipe a type of tobacco pipe. This was an unknown concept to Europeans and the idea was adopted by them and was shortly thereafter brought to the Chinese.
- Snowshoes – invented and then used first in the Americas by the indigenous tribes, which resided in the cold areas of North America in order to travel across a snow-laden landscape, especially during the long winter months, that gripped all of the region.
- Spinning top – known from Mesoamerican times. A device used as a toy and made out of wood.
- Spruce beer – a beverage made using pine needles. Also called pine beer and nettle beer, it was most likely originally brewed by First Nations, and predates the arrival of Europeans.
- Squash – the people of southern Mexico were the first to grow squash. Squash along with maize (corn) and beans represented the three sister crops of the ancient Mesoamericans.
- Sundials – the Inca and other pre-Columbian Americans constructed elaborate sundials for both ceremonial and religious purposes, but also for record-keeping.
- Sunflower – indigenous Americans were the first peoples in the world to cultivate the common sunflower.
- Suspension bridge – the ancient Maya constructed a suspension bridge over the Usumacinta River in Yaxchilan. This Maya Bridge at Yaxchilan would have been one of the longest bridges in use in the ancient past. The bridge was constructed in the 7th century CE and was a very long suspension bridge with a relatively level pathway.
- Syringe – indigenous American medicine men used syringes and hypodermic needles made from materials fashioned from hollow bird bones and animal bladders to inject medicine into sick patients and treat the illness of the patients.

== T ==
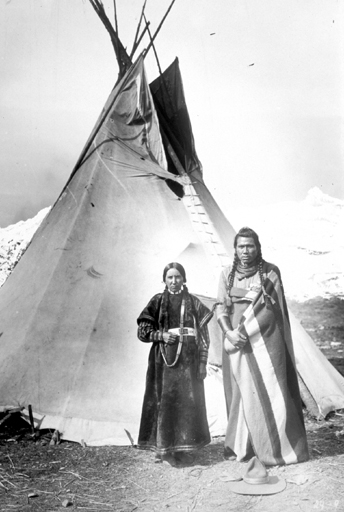
Nez Perce tipi

- Tamales – although largely associated with Mexico, and its indigenous Mesoamerican origin, records from the Iroquoian people show that they too made such a dish.
- Taxation – the Inca had a sophisticated taxation system, the mit'a, using quipus (knotted strings) as recording devices. Quipus were transported through the Inca road network messengers (chaskis) and administered by the quipu authorities (quipucamayoc).
- Tipi – a cone-shaped, portable dwelling popularized by Plains Indians (Native Americans and First Nations) of the Great Plains and the Canadian Prairies. Tipis were warm, durable, comfortable, and could be easily disassembled and packed. A settlement could be ready to move in about one hour.
- Tlingit armor – Tlingit armor was worn by coastal Indigenous nations in Alaska and British Columbia. Tlingit warriors wore battle helmets depicting either crest animals or ancestors, along with wooden visors, thick leather tunics, and body armor covered with wooden slats or coins. This battle attire combines technology, ingenuity, and symbolic power and protection.
- Tobacco – tobacco was used in the Americas for many centuries prior to the arrival of white Europeans. Consumed in high doses, tobacco can become highly hallucinogenic and was accordingly used by many indigenous peoples in the Americas to inspire dreams and dreamtime. Tobacco was also often consumed as a medicine amongst some tribes, although this was strictly practiced by experienced shamans and medicine men. Eastern tribes in the mainland US also traded tobacco as a trade item in exchange for food, clothing, beads, and salt, and would often smoke tobacco during sacred and ritualized ceremonies using pipes. Tobacco was considered to be a gift from the gods and it was believed that the exhaled tobacco smoke generated from smoking a pipe would carry one's thoughts and prayers to the creator up above in the heavens.
- Toboggan – the Innu and the Cree nations of Canada developed a sled in the form of the toboggan. These sleds were used to transport people and cargo across the snow using dogs as draft animals. Sled dogs such as Huskies were used to pull the dog sled along the harsh Canadian winter snows.
- Toggling harpoon – first used by the Red Paint People of the North American east coast, they were later used by the Thule.
- Tomato – indigenous Americans were the first peoples in the world to domesticate and cultivate the tomato by 500 BCE. The tomato was an essential ingredient that formed the basis of many indigenous foods including tamales, tostado, soups, and salads.
- Tomahawk - created originally by the Algonquian people before the arrival of Europeans, the Tomahawk would then later spread from the Algonquian culture to tribes in the South and Great Plains.
- Tortillas – this staple food well known today was used throughout Mesoamerican and Southwestern US cultures. Although they were mainly made of corn, squash and amaranth were also popular. The tortillas were wrapped around different fillings such as avocado. Today this has resulted in the creation of the modern taco, burrito, and enchilada.
- Tug of war – the Iroquois claim tug of war was once related to a sort of celebratory ritual they used to practice. The Mohave people occasionally used tug-of-war matches as means of settling disputes.
- Turkey – approximately 2,000 years ago, ancient Mesoamericans domesticated the turkey during the Late Preclassic period—from 300 BCE to 100 CE.

== U ==
- Urbanization - The Moche of Peru built dense housing at city centers, and included grid arrangements in road layouts.

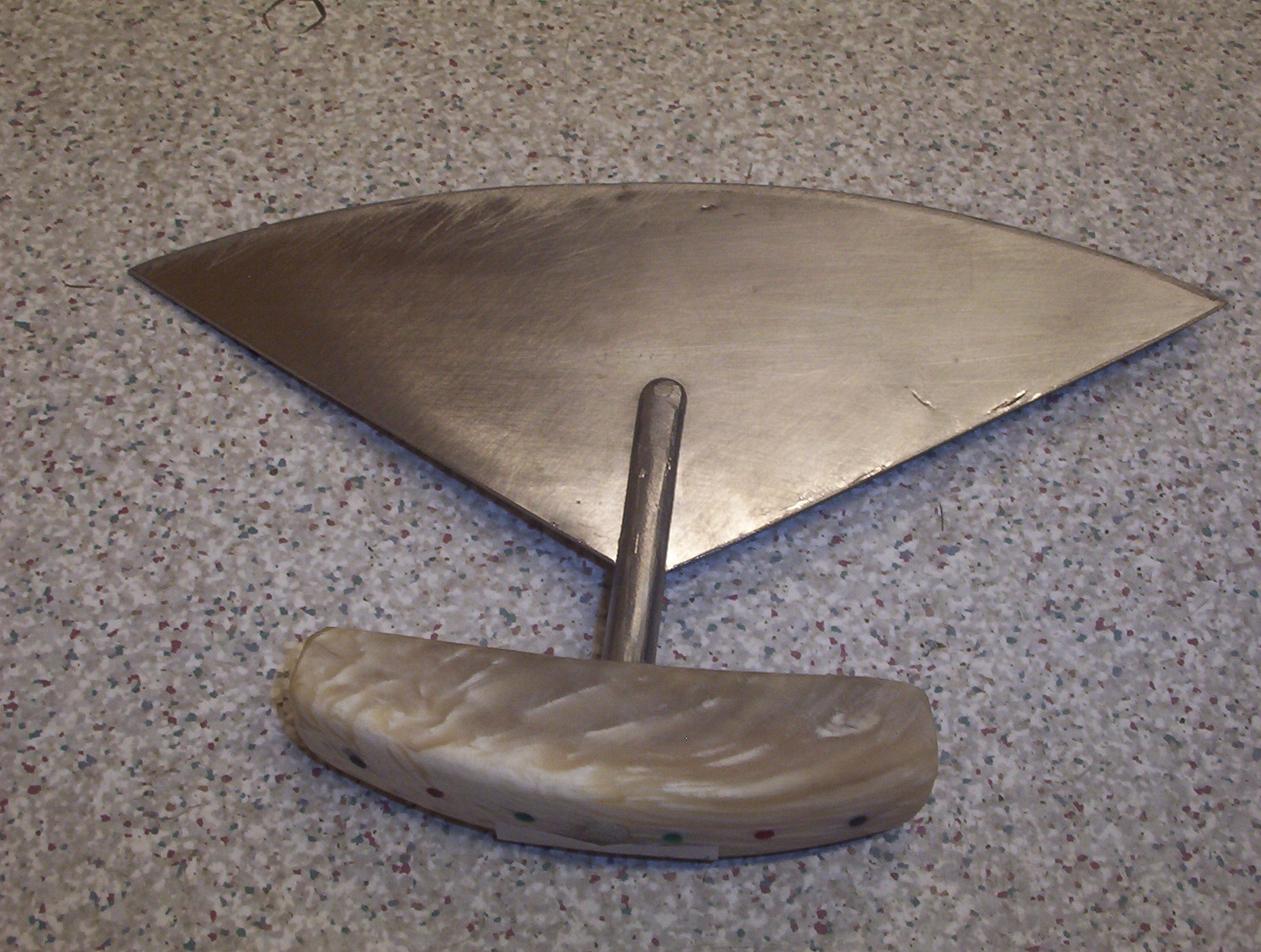
An ulu in the western Arctic style

- Ulu – a multi-purpose knife normally used by Inuit, Yupik and Aleut women
- Umbrellas – independent of the ancient Chinese (who had also invented the umbrellas on their own), the Maya and the Inca had invented circular umbrellas, which were made from bird feathers.

== V ==
- Vanilla – the Totonac are believed to have been the first to extract vanilla from the pods of vanilla orchids and use it as a flavor enhancer.
- Vulcanization – the Olmec people of Veracruz, Mexico treated the sap from rubber trees with chemicals and shaped the resulting rubber into a myriad of products such as balls, sandals, balloons, rubber syringes, etc. centuries before Charles Goodyear re-invented the process during the 19th century.

== W ==
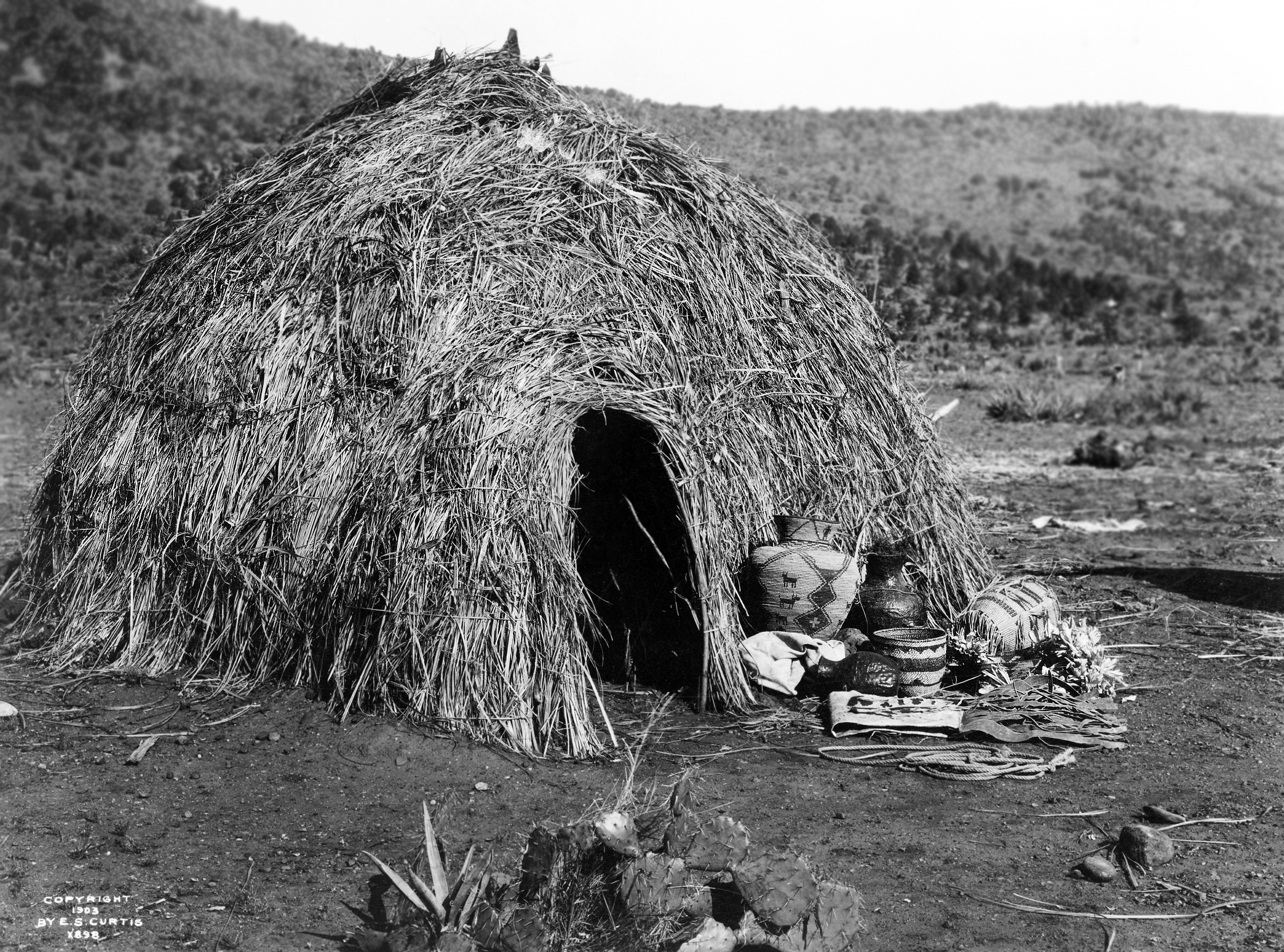
Apache wickiup, by Edward S. Curtis, 1903

- Water gun – some of the first water guns were more of a syringe-type device. The missionary Eugene Buechel recorded the Lakota peoples as making such toys for their children out of log rounds. However, whether or not they actually invented the device is up for debate.
- Weather forecasting - indigenous peoples in the Great Plains have conducted methods of weather forecasting by observing changing seasons.
- Whaling – indigenous peoples, such as the Inuit, have been whaling for many centuries using boats as part of a subsistence economy. Their whaling tradition in the Arctic region predates European colonization of the Americas.
- Wheel and axle – Mesoamericans invented wheels but only used these as toys. The oldest wheeled figure to have been uncovered in Mesoamerica is a crowned, dog-like figure in Tres Zapotes, Veracruz, dated ca. 100-200 CE. The most common examples of the Mesoamerican wheel and axle are Aztec clay wheeled toys.
- Whoopee cushion – natives of the great plains were known to use animal bladders as whoopee cushions to play practical jokes on each other. They were so popular, a common Lakota myth actually depicts a sorcerer using an animal bladder to put a spell of flatulence on a girl who spurned him.
- Wigwam – a wigwam, wickiup, or wetu is a domed room-dwelling formerly used by certain Native American and First Nations tribes, and still used for ceremonial purposes. The wigwam is not to be confused with the Plains tipi, which has a very different construction, structure, and use.
- Winter count - Several Native American groups in the Great Plains have used winter counts as pictorial calendars for record-keeping.
- Writing system – many indigenous American cultures, such as the Olmec, Maya, Aztec, Zapotec, and Toltec, developed Mesoamerican writing systems. Other native peoples to the north—mainly Algonquians—had organized pictographing, a common precursor of writing. (See Massachusett writing systems, Ojibwe writing systems.)

== X ==
- Xiuhpōhualli – A 365-day solar calendar used by the Aztecs and other pre-Columbian Nahua peoples in central Mexico. It consisted of eighteen 20-day periods plus a five-day period known as Nemontemi, considered to be unlucky. Used to track agricultural cycles and schedule religious festivals, it functioned alongside the 260-day Tonalpohualli ritual calendar; together these formed a 52-year calendar round.

== Y ==
- Yam – indigenous Americans in the Guyana region of South America domesticated the most important New World yam: D. Trifada
- Yucca – the plant was cultivated throughout the Americas, and is mostly distributed in coastal lowlands and dry beach scrub of coastal areas.

== Z ==
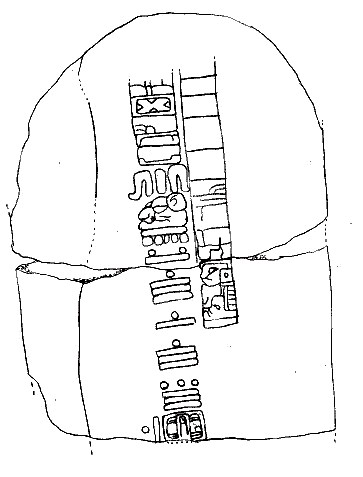
The back of Stela C

- Zero – the Olmec independently invented the concept of zero. The second earliest found instance of the use of zero—in Mesoamerica—has been dated to 32 BCE by the Epi-Olmec culture. This date has been arrived at based on the Long Count date on Stela C at Tres Zapotes. The symbol used for "zero" is a shell glyph, which is seen on the stone carving. Although the Olmec didn't leave behind any statues or reliefs with a "zero" glyph, the use of the Long Count calendar requires the knowledge of this concept since it is based on a (vigesimal) place-value number system.

== See also ==
- List of pre-Columbian cultures
- Domesticated plants of Mesoamerica
- Agriculture in Mesoamerica
- Mesoamerican cuisine
- Mesoamerican diet and subsistence
- Mesoamerican architecture
- Indigenous music of North America
- Painting in the Americas before European colonization
- Mesoamerican chronology
