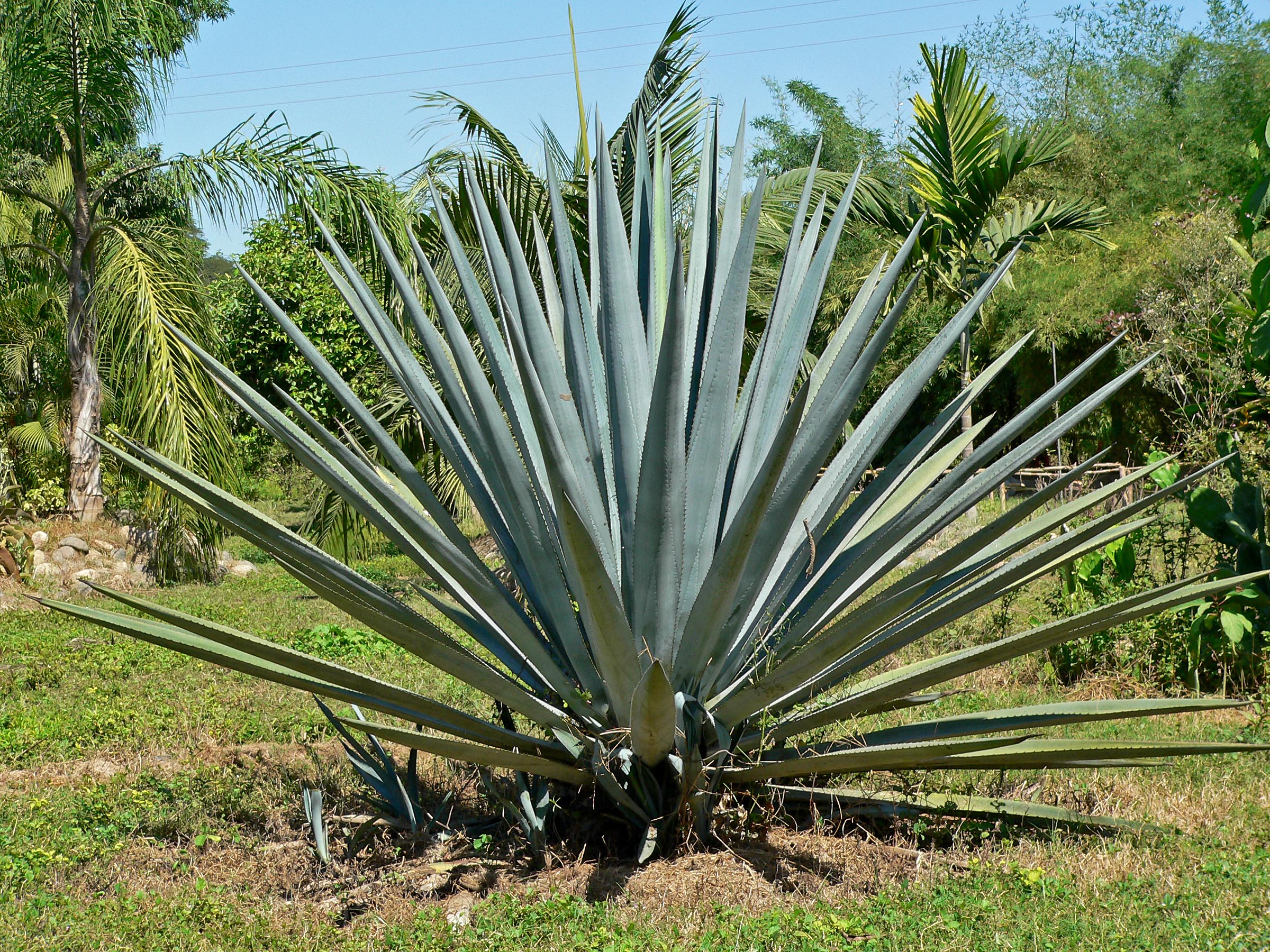

Scientific classification
- Kingdom: Plantae
- Clade: Embryophytes
- Clade: Tracheophytes
- Clade: Spermatophytes
- Clade: Angiosperms
- Clade: Monocots
- Order: Asparagales
- Family: Asparagaceae
- Subfamily: Agavoideae
- Genus: Agave
- Species: A. tequilana

Binomial name
- Agave tequilana F.A.C.Weber

Synonyms
- List: Agave angustifolia subsp. tequilana (F.A.C.Weber) Valenz.-Zap. & Nabhan; Agave palmaris Trel.; Agave pedrosana Trel.; Agave pes-mulae Trel.; Agave pseudotequilana Trel.

= Blue agave =

Plant species in the asparagus family

Agave tequilana, commonly called blue agave (agave azul) or tequila agave, is an agave plant that is an important economic product of Jalisco state of Mexico, due to its role as the base ingredient of tequila. The high production of inulin in the core of the plant is the main characteristic that makes it suitable for the preparation of alcoholic beverages.

The tequila agave is native to the states of Jalisco, Colima, Nayarit, Michoacán, and Aguascalientes in Mexico. The plant favors altitudes of more than 1,500 metres (5,000 ft) and grows in rich and sandy soils. Blue agave plants grow into large succulents, with spiky fleshy leaves, that can reach over 2 metres (7 ft) in height. Blue agaves sprout a stalk when they are about five years old. These stalks can grow an additional 5 metres (16 ft), and they are topped with yellow flowers. The stalk is cut off from commercial plants so the plant will put more energy into the heart.

The flowers are pollinated by the greater long-nosed bat, as well as insects and hummingbirds, and produce several thousand seeds per plant, many of them sterile. The plant then dies. Cultivated plants are reproduced by planting the previously removed shoots; this has led to a considerable loss of genetic diversity in cultivated blue agave.

It is rarely kept as a houseplant, but a 50-year-old blue agave in Boston grew a 9 m (30 ft) stalk requiring a hole in the greenhouse roof and flowered in the summer of 2006.

== Taxonomy ==
Agave tequilana was only scientifically described as a species in 1902 by Frédéric Albert Constantin Weber. It is listed as an accepted species by Plants of the World Online, World Flora Online, and World Plants. Though accepted as a species as of 2025, due to the similarity to Agave angustifolia a scientific description of it as subspecies was published in 2004.

== Tequila production ==
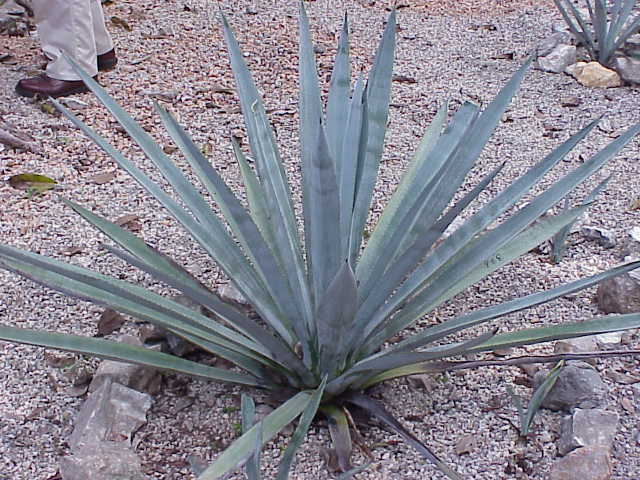
Agave tequilana 'Weber's Azul'

Tequila is made only from a specific cultivar of Agave tequilana called "Weber Azul." This cultivar is larger and blue-gray in color compared to the smaller and green normal A. tequilana. It is a rapid grower and prolific offsetter in keeping with its agricultural advantages. Tequila is produced by removing the heart (piña) of the plant in its seventh to fourteenth year (depending on growth rate and whims of harvester). Harvested piñas normally weigh 40–90 kg (80–200 lb). This heart is stripped of its leaves and heated to convert the inulin to sugars. Then the roasted core is pressed or crushed to release the sugary clear liquid called aguamiel, which is, in turn, fermented and distilled into alcohol. Tequila is also made with a sugar formulation of 51% agave and 49% other sugars. These tequilas are referred to as Mixtos.

== Pathogens ==
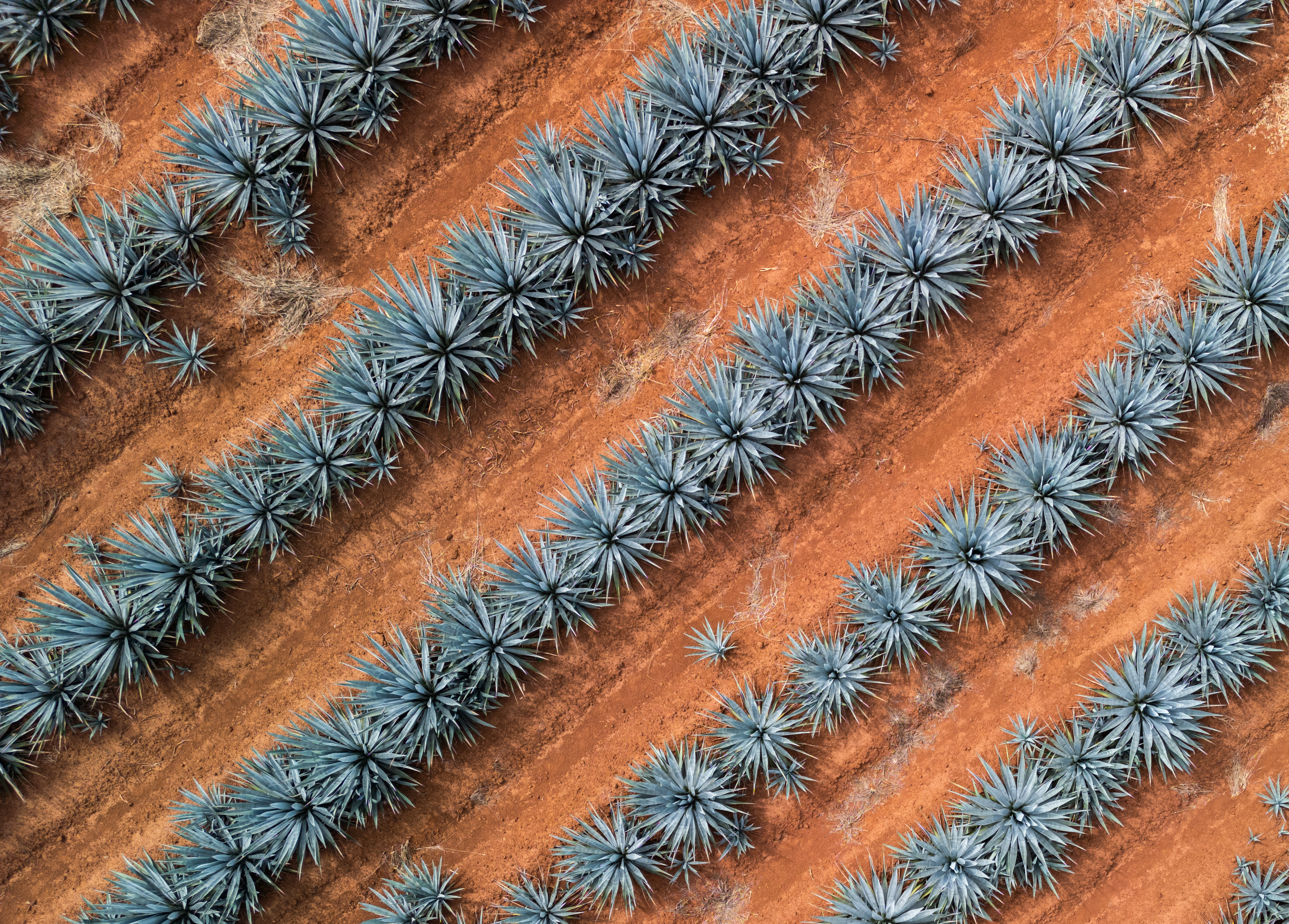
Agave field in Jalisco, Mexico

As agave production has moved to an industrial scale since the end of the 1980s, diseases and pests, collectively referred to as TMA (tristeza y muerte de agave, "wilting and death of agave"), have hit the crops. Through the 1990s, diseases spread, particularly Fusarium fungi and Erwinia bacteria, exacerbated by the low genetic diversity of the agave plants. Other problems include the agave weevil, Scyphophorus acupunctatus, and Thielaviopsis paradoxa.

According to a 2004 study, additional pathogens, Erwinia carotovora, Enterobacter agglomerans, Pseudomonas mendocina, and Serratia spp. are responsible for continued rot.

== See also ==
- Agave nectar
- Agave wine
