= Agave wine =

Fortified wine made from fermented blue agave

Agave Wine originates from Mexico. It is a fortified wine made from fermented blue agave, and fortified by being blended with blanco tequila. It is similar to tequila, in that it is harvested from the same plant. Although the two alcoholic beverages come from the weber blue agave plant, the drinks have similar, but different flavors. Agave wine has a much lower alcohol content and can be sold by vendors in the United States without an official liquor license. Also like tequila; agave wine comes in 100% de agave and mixto versions. 100% de agave wine has long been used in traditional Mexican margaritas.

== Production ==
Weber blue agave plants, used for the creation of agave wine, take up to 10 years to mature before harvest. The process of making 100% de agave wine starts the same way as making tequila. Mature agave is harvested and cooked in large ovens to release sugars within the plant. The aguamiel or "honey water" is then extracted from the plant using crushing rollers called "molinas." The aguamiel is then fermented between 6-10% ABV. The next step is what differentiates agave wine from tequila; instead of taking and distilling the fermented aguamiel to make tequila, agave wine is then filtered and 100% de agave blanco tequila at 55% ABV is added to "fortify" the wine to 24% ABV. Like tequila, if the label does not say "100% de agave" it is made with a neutral spirit other than tequila. In a "mixto" agave wine the fermented aguamiel is fortified with, most cases, a grain neutral spirit which is far less expensive.

== Popularity ==
Agave wine is popular in Mexico, and is growing in popularity in the United States.
