= List of Super Bowl commercials =

The commercials which are aired during the annual television broadcast of the National Football League Super Bowl championship draw considerable attention. In 2010, Nielsen reported that 51% of viewers prefer the commercials to the game itself.

== By decade ==
- List of 1960s Super Bowl commercials
- List of 1970s Super Bowl commercials
- List of 1980s Super Bowl commercials
- List of 1990s Super Bowl commercials
- List of 2000s Super Bowl commercials
- List of 2010s Super Bowl commercials
- List of 2020s Super Bowl commercials

== See also ==
- Super Bowl advertising
- USA Today Super Bowl Ad Meter
