= List of 2020s Super Bowl commercials =

This is a list of Super Bowl commercials that played during the 2020s. This article does not list advertisements for a local region or station (e.g. promoting local news shows), pre-kickoff and post-game commercials/sponsors, or in-game advertising sponsors and television bumpers.

== 2020 (LIV) ==
Product type	Advertiser/product	Title	Plot/notes
Car	Audi e-tron Sportback	"Let it Go"	Maisie Williams is stuck in a traffic jam surrounded by old vehicles. Sings "Let It Go", as she passes by lowriders, a repair shop and a gas station, leaving the fossil-fuel world behind.
Car	Hyundai Sonata	"Smaht Pahk"	John Krasinski demonstrates the new Remote Smart Parking Assist feature of his Hyundai Sonata, which he refers to in a thick Boston accent as "smaht pahk". The ad also features appearances by fellow Bostonians Rachel Dratch, Chris Evans, and Boston Red Sox player David Ortiz.
Car	Genesis GV80	"Going Away Party"	Chrissy Teigen throws a "going-away party" for "old luxury", in favor of "young luxury", symbolized by John Legend and a Genesis GV80.
Car	GMC Hummer EV	"Quiet Revolution"	Several scenes teasing aspects of the electric truck are followed by similar scenes in absolute silence, concluding with LeBron James sinking a slam dunk that smashes the backboard glass.
Car	Jeep Gladiator	"Groundhog Day"	Bill Murray reprises Groundhog Day, and goes on outdoor adventures in a Jeep Gladiator.
Car	Kia Seltos	"Tough Never Quits"	Rookie Josh Jacobs returns to his hometown of Tulsa, Oklahoma, offering advice and inspiration to his younger self to overcome the challenges he faced on his path to the NFL.
Car	Toyota Highlander	"Heroes"	Driving a Toyota Highlander, Cobie Smulders saves the day in various movie tropes including a biological disaster, a western and an alien invasion with room to spare.
Car	Porsche Taycan	"The Heist"	Security professionals are alerted when the Porsche Taycan is stolen from an exhibit at the Porsche museum; in the ensuing chase numerous vehicles are used such as a 911 Carrera S, a 917 K and a 918 Spyder.
Film	Black Widow		Movie promos
Film	F9		Movie promos
Film	The Invisible Man		Movie promos
Film	Minions: The Rise of Gru		Movie promos
Film	Mulan		Movie promos
Film	Top Gun: Maverick		Movie promos
Food and Drink	Doritos	"The Cool Ranch"	Lil Nas X and Sam Elliott participate in a dance showdown to "Old Town Road".
Food and Drink	Planters	"Tribute"	After dying in a previous ad, Mr. Peanut returns to life as a newborn child after the Kool-Aid Man's tears drip onto his grave.
Food and Drink	Pop-Tarts Pretzel	"Pop-Tarts Fixed the Pretzel"	Jonathan Van Ness serves as spokesperson for Pop-Tarts Pretzel, promoting it as an alternative to "boring" pretzels
Food and Drink	Presidente	"Never Left"	Features Alex Rodriguez, co-owner and chairman of the brand; he grew up in Miami and goes back to the city
Food and Drink	Pringles, Rick and Morty		Morty Smith enthusiastically enters the living room to promote various Pringles products, prompting Rick Sanchez to expose him as a robot, and realize he is trapped in a Pringles commercial.
Food and Drink	Saint Archer Gold		Professional skateboarder and Saint Archer co-founder Paul Rodriguez, whistles to a cover of "Patience" of Guns N' Roses.
Laundry detergent, beer, TV series	Tide Power Pods, Bud Light, The Masked Singer	#LaundryLater"	Charlie Day accidentally stains his shirt while watching the Super Bowl, leading him to contemplate when he should clean it now or later (such as during the halftime show, or the season premiere of The Masked Singer after the game on Fox).
Laundry detergent, beer	Tide Power Pods, Bud Light	"Bud Knight Now, #LaundryLater"	Charlie Day encounters the Bud Knight, wondering if his time period constitutes "later". However, it is actually 1436, and he is also ridiculed for the stain.
Laundry detergent, film	Tide Power Pods, Wonder Woman 1984	"Wonder Woman Now, #LaundryLater"	
Laundry detergent	Tide Power Pods	"Finally Later, #LaundryLater"	An elderly Charlie Day finally cleans his shirt, only for someone to stain it again with ice cream.
Streaming service	Disney+		A promo teasing three upcoming Marvel Studios television series premiering on Disney+, including The Falcon and the Winter Soldier, Loki, and WandaVision.
Website	Facebook	"Ready to Rock"	A series of Facebook groups containing the word "rock" are showcased, including cameos by Chris Rock and Sylvester Stallone.
Website	Google	"Loretta"	An elderly widower uses the Google Assistant to save and recall memories of his wife.

== 2021 (LV) ==
Product type	Advertiser/product	Title	Plot/notes
Car	Cadillac Lyriq	"ScissorHandsFree"	Edward Scissorhands' son Edgar (Timothée Chalamet) discovers hands-free driving on the new Cadillac Lyriq, easing his ability to drive despite having scissors for hands
Car	General Motors	"No Way Norway"	Jealous that more electric vehicles are sold per-capita in Norway than the United States, Will Ferrell embarks on a voyage there by barge to showcase General Motors' new Cadillac Lyriq and GMC Hummer EV. However, two of his friends, Kenan Thompson and Awkwafina, wind up in Finland, and Ferrell finds himself in Sweden instead.
Car	Jeep	"The Middle"	Bruce Springsteen drives on his Jeep to head to U.S. Center Chapel in Kansas while narrating a sense of being connected.
Car	Toyota	"Upstream"	American Paralympic swimmer Jessica Long swims in open waters featuring scenes of her life story, with a dramatized recreation of a phone call playing where her would-be adoptive parents are informed by an adoption agency that her lower legs would need to be amputated due to a rare medical condition, which the adopting parents fully accept.
Car accessories	WeatherTech	"Family"	Employees from the company explain how they love their work at WeatherTech
Car accessories	WeatherTech	"We Never Left"	Shows employees from the company telling that coming back didn't make any sense because they never left.
Electronics	Logitech	"Defy Logic"	Lil Nas X narrates a montage of people utilizing various Logitech products to "defy expectations".
Employment website	Indeed	"The Rising"	Shows people from all walks of life applying for new jobs while also experiencing many of the hardships they endured from loss of employment to starting a new life over.
Film	Coming 2 America		Movie promo
Film	F9		Movie promo
Film	Nobody		Movie promo
Film	Old		Movie promo
Film	Raya and the Last Dragon		Movie promo
Food and Drink	Anheuser-Busch	"Let's Grab a Beer"	Displays various scenes of different social interactions of people getting a beer as the narrator explains the social meaning of grabbing a beer.
Food and Drink	Bud Light	"Legends"	In a parody of The Avengers, a number of characters and spokespeople from past Bud Light commercials help a truck driver help right his overturned truck, and get the spilled boxes of Bud Light back in his truck to deliver them to a store that had run out of stock.
Food and Drink	Bud Light Seltzer Lemonade	"Last Year's Lemons"	A group of partygoers discuss how 2020 was a "lemon of a year", accentuated by a montage of human society being ruined by actual lemons raining from the sky.
Food and Drink	Chipotle Mexican Grill	"Can a Burrito Change the World?"	A boy asks how a burrito could change the world.
Food and Drink	Michelob Ultra Organic Seltzer	"All-Star Cast"	
Food and Drink	Oatly	"Wow No Cow"	Toni Petersson, the CEO of Oatly, sings a jingle in the middle of an oat field. The ad was originally aired in Sweden (where Oatly was based) back in 2014 which was banned for using the phrase "Milk, but made for humans." due to a lawsuit from the Swedish dairy lobby LRF Mjölk.
Freelance services	Fiverr	Opportunity Knocks"	Four Seasons Total Landscaping expands into a cavernous "press venue".
Insurance	CURE Auto Insurance	"Whip it Out"	
Laundry detergent	Tide	"The Jason Alexander Hoodie"	A mother tells her teenage son that his favorite hoodie, featuring the face of Jason Alexander printed on the front, should finally be washed. A montage shows Alexander's face on the hoodie negatively reacting to moments of everyday abuse. The boy also encounters the real Alexander, who demands the boy to "give [him] back [his] face." The ad features "Theme from The Greatest American Hero (Believe It or Not)" throughout, which was notably parodied by Alexander as his Seinfeld character George Costanza in the episode "The Susie".
Online food ordering	DoorDash	"The Neighborhood"	Daveed Diggs meets up with Big Bird from Sesame Street and shows the kinds of things that can get delivered from the neighborhood.
Online food ordering	Uber Eats	"Wayne's World & Cardi B's Shameless Manipulation"	Cardi B appears on Wayne's World as part of a segment encouraging viewers to eat at locally owned restaurants. Wayne Campbell (Mike Myers) and Garth Algar (Dana Carvey) promise that they would not rely on recent trends, subliminal messages, manipulative tactics, or celebrity cameos as part of their campaign, but proceed to do so anyway.
Online food ordering	Grubhub	"Delivery Dance"	An animated human eats a chicken sandwich, and everyone dances.
Smart speaker	Amazon Echo	"Alexa's Body"	A woman says that a fourth generation Echo Dot has the perfect body for Alexa until she sees a bus with an ad for the Amazon Original film Without Remorse starring Michael B. Jordan, causing her to daydream of having Jordan himself be her Alexa assistant, much to the chagrin of her fiancé.
Space Mission	Inspiration4 (Operated by SpaceX and Shift4Shop with corporation of St. Jude Children's Research Hospital)	"Join Us"	A close up of SpaceX's Space suit is shown (with views of the Earth in the reflection at the end) as the narrator announces Inspiration4, an all-civilian space mission.
TV series	The Falcon and the Winter Soldier (Disney+)		TV trailer
Streaming service	Paramount+	"Sweet Victory"	A cast of characters and personalities from various ViacomCBS franchises complete their trip to their "new home" of Mount Paramount.
Website	Squarespace	"5 to 9"	Dolly Parton reworks her song "9 to 5" to salute side jobs.
Wireless	T-Mobile	"Family Drama"	Anthony Anderson along with his mother, Doris Hancox, invited along with family and friends to play some football while many of his relatives and friends watch the game unfold.
Wireless	T-Mobile	"Rockstar 5G"	Over a video call, Gwen Stefani asks Adam Levine to set her up on a blind date with someone who is "completely different", from another country, "cultured", and "not threatened by a strong, confident woman". However, Levine's poor wireless signal causes him to only hear the words "completely country", "uncultured", and "threatened by a strong confident woman", so he sets Stefani up with Blake Shelton instead. A similar ad was also made by T-Mobile with Tom Brady and Rob Gronkowski but it was banned, although it was rumored to be to protect the official sponsorship rights from Verizon Wireless. The other ad was seen online instead.
Wireless	Verizon Wireless	"Can't Blame the Lag"	Speaking to a crowd of players in an online video game, Samuel L. Jackson tells them to stop blaming network lag as an excuse for their poor performance, and use Verizon 5G Ultra Wideband with low latency instead. Offended by being called out for making excuses, JuJu Smith-Schuster rides in on a giant fish that eats Jackson.

== 2022 (LVI) ==
Product type	Advertiser/product	Title	Plot/notes
Airlines	Turkish Airlines	"Pangea"	Morgan Freeman talks about Pangea, a supercontinent from eons ago.
Alcohol	The Botanist Islay Dry Gin 22	"The Spirit of Community"	The Botanist urges people to support local bars and restaurants.
Alcohol	Bud Light Next	"Zero in the Way of Possibility"	People are inspired to break out of the mold; features "Gotta Move" by Barbra Streisand
Alcohol	Bud Light Seltzer Hard Soda	"Land of Loud Flavors"	People snatch a bucket of hard soda cans from a party. The party guests follow them through the fridge to another world where Guy Fieri, the mayor, approves of the beverage.
Alcohol	Cutwater Spirits	"Here's to us lazy ones"	Celebrates people who relax
Alcohol	Michelob Ultra Organic Seltzer	"Caddie"	At the Superior Bowl, Brooks Koepka asks his caddy what to drink.
Alcohol (Beer)	Budweiser	"A Clydesdale's Journey"	A Clydesdale horse is injured while jumping a fence and becomes friends with a dog while in rehab.
Alcohol (Beer)	Michelob Ultra	"Welcome to Superior Bowl"	Peyton Manning goes to a bowling alley and hangs out with other stars.
Banking	Greenlight	"I'll Take It"	Ty Burrell makes many questionable purchases thinking he is getting a good deal and runs out of money.
Cable	AT&T Fiber	"A Lot in Common"	Demi Moore and Mila Kunis think they will be picked as their high school's Most Admired Alum, only to lose to a woman who is the first "Gigillionare". Moore and Kunis are both Fairfax High School graduates. FHS is in Los Angeles.
Car	BMW iX	"Zeus & Hera"	Zeus (Arnold Schwarzenegger) and Hera (Salma Hayek) retire to Palm Springs where he provides his neighbors with electricity.
Car	Chevrolet Silverado EV	"New Generation: The Sopranos"	Meadow and A.J. Soprano (Jamie-Lynn Sigler and Robert Iler respectively) drive to New Jersey while listening to "Woke Up This Morning," The Sopranos' theme song by British bandAlabama 3.
Car	Chevrolet Silverado 1500 LT Trail Boss	"Walter in Winter"	A sequel to "Cat" (ad for the same truck which aired during the 2021 Olympics in Tokyo); John Hoogenakker and his fictional feline, Walter, explore destinations in a Chevrolet Silverado 1500 LT Trail Boss pick-up truck enjoying winter
Car			The global COVID-19 pandemic started in December 2019. The 2020 Summer Olympics in Japan (Tokyo 2020), was postponed to July 23, 2021, to August 8, 2021. Chevy's Silverado's "Cat" commercial aired in 2021. The 2022 Winter Olympics took place in Beijing, China, from February 4 to 20, 2022. Chevy Silverado's "Walter in Winter" ad aired during the Winter Olympics the same day as the 2022 (LVI) Super Bowl which took place on Sunday, February 13, 2022, on NBC, Telemundo, and Streaming (including Peacock).
Car	General Motors	"Dr. EV-il"	Dr. Evil gets his cohorts back together scheming to make everyone use electric cars so he and his team can take over the world.
Car	Kia EV6	"Robo Dog"	A robotic dog is enamored by a car and follows it until it runs out of power.
Car	Nissan Ariya	"Thrill Driver"	Eugene Levy test drives a new car while being pursued by Catherine O'Hara, Brie Larson, and other stars.
Car	Polestar 2	"No Compromises"	
Car	Toyota	"Mobility for All"	How Robin and Brian McKeever competed in the Paralympic Games.
Car	Toyota Tundra	"The Joneses"	Tommy Lee Jones races Leslie Jones, Rashida Jones, and Nick Jonas.
Car accessories	WeatherTech	"Special Ops: Fit Crew"	A Weathertech special ops team preps a vehicle with products which were delivered to a customer's porch.
Car charging	Wallbox	"Can Seth embrace electricity again?"	A man struck by lightning a decade ago struggles to use any item using electricity, except for a Wallbox EV charger.
Car shopping	Carvana	"Oversharing Mom"	A suburban mom buys a car on Carvana.
Car shopping	Vroom	"Flake the Musical"	A woman sings a song reminiscent of the music in La La Land-style In the song she says that she sold a car but discovered the person flaked out and she lost the sale.
Cryptocurrency	Coinbase	"Less talk, more Bitcoin"	The ad is merely a QR code bouncing across a black screen: when scanned the code goes to a promo on the Coinbase website.
Cryptocurrency	Crypto.com	"The Moment of Truth"	LeBron James goes to 2003 and advises his younger self.
Cryptocurrency	eToro	"Flying Your Way"	Customers get into the crypto market via text.
Cryptocurrency	FTX	"Don't Miss Out"	Larry David is a time traveler. He turns down famous inventions including the inventors of the wheel, the light bulb, American independence, and cryptocurrency. The inventors implore everyone to not be like Larry.
E-commerce	Salesforce	"The New Frontier"	Matthew McConaughey in a space suit goes for a hot air balloonride.
Film	Netflix 2022 films/The Adam Project		A montage of Netflix film offerings for 2022, followed by a TV trailer for the film The Adam Project.
Film	Ambulance		Movie promo
Film	The Batman		Movie promo
Film	Bullet Train		Movie promo
Film	Marry Me		Movie promo
Film	Nope		Movie promo
Film	Sonic the Hedgehog 2		Movie promo
Fintech	gong.io	"What Did You Say?"	Gives their employees gongs to hit at their office
Fintech	Quickbooks	"Duality Duets"	DJ Khaled and other artists sing his song, "All I Do Is Win."
Fitness equipment	Tonal	"Strength Made Me"	Serena Williams works out with high-tech strength training equipment.
Food	Avocados from Mexico	"Big Game Commercial 2022"	Ancient Romans tailgate.
Food	Doritos and Cheetos Flamin' Hot	"Push It"	Woodland animals find snack bags accidentally left behin and celebrate, dancing to "Push It" by Salt-N-Pepa.
Food	Hellmann's Mayonnaise	"Mayo Tackles Food Waste"	Linebacker Jerod Mayo tackles people who are wasting food and hilariously Pete Davidson, who isn't.
Food	Lay's	"Golden Memories"	Wedding party guys (Seth Rogen and Paul Rudd) reminisce.
Food	Planters Mixed Nuts	"Feed the Debate"	Ken Jeong and Joel McHale's debate over mixed nuts sparks more conflicts.
Food	Pringles	"Stuck In"	Snackers get their hands stuck in a Pringles tube.
Food delivery	Uber Eats	"Uber Don't Eats"	Jennifer Coolidge and other celebs find out the hard way that Uber Eats delivers non-food products.
Gym	Planet Fitness	"What's Gotten into Lindsay?"	Lindsay Lohan gets her life back on track
Investments	E-trade	"Off the Grid"	Two executives (Ambika Vas and Brian Calvert) persuade the E-trade baby to return
Loans	Rocket Homes and Rocket Mortgage	"Dream House with Anna Kendrick and Barbie"	Anna Kendrick shows a young girl that Barbie is able to buy her a dream house although there are other bidders for the item.
Medical	Cue Health		A Cue Health test reader (voiced by Gal Gadot) greets other smart devices in a home
Medical	Hologic	"Her Health Is Her Wealth"	Mary J. Blige goes for a health screening. The ad is shown twice.
Online betting	Caesars Sportsbook	"Sit Down Dinner"	Peyton Manning and Eli Manning have dinner with Cleopatra (Halle Berry) and friends
Online betting	DraftKings	"Fortune: Life's a Gamble"	The Goddess of Fortune encourages people to take risks
Online shopping	Rakuten	"High Stakes"	Hannah Waddingham bets a lot on a poker game using household items
Personal care	GilletteLabs razor	"A Quick & Easy Shave"	New razor with an exfoliating bar
Personal care	Irish Spring	"Stinkiness Is Unwelcome"	A guy is welcomed to a clan until they discover he has an odor
Phone	Google Pixel 6	"Lizzo in Real Tone"	Lizzo says that cameras were not good at capturing darker skin tones with certain lighting conditions until now
Restaurant	Taco Bell	"The Grande Escape"	Doja Cat and others escape clown college
Retail	Sam's Club	"Kevin Hart x Sam's Club VIP"	Kevin Hart enjoys VIP perks at Sam's Club, even though everyone else also gets VIP treatment
Smart speaker	Amazon Alexa	"Mind Reader"	Vignettes with Scarlett Johansson and Colin Jost, who are married, showing Alexa reading their minds
Sports	Prime Video	"Football Is Open"	Promoting Thursday Night Football's movie to Prime Video for 2022
Sports	NFL	"Bring Down the House"	Video game football players pop out of a TV and wreak havoc
Sports	NFL	"We Believe"	Calais Campbell talks about how the NFL benefits the community
Sports	2022 FIFA World Cup (Telemundo)	"Goal"	People perform Andres Cantor's goal call
Streaming service	Disney+	"Disney+ has all the GOATs"	Awkwafina says Disney+ has "the greatest movies and shows of all time". Goats are dressed like characters from Disney films.
Tax service	TurboTax	"Matchmaker"	Characters unmask themselves to become other characters.
Theme park	Universal Studios Florida Velocicoaster ride		Viewers get an opportunity to click on a website for a chance to win tickets to Universal Studios Florida
Travel	Booking.com	"Idris Elba says things"	Idris Elba promotes booking.com
Travel	Expedia	"Made to Travel"	Ewan McGregor talks about stuff that people can get, and whether they would regret buying it compared to the places that they could go.
TV series	NBC	"Stars Agree, NBC is America's No. 1 Network"	TV personalities complain Ted Danson gets to promote NBC and they don't
TV series	American Song Contest (NBC)		TV promo, Kelly Clarkson and Snoop Dogg announced as hosts
TV series	Bel-Air (Peacock)		TV promo
TV series	The Endgame		TV promo
TV series	Joe vs. Carole (Peacock)		TV promo
TV series	Law & Order (NBC)		TV promo for season 21
TV series	Moon Knight (Disney+)		TV promo
TV series	The Lord of the Rings: The Rings of Power (Amazon)		TV promo
TV series	The Thing About Pam (NBC)		TV promo
TV series	Winning Time (HBO)		TV promo
Virtual reality	Horizon Worlds Meta Quest 2	"Old Friends, New Fun"	A retired animatronic dog is rescued from the dump and put in a museum exhibit, but reunites with his bandmates virtually using Horizon Worlds and Meta Quest 2 headsets.
Web hosting	Squarespace	"Sally's Seashells"	Sally (Zendaya) uses Squarespace to sell her seashells out of a 1953–1962 Ford P-3 van in a variant of the tongue twister.
Wireless	T-Mobile	"A Message from Dolly: Do It for the Phones"	Dolly Parton does a PSA, and then hands it off to Miley Cyrus
Wireless	T-Mobile	"Miley sings for the phones"	Miley Cyrus does a "We are the World"-like song to support 5G phones
Wireless	T-Mobile home internet	"Duet for Home Internet"	Donald Faison and Zach Braff, guys from the suburbs, sing about home internet.
Wireless	Verizon 5G	"Goodbye Cable"	"The Cable Guy" (Jim Carrey) tries to sell cable to a customer but she doesn't need it since she has 5G service.

== 2023 (LVII) ==
Product type	Advertiser/product	Title	Plot/notes
Alcohol	Bud Light	"Bud Light Hold"	Miles Teller waits for a representative and grabs cans of Bud Light while dancing to the hold music ("Opus Number One" by Tim Carleton and Darrick Deel) with his wife Kayleigh Sperry.
Alcohol	Busch Light	"The Busch Guide: Shelter"	The Busch Guy explains three things needed for survival: food, drink, and shelter. Sarah McLachlan asks to donate to provide shelter to animals, only to be interrupted that it was the wrong type of shelter and that the animal she is sitting next to is actually a wolf.
Alcohol	Crown Royal	"Thank You, O Canada"	David Grohl gives thanks to all the various contributions Canada has given to the world.
Alcohol	Heineken 0.0	"Shrinking and Drinking, Now You Can!"	Ant-Man (portrayed by Paul Rudd) grabs a bottle of Heineken 0.0 while reading sticky notes warning him not to consume alcohol while being shrunk and not to give alcohol to the ants. Despite this, the ants takes the last bottle of Heineken 0.0 from the fridge that was unlocked.
Alcohol	Michelob Ultra	"New Members Day"	In a parody of Caddyshack, Serena Williams and Brian Cox (riffing on his character Logan Roy from Succession) play a game of golf against each other at the Bushwood Country Club.
Alcohol	Molson Coors	"The High-Stakes Beer Ad"	A fan of Coors Light gets into a bar brawl with a Miller Lite fan over which beer brand the ad should focus on, only to get the spotlight stolen under them by Blue Moon.
Alcohol	Rémy Martin	"Inch by Inch"	Serena Williams delivers her rendition of Al Pacino's character's "Inch by Inch" motivational speech from Any Given Sunday, where it applies to more than just the football team, but a variety of teams.
Beverage	Pepsi Zero Sugar	"Great Acting or Great Taste?"	Ben Stiller plays different roles in different scenes (including reprising his role as Derek Zoolander from Zoolander), saying that the emotions and feelings he is depicting are not real, but just acting. After trying a can of Pepsi Zero Sugar, he asks the audience if his reaction is real or him acting and encourages viewers to try it for themselves.
Beverage	Pepsi Zero Sugar	"Great Acting or Great Taste?"	Steve Martin plays different roles in different scenes, and raises the question of whether it is real or just acting.
Candy	M&M's	"Ma&Ya's"	Maya Rudolph replaces the M&M's characters as the candy's spokesperson, relaunching them as "Ma&Ya's" candy-coated clams.
Car	General Motors Netflix	"Why not an EV?"	Will Ferrell appears in various Netflix Original productions using his electric car.
Car	Jeep Wrangler and Cherokee 4xe	"Electric Boogie"	Several animals dance as a Jeep Wrangler drives through the woods.
Car	Kia Telluride X-Pro	"Binky Dad"	A man realizes that he has forgotten his baby's binky while on vacation with his family and drives back home to get it, gaining national media attention while on his journey.
Car	Ram Trucks	"Premature Electrification"	Various men express their issues about suffering from "premature electrification" - the fear that they are buying an electric vehicle too early.
Car accessories	WeatherTech	"We All Win"	WeatherTech proves the doubters wrong about building factories in America.
Cloud services	Workday, Inc.	"Rockstar"	Real rock stars complain about corporations calling their employees "rock stars".
Concert	U2:UV Achtung Baby Live at Sphere		A flying sphere summons U2 fans to a desert; the ad concludes with a baby in the sphere saying the word "achtung", and announces U2's upcoming concert residency at Sphere in Las Vegas.
Cosmetics	e.l.f.	"eyes. lips. face. sticky."	Jennifer Coolidge notices her makeup accessory is very sticky.
Credit card	Alaska Airlines Visa card	"Jacket"	A tall man tries to book a single ticket, but once informed that companions get a discount fare, reveals he was sitting on top of Funshine Bear (from Care Bears)
Delivery	Amazon	"Saving Sawyer"	A family has been hanging out with their adopted dog Sawyer during the COVID-19 pandemic, but when they return to work and school, Sawyer is left with nothing to do but trash the house. The family order a pet carrier over Amazon, but it turns out it is because they are bringing home a second dog.
Delivery	DoorDash	"We Get Groceries"	Celebs hype up local products at a woman at a grocery store.
Delivery	Uber One	"One Hit for Uber One"	After his assistant states that he doesn't do jingles, P. Diddy imagines auditioning singers Montell Jordan, Donna Lewis, Kelis, Ylvis and Haddaway to sing the jingles for Uber One.
E-commerce	Rakuten	"Not So Clueless"	Alicia Silverstone reprises her role as Cher Horowitz from Clueless debating about online shopping.
E-commerce	Temu	"Shop Like a Billionaire"	A woman looking for her clothes from the website's offerings.
Film	Air: Courting a Legend		Movie promo
Film	Cocaine Bear		Movie promo
Film	Creed III		Movie promo
Film	Dungeons & Dragons: Honor Among Thieves		Movie promo
Film	Fast X		Movie promo
Film	The Flash		Movie promo
Film	Guardians of the Galaxy Vol. 3		Movie promo
Film	Indiana Jones and the Dial of Destiny		Movie promo
Film	Scream VI		Movie promo
Film	The Super Mario Bros. Movie		Movie promo
Film	Transformers: Rise of the Beasts		Movie promo
Food	Avocados From Mexico	"Make It Better"	In the Garden of Eden, Eve (Anna Faris) had taken a bite of the forbidden fruit, causing Adam to realize he is naked and flee, but then a groundhog offers her an avocado instead. Fast forward to present day New York City where everyone is walking around naked and unashamed.
Food	Hellmann's/Best Foods Mayonnaise	"Who's in the Fridge?"	A miniature Jon Hamm and Brie Larson get stuck in a fridge and realize that they are there because of their names (ham and brie, respectively). They are interrupted by Pete Davidson opening the fridge, who "eats" them by making a ham and brie sandwich.
Food	Doritos BBQ	"Jack's New Angle"	Jack Harlow gives up his rap career, and popularizes the triangle. Also stars Missy Elliott and Elton John
Food	Planters	"Made to Be Roasted"	Several comedians "roast" Mr. Peanut.
Food	PopCorners	"Breaking Good"	Walter, Jesse, and Tuco from Breaking Bad share a bag of PopCorners.
Food	Pringles	"Best of Us"	A guy gets his hand stuck in a Pringles container and is told by his grandfather that it happens to the best of us, and then shows other folks in different occupations with their hand stuck in the container. It even happens to his fetus cousin Timmy.
Franchise	Disney	"Disney 100 Special Look"	A promo celebrating The Walt Disney Company's centennial year.
Information security	CrowdStrike	"Troy"	A CrowdStrike worker prevents the Trojan Horse from making it inside the Gates of Troy, by running a scan and detecting the giant horse as a threat.
Internet	Xfinity	"Movie Date / Red Flags"	At a stay-at-home movie date, the guy reveals that he doesn't have home internet, and the girl starts noticing a bunch of red flags around the home.
Internet	Xfinity	"Xfinity 10G Network, The Next Giant Leap"	Astronauts landing on the moon meet a group of young people who tell them they're characters in a video game.
Investments	e-Trade	"Wedding"	The e-Trade babies attend a wedding of their peers.
Laundry detergent	Downy Unstoppables	"Downy McBride"	Danny McBride emerges from a hoodie he had hidden himself inside to prove whether Downy Unstoppables' scent could last for 12 weeks.
Medical	Dexcom G7	"Feels Like Magic"	Nick Jonas talks about using Dexcom products to monitor his blood sugar levels.
NFL	NFL	"Run With It"	During an interview with flag football player Diana Flores, Erin Andrews attempts to snatch her flag belt, but Flores runs off, leading others to chase her through town. She eventually returns home where her mother also makes an attempt.
NFL	NFL	"We See You"	NFL players talk about how the NFL is helping out the community.
NFT	Limit Break		Shows a QR code offer for NFTs about a new online game
Online gambling	DraftKings	"Kevin's Bet"	At a house party, Kevin Hart promotes that customers can receive a free bet on DraftKings; the ad segues between scenes of different guests by using dialogue incorporating their names (including Ludacris, Big Papi, The Undertaker, and Tony Hawk).
Online gambling	FanDuel	"FanDuel Kick of Destiny"	In a live commercial, Rob Gronkowski attempted to make a field goal kick for a chance for FanDuel users to split $10 million if they wagered at least $5 on Super Bowl LVII. When attempted, the kick was unsuccessful.
Outdoor retail	Bass Pro Shops & Cabela's	–	
Pet food	The Farmer's Dog	"Forever"	A puppy grows up alongside his owner, watching as she becomes an adult, goes off the college, gets married, and has a child of her own.
Phone	Google Pixel 7	"Fixed on Pixel"	Featured editing unwanted people and objects out of the photos
Religious	He Gets Us	"Be Childlike"	Black-and-white photo montage of children getting along.
Religious	He Gets Us	"Love Your Enemies"	Black-and-white photo montage of people shouting and arguing at each other.
Restaurant	Dunkin'	"Drive-Thru"	Ben Affleck works part-time at a Dunkin' drive-through, surprising customers. His day of work is interrupted by his wife Jennifer Lopez, who unexpectedly shows up at the drive-thru and expresses surprise at seeing Affleck working there.
Shoes	Skechers	"Sketches x Snoop Dogg Big Game Commercial"	Snoop Dogg promotes Skechers Slip-ons.
Streaming service	Paramount+	"Stallone Face"	Characters from Paramount's television and film characters assemble together to talk about climbing the Paramount Mountain, which contains a giant carving of Sylvester Stallone's face. The real Stallone, who is hanging off the carving, falls after the carving of Stallone's face sneezes.
Streaming service	Tubi	"Rabbit Hole"	Large rabbits drag people out from where they are and throw them down a hole. The ad won the Super Clio from the Clio Awards.
Streaming service	Tubi	"Interface Interruption"	Appearing as if the commercial break ended, the ad was taken over, switching over to the Tubi TV app to watch Mr. & Mrs. Smith.
Streaming service	Tubi	"Gardener"	A shorter ad where a woman finds a gigantic carrot with a bite taken out of it, and sees one of the large rabbits from "Rabbit Holes" ad.
Tax preparation	TurboTax	"Dancer"	An elderly gentleman dances to "The Safety Dance" in front of a fountain.
TV series
TV series	Accused (Fox)		TV promo
TV series	Animal Control (Fox)		The host offers a QR code to get more information
TV series	2023 Daytona 500 (Fox)		TV promo
TV series	Farmer Wants a Wife (Fox)		TV promo
TV series	Full Swing (Netflix)		In a continuation of the Caddyshack parody, Tony Romo as Carl Spackler asks what the folks are watching on the Caddyshack golf bag, and a woman talks about Full Swing.
TV series	Gutfeld! (Fox News)		Greg Gutfeld films an ad proclaiming him to be the "new king of late night" (accompanied by his dog Gus and regular panelsts Kat Timpf and Tyrus), but is quickly cut off because of how expensive the ad time is.
TV series	The Masked Singer (Fox)		TV promo for season 9
TV series	Next Level Chef (Fox)		TV promos
TV series	Poker Face (Peacock)	"Charlie Calls Bullsh*t"	Charlie Cale (Natasha Lyonne) chats with another person at a bar while talking about past commercials from the game as well as an ad on the show itself.
TV series	USFL on Fox		TV promos
TV series	WWE Smackdown (Fox)		A pen clicking leads to a bunch of brawling at the library.
Travel	Booking.com	"Somewhere, Anywhere"	Melissa McCarthy sings a musical number about Booking.com.
Wireless	T-Mobile	"Bradley Cooper and His Mom Attempt A T-Mobile Commercial"	Bradley Cooper tries to do an ad with his mother.
Wireless	T-Mobile Home Internet	"New Year, New Neighbor"	John Travolta sings "Summer Nights" from Grease with his new neighbors Zach Braff and Donald Faison about high speed internet.
Website	Squarespace	"The Singularity"	Adam Driver goes into an existential crisis when he learns that Squarespace is a website that makes websites. Going to a desert to calm down, he realizes that Squarespace is technically capable of creating itself, causing numerous other clones of Driver to appear and multiply until it collapses on itself and a black hole appears, sucking in all the clones and leaving only the original Driver behind.

== 2024 (LVIII) ==
Ads listed here are mainly per the criteria posted at Super Bowl Ad Meter, which considered national ads from first kickoff through the 4th quarter two-minute warning including halftime. Ad Meter disregarded house promotions for its cable/broadcast networks, regional to major market, digital platform-only, and broadcasts outside the national CBS broadcast. As the game went into overtime, Ad Meter disregarded ads that played at end of regulation.

Product type	Advertiser/product	Title	Plot/notes
Cosmetics and personal care	CeraVe	"Michael CeraVe"	Michael Cera attempts to take credit for the development of CeraVe moisturiser because it has "Cera" in its name.
Cosmetics and personal care	Dove	"Hard Knocks"	Starts with footage of girls falling down and taking bumps while playing sports, then shows the message "45% of girls quit sports by age 14" and "Together we can keep them in the game. Join the Body Confident Sport program".
Cosmetics and personal care	e.l.f.	"In e.l.f. We Trust"	Judy Sheindlin presides over Judge Beauty—a court show dealing in cases involving cosmetics.
Car	BMW	"Talkin' Like Walken"	As he goes about his day, Christopher Walken repeatedly gets accosted by various people trying to emulate his distinct style of speaking, much to his annoyance.
Car	Volkswagen	"An American Love Story"	Celebrates the 75th anniversary of Volkswagen. Starting with black-and-white styled footage of the cars being introduced in 1949, and later videos of owners enjoying various Volkswagen vehicles. Features Neil Diamond's song "I Am... I Said".
Car	Toyota Tacoma	"Dareful Handle"	As people drive aggressively off-road, the passengers grip the handle in fear and make remarks that the announcer repeats as nicknames for the handle.
Car	Kia EV9	"Perfect 10"	A young figure skater participates in a regional competition, being cheering on by her father, but there is a noticeable empty seat next to him. After driving home, the dad uses the EV9's power station to light up an icy pond and speakers so she can perform in front of her wheelchair-using grandfather.
Car	Kawasaki Ridge	"Mullets"	As two friends start driving a Ridge, they grow mullets and go through some backcountry trails. They pass animals, which also grow mullets. They even pass Stone Cold Steve Austin.
Film	Bob Marley: One Love		Movie promo
Film	Deadpool & Wolverine		Movie promo
Film	Despicable Me 4		Movie promo
Film	Dune: Part Two		Movie promo
Film	The Fall Guy		Movie promo
Film	Godzilla x Kong: The New Empire		Movie promo
Film	IF		Movie promo
Film	Inside Out 2		Movie promo
Film	Kung Fu Panda 4		Movie promo
Film	Kingdom of the Planet of the Apes		Movie promo
Film	A Quiet Place: Day One		Movie promo
Film	Twisters		Movie promo
Film	Wicked		Movie promo
Food	Doritos	"Dina & Mita"	Jenna Ortega goes to the supermarket with her grandmothers, Dina and Mita, with the intention of getting a bag of Doritos Dinamita. After learning that the last bag has already been bought by Danny Ramirez, Dina and Mita fight with Ramirez to retrieve the bag from him. The grandmothers are eventually successful but get upstaged by Ortega, who takes the bag for herself.
Food	Dunkin' Donuts	"The DunKings"	Ben Affleck decides to launch a new career as a pop star, despite his own incompetence at anything related to music and the advice of people trying to dissuade him. He interrupts his wife Jennifer Lopez's recording of her latest album to promote the DunKings, the new boy band that he has formed with his friends Tom Brady and Matt Damon. Lopez shuts down Affleck's attempt to get him to sing a track on the album, but lets Brady stay.
Food	Drumstick	"Doctor on the Plane"	Eric André is boarding on a plane but the flight attendant found out that he got sick until a plastic doll named Dr. Umstick gives him and everyone a Drumstick ice cream as a cure on board.
Food	Oreo	"Twist On It"	Similar to flipping a coin, people make decisions by twisting an Oreo cookie to see which wafer continues to adhere to the cream filling.
Food	Lindt	"Life is a Ball"	Playing to Perry Como's performance of "Round and Round", a Lindor chocolate follows along the song's lyrics as people trying out the chocolate, along with a brief glance of the chocolate-making process.
Food	Reese's Caramel Big Cups	"Big Cups YES!"	Viewers at a suburban living room alternate between being extremely upset and extremely ecstatic when they hear what Reese's is doing with their peanut butter cups.
Food	M&Ms	"Almost Champions Ring of Comfort"	The M&M characters use the peanut butter present in Peanut Butter M&Ms and form them into diamonds via compression. The diamonds are used to create an "Almost Champions Ring of Comfort" to award football players who almost won Super Bowls, as well as Scarlett Johansson, who lost two Oscar races in the same year.
Food	Pringles	"Mr. P"	After a grocery store employee notes that he looks like "the Pringles guy", a mustachioed Chris Pratt begins to trend on the Internet, leading to him landing a role in a film about the Pringles mascot, Mr. P.
Food	Hellmann's/Best Foods	"Mayo Cat"	Kate McKinnon, unsure of what to do with her leftovers, is helped by her cat who points to a jar of Hellmann's mayo. The cat becomes a phenomenon, with everyone scrambling to buy Hellmann's mayo due to the cat's advice.
Food	Nerds Gummy Clusters	"Flashdance...What a Feeling"	A large gummy nerd performs the "Flashdance... What a Feeling" audition dance. Also features Addison Rae.
Insurance	State Farm	"Like a good neighbaaa" "Agent State Farm"	Arnold Schwarzenegger plays a State Farm agent in a blockbuster film, but struggles to pronounce the word "neighbor" correctly while filming his scenes due to his heavy Austrian accent, despite help from the director and Jake from State Farm. Eventually, the production comes a compromise by having Danny DeVito say the line instead. This ad topped the Ad Meter survey.
Online gambling	FanDuel	"Kick of Destiny 2"	Carl Weathers, John Cena, and several others watch TV to see Rob Gronkowski attempting to kick a field goal. It had been adjusted at the end to honor Weathers who died.
Online gambling	BetMGM	"Tom Has Won Enough"	Vince Vaughn promotes BetMGM as the sports betting service for everyone but Tom Brady, since he's already "won enough".
Retail	Bass Pro Shops	"Making Memories on the Water"	Promotes Tracker fishing and pontoon boats.
Pharmaceutical	Pfizer	"Here's to Science"	Various paintings, sculptures, and photographs of members of the science community lip synch to Queen's Don't Stop Me Now.
Restaurant	Popeyes	"Popeyes Finally Has Wings"	Howie (played by Ken Jeong) was released from a fifty-year cryosleep when a group scientists gave him a box of Popeyes wings while he discovers the future such as kick scooters, drones, etc.
Shoes	Skechers	"There's No 'T' in Skechers"	Mr. T shows Tony Romo how he wears Skechers Slip-Ins where there's no "T" in Skechers.
Beverage	Starry	"Love Triangle"	Ice Spice appears with Starry mascots, Lem and Lime, before being confronted by her ex, lemon lime soda (represented by a man wearing a blurred out t-shirt, supposedly for Sprite), and tries to plead her to return. Ice Spice, however, tells him that she is now with Starry, resulting in her ex having a meltdown, with lemon lime soda spewing out of his head like a geyser.
Beverage	Mountain Dew Baha Blast	"Having a Blast"	Aubrey Plaza talks about having a blast where she is in different exciting scenarios yet still acting deadpan.
Beverage	Poppi	"The Future of Soda is Now"	With major inventions happening throughout history, Poppi wants you to rethink flavored soda.
Beverage	Bud Light	"Easy Night Out"	The Bud Light Genie fulfills wishes.
Beverage	Coors Light	"The Return of the Coors Light Chill Train"	The Coors Light Chill Train makes its return after 12 years, passing and freezing folks along the way and eventually crashing through the living room of a family, where it is revealed LL Cool J is the conductor.
Beverage	Budweiser	"Old School Delivery"	In a snowy day, a hitch was set up with the Budweiser Clydesdales to deliver beer a bar that lost power during a snow storm.
Beverage	Michelob Ultra	"Superior Beach"	Lionel Messi plays beach soccer while waiting for the Michelob Ultra draft tap to be changed. Also has cameos from Jason Sudeikis and Dan Marino.
Television	The Boys	"A Love Letter to America"	Homelander shows a message to fellow Americans in a fictional commercial for an Energy drink called Turbo Rush.
Television	NFL Sunday Ticket	"Migration"	Birdwatchers follows along Baltimore Ravens, Seattle Seahawks, and Philadelphia Eagles players in bird-like behaviors as the migrate away while the NFL season concludes.
Television	Paramount+	Knuckles	Movie promo
Television	Paramount+	"Hail Patrick"	In order to ascend Paramount Mountain, Patrick Stewart changes into old football gear and throws Arnold Shortman (Hey Arnold!). Also features Tua Tagovailoa, Drew Barrymore, Knuckles, Lt. Jim Dangle (Reno 911, Thomas Lennon), and Creed.
Television	FX	Shogun	TV promo
Wireless	T-Mobile	"Auditions"	Various actors (Bradley Cooper and his mother, Patrick J. Adams and Gabriel Macht, Laura Dern, Jennifer Hudson, and Common) audition to get Magenta status for T-Mobile.
Wireless	T-Mobile	"That Home Internet Feeling"	Zach Braff and Donald Faison sing "Flashdance...What a Feeling" with their new neighbor Jason Momoa to celebrate Momoa getting home internet, while Jennifer Beals looks on in approval.
Wireless	Verizon	"Can't B Broken"	Beyoncé attempts to break the Internet by doing increasingly over-the-top stunts to no avail, ending with her asking to "drop the new music".
Wireless	Google Pixel 8	"Javier in Frame"	Despite being visually impaired, Javier is able to use his camera phone to take pictures as the phone prompts him that there are faces in the frame. Stevie Wonder narrates the ad.
Website	Squarespace	"Hello Down There"	A group of aliens land on Earth, only to be ignored by the human populace who are too busy looking at their phones to care. To get the humans' attention, the aliens decide to make a website about themselves and broadcast it to every screen on Earth, including that of Martin Scorsese.
Website	Etsy	"Thank you, France"	As France delivers the Statue of Liberty, the Americans look to Etsy's "gift mode" to reciprocate. One of the folks suggests cheese and they gift them that on a cheese board.
Website	Apartments.com	"Extraterrestrials"	Fearsome-looking space aliens approach and are asked what their purpose is, but Brad Bellflower (Jeff Goldblum) helps translate that they are looking for apartments and suggests some listings.
Website	doordash.com	"DoorDash All the Ads"	An advertisement showcasing a promotion, in which using the code "DOORDASH-ALL-THE-ADS-2024" at the website Doordash-All-The-Ads.com would enter you in to win items from the previous ads. The promo code then gets insanely long, including all of the products that were advertised.
Website	Disney+	"Well Said" "Well Thank You"	Black text showing quotes from various movies that are available on Disney+ on a white background.
Website	Snapchat	"Less social media. More Snapchat"	Shows various pictures and videos with changing tag lines about more this and less that, with the more this being something fairly negative. Halfway through, it changes the tagline to less this more that, where the more that is more positive. Eventually it emphasizes the phrase "less likes, more love", and "Less social media. More Snapchat."
Services	Homes.com	"Launch" "Now That's Worth Celebrating"	Having taken over his great uncle's company, Luke (Dan Levy) and his assistant Marci (Heidi Gardner) meet with their executive team and assures them that there will be improvements worth celebrating.
Services	homes.com	"Salon" "A Goldmine of Local Intel"	Luke and Marci visit a hair salon where one of the hairdressers talks with her client about the corn festival. Marci discovers her eyebrows have been shaved off.
Services	homes.com	"Mascot" "Quick Question"	Luke, dressed up as the school mascot, interrupts a football huddle to ask questions about the school. Marci does the same from the stands, and they are forced to flee the scene in a helicopter.
Services	E-Trade	"Pickle Babies"	The e-trade babies play pickleball.
Services	Pluto TV	"Couch Potato Farms"	Farmers plant TVs so that they can literally grow couch potatoes.
Services	Crowdstrike	"The Future"	Space aliens enter a small western town. A woman uses Crowdstrike to fend off the "cyberattack".
Services	TurboTax	"Make Your Moves Count"	Quinta Brunson gets help from a tax advisor. Also a QR code to enter a million-dollar sweepstakes.
Services	Uber Eats	"Worth Remembering"	As Jennifer Aniston picks up a delivery, she remarks that in order to remember something, you have to forget something else. David Beckham and Victoria Beckham have trouble remembering what group Victoria was a member of. Jelly Roll forgets that he got his face tattooed. Aniston forgets who David Schwimmer was.
Services	Booking.com	"Tina Fey Books Whoever She Wants to Be"	Having many options in booking.com, Tina Fey can be whatever Tina Fey she can be, so she hires a number of body doubles that do the different adventures. Includes Jane Krakowski and Glenn Close.
Services	Microsoft Copilot	"Watch Me"	Shows various people and statements like "they say I'll never open my own business" but then later the words "but I say" and a woman says "watch me". Then it shows people entering phrases into Microsoft Copilot AI.
PSA	NFL	"Born to Play"	NFL players Saquon Barkley, Justin Jefferson, Cameron Jordan and Jeremiah Owusu-Koramoah visit Accra, Ghana in an effort to inspire kids to play American football.
PSA	Foundation to Combat Antisemitism	"Silence"	Clarence B. Jones, who helped write the draft for Martin Luther King Jr's "I Have a Dream" speech, remarks that all hate thrives on one thing: silence. And the thing to counter that is to stand up to silence and speak out.
PSA	He Gets Us	"Who Is My Neighbor"	Shows pictures of various people, asks "Who is my neighbor?" and replies "the one you don't notice, value, welcome".
PSA	He Gets Us	"Foot Washing"	Shows illustration-like pictures of a person washing another person's feet.
Political	American Values 2024	"American Values"	In an advertisement for the Robert F. Kennedy Jr. 2024 presidential campaign, it reuses the advertisement of his uncle John F. Kennedy's presidential campaign, with images of Robert Jr. replacing images of John.

== 2025 (LIX) ==
Product type	Advertiser/product	Title	Plot/notes
Battery	Duracell	"Tom Brady Reboost"	Tom Brady slumps over during a "broadcast", and has to get his batteries changed.
Beverage	Bud Light	"Big Men on Cul-de-sac Party"	Post Malone, Shane Gillis and Peyton Manning have a cul-de-sac block party.
Beverage	Budweiser	"First Delivery"	A Clydesdale foal is declined from joining the team, but decides to roll a fallen beer keg from a wagon to a bar. This ad won the 37th Super Bowl Ad Meter competition.
Beverage	Coors Light	"Slow Monday"	A bunch of sloths try to get back to work after the big game.
Beverage	Liquid Death	"Safe for Work"	Workers are questioned whether they can drink this on the job.
Beverage	Michelob Ultra	"The Ultra Hustle"	Willem Dafoe and Catherine O'Hara team up to hustle several younger couples through pickleball matches in exchange for beer.
Beverage	Mountain Dew Baja Blast	"Kiss from a Lime"	A seal with the face of Seal sings a themed version of his song "Kiss from a Rose".
Beverage	Cirkul	"You Got Cirkul"	Adam DeVine accidentally orders 100,000 Cirkul bottles from his phone; the company then reveals that it would be randomly giving away 100,000 Cirkul starter kits.
Beverage	Poppi	"Soda Thoughts"	People want soda but don't want the sugar or the buzz. Features social media personalities Alix Earle, Jake Shane, and Rob Rausch.
Beverage	Red Bull	"Flying Penguins"	A penguin tells his father that he can fly because Red Bull gives him wings, but they are disappointed that the drink is frozen. This ad was a remake of the "Penguins" ad from over a decade ago.
Beverage	Stella Artois	"David and Dave: the other David"	David Beckham learns he has a secret twin brother named Dave (played by Matt Damon) in America that he never knew about. The two brothers initially clash due to cultural differences, but bond over their shared athletic abilities and love of Stella Artois.
Car	Ram Trucks	"Goldilocks and the Three Trucks"	Goldilocks (Glen Powell) tries out three different Ram trucks.
Car	Jeep	"Owner's Manual"	Harrison Ford remarks how life doesn't come with an owner's manual but that means we can write our own stories, and that we have the freedom to choose.
Film	F1		Movie promo
Film	How to Train Your Dragon		Movie promo
Film	Jurassic World Rebirth		Movie promo
Film	Lilo & Stitch		Movie promo
Film	M3GAN 2.0		Movie promo
Film	Mission: Impossible – The Final Reckoning		Movie promo
Film	Novocaine		Movie promo
Film	Superman		Movie promo
Film	Smurfs		Movie promo
Film	Thunderbolts*		Movie promo
Cookware	HexClad	"Unidentified Frying Object"	Gordon Ramsay visits an Area 51 kitchen facility where he learns that his HexClad frypan was derived from alien technology.
Food	Coffee-Mate	"Foam Diva"	A guy's tongue (sung by Shania Twain) becomes an entertainer.
Food	Doritos	"Abduction"	A man was eating his Doritos but a tractor beam pulls the bag from him. He then pulls it back until the UFO explodes. In the end, the man shares some chips to the alien who wants the Doritos. Doritos held a contest where they posted several ads and this was selected by fans to show.
Food	Dunkin' Donuts	"DunKings 2: The Movie"	Ben Affleck recruits his younger brother Casey and Bill Belichick as new members of the DunKings, where they participate in a showdown between different fast food coffee brands. At the height of tension between the battling brands, Jeremy Strong arrives as Paul Revere (after having spent several hours of intense preparation to get into character) to deliver a proclamation asking for unity, which proves to be a rousing success as the brands settle down and enjoy some Dunkin' iced coffee together.
Food	Haagen-Dazs	"Not So Fast, Not So Furious"	Dominic Toretto from the Fast & Furious franchise and Letty are cruising on a coastal highway. Tej (Ludacris) pulls alongside and asks what happened to driving furious, and Dom replies, "Not today."
Food	Hellmann's/Best Foods	"When Sally Met Hellmann's" "When Sally Met Best Foods"	Harry Burns and Sally Albright return to Katz's Delicatessen almost thirty-five years after their infamous previous stop at the restaurant. After Sally puts some mayonnaise on her sandwich, she finds it so good that it gets a similarly emotive reaction out of her, prompting Sydney Sweeney to have what she's having.
Food	Lay's	"The Little Farmer"	A girl on a potato farm grows her own potato plant.
Food	Nerds Gummy Clusters	"Wonderful World of Nerds"	Shaboozey eats pack of Nerds while a parade of Nerds march in the French Quarter and he sings "What A Wonderful World".
Food	Oikos	"Surprising Strength"	Juno Temple carries an injured Myles Garrett across a crowded airport to help him catch a flight.
Food	Pringles	"The Call of the Mustaches"	A guy Adam Brody blows into a Pringles can, making a horn-like sound that summons the mustaches from a bunch of celebrities including Nick Offerman, Andy Reid and James Harden.
Food	Reese's Peanut Butter Cups	"Don't Eat Lava"	A park allows people to step away from a stream volcanic lava that's mistaken for Reese's chocolate lava.
Food	Ritz Crackers	"Ritz's Salty Club"	At the Ritz's Salty Club in the Utah salt flats, Aubrey Plaza and Michael Shannon argue over who's saltier. The pair's debate is interrupted by Bad Bunny, whose relatively chipper demeanor confuses them.
Food	Taco Bell	"The Fans"	Photos of "rando" customers enjoying Taco Bell foods. Doja Cat and LeBron James are upset that they were disregarded.
Food	Totino's	"Chazmo Finally Goes Home"	A spacefaring alien bids farewell to two children who have been taking care of him and their respective fathers (Tim Robinson and Sam Richardson), only to get killed after getting crushed by his spaceship's doors.
Footwear	Nike	"So Win"	Footage featuring some of the currently popular women athletes in the US.
Loan	Rocket Mortgage	"Own the Dream"	People are given a chance to buy their first home. Played to the tune of "Take Me Home, Country Roads", the commercial was immediately followed by an in-stadium sing along.
NFL	NFL Foundation	"Somebody"	Montage of NFL athletes interacting with kids from Big Brothers Big Sisters of America, Special Olympics, and the NFL Foundation's InSideOut Initiative. The poem "I am Somebody" by William Holmes Borders is recited.
NFL	NFL Flag 50	"Flag 50"	A high school girl who plays flag football stands up against jocks Chad and Brad. A petition to have girls flag football be a varsity sport.
Online food ordering	Instacart	"We're Here"	Several television commercial mascots work together to deliver a family's necessities.
Online food ordering	Uber Eats	"A Century of Cravings"	Matthew McConaughey suspects that football was created to sell food
Online food ordering	Doordash	"DashPass Math"	A financial advisor tells Nate Bargatze to stop spending money, but Nate tells her he is saving a bunch of money from using DashPass to buy luxuries.
Pharmaceuticals	Pfizer	"Knock Out"	A kid fights cancer like he's training for a boxing match.
Phone	Google Pixel 9 Google Gemini	"Dream Job"	A father prepares to answer job interview questions with prompts by Google's "Gemini Live" AI service.
Phone	T-Mobile Starlink	"A New Era in Connectivity"	T-Mobile is teaming up with Starlink to make sure your emergency messages can get through. This ad topped the EDO TV Outcomes company's list of Most Engaging Super Bowl Ads.
PSA	Novartis	"Your Attention, Please"	Starting as a commercial that seems to focus on breasts, it turns into a PSA where Wanda Sykes asks women to get screened for breast cancer.
PSA	Stand Up to All Hate	"No Reason to Hate"	Snoop Dogg and Tom Brady exchange face-to-face common phrases on why people hate each other, and then Snoop adds that "Man, I hate that things are so bad that we have to do a commercial about it." A 15-second recap spot was aired in the 3rd quarter.
PSA	He Gets Us	"What Is Greatness?"	Photo montage of people in action. Played to the tune "Personal Jesus".
PSA	Dove	"These Legs"	Features a little girl running, but that chances are that she may drop out of sports when she becomes a teen because of body type shaming.
Restaurant	Little Caesars	"Whoa!"	Eugene Levy is surprised enough by Crazy Puffs to make his eyebrows fly away until they come back.
Services	Booking.com	"Get Your Stay Ridiculously Right"	While on vacation, Kermit the Frog and the Muppets visit different hotels that each cater to their unique tastes.
Services	Fetch Rewards	"The Big Reward"	Wes Schroll wants you to download his app and join his livestream to enter a drawing for cash prizes.
Services	OpenAI	"The Intelligence Age"	A pointillism animation style going through technological advances in society.
Services	Hims & Hers	"Sick of the System"	There is an obesity epidemic and that a lot of drugs are not working to help, but claims that their products would.
Services	Homes.com	"Not Saying We're The Best"	Luke (Dan Levy) and Marci (Heidi Gardner) attempt to convince a corporate lawyer to get them to say "homes.com is the best". Despite the lawyer's repeated insistence that they can't say it legally, Luke and Marci try to come up with loopholes by jumbling the words around, saying it in Spanish, whispering it, and hiring Morgan Freeman to say it.
Services	Homes.com	"Still Not Saying We're the Best"	Morgan Freeman goes into his pitch about homes.com being the best, but the lawyer still does not approve. After Luke and Marci try to change the website's domain name to homes.comisthebest.com, the lawyer decides to give up.
Services	NerdWallet	"Genius Beluga"	A hapless tourist on a scenic ferry ride gets aided by a genius beluga whale (voiced by Kieran Culkin) after he drops his phone into the ocean, who recommends that he use NerdWallet for financial advice.
Services	Papaya Global	"Tackle workforce payments with Papaya Global"	A guy plays whack-a-mole with people's heads popping out stating different workforce payment problems.
Services	WeatherTech	"Whatever Comes Your Way"	Four old ladies go on a road trip, play bingo, breakdance, and go to the beach, to the tune of "Born to Be Wild".
Services	Agentforce by Salesforce	"Gate Expectations"	Matthew McConaughey rushes around the airport.
Services	Agentforce by Salesforce	"Dining Afiasco"	Matthew McConaughey winds up reserving an uncovered outdoor table while it is raining.
Smart glasses	Ray-Ban Meta	"The Artist"	Chris Hemsworth and Chris Pratt examine a pricy statue of a guy at a table, and try to pose along with it until they accidentally knock the head off.
Smart glasses	Ray-Ban Meta	"Hey Meta", Who Eats Art?"	Chris Pratt examples and asks Meta about the banana duct taped to wall art "Comedian". Then Chris Hemsworth comes alongside eating the banana. They scramble to find a replacement but are stopped by Kris Jenner who asks Meta to contact her lawyer.
Streaming service	Disney+ and Hulu	"What If?"	Speculates what might happen if their major characters did not appear in their media.
Streaming service	Tubi	"Cowboy Head"	Follows the story of a boy whose top of his head is shaped like a cowboy hat. He is mocked by the others who have different types of head hats, until his western movie genre starts becoming popular. A 15-second followup spot aired in the 3rd quarter.
Tax preparation	TurboTax	"Now Taxes Is So Sweet"	Issa Rae tries to do her taxes the old-fashioned way.
TV series	2025 IndyCar Series (Fox)	"This Is Pato O'Ward"	Promo
TV series	2025 IndyCar Series (Fox)	"This Is Josef Newgarden"	Promo
TV series	The Z-Suite (Tubi)		Promo
TV series	Multiple Fox-based series (Fox)		Promos for The Masked Singer, Fox News, Extracted, Martin Scorsese Presents: The Saints, United Football League spring season, 2025 Daytona 500, Yellowstone to Yosemite with Kevin Costner
Toilet paper	Angel Soft	"The Big Game Potty-Tunity"	Angel tells people to go to the bathroom while a 30-second timer counts down.
Travel	MSC Cruises	"Let's Holiday"	Orlando Bloom and Drew Barrymore talk about the perks of going on the cruise.
Various products	Bosch	"The More You Bosch"	Antonio Banderas likes using Bosch products as it makes him feel different. Using Bosch power tools makes another guy feel like Macho Man Randy Savage
Website	GoDaddy	"Act Like You Know"	After demonstrating how actors are skilled at pretending to be something they're not, Walton Goggins uses GoDaddy to make a website for his business, Walton Goggins' Goggle Glasses.
Website	Squarespace	"A Tale as Old as Websites"	In a spot inspired by The Banshees of Inisherin, Barry Keoghan delivers laptops as if they were newspapers to a small town in the Irish countryside, helping the populace make websites so they can start their own businesses.
Website	Yahoo	"Email Bill Murray"	Bill Murray invites viewers to email him.

== 2026 (LX) ==
Product type	Advertiser/product	Title	Plot/notes
AI	Oakley Meta	"Artificial Intelligence is Here-Part One"	
AI	Oakley Meta	"Artificial Intelligence is Here-Part Two"	
AI	Anthropic	"Can I Get a Six-pack Quickly?"	
AI	OpenAI	"You Can Just Build Things"	
AI	Base44	"It's App to You"	An office worker uses the AI powered platform to build a custom application, which triggers a domino effect as coworkers begin designing their own software, including inventory tracker and a dog dating app. The commercial focuses on the concept of a "builder's high", the excitement and viral spread of user driven digital creation within a workplace.
Beverage	Liquid I.V.	"Take a Look"	Many toilets, urinals, drains, and a dangling portable toilet sing "Against All Odds (Take a Look at Me Now)".
Beverage	Michelob ULTRA	"The ULTRA Instructor"	Gregory (Lewis Pullman), a young man on the ski slopes with his friends, is forced to buy beer for the rest of his friend group since he always he ends up last in skiing. At a bar, a disheartened Gregory meets an old master (Kurt Russell) who agrees to teach him how to ski through a rigorous training schedule. After mastering the sport, Gregory is no longer the laughingstock of his friends and ends up finishing first the next time they go out skiing. When the friends go out for a beer afterward, they find that Russell already paid their tab.
Beverage	Pepsi	"The Choice"	A Coca-Cola polar bear takes the Pepsi Challenge and discovers that he prefers Pepsi to Coca-Cola. The bear laments about his finding to a therapist (Taika Waititi) beginning to question reality. After meeting a fellow polar bear who also prefers Pepsi, the polar bear attends a Queen concert with his new friend. The two are exposed enjoying Pepsi while broadcast on the kiss cam, but decide to embrace the situation and happily drink Pepsi as "I Want to Break Free" plays.
Beverage	poppi	"Make it poppi"	In a college classroom, a bored young student drinks a can of Poppi, which causes a rift in the space-time continuum that makes Charli XCX and Rachel Sennott magically apparate in the classroom. After Sennott gets the situation explained to her, she and Charli introduce the students to "vibes" and encourage them to have fun.
Beverage	Svedka	"Shake Your Bots Off"	Svedka's Fembot mascot goes clubbing in the first Super Bowl ad primarily generated by AI.
Cars	Cadillac	"Cadillac Formula 1 Team 2026 Livery Reveal / The Mission Begins"	
Cars	Volkswagen of America	"The Great Invitation: Drivers Wanted"	
Cars	Toyota	"Where Dreams Began"	
Cars	Toyota	"Superhero Belt"	
Crypto	Coinbase	"Everybody Coinbase"	A 30-second clip of "Backstreet's Back" plays as the lyrics display karaoke-style.
Food	Dunkin'	"Good Will Dunkin'"	Ben Affleck portrays Will Dunkin' in a 1990s sitcom parody of Good Will Hunting. The commercial also features 1990s sitcom stars such as Jason Alexander, Jennifer Aniston, Jasmine Guy, Alfonso Ribeiro, Matt LeBlanc, Ted Danson, and Jaleel White. Former football player Tom Brady also appears in the commercial.
Food	Hellmann's	"Sweet Sandwich Time"	Meal Diamond (Andy Samberg) leads a group of diner patrons in a musical parody of Neil Diamond's "Sweet Caroline". The initially lighthearted song about sandwiches takes a darker turn as Diamond cheerfully laments that he cannot leave the diner and does not even know who his parents are. After the song finishes, he asks Elle Fanning to marry him so that he can escape, which she politely turns down.
Food	Kinder Bueno	"Yes Bueno 2026"	
Food	Pringles	"Pringleleo"	Fed up by too many unsuccessful relationships with men, Sabrina Carpenter makes her own "man" out of Pringles and falls in love with him even though his fragile physical state means that he falls apart constantly. During a night out, a group of crazed fans crash into him and begin to eat his body of Pringles; Carpenter eats him too.
Food	Nerds Juicy Gummy Clusters	"Taste Buds"	Andy Cohen makes friends with a giant Nerds gummy and gives him a makeover followed by going to a red carpet.
Food	Ritz	"Ritz Island"	
Film	The Further Mis-Adventures of Cliff Booth		Movie promo
Film	Disclosure Day		Movie promo
Film	Hoppers		Movie promo
Film	The Mandalorian and Grogu		Movie promo
Film	Michael		Movie promo
Film	Minions & Monsters		Movie promo
Film	Project Hail Mary		Movie promo
Film	Scream 7		Movie promo
Film	Supergirl		Movie promo
Film	The Super Mario Galaxy Movie		Movie promo
Film	Toy Story 5		Movie promo
Insurance	State Farm	"Stop Livin' on a Prayer"	Two agents for Halfway There Insurance (Danny McBride and Keegan-Michael Key) attempt to sell Hailee Steinfeld a cut-rate policy to the tune of "Livin' on a Prayer," before Jon Bon Jovi and Jake from State Farm arrive in a convertible to rescue her. Katseye appears as a troupe of backing dancers.
Medical	Boehringer Ingelheim	"Mission: Detect the SOS"	
Medical	Hims & Hers	"Rich People Live Longer"	
Medical	MAHA Center Inc.	"MAHA Real Food by Mike Tyson"	
Medical	Novo Nordisk	"A New Way to WeGovy"	
Medical	Novartis	"Relax Your Tight End"	
Online food delivery	Grubhub	"The Feest"	A group of dinner guests at a fancy dinner party who refuse to pay the fees charged at the end of the meal learn from fellow guest George Clooney that Grubhub will now pay the fees.
Online food delivery	Instacart	"Bananas" / "For Papa!"	Italian brothers Gary (Ben Stiller) and Johnny (Benson Boone) film a music video for a peppy eighties-style pop song about how Instacart can deliver bananas. Halfway through the song, Johnny does a signature Boone backflip. Gary is jealous and tries to replicate the feat but injures himself. Undeterred, Gary gets to higher ground and ignores Johnny's protests, invoking their deceased father and insinuating that he was always the favorite. Gary jumps from a much higher vantage point and tries to flip, only to crash and land on a drum kit. After Johnny helps him get back up, a dazed Gary hallucinates seeing their father and proceeds to fall off the stage.
Online food delivery	Uber Eats	"Hungry for the Truth"	Matthew McConaughey repeatedly accosts Bradley Cooper about his conspiracy theory that football is just a way to trick consumers into buying food. Cooper, who is none too pleased by his new companion, eventually lashes out at McConaughey while at a party and gets his lawyer to file a restraining order against him. Parker Posey, Tramell Tillman, Amelia Dimoldenberg, and Addison Rae also star.
Online gambling	DraftKings	"DraftKings Live-ish Super Bowl LX"	
Online gambling	Fanatics Sportsbook	"Bet on Kendall with Fanatics Sportsbook"	
PSA	Blue Square Alliance Against Hate	"Sticky Note"	
PSA	NFL	"You are Special"	
PSA	NFL	"Champion"	
Religious	He Gets Us	"More"	
Services	Homes.com and Apartments.com	"Can't Live There"	Marci (Heidi Gardner) and Brad Bellflower (Jeff Goldblum) show how Homes.com and Apartments.com have so many listings that it is easier to list the places which are inhabitable including an airplane tarmac, a decommissioned Soviet space shuttle, and a desert during a sandstorm.
Technology	Amazon Alexa	"Alexaaaa+"	
Technology	Ring	"Search Party from Ring / Be a Hero in Your Neighborhood"	
Telecommunications	Google	"New Home"	
Telecommunications	T-Mobile	"Tell Me Why (T-Mobile's Version)"	T-Mobile indirectly spoofs Taylor Swift releasing its own version of Backstreet Boys's hit song.
Telecommunications	Xfinity	"Jurassic Park... Works"	
Video game	Pokémon	"What's my Favorite? (Pokémon's 30th Anniversary)"	Lady Gaga, Trevor Noah, Jisoo, Charles Leclerc, Lamine Yamal, Maitreyi Ramakrishnan, and Young Miko share their favorite moments about Pokémon on the video game series' 30th anniversary. Several Pokémon including Jigglypuff, Psyduck, Luxray, Eevee, Zygarde, Gengar, and Arcanine are featured.
Website	Salesforce	"MrBeast's Vault"	MrBeast has a maximum security vault containing a million dollars; the screen zooms out showing it to be a giant QR Code.
Website	Squarespace	"Unavailable"	In a palatial house and accompanied only by her assistant, Emma Stone is slowly driven to insanity as she repeatedly tries to register the domain name "emmastone.com", only to find that someone has already claimed it.
Website	Wix	"Wix Harmony: The New Way to Create"	An independent businesswoman creates a website for an artisanal furniture restoration business using Wix.
	TurboTax	"The Expert"	
Clothing	Levi's	"Backstory"	
	Universal Resort	"Lil Bro"	
	Bosch	"Justaguy"	Guy Fieri, who is nearly unrecognizable without his beard, stars.
	Dove	"The Game is Ours"	
	Rocket and Redfin	"America Needs Neighbors Like You"	
