= Porch (company) =

American home improvement review website

Porch Group, Inc.
- Company type: Public
- Website type: Consumer service
- Available in: English
- Traded as: Nasdaq: PRCH
- Headquarters: Seattle, Washington, United States
- Area served: United States
- CEO: Matt Ehrlichman
- Key people: Asha Sharma (COO)
- Industry: Home improvement
- Services: Online marketplace; Review site
- Revenue: ▲$430 million (2023)
- Employees: 895 (2023)
- Website: porch.com
- Registration: Optional
- Launched: 2012; 14 years ago

Porch is a website that tries to connect homeowners with local home improvement contractors. The site features advice articles, cost guide, and online booking for over 160 home projects.

== History ==
Porch was founded in September 2012 after co-founder Matt Ehrlichman. Porch was launched as an online home improvement network connecting homeowners with professionals.

As of 2018, the listings are in excess of 300,000 professionals across the U.S. Porch partners with Lowe's, Wayfair, and Pottery Barn. Porch offers access to more than 160 different home services offerings through Porch.com associates.

The company facilitated over 2 million home-related projects in 2017, generating almost $1 billion in revenue.

Porch became a public company via a special purpose acquisition company merger in December 2020, and was listed on the Nasdaq.

=== Funding ===
In June 2013, Porch announced a $6.25 million seed round, including investments from Ron Conway of SV Angel, Javier Olivan, and Jeffrey Skoll.

In September 2014, Porch reported a $27.6 million Series A round, led by Lowe's. Joe Hanauer, Chairman of Move and former CEO of Coldwell Banker, joined the board of directors.

In January 2015, Porch reported a $65 million Series B round, led by Valor Equity Partners. Backers included Lowe's, Founders Fund, Battery Ventures, Panorama Point Partners, Capricorn Investment Group and Ty Pennington. Valor Equity Partners’ Antonio Gracias also joined the board of directors.

In January 2020, Porch reported a $21 million Series C round, including investments from Moderne Ventures, Watsco, and existing investors.

In December 2020, as part of its initial public offering, Porch reported a $150 million investment from Wellington Management Company, Scopus Asset Management, and Point72 Asset Management. Gross proceeds from the company's IPO totaled $322 million.

=== Lowe's partnership ===
In April 2014, Porch announced a nationwide partnership with home improvement retailer Lowe's, establishing in-store promotional signage and computer kiosks, with the ability to search for Porch's professionals database.

=== Headquarters relocation ===
In May 2015, Porch relocated their headquarters to the SODO neighborhood in south Seattle, Washington.

=== Acquisition of Fountain Software, inc. ===
In October 2015, Porch announced the acquisition of Fountain, an online communication service. Fountain was co-founded by Aaron Patzer, the founder of Mint.com, and Jean Sini. Sini joined Porch; Patzer did not.

=== Wayfair partnership ===
In April 2016, Wayfair implemented the Porch Retail Solution nationally starting in 15 markets.

=== Layoffs ===
After growing to 500 employees, Porch began a series of layoffs which resulted in the headcount being reduced to about 250 employees. Many key executives, including the Chief Product Officer, Chief Financial Officer, and Chief Technology Officer, left the company.

In April 2018, it was announced that Porch had grown to 450 employees. Porch places a strong emphasis on investing in the 100-person EPDA team (engineering, product, design, analytics).

=== Facebook Marketplace ===
In May 2018, Porch was added as a service provider in the home services category of Facebook Marketplace.
