= Aaron Patzer =

American businessman (born 1980)

- Aaron Patzer in 2018
- Born: November 20, 1980 (age 45); Madison, Wisconsin, United States
- Education: MSEE from Princeton University; BS in Computer Science, Computer Engineering, and Electrical Engineering from Duke University
- Organization(s): Vital Software, Inc.
- Known for: Founder of Mint.com

Aaron Patzer (born November 20, 1980) is an Internet entrepreneur. He is the founder of Mint.com, a financial management tool which was acquired by Intuit in 2009. He was later founder and CEO of Fountain.com, which was sold to Porch.com in 2015. He later founded Vital, a health app, becoming CEO. Patzer holds degrees in computer science and engineering from Duke University and Princeton University.

== Early life and education ==
Born in 1980 in Madison, Wisconsin, Patzer graduated from Central High School in Evansville, Indiana. He completed his undergraduate studies in 2002 with a BSEE from Duke University. His bachelor's degrees were in computer science, electrical engineering and computer engineering. In 2004, he completed an MSEE from Princeton University in electrical engineering.

== Career ==
Patzer began his career in the Internet boom years of 1998–2000, working for Getawebsite.com and Miadora.com (an online jewelry store). Before founding Mint, he was a technical lead and architect for the San Jose division of Nascentric. Previous to that, he worked for IBM and founded PWeb and International, both two web development companies. Patzer helped build the cell microprocessor in the PlayStation 3.

=== Mint.com ===
After a number of engineering positions and Internet startups, Patzer founded Mint.com in March 2006, becoming CEO. According to Patzer, the inspiration for Mint.com came to him in late 2005 after being frustrated with how difficult it was to use Intuit's Quicken product.

Patzer developed the full alpha version of Mint.com (in Java J2EE and MySQL) in 2006 before he met Josh Kopelman (founder of half.com) and Rob Hayes at a STIRR dinner in the fall of 2006. The meeting led to funding, and Patzer launched Mint.com at the TechCrunch40 conference a year later, in September 2007, winning the $50,000 first prize. In September 2008, Patzer was listed in Inc. magazine's Top 30 Under 30.

On September 14, 2009, Intuit announced that it would buy Mint.com for US$170 million. According to TechCrunch, Patzer was criticized in the startup industry for selling the company for too little. At the time of the announced sale, Mint.com had an estimated 1.5 million users. Mint had over 10 million users as of mid-2012.

=== Intuit ===
After the sale of Mint, Patzer joined Intuit as VP Product Innovation and was "tasked with improving Quicken." In 2011 he was working on a new personal transportation system, splitting his time between the new venture and his position at Intuit. In 2011, TechCrunch reported that Patzer's next project would be called "Swift" and was exploring the "feasibility of building a personal maglev vehicle transit system." He left Intuit in December 2012 in order to be able to focus on his new ventures.

=== Leonardo and Fountain.com ===
Patzer founded Leonardo Software Inc. in September 2013.

In 2013, Patzer launched Fountain.com along with Jean Sini, CTO. The software aims to connect users to any expert on mostly any topic for free via smartphones. In early 2015, the software focused solely on home and garden issues. Fountain.com was sold to Porch.com in October 2015. While Sini became the leader of Porch's San Francisco office, Patzer stepped down as CEO and became a Porch product adviser, relocating oversees for personal reasons.

=== Vital Software ===
In January 2017, Patzer relocated to Auckland, New Zealand, to start Vital Software Ltd. Vital is said to "bring that consumer-focused mindset to emergency rooms and hospitals to help them organize patient flow." In 2019, Vital raised $5.2 million in funding, launching on April 24, with Patzer as CEO.

== Personal life ==
In 2015 Patzer had a residence in San Francisco. He had a house in New Zealand as of 2018, where he had also purchased a farm.
