= AwardWallet =

Financial technology companies

AwardWallet, LLC
- Type: Private
- Traded as: AwardWallet
- Industry: travel management, information technology, loyalty programs
- Founded: 2004
- Founders: Alexi Vereschaga
- Headquarters: Bethlehem, Pennsylvania, U.S.
- Website: awardwallet.com

AwardWallet is frequent flyer miles and points tracking site. It is considered to be the first in the genre, founded in 2004, and tracked more than 400 sites as of 2011. AwardWallet is based out of Bethlehem, Pennsylvania. As of 2021, it has 700,000 users, despite some airlines blocking access to the app citing privacy concerns.

In 2012, AwardWallet was involved in a series of disputes with several airlines companies which denied access to AwardWallet's tracking software on their websites.

== History ==
AwardWallet was established in 2004 by Alexi Vereschaga and Todd Mera, two former employees and software engineers from the Aelita Software Corporation. The company began with reward programs by tracking transactions of frequent flyer users and later expanded its services by adding a variety of customer loyalty programs. AwardWallet added a companion mobile application for iOS and Android devices circa 2010/2011.

As of 2021, AwardWallet had over 700,000 members. AwardWallet software has been discussed and cited in travel and technology sections of the media outlets such as The New York Times, BBC, CNN, Bloomberg, Forbes, Entrepreneur, Vox, Los Angeles Times, CNBC, and The Wall Street Journal, among others.

As of 2022, Uber began collaborating with AwardWallet to introduce Uber Travel, a function that allows users to book rides covering their entire trip, including transportation from the airport to the hotel and restaurants. The feature aggregates flight, hotel, and restaurant reservations within the Uber app.

As of 2024, AwardWallet was available on both the Google Play Store and Apple App Store. The service tracks loyalty programs and rewards systems from over 700 travel and retail companies, providing travel alerts, email notifications for flight disruptions, and spending analysis to help users optimize point accumulation.

== Technology ==
AwardWallet's software is equipped with several APIs related to the travel space including an AwardWallet Email Parsing API, AwardWallet Web Parsing API, and AwardWallet Account Access API. For example, Email Parsing API retrieves travel reservations from confirmation emails. Travel reservations are then parsed by the API to return the reservation data in a structured JSON format The AwardWallet Account Access API operates via OAuth protocol. The AwardWallet Web Parsing API retrieves account balance, membership tier, expiration date and more from online accounts. It also provides access to travel itineraries and historical account activity. A number of sources indicate that the AwardWallet software is a part of an emerging API economy.

== Airline companies tracking controversy ==
AwardWallet was a part of controversy related to the denial of the airline companies to have tracking software programs in their API systems. In late 2012, AwardWallet (along with TripIt and MileWise) received a number of cease and desist letters from American Airlines, Delta, United Airlines and Southwest Airlines, demanding that AwardWallet discontinue accessing their websites for tracking clients' miles rewards programs. In August 2013, American Airlines resumed its use of the AwardWallet by integrating its software in the company's API.

== See also ==
- Intuit Mint
- NerdWallet
