= Interface Interruption =

2023 Tubi advertisement

- Excerpt from the advertisement
- Agency: Mischief
- Client: Tubi
- Market: United States national
- Language: English
- Media: Television
- Running time: 15 seconds
- Release date: February 12, 2023
- Directed by: Pete Marquis
- Starring: Kevin Burkhardt Greg Olsen
- Production company: Strike Anywhere
- Country: United States
- Official website: mischiefusa.com/work/interface-interruption

Interface Interruption is a 2023 advertisement for the streaming service Tubi which aired during Super Bowl LVII. The commercial was designed to deceive fans into believing they had accidentally opened the streaming service and interrupted the game as a means of spreading awareness about its existence. It drew mixed reactions.

== History ==
Tubi partnered with the company Mischief to create the fifteen-second commercial with the idea of presenting a "personality" for the streaming service before presenting its title. The CEO of Mischief described that personality as "quirky, playful and a bit unexpected," wanting Tubi to be seen as "the troublemaker of the streaming world." According to Tubi CMO Nicole Parlapiano, this was an attempt at getting their name to have more recognition without having identified the meaning of the brand to viewers and to be memorable. Reflecting on the commercial and the intention behind it, Parlapiano would later say that they were simply trying to avoid embarrassment.

The commercial aired during the fourth quarter of the game. It began by having Kevin Burkhardt and Greg Olsen, the announcers for Super Bowl LVII, talking generally about the game, making it appear as though the commercial break in the broadcast had ended. Tubi's menu then appears before a graphic designed to look like someone is scrolling through the streaming service's library and choosing to watch Mr. & Mrs. Smith (2005). The Tubi logo then appears on the screen as the commercial ends. According to Parlapiano, the advertisement was purposely made short to alleviate concerns from fans watching the advertisement.

Some viewers suddenly became very angry with the person they believed touched the remote, yelling at their partners, children, and restaurant workers. The advertisement began trending on social media as people became angry, and was ranked in the top five trending topics on Twitter during the game. It was the only brand to be trending during this time. Tubi posted the commercial on YouTube, saying in the description that they had successfully deceived their audiences. The Miami Herald described the caption as boasting about the prank.

== Reception ==
The commercial quickly went viral for its deceptive nature and received mixed reactions. Many reports about the commercial such as one from USA Today simply said that fans were confused questioning whether they had simply sat on the remote. Variety described the advertisement as clever and compared it to trompe-l'œil art. According to Business Insider, several people joked about having been tricked by the commercial, praising the marketing strategy and comedy of the commercial.

People criticized the commercial as having started arguments within households, including professional softball player Haley Cruse Mitchell and podcaster Joe Santagato. Rico Bosco, a writer for Barstool Sports, posted on Twitter that he felt Tubi should be sued over the advertisement. The news outlet Today described these reactions as "pure outrage." Today aggregated reactions from fans describing the yelling which ensued from the commercial in households, with some fans saying they needed to mend relationships with their family members due to their reactions. According to Collider, these reactions led to people missing part of the game because they had changed the channel trying to solve what they believed to be a glitch. Collider ranked the commercial in the top spot on their list of worst Super Bowl commercials.

The Mary Sue reported that the advertisement caused anger among some fans, and aggregated posts on social media saying that confusion over the advertisement had caused household disagreements and domestic violence. It condemned the advertisement as dangerous, noting that domestic violence rates tended to increase during sporting events generally and that the commercial would have sparked a further increase.

The controversy led CNN Business to describe the advertisement as one of the most talked about of the night. The Sporting News also argued that, despite the backlash, the commercial marked a victory for Tubi because the company was talked about. Business Insider reported on a Reddit user posting that her boyfriend's angry reaction led to the couple breaking up, a post which inspired online discussions about the dangers of fans' angry reactions on social media.

Tubi viewed the advertisement as successful because it went viral owing it to the humor and shock value of the commercial. Parlapiano even described the risk of the commercial as one that paid off and continued to do so as time progressed. Business Insider claimed that when asked about the negative reactions, Tubi did not respond.

Interface Interruption was brought to the Cannes Lions Awards, where it received the Gold for "Use of Screens", the "Challenger Brand" award in both the Media and Entertainment categories, and the Bronze for "Social Behavior & Cultural Insight" and "Use of Broadcast".

== Follow-up in 2025 ==
In 2025, Tubi created a second commercial, again partnering with Mischief. Parlapiano said that the intention was to bring more emotion into the commercial than Interface Interruption had and that they wanted to honor the popularity of the commercial. The 2025 commercial featured a man who was born with a cowboy hat as part of his head. After the second commercial's release, several news outlets compared the two commercials.
