= List of 1970s Super Bowl commercials =

This is a list of Super Bowl commercials that played during the 1970s. This article does not list advertisements for a local region or station (e.g. promoting local news shows), pre-kickoff and post-game commercials/sponsors, or in-game advertising sponsors and television bumpers.

== 1970 (Super Bowl IV) ==
Product type	Product/title	Plot/notes
Beer	Schmidt's "Beautiful"	At a ski resort, a couple goes downhill skiing together. Everything about this is described as 'beautiful' by the voiceover. During the ride down the slope, the two fall over. The couple then get up and share a Schmidt's beer together.
Car	Pontiac "Humbler"	A driver in a GTO goes through a drive-through at a restaurant. Dramatic music and exhaust noise is heard in the background. He pulls an "exhaust" knob activating the vacuum operated exhaust, drowning out the noise.
Cigarette	Winston "Me and My Winston"	A female singer performs the 'Me and My Winston' jingle in front of a giant Winston cigarette box.
Insurance	New York Life "Happiness"	A New York Life agent offers happiness to a hippy family through life insurance.
Petroleum	American Oil Company "De-Icer"	Thanks to the De-Icer fuel system antifreeze used in his car, that was recommended by his local American Oil station, a man is able to ease his thoughts of starting his car on a cold, snowy morning.
Petroleum	American Oil Company "I'm a Believer"	Various people (including Santa Claus) are seen wearing buttons labeled "I'm a Believer", stating their preference of Amoco lead-free gasoline over competing fuel brands.

== 1971 (V) ==
Product type	Product/title	Plot/notes
Car	Plymouth "Here Comes Cricket"	Adverting the new Plymouth Cricket. Features a Cricket driving inside a circle formed of various Plymouth cars, before parking in a space left open for the car.
Financial services	Oppenheimer Fund "Hands"	Four individual hands flash on the screen one at a time, before coming together and forming the Oppenheimer Funds logo.
Motor oil	STP "Snow"	On a cold and snowy night, Andy Granatelli is able to start his car and drive in the freezing weather, thanks to using STP Motor oil.
Personal care	Personna 74 "Tungsten Steel"	Highlights the usage of tungsten steel for the products line of razor blades.
Shaving cream	Noxzema "Close"	Gunilla Knutsson appears on screen with a can of Noxzema; telling men how close they can get when they "take it off" with Noxzema cream. After she says that, the camera begins zooming up close to her lips. The ad ends with the close of up Knutsson's lips, telling the viewer that this is how close they can get when they use Noxzema.
Tax preparation	H&R Block "John Cameron Swayze"	John Cameron Swayze promotes H&R Block's tax return service.
Tire	Goodyear "Polyglas"	Advertising the Polyglas tire from Goodyear. The ad highlights the tires advantages in mileage, traction, and strength by showing motorists demonstrating these traits while driving.

== 1972 (VI) ==
Product type	Product/title	Plot/notes
Beer	Lone Star Beer "Big Country"	A group of cowboys round up a heard of horses. After getting the job done, they all relax and enjoy a can of Lone Star Beer.
Beer	Pabst Blue Ribbon "Highwheelers"	A group of men ride on vintage high wheel bicycles through a park. The narrator connects this to the old-time taste of Pabst Blue Ribbon beer.
Car	Ford "What You Want"	The head of a board meeting, at the Ford Motor Company, talks about the changes that were made to the Ford Galaxie 500 thanks to listening to customer requests that were sent to the company.
Cigar	Dutch Masters "Latin America"	Several women bring a man, bananas, then a chocolate cake, and finally, Dutch Masters cigars. The narrator for the advertisement describes the items, that were brought to the man, as some of the best tasting and that they have come from Latin America.
Deodorant	Right Guard "Fire Yours"	A man and then a woman talk about the problems with the antiperspirant they use. The narrator of the spot then responds to this, by telling the viewer to fire the antiperspirant they are currently using and hire Right Guard.
Hardware	Black+Decker "Car Building"	Highlights the usage of Black+Decker tools for building automobiles
Hardware	Black+Decker "Charlie Jones"	Charlie Jones talks about the Black+Decker Deluxe Shrub and Hedge Trimmer, for their Super Bowl Special promotion.
Hardware	Black+Decker "Power Tools"	Black+Decker power tools are used to build a skyscraper.
Hardware	Black+Decker "Shurb and Hedge"	Promotes a special offer from Better Homes and Gardens by offering the consumer a pair of books, through a certificate from a purchase of either a hedge trimmer or a two-speed drill assortment
Hardware	Black+Decker "Weekend Chores"	Another Super Bowl Special promotional spot with Charlie Jones; the spot has Jones talking about the Black+Decker two-speed quarter drill assortment
Industry trade group	Foundation for Full Service Banks "Diner"	A man named Mike opens up a diner, thanks to a Full Service Bank.
Insurance	Allstate "Young Mans Insurance"	An adult male spends time at zoo with his son. The narrator informs the viewer, that by using Allstate for life insurance, you do not have to pass away in order to collect money. The narrator of the ad then talks about the company's money back plan and ends the ad referring to Allstate as the young man's life insurance.
Personal care	Gillette "Dry Look"	Shows the before and after appearances of men who use The Dry Look hair spray
Personal care	Gillette "Face Saver"	The ad starts with a man voicing his frustrations about shaving, due to having to shave multiple times against the grain, along with the irritation it causes. The man then talks about how Gillette's Foamy Face Saver shaving cream helps with this problem. Thanks to the lubricating protection from the shaving cream, the man is able shave against the grain, with less irritation.
Personal care	Gillette "Trac II"	A man dressed in a lab coat talks about why the Gillette Trac II razor has two blades and the advantages it has with shaving.
Personal care	Personna 74 "Construction Worker"	At a construction site, a construction worker drills a hole into a beam. The voiceover for the commercial, then talks about how the tungsten steel of the drill bit made the workers tough job easier the same way the same steel used in the Personna 74 razor gives the user the sharpest and longest lasting shave.
Petroleum	ARCO "A Little More Mileage"	A couple is on their way to catch a ferry ride, but the car they are in, runs out of gas. The man driving the car, gets out, walks to his nearest ARCO gas station and fills up a gas can. When he arrives back at the dock, the woman and the car he was with, are on the ferry sailing away from the man.
Soft drink	Coca-Cola "Hilltop"	Several teenagers from around the globe sing on top of a hill in Italy while holding bottles of Coke. The jingle sung in the ad ("Buy the World a Coke") was later adapted to a full-length song (removing the Coca-Cola references) twice, becoming a hit song.
Tire	Goodyear "Radial Tire"	At the Goodyear Test Track in San Angelo, Texas, the Goodyear Custom Wide Tread Radial Tire is put to the test, by placing the tires on a Ford Mustang and slaloming around a set of cones. The car is able to navigate the course, flat and smooth, thanks to the tires.

== 1973 (VII) ==
Product type	Product/title	Plot/notes
Car	Dodge "Any Length"	George Blanda physically stretches a standard Dodge Pickup to form a club cab and then stretches it even further to form a crew cab.
Personal care	Noxzema "Cream Your Face"	Farrah Fawcett sings to Joe Namath and rubs Noxzema shaving cream on his face.
Tire	Goodyear "Steel Guard"	Promoting the Steel Guard Radial Tire from Goodyear; shows five different ways the tire was tested

== 1975 (IX) ==
Product type	Product/title	Plot/notes
Aerospace	Boeing "Almost 60 Years"	Highlights aviation history, starting with the Wright brothers and ending the spot with the Boeing 747
Automotive	DieHard "Car Start"	An adult couple has trouble starting their car, so they resort to borrowing their teenage son's souped up Plymouth Barracuda, equipped with a DieHard battery.
Beer	Budweiser "Skier"	A female skier dressed in a Budweiser sweater, glides down a snowy slop and meets up with some friends to enjoy some Budweiser beer.
Electronics	Zenith "Chromacolor II"	A spokesman reveals that in a survey polled amongst independent service technicians, Zenith color televisions topped in fewest repairs, best picture, and was the brand that most participants said they would buy at present time. Promotes the Chromacolor II television.
Fast food	McDonald's "Big Mac"	People attempt to recite the "Two all-beef patties" Big Mac jingle.
Personal care	Grecian Formula "No Grey"	A wife tells her husband that he looks younger, thanks to using Grecian Formula 16.
Security	Master Lock "Rifle"	A man attempts to break a Master Lock with a rifle. He fails, but does put a bullet hole in the lock.

== 1976 (X) ==
Product type	Product/title	Plot/notes
Automotive	ACDelco "Freedom Battery"	Promotes the Delco Freedom car battery
Beer	Budweiser "Beer Talk - Room For More"	Ed McMahon tells viewers that when it comes to beer, it's better to have a good long drink rather than drinking it sip by sip.
Beer	Miller Hight Life "Miller Time"	When Miller Time approaches, a group of construction workers head to a bar after a long day of work constructing a skyscraper.
Beer	Miller Lite "Rosey Grier and friends"	Retired football players, Ben Davidson, Rosey Grier, and Ray Nitschke, form a knitting club
Car	Ford "Granada"	The Ford Granada is put to the test against the Cadillac Seville and the Mercedes-Benz 280.
Copy	Xerox "Monks"	
Credit card	American Express "Jack Nicklaus"	Jack Nicklaus talks about why he uses an American Express credit card.
Security	Master Lock "Marksman 2"	

== 1977 (XI) ==
Product type	Product/title	Plot/notes
Copy	Xerox "Monks"	A monk must make 500 handwritten scriptures for his boss. He obviously goes to Xerox, and delivers the scriptures. The boss looks to the heavens and says, "It's a miracle".

== 1978 (XII) ==
Product type	Product/title	Plot/notes
Beer	Budweiser "Here Comes The King"	The Budweiser Clydesdales stroll through the snow, while the famed Budweiser-jingle, Here Comes The King, plays.
Beer	Miller High Life	
Car	Ford "Futura"	Space themed spot promoting the Ford Fairmont Futura
Credit card	American Express "Pele"	Pele talks about the American Express Card he uses whenever he travels.
Electronics	RCA "Leslie Caron"	Leslie Caron promotes the RCA ColorTrak television.
Personal care	Gillette	Promotes the Atra Razor
Personal care	Gillette	Promotes Trac II Shave Cream
Personal care	Right Guard	
Tire	BFGoodrich	

== 1979 (XIII) ==
Product type	Product/title	Plot/notes
Airlines	Eastern "Busy Phones"	Frank Borman talks about the computer system that Eastern has implemented, to help improve their call system.
Battery	Eveready "Robert Conrad"	Robert Conrad talks about the Eveready Alkaline Power Cell battery.
Beer	Budweiser "Here Comes The King"	The Budweiser Clydesdales stroll through the snow, while the famed Budweiser-jingle, Here Comes The King, plays. Also aired during Super Bowl XII
Beer	Budweiser "When You've Said It All"	Featuring footage of the Miss Budweiser hydroplane, the Budweiser-sponsored Spyder NF-10 Can-Am car, and the Budweiser Hot-Air Balloon in action
Beer	Miller High Life "Firefighters"	After putting out a big fire, a team of firefighters go to a bar and have a Miller High Life beer.
Beer	Miller Lite "Famous Ex-Quarterbacks"	Retired quarterbacks Terry Hanratty, Charley Johnson, and Norm Snead appear at a table enjoying Miller Lite beer.
Car	Chrysler "Hal Linden"	Hal Linden explains the features and benefits the Chrysler Newport has over the Chevy Caprice.
Car	Chrysler "Neil Armstrong"	Neil Armstrong talks about the engineering advantages Chrysler had made with their cars.
Car	Dodge "Gutsy"	The Dodge Omni 024 is advertised in the ad; details the features associated with the vehicle
Car	Dodge "Rugged"	Promotes the Dodge Omni 024; refers to the overhead cam system as 'rugged'
Car	Dodge "Value You Can Measure"	Spot introducing the Dodge St. Regis; talks about the advantages the car has over the Chevrolet Caprice
Car	Plymouth "Beyond"	Advertisement promoting the Plymouth Horizon TC3; highlights the different options and features for the car
Car	Volkswagen "Pilot"	An airplane pilot talks about why he owns a Volkswagen Rabbit.
Car rental	Avis "Super Saver Rates"	A spokesman talks about the different special rates that Avis offers to its customers.
Computer	IBM "Chip"	Highlights the computer chip used in IBM computers. A spokesman first appears with an enlarged image of the chip before showing the actual chip, which is smaller than the tip of his finger.
Credit card	American Express "Jim Fixx"	While running in Paris, Jim Fixx explains why he uses American Express.
Electronics	Canon "John Newcombe"	A photographer takes photos of John Newcombe with a Canon AE-1 camera. Newcombe then uses the camera to take a picture of a female tennis player.
Electronics	Magnavox "Handing Out Money"	Promotes the Magnavox Annual Sale; informs customers can receive a rebate by purchasing Magnavox products
Fast food	McDonald's "One and Only Taste"	People from all over the country enjoy the "one and only" taste of the Big Mac sandwich.
Financial services	EF Hutton "Joggers"	While two guys are out for a jog, a discussion about the market forms. One runner talks about looking into tax-free incomes, thanks to their broker suggesting it. The other runner talks about his broker being EF Hutton. Before going into detail on what was discussed with his broker, everyone around the two runners stops and listen to what the runner has to say about EF Hutton.
Hotel	Sheraton "Taste"	Dana Valery performs a musical number about Sheraton's hotels.
Insurance	Crum & Forster "Fourth of July"	Fourth of July parades are made possible thanks to Crum & Forster insurance.
Manufacturing	Eaton "Space Shuttle"	Thanks to the microwave system provided by Eaton, a space shuttle is able to land on top of an airplane.
Pulp and paper	Georgia-Pacific "We've Grown"	Highlights the company's expansion into the chemical and oil industries.
Soft drink	Coca-Cola "Hey Kid, Catch!"	A young kid tries to talk to "Mean" Joe Greene by the locker room after a game. Greene is his usual "mean" self until the kid insists Greene has his Coke. After Greene drinks the Coke, he "sweetens" up and offers the kid his jersey, saying, "Hey, kid... catch."
