= Intuit Mint =

Web-based personal financial management service

Mint
- Type: Subsidiary
- Industry: Personal finance, software
- Incorporated: Canada
- Founded: 2006; 20 years ago
- Founder: Aaron Patzer
- Defunct: March 23, 2024
- Fate: Merged with Credit Karma
- Headquarters: Mountain View, California, United States
- Area served: United States, Canada
- Products: Web application, mobile application
- Number of employees: 35; before acquired by Intuit in 2009
- Parent: Intuit
- Website: mint.intuit.com

Mint, also known as Intuit Mint and formerly known as Mint.com, was a personal financial management website and mobile app for the US and Canada produced by Intuit, Inc. (which also produces TurboTax, QuickBooks, and Credit Karma). Mint's primary service allowed users to track bank, credit card, investment, and loan balances and transactions through a single user interface, as well as create budgets and set financial goals.

== History ==
=== Founding and fundraising ===
Mint.com was originally created by Aaron Patzer and provided account aggregation through a deal with Yodlee.

In February 2008, revenue was generated through lead generation, earned via earning referral fees from recommendations of highly personalized, targeted financial products to its users.

Mint raised over $31 million in venture capital funding from DAG Ventures, Shasta Ventures, and First Round Capital, as well as from angel investors including Ram Shriram, an early investor in Google. The latest round of $14 million was closed on August 4, 2009, and reported by CEO Aaron Patzer as preemptive. TechCrunch later pegged the valuation of Mint at $140 million in 2009. It had 35 employees, before it was acquired in 2009.

=== Purchase by Intuit ===
On September 13, 2009, TechCrunch reported Intuit would acquire Mint for $170 million. An official announcement was made the following day.

On November 2, 2009, Intuit announced its acquisition of Mint.com was complete. The former CEO of Mint.com, Aaron Patzer, was named vice president and general manager of Intuit's personal finance group, responsible for Mint.com and all Quicken online, desktop, and mobile offerings. Patzer further added the features of the online product Mint.com would be incorporated into the Intuit's Quicken desktop product, and vice versa, as two collaborative aspects of the Intuit Personal Finance team.

=== Operations under Intuit ===
Mint switched to using Intuit's own system for connecting to accounts after it was purchased by Intuit in 2009. It was later renamed from "Mint.com" to just "Mint". Mint's primary service allowed users to track bank, credit card, investment, and loan balances and transactions through a single user interface, as well as create budgets and set financial goals. In 2010, Mint.com said it could connect with more than 16,000 US and Canadian financial institutions, and to support more than 17 million individual financial accounts. Patzer left Intuit in December 2012. By 2011, Mint had replaced Intuit's Online Quicken product, a process that took place in 2013, with users migrated over.

In 2016, Mint.com reported to have over 20 million users. In 2019, Intuit's consumer sector, consisting largely of Mint and Turbotax, had $2.775 billion in revenue. In 2020, Mint had 13 million registered users. Fast Company criticized the app for having been neglected by Intuit, noting core functionality remained the same, but that the software was not being significantly improved over time. It quoted founder Aaron Patzer saying "in my mind, it's been in maintenance mode the last eight years."

=== Shut down ===
Intuit announced Mint would be shutting down on December 31, 2023, and prompted its users to move to its Credit Karma product. This was later changed to March 23, 2024.

== Mint Bills ==
Mint Bills, formerly Check and before that Pageonce, was a website and mobile banking application developed by Check, Inc which was acquired by Intuit and made a part of Mint in 2017.

Mint Bills utilized proprietary account aggregation technology for secure payment technologies in its mobile applications; its primary service allowed users to pay bills and track bank, credit card, investment, and loan transactions and balances through the Mint Bills website or mobile apps for its Android and iOS platforms. Mint Bills was bought by Intuit in 2014 and integrated into Mint.com in March 2017. The Mint.com bill payment service was then discontinued on June 30, 2018.

=== Check, Inc. ===
Check, Inc., which developed the original Pageonce program later renamed Check, was founded in May 2007 and had offices in Palo Alto, CA and in Israel. Check raised $1.5M in capital investment from Liron Petrushka and Bobby Lent in January 2008, and a further $6.5M from Pitango Venture Capital in December 2009.

=== Intuit ===
In May 2014, Intuit agreed to purchase Check for $360 million; the purchase was expected to occur before July 31, 2014. In December 2014, the transition was completed, and new users installed Mint Bills, while installed Check apps updated automatically to Mint Bills.

In December 2016, Mint began integrating bill tracking payment and functionality into Mint.com and the Mint app. In January 2017, users were notified by email and via notices in their apps that Mint Bills would go away on Mar 26 2017, and its functionality integrated with Mint. The Mint.com bill payment service was discontinued on June 30, 2018.

== Security controversy ==
In 2010, it was reported that Mint asked users to provide both the usernames and the passwords to their bank accounts, credit cards, and other financial accounts, which Mint then stored in its databases in a decryptable format. This raised concerns that if the Mint databases were ever hacked, both usernames and passwords would become available to rogue third parties. Some banks support a separate "access code" for read-only access to financial information, which reduces the risk to some degree.

In January 2017, Intuit and JPMorgan Chase settled a longstanding dispute, and agreed to develop software where Chase customers send their data, for financial purposes, to Mint without having Intuit store customers' names and passwords. It was also agreed Intuit would never sell Chase's customer data.

== See also ==
- AwardWallet
- NerdWallet
- Personal financial management
- Wikinvest
