= List of 1990s Super Bowl commercials =

This is a list of Super Bowl commercials that played during the 1990s. This article does not list advertisements for a local region or station (e.g. promoting local news shows), pre-kickoff and post-game commercials/sponsors, or in-game advertising sponsors and television bumpers.

== 1990 (Super Bowl XXIV) ==
Product type	Product/title	Plot/notes
Car	Chrysler "Lee Iacocca"	Lee Iacocca talks about the guaranteed rebate offered for all Chrysler vehicles.
Car	Nissan "Turbocharged Dream"	A Nissan 300ZX Turbo is challenged by a sportbike, racing car and a jet fighter respectively. Directed by Ridley Scott
Credit card	American Express "The Race"	Paul Newman races a top-fuel dragster on a mini-bike.
Clothing	Nike "Announcers"	
Insurance	New York Life "Friends"	Thanks to being friends with a life insurance agent from New York Life, the next generation of family members are insured.
Restaurant	McDonald's "Homer Alaska"	
Restaurant	McDonald's "Saving the Universe"	
Security	Masterlock "Lock Abuse"	People are unable to break into various locations due to each location being secured by a Masterlock lock. Also aired during Super Bowl XXIII
Soft drink	Coca-Cola "Generations Hilltop Reunion"	
Soft drink	Diet Pepsi "Joe Montana Challenge"	Joe Montana offers any celebrity that has appeared in a Diet Coke commercial, to take a blind taste test and see which tastes better, Diet Pepsi or Diet Coke.
Telecommunications	GTE "Forget"	GTE Workers run through a tunnel like football players. Promotes the company providing the official telecommunications system for the Super Bowl Cast: Dick Enberg & Bob Lilly

== 1992 (XXVI) ==
Product type	Product/title	Plot/notes
Airlines	USAir "Where Are We?"	A father takes his son to a field watch a USAir airliner fly over.
Beer	Budweiser "Dan Marino"	Anti-drunk driving PSA starring Dan Marino
Beer	Budweiser "Scott Pruett"	Anti-drunk driving PSA starring Scott Pruett
Car	Hyundai "Take a Stand""	While the song "Stand by Me" by Ben E. King plays, the narrator describes the company's ValueCare maintenance plan
Car	Isuzu "Car/Rent"	In a perfect world, everyone would have a Ferrari Testarossa or beachfront property. However, this commercial world has people putting stuff on their budgets that would leave little room for car and rent. Luckily, the Isuzu Rodeo exists for such people.
Clothing	Air Jordan "Hare and Air Jordan"	After having trouble sleeping due to a basketball game taking place above him, Bugs Bunny recruits Michael Jordan to get his revenge. Would become the inspiration for the 1996 feature film, Space Jam.
Clothing	Bugle Boy "Golf Course"	While golfing, a man's friends criticize him for "spending time" with his wife instead of golfing with them.
Clothing	Reebok "Dan and Dave"	A five-part saga of two runners who hope to compete in the 1992 Summer Olympics in Barcelona.
Electronics	Magnavox "Go Away"	Actor John Cleese displays a number of the company's latest electronics. As the ad progresses, Cleese appears on the screen or lens of each subsequent product, with some of the Johns becoming increasingly frustrated.
Fast food	McDonald's "The Foods You Want"	The ad describes how McDonald's treats you how you want to be treated, and it ends with the slogan "What you want is what you get."
Film	A Few Good Men	TV promo
Film	Aladdin	TV promo
Film	Basic Instinct	TV promo
Film	Batman Returns	TV promo
Film	The Bodyguard	TV promo
Film	Bram Stoker's Dracula	TV promo
Film	Cool World	TV promo
Film	Home Alone 2: Lost in New York	TV promo
Film	Honey, I Blew Up the Kid	TV promo
Film	Lethal Weapon 3	TV promo
Film	Sister Act	TV promo
Film	Stop! Or My Mom Will Shoot	TV promo
Film	Wayne's World	TV promo
Security	Master Lock "Opera"	Montage of more ne'er-do-wells trying and failing to break through locks made by Master Lock
Soft drink	Pepsi "Cindy Crawford"	Two boys watch Cindy Crawford drive up to a vending machine and drink a can of Pepsi.
Soft drink	Pepsi "Billboard"	This four-part ad describes the fictional narrative of how Pepsi created its new slogan, "Gotta' Have It." In the first 30-second advertisement, a farmer drives his truck off the road and into a Pepsi billboard. The accident conveniently leaves the phrase, "Choice of a New Generation" cut-out as if by hand. In the second advertisement, townspeople are interviewed to describe their feelings about the new Pepsi movement. People gather by the hundreds in an event mimicking the iconic Woodstock festival. In the third advertisement, celebrities including Regis Philbin, Yogi Berra, and Jimmy Connors comment on the popularity of Pepsi, and by the commercial's end, a new slogan is discovered: "Gotta' Have It." The fourth advertisement is in the style of a news report, and it notes the sightings of Pepsi billboards across the country.

== 1993 (XXVII) ==
Product type	Product/title	Plot/notes
Car	Honda Prelude "Slingshot"	The ad was produced by RPA. A 190-horsepower Prelude VTEC goes in reverse and speeds forward like a slingshot.
Car	Lincoln "Highlight Film"	Promoting the Lincoln Mark VIII. Rather than being an advertisement for the car, the narrator tells the viewer to think of the 30-second spot as a highlight film. Several football broadcast techniques like Instant Replay and Slow Motion are used in the ad.
Car	Oldsmobile "100,000 Mile Drive"	Consumers give there testimonials on the advantages that came from driving their Oldsmobile Achieva for 100,000 miles.
Car	Subaru Impreza "Teaser"	The ad was produced by Wieden+Kennedy. six different commercials are used to describe the new Impreza: 1. The Honda Civic has a 3-Channel ABS but the Impreza has a 4-Channel ABS. 2. The Impreza has less trouble starting in cold weather conditions than the Honda Civic by not having a distributor. 3. With a new EJ18 horizontally opposed engine the Impreza does well cornering and has a better weight distribution than the Honda Civic. 4. The Impreza Suspension gives a smoother ride than a Honda Civic which has a double wishbone suspension.; 5. The Impreza TCU is linked with the ECU to provide seamless shifting. 6. The Subaru passenger car has 93 percent of registrations for the last decade which are still on the road, according to the 1991 R.L. Polk & Company Passenger Car Registration Report.; Narrated by Kirstie Alley
Clothing	Lee "Inhale"	A man tries to suck in his stomach to button up his jeans and accidentally inhales his pet canary.
Clothing	Lee "The Date"	A young woman in her bedroom upstairs wearing a white cap sleeved leotard or bodysuit as a top sees her date (Alan Cumming) pulling up. She struggles to get into jeans rolling her hips and jumping up and down while trying to pull on her jeans. Her date sees the silhouette of her through her window and gets excited. As she continues to struggle to get into her jeans she gets one foot tangled in cord of floor lamp then the other and falls into a mannequin. The mannequin lands on top of her and the lights goi out. The guy seeing this thinks she is fooling around with another guy.
Footwear	Nike "Hare Jordan"	Marvin the Martian takes all the Air Jordans on earth and challenges Michael Jordan and Bugs Bunny to a game of basketball with the fate of the earth at stake. The commercial was the inspiration for the movie Space Jam.
Electronics	Magnavox	
Restaurant	McDonald's "Showdown"	Michael Jordan and Larry Bird play an outrageous game of Horse. The prize: A Big Mac.
Retail	ServiStar "Neighbor"	Promotes the hardware store as being a good neighbor with good advice, complete with a jingle
Tire	Goodyear "Indy"	An IndyCar tests in the rain, at the Michigan International Speedway, using Goodyear Eagle Performance street tires.
Tire	Goodyear "Water Skiing"	Thanks to the car being supplied by Goodyear Aquatred Tires, a duo waterskies on less than an inch of water while being towed by the car with the tires on it.

== 1995 (XXIX) ==
Product type	Product/title	Plot/notes
Airlines	Continental Airlines "Bake Sale"	
Airlines	USAir "Earth"	
Analgesic	Dimetapp "Tingles"	
Analgesic	Imodium A-D "The Long Commute"	
Analgesic	Tylenol "Family Relief"	
Beer	Bud Light "Chimp"	
Beer	Bud Light "Dog Show"	
Beer	Budweiser "Bud Bowl VII"	
Beer	Budweiser "Drag Racer"	
Beer	Budweiser "Frogs"	Three frogs are sitting in a swamp sounding out different syllables until they finally croak the name "Budweiser"
Beer	Budweiser "It Has Always Been True"	
Beer	Budweiser "Wild Horses"	
Candy	Snickers "Rich Espinoza"	
Candy	Snickers "Tab Ramos"	
Car	Dodge "We Looked"	
Car	Ford "The Big Game"	
Car	Ford "Truck Football"	
Car	Honda "Grow Up"	The ad advertises the Honda Odyssey mini-van and features the artwork of Keith Haring. Narrator Jack Lemmon tells the viewer that despite growing up, getting a job, getting married, and having kids doesn't mean that the viewer has to settle for a regular mini-van. It was the first of three ads which Honda aired back-to-back-to-back in the 4th quarter.
Car	Honda "Joys of a Mini-Van"	Jack Lemmon talks about some the "joys" of the mini-van, including the big sliding door, the heavy removable third row seat, and the rear windows that don't roll down. He then talks about the features that Honda Odyssey has which other mini-vans do not; such as having four doors and a fold away rear seat. As with the "Grow Up" spot, Keith Haring's artwork is featured. It was the last of the three ads which Honda aired back-to-back-to-back in the 4th quarter.
Car	Honda "Spy Chase"	The ad parodies the James Bond movies; a couple in a Honda del Sol is being chased by a helicopter. Right as the helicopter catches up to the del Sol, the villain in the ad jumps on top of the roof and begins attacking the car. The tuxedo-clad driver reacts to this, by releasing the detachable roof of the car with the villain on top of it. It was the second of three ads which Honda aired back-to-back-to-back in the 4th quarter.
Car	Isuzu "Paris-Dakar"	An Isuzu Trooper drives through a village in Morocco, in nod to the Paris-Dakar Rally
Car	Jeep "Driveaway"	
Car	Jeep "Snow Covered"	The ad was produced by Bozell. The commercial features something tunneling beneath the snow, crossing a vast and desolate mountain range, bathed in the multicolored glow of the setting sun. The tunneling object is never exposed and actually remains undefined until the last seconds of the ad, when we see twin taillights light up at a partially submerged stop sign and then turn left. The car is only identified as a Jeep on the final title card that flashes across the screen The commercial first aired during the opening ceremonies of the 1994 Winter Olympics. Although the ad was recognized for its remarkable special effects, many of which eschewed CGI in favor of practical setups, it has been most credited for its approach to the Jeep brand as a whole. While most ads only receive major airplay for a few months, "Snow Covered" was shown for most of a decade after its release. The Snow Covered ad was awarded with the prestigious Grand Prix award in the section Film Lions at the Cannes Lions International Advertising Festival in 1994, becoming the first auto ad to ever do so. It beat Cup Noodles sequels "Hungry?", Quetzalcoatlus, and Uintatherium which were produced by Hakuhodo. Before that, the ad aired during Super Bowl XXIX.
Car	Toyota "Clouds"	
Car rental	Thrifty "Prehistoric Times"	
Credit card	American Express "Lost At Sea"	
Clothing	Lee "Mannequin"	
Clothing	Lee "Support Group"	
Clothing	Lee "Vibrating Store"	
Clothing	Nike "Stanley's Speech"	Stanley Craver (Dennis Hopper) gives a speech about his love for football, parodying the opening of the 1970 film, Patton
Clothing	No Fear "Rodeo"	The commercial features nine-time world champion rodeo cowboy Ty Murray (It aired later during the 1995 Indianapolis 500).
Exercise equipment	Soloflex "Men"	
Exercise equipment	Soloflex "Women"	
Food	Doritos "Mario Cuomo and Ann Richards"	
Food	Doritos "Player Poet"	
Food	Lays "Scouts"	
Food	Pork "The Most Popular Meat in the World"	
Food	Rold Gold "Sparky"	
Financial services	The Principal Financial Group "Reason"	
Financial services	The Principal Financial Group "Topic"	
Luxury vehicles	BMW "Boring"	
Luxury vehicles	Lexus "Chase This"	
Luxury vehicles	Lincoln "Perfect Balance"	
Mail	FedEx "Just Warming"	
Multivitamin	Centrum "More"	
Motor oil	Quaker State "4x4"	
Personal care	Gillette "Microfins"	
Petroleum	Exxon "People Stopping By"	
Petroleum	Sunoco "The Blue Button-Down Shirt"	
Restaurant	Burger King "Car Salesman"	A used car salesman gives a hard sell pitch to the viewer for the Whopper Soundtrack: Spanish Flea by Herb Alpert & the Tijuana Brass
Restaurant	Taco Bell "Border Lights"	
Satellite television	PrimeStar "At Last"	A satellite in space projects a beam, formed by various TV and movie clips, into a satellite dish next to a house on earth
Security	Master Lock "Security"	
Shampoo	Denorex "Tingles"	
Soft drink	Pepsi "Bill Changer"	
Soft drink	Pepsi "Diner"	On a snowy, winter night, a Pepsi and Coke truck driver stop at a roadside diner. The two truck drivers begin bonding over things like family photos and stories. That leads the two to share their colas with each other; only for the Coke driver refusing to give his Pepsi back. The ad ends with a fight starting between the two truck drivers. Soundtrack: Get Together by The Youngbloods
Soft drink	Pepsi "Field of Dreams"	The ad is a spoof of the 1989 film Field of Dreams, an adult male is reunited with his deceased father, who was a baseball player. When the father asks for a Pepsi, the son responds by giving him a cheap, fictional, off-brand cola, named Fred's Choice. Despite saving nine cents on the cola he purchased, this disappoints the father and ends with him walking back into the cornfield he came out of.
Soft drink	Pepsi "Innertube"	A kid sucks himself into a Pepsi bottle
Sports Equipment	Wilson Sporting Goods "David & Goliath"	A cinematic-styled spot, based on the Bible, David & Goliath; David knocks out Goliath with his slingshot The ammunition in the slingshot happens to be a rock with the Wilson "W" emblem on it
Television network	HBO "Directing for HBO"	At a party, a man pretends to claim that he directed movies for HBO. The man is then asked questions about the various stars he has worked with. Each time he is asked about an actor he supposedly worked with; he tries to downplay it. That is until he crosses path with Dennis Hopper, asking if he knows who the man is and ends up blowing his cover.
Tire	Goodyear "Ski Jump"	
Tolnaftate	Tinactin "Control Room"	
Tolnaftate	Tinactin "Looker Room"	

== 1996 (XXX) ==
Product type	Product/title	Plot/notes
Beer	Budweiser "Winter"	The Budweiser Frogs' tongues are stuck to a can of Budweiser because of very cold weather
Beer	Budweiser "World Party"	The Bud One Airship flies around the world before arriving in Atlanta, in preparation for the upcoming Summer Olympics
Candy	Snickers "Marv Levy"	After losing four consecutive Super Bowls, coach Marv Levy of the Buffalo Bills tells his players that no one can leave the locker room they are in until they have a plan to finally win the Super Bowl. Worried about the length of the meeting and their hunger, the players all begin eating Snickers bars.
Car	Toyota "Wolves"	
Film	Independence Day	TV promo
Food	Wheaties "Time Out"	Appearing on Jumbotrons on each end of a football field, Deion Sanders and Steve Young banter a little over which brand of Wheaties is better. Michael Jordan also appears
Mail	Mail Boxes Etc. "Top Dog"	The driver of the Oscar Mayer Wienermobile, Chad Gretzema, talks about using Mail Boxes Etc.
Restaurant	McDonald's "Baby Swing"	In the ad, a little girl swings in her baby swing to "Rock-a-Bye Baby/" Swinging forward, she puts on a happy smile. Swinging backwards, her face crumples in distress. While swinging forward, her eyes light up again, swinging back, tears form in her eyes, A reverse cut shows that the swing is facing a window. When the swing goes forward the baby is able to see McDonald's golden arches. When it swings back she can not see them. The Baby Swing ad won the Grand Prix in the section Film Lions at the Cannes Lions International Advertising Festival with the Rolo ad "Elephant" also winning in the same year. The commercial was produced by Leo Burnett Worldwide.
Soft drink	Pepsi "Buddy Burger"	A man has difficulties trying to get his order through at a fast-food restaurant's muffled drive through intercom
Soft drink	Pepsi "Coyote and Roadrunner"	Wile E. Coyote meets Deion Sanders
Soft drink	Pepsi "Security Camera"	In the advertisement, a security camera catches a Coca-Cola truck driver attempting to grab a Pepsi out of a cooler; only to have all the cans spill out of the cooler and in front of the Coke driver. Hank Williams 1952 song, Your Cheatin' Heart, provides the soundtrack.

== 1997 (XXXI) ==
Product type	Product/title	Plot/notes
Car	Cadillac "Wizard"	In the ad, a princess (portrayed by Cindy Crawford) walks into a dark castle and approaches a cartoon duck named Ziggy. The two then drive off in a Cadillac Catera.
Car	Nissan "Pigeons"	In an homage to Top Gun, pigeons attempt to poop on a Nissan, but the car is too fast for them
Credit card	Visa "Bob Dole"	In the ad, Bob Dole returns to his hometown of Russell, Kansas west of Topeka, and uses a check to pay for an order at diner. Despite the notoriety, Dole is asked for some form of identification when paying with the check for his meal. It promotes the Visa Check Card.
Film	Dante's Peak	Movie promos
Film	Liar Liar	Movie promos
Film	Men in Black	Movie promos
Film	The Devil's Own	Movie promos
Film	The Fifth Element	Movie promos
Film	The Lost World: Jurassic Park	Movie promos
Film	The Saint	Movie promos
Film	Volcano	Movie promos
Food	Eggo "Grandma"	An Eggo waffle is shown popping out of a toaster. A family rushes over to grab it, but it disappears. In an instant replay, it is revealed their grandmother somersaulted through the air and finished eating it before they got to the toaster.
Food	Lays "Nuzzle and Nibble"	In the ad, Miss Piggy falls in love with a charming man at a fancy restaurant. But when the man wants to eat her Baked Lays potato chips, she karate chops him through the wall.
Food	Lays "Party"	People are shown celebrating the new flavors of Baked Lays. When Miss Piggy has the door closed on her, she disrupts the party by kicking down the door. Cast: Richard Lewis
Footwear	Fila "Stackhouse"	Jerry Stackhouse dunks a basketball on top of an unfinished skyscraper
Home care	Dirt Devil "Broom"	In a scene edited from the 1951 movie, Royal Wedding, Fred Astaire dances with a Dirt Devil Broom vac, all while sweeping up a pile of dirt on the ground.
Home care	Dirt Devil "Ceiling"	In another ad featuring a dance scene from Royal Wedding, Astaire uses the Dirt Devil Ultra hand vac, to clean the walls and ceilings of a room.
Home care	Dirt Devil "Stairs"	Taken from the 1948 movie, Easter Parade; Astaire cleans a set of stairs using the Dirt Devil Ultra MVP Vacuum
Hotel	Quality "Brett Favre"	Brett Favre pops out of a suitcase to answer some questions from a group of reporters
Soft drink	Pepsi "Darth Vader"	While watching Star Wars, a little kid is sucking on the straw of his Pepsi too loud, so Darth Vader uses the force to crush his Pepsi. An usher stands up for the kid, and soon has a giant lightsaber battle with Vader.
Telecommunications	MCI "Emoticons"	The meanings for several emoticons are explained in this advertisement
Telecommunications	MCI "Space Kids"	In the ad, children in a classroom communicate with an astronaut in space, via email and video from MCI. During the conversation, the inside of the classroom becomes weightless and the kids begin to float around like they are in space.

== 1998 (XXXII) ==
Product type	Product/title	Plot/notes
Beer	Bud Light "Chicken Pool"	A man challenges a pool player with his chicken; the chicken wins the game by shooting eggs
Beer	Bud Light "Shopping"	In the ad, a man is bored while his wife is clothes shopping. He hears a voice in one of the clothing racks, and finds four of his buddies watching the game. Cast: Sean Hayes, Kathy Christopherson
Beer	Budweiser "Master Plan"	In a six-part commercial story, Louie the Lizard tries to kill off the Budweiser Frogs. Here are the events: 1. Louie tells the frogs to enjoy the first half, because they may not be around for the second 2. Louie denies rumors from Frank that he is going to kill the Frogs 3. The Ferret, Louie's accomplice, drops the Budweiser sign into the swamp, electrocuting the frogs 4. Louie says it is the best day of his life, until he sees that the Frogs have survived 5. Louie rants to the Ferret that he screwed up the job 6. Louie apologizes for trying to kill the Frogs, saying it was purely for entertainment reasons
Car	Pontiac "ACME Pontiac"	In a Wile E. Coyote and Road Runner cartoon, Wile E. Coyote uses a Widetrack Grand Prix to try and catch the Road Runner. Coyote is almost successful, until the cartoon ends before he can catch the Road Runner.
Car	Volvo Trucks "Road Sage"	A truck driver named Gus shares his words of advice on trucking
Computer	Intel "Mystery"	In the advertisement, everyone wears radiation suits in the Intel lab. A detective (in a suit) finds a processor is missing. It is either Jimmy the Wire or Susie the Mouse. People voted in the internet poll "Whodunit?". During the 4th quarter, the suspect was announced.
Credit card	Visa "Elephant"	In the ad, a little girl talks about how she would want a pet elephant. Backed by sweet music, the girl talks about her adventures with the elephant. She instead gets a plush elephant with Visa Debit. The commercial ends with her dreaming of a pet zebra.
Film	A Bugs life	Movie promos
Film	Antz	Movie promos
Film	Armageddon	Movie promos
Film	Blade	Movie promos
Film	Godzilla	Movie promos
Film	Lost in Space	Movie promos
Film	Mercury Rising	Movie promos
Film	Mulan	Movie promos
Film	The Prince of Egypt	Movie promos
Film	Sphere	Movie promos
Film	The Mask of Zorro	Movie promos
Film	The Wedding Singer	Movie promos
Food	Doritos "Laundromat"	In the ad, two men are at a laundromat when a beautiful woman (Ali Landry) enters to do her own laundry and notices them eating Doritos. They try impressing her with elaborate ways of tossing Doritos 3Ds into the air. Intrigued, the woman then walks over to them, takes the 3Ds and tosses them into a washing machine where it shoots out individual pieces and demonstrates her own unique way of eating the new Doritos. The man on the left then says, "Ay chihuahua!" Also starring Sean Hayes
Food	Hormel "Bold Innovations"	What appears to be a commercial for a car turns out to be a commercial for Hormel Chili
Food	Tabasco Sauce "Mosquito"	In the ad, a man is constantly putting Tabasco sauce on his pizza. When a mosquito bites him on the leg, he does not mind. The mosquito flies off and explodes. The advert aired as a cinema ad in the UK in late March/early April 2008.
Mail	FedEx "We Apologize"	A colored "Please Stand By" test bar is shown on the screen. A message scrolls across the screen: "We apologize. You should be watching the new ad from EarthCo Insurance. It starred those lifeguards from Baywatch and a chorus line of singing kangaroos. We even got Garth Brooks to do the music. It was very humorous. Unfortunately, a tape of the commercial didn't get to NBC on time. Imagine, $1.3 million is going down the tubes all because some boob at our ad agency didn't send the commercial with FedEx. (Had they used FedEx, they would still be our ad agency.)"
Restaurant	Pizza Hut "Elvis"	Five guys are shown hanging out. One says that Elvis is back, while one jokes that he's dancing over at Pizza Hut. We cut to Pizza Hut to find the rumor is true, as he's come back from the dead for their new Edge Pizza.
Satellite television	PrimeStar "Runaway Pipe"	A man protects his satellite dish from getting hit by a massive pipe, by driving his classic Mustang into the rolling pipe.
Shoes	Hilfiger "Have Some Fun"	In the ad, a top woman agent is representing Michael Richards as the Hilfiger spokesman. We see Richards losing at basketball when he hits his head.
Soft drink	Pepsi "Cup Holder"	Jeff Gordon tries to retrieve a can Pepsi in his car while competing in a NASCAR race Also Starring: Ray Evernham
Soft drink	Pepsi "Mosquito"	A CGI fly is shown sucking on a drop of Pepsi. He then grows lips and a mouth, and proceeds to sing The Rolling Stone's "Brown Sugar", but is later crushed by a Pepsi can. One version has a red-headed teenage boy, while a different version was released with a young Ricky Martin.
Soft drink	Pepsi "Goose"	A man does aerial tricks with a goose, and they share a Pepsi afterward
Sports	NFL "Anthony"	A kid named Anthony is said to play in the NFL
Tire	Michelin "Drill"	A man is shown going to his car and he drills a hole in one of the tires. Since it is a Michelin tire, it still will not go flat.
Website	Autobytel "Pajamas"	While buying amazing car deals online, a woman is sucked into her computer to retrieve her new car

== 1999 (XXXIII) ==
Product type	Product/title	Plot/notes
Beer	Bud Light "Mouse"	In the advertisement, a man sees a woman with Bud Light in her apartment. He shoots a mouse with a slingshot in her room causing her to freak out and go to the man's house to stay for the night.
Beer	Bud Light "Paper or Plastic"	Two guys are shown trying to pay for their items, but they do not have enough money. They get rid of some items, and are left with toilet paper and a six-pack of Bud Light, but they still don't have enough money for both. Forced to choose between the two, they choose Bud Light, and paper bags with which to bag their purchase.
Beer	Budweiser "Dalmatians"	In the ad, two Dalmatian puppies roll around in a basket at a firehouse. The puppy with the blue collar is picked as the fire dog, in which it sticks its tongue at his brother with a red collar. Two years pass, and the red-collared puppy is seen by the fire dog to be in a Budweiser chariot driven by Clydesdales. The dalmatian then sticks his tongue out at his estranged brother.
Beer	Budweiser "Lashing"	Louie the Lizard is shown apologizing for last year's commercial (see 1998). When the Budweiser Frogs (mainly "Bud" and "Er") turn out to be able to talk, "Bud" and "Er" slap Louie with their tongues.
Beer	Budweiser "Lobster"	A lobster about to be cooked in a restaurant is shown. He grabs a Budweiser and holds it hostage. Freaking out the restaurant, it leaves with the Budweiser. An onlooking diner tells his waitress that he will have steak instead.
Car	Cadillac "Bad To The Bone"	A Cadillac Escalade is assembled in a factory, while Bad To The Bone from George Thorogood plays
Car	Volvo Trucks "Arm Pump"	In the ad, citizens of a town salute a truck driver by doing the arm pump. The driver responds each time by honking his horn.
Credit card	American Express "Real Life"	Jerry Seinfeld is shown leaving his show to get a real life, and proceeds to go on a cross-country road trip with his American Express card. He ends up in New York as he proclaims, "This is where I belong!" before it is revealed to be filmed on set as a commercial.
Credit card	MasterCard "Toons"	Characters from the Hanna-Barbera cartoons are shown what it costs for contact lenses, a treadmill, a Wonderbra, and a face lift. Being happy with yourself is said to be priceless.
Computer	Apple Inc. "HAL"	In a parody of 2001: A Space Odyssey, HAL flirts with Dave. He says that a bug caused computers to misbehave in the year 2000, since they could not recognize the year 2000. They say that Macintosh can recognize the year, and then asks, "You like your Macintosh better than me. Don't you, Dave?"
Film	8MM	Two movie promos
Film	Austin Powers: The Spy Who Shagged Me	A movie promo announces that the new film to see this summer is the new Star Wars film. The second is the next Austin Powers film called The Spy Who Shagged Me.
Film	The Corruptor	Movie promo
Film	Ed TV Life	Joint movie promos
Film	The Iron Giant	Movie promo
Film	The Matrix	Movie promo
Film	Mulan "Groundhog Day"	Advertising the release of the film on video on Groundhog Day, Mushu rises out of the hole instead of a groundhog, but he is hit by a football.
Film	The Mummy	Movie promos
Film	October Sky	Movie promos
Film	Star Wars: Episode I – The Phantom Menace	Movie promos
Film	Stuart little	Movie promos
Film	Tarzan	Movie promos
Film	Toy story 2	Movie promos
Film	True Crime	Movie promos
Film	Wild Wild West	Movie promos
Food	Cracker Jack "Really Big Bag"	In addition to snack-size and family-size bags of Cracker Jack, a really, really big bag is also being tested, with one of the prizes being a real-life pony
Food	Doritos "Smokin"	At a college classroom, students are shown in awe of their hot teacher. She eats Smoking Red Barbequed Doritos, which causes the sprinklers to go off. Luckily, the students bring umbrellas. But when they forget to use their umbrellas the second time she eats Doritos, the students bow down to her in the rain. The announcer then says, "Umbrellas not included". Cast: Ali Landry
Insurance	Progressive "E.T."	Directly after the end of the 1982 film, E.T. the Extra-Terrestrial, E.T. explains to their parent's what earthlings were like. The alien mentions to them that they still rely on the wheel for things like bicycles and cars; along with the fact that the humans operating those wheeled items can get involved in accidents. When explaining this, E.T.'s parents get worried, but E.T. then gives the two hope by telling them that Progressive Insurance exists and can help when humans get involved in such accidents. While explaining all of this, the alien's ship narrowly avoids hitting a spaceship headed towards Earth, piloted by former astronauts Buzz Aldrin and Jim Lovell. The ad ends with E.T. telling the parents the best way to contact Progressive is by "phone".
Mail	FedEx "Stanley Cup"	In the ad, an agent is supposed to deliver the Stanley Cup on the hockey rink in a crate. The package instead is bird seed. In Bolivia, villagers receive a crate with the Stanley Cup, and use it as a cup for grapes.
Professional wrestling	WWF "WWF Attitude"	Walking through the World Wrestling Federation's headquarters, several performers (including Mankind, Sable, "Stone Cold" Steve Austin, and The Undertaker) are shown talking about the company offering non-violent entertainment which does not rely on sex appeal, as scenes directly contradicting their statements play out in the background.
Restaurant	Pizza Hut "New Yorker"	Four different commercials are used to describe the new New Yorker pizza, two ads saying that New Yorkers have big mouths because of the big pizza: 1. Fran Drescher says how everything's big in New York 2. Spike Lee constantly complains about things in New York; 3. An announcer says that the pizza is so big that it has three zip codes 4. Donald Trump says that he has large things in New York, including his plans for the tallest skyscraper in New York and his name plastered all over the city
Shoes	Just For Feet "Kenyan Runner"	In the advertisement, a Kenyan man gets chased down and knocked over by four white men who chase after him with a Humvee, and secretly give him a sedative through the water he is splashed with to cool down. As the runner gets up he finds he is wearing the brand's shoes and screams in agony. The ad was extremely controversial and largely considered racist, and cited as a large reason that the company went bankrupt by 2004.
Soft drink	Pepsi One "Bad Boys"	Directed by Joe Pytka Cast: Cuba Gooding Jr.
Technology	Philips "Garage Movie Date"	A young woman is shown going on a date to the movies. Her date drives her across the street in front of his driveway as they watch Austin Powers: International Man of Mystery with Philips equipment set up in the garage.
Website	Buy.com "Aliens"	After aliens from another planet are shown to be able to get Buy.com on their computer. They enjoy many things including the DVD edition of Caddyshack, a PlayStation with Namco's Tekken 3, and Men Are From Mars, Women Are From Venus.
Website	HotJobs.com	In the ad, a security nightwatchman at an unknown place is bored. He goes into Hotjobs.com until landing the perfect job: a security nightwatchman in a bigger building.
Website	Monster.com "When I Grow Up"	Children are shown saying what they want to do when they grow up, including filing papers every day, being a yes man, and having a brown nose.
