= NerdWallet =

American personal finance company

NerdWallet, Inc.
- Company type: Public
- Traded as: Nasdaq: NRDS (Class A)
- Founded: August 2009; 17 years ago
- Headquarters: San Francisco, California, U.S.
- Creators: Tim Chen; Jacob Gibson
- Key people: Tim Chen (CEO)
- Industry: Personal finance, fintech
- Revenue: ▲US$836.6 million (2025)
- Operating income: ▲US$65.2 million (2025)
- Net income: ▲US$48.7 million (2025)
- Total assets: ▲US$461.1 million (2025)
- Total equity: ▲US$374.5 million (2025)
- Employees: 650 (2025)
- Website: nerdwallet.com

NerdWallet is an American personal finance company, founded in 2009 by Tim Chen and Jacob Gibson. It has a website and app that earns money by promoting financial products to its users.

== History ==
NerdWallet was founded in August 2009 by Tim Chen and Jacob Gibson, with an initial capital investment of $800. Its first product was a web application that provided comparative information about credit cards. Subsequently, it generated large quantities of content to help boost its search engine results. Website traffic grew quickly in 2010 and, by March 2014, the website had up to 30 million users. The following year, it raised $64 million in its first round of funding, at an estimated valuation of $500 million.

In 2016, the company acquired the retirement planning firm AboutLife, and was valued at $520 million.

In August 2020, the company expanded its footprint into the UK by acquiring Know Your Money, a Norwich-based startup that provides a similar range of comparison and information tools geared at people who live in the UK In November 2020, NerdWallet acquired small business loan marketplace, Fundera.

In November 2021, the company went public on the Nasdaq stock exchange.

In July 2022, NerdWallet acquired On the Barrelhead, a consumer debt robo-advisor platform, for $120 million. In May 2023, Yahoo! Finance reported that NerdWallet's platform had an average of 23 million monthly users.

In October 2024, NerdWallet bought the brokerage firm Next Door Lending. In June 2025, NerdWallet expanded its wealth management services through its acquisition of Future You Wealth.

== Administration ==
Tim Chen is the CEO and co-founder of NerdWallet. Following the dismissal of 11 employees in December 2013, NerdWallet reorganized its leadership structure. By 2015, NerdWallet had 200 employees. In April 2017, the company underwent further reorganization, laying off over 40 employees, including its VP of growth. As of January 2026, the company had 650 employees.

== Products and services ==
NerdWallet provides comparison tools for financial products such as credit cards, checking accounts, and mortgages. It also receives affiliate fees from banks and insurance companies for successful sign ups. The company also generates revenue through referral fees for matching users with financial products and services.

== See also ==
- AwardWallet
- Bankrate
- CreditKarma
- Intuit Mint
- LendingTree
- Money (financial website)
- WalletHub
