= List of 1960s Super Bowl commercials =

This is a list of Super Bowl commercials that played during the 1960s, starting with the first Super Bowl in 1967. This article does not list advertisements for a local region or station (e.g. promoting local news shows), pre-kickoff and post-game commercials/sponsors, or in-game advertising sponsors and television bumpers.

== 1967 (I) ==
The commercials included ads from "Ford, Chrysler, RCA, RJ Reynolds Tobacco, McDonald's, and Budweiser among others."

== 1968 (II) ==
One notable commercial featured was a Gulf advertisement.

== 1969 (III) ==
| Product type | Product/title | Plot/notes |
|---|---|---|
| Airlines | TWA "Old West" | A contemporary TWA airliner lands in a wild west town. |
| Airlines | TWA "Tour Our Tours" | Promotes the airliner's flights to Europe. Features footage of several European cities and landmarks. |
| Beer | Schlitz "Comin' Atcha" | A man asks for a Schlitz beer at a bar. The bartender fills up the customer's glass and slides it down the counter. While this is going on, another bartender talks about the quality of Schlitz. Just as the bartender who has been on the floor is about to lift up the bar flap, to go behind the counter, the customer quickly reacts, and the bar flap is lowered just in time for him to receive their glass of beer. |
| Car | Chrysler "Scuba Diver" | A scuba diver in a dreamy sequence with groovy music introduces Chrysler as "the Possible Dream." |
| Car | Plymouth "Road Runner" | Wile E. Coyote chases the Road Runner into a Plymouth car dealership. |
| Cigarette | Pall Mall "Gold" | When having to choose between two sets of cigarettes, a guy (who is represented by a close up his hand) has to choose between one set that has 'Good, Rich Flavor' and the other set that is 'Lower in Tar'. Before selecting one of the two, another hand comes in stops the guy from making a choice and is presented a pack of Pall Mall Gold cigarettes. The hand that presented the Pall Mall cigarettes informs the guy that both choices can be found in their cigarettes. |
| Cigarette | Silva Thins "Lower Tar" | A man wearing sunglasses, smokes a Silva Thins cigarette while a voiceover talks about how the cigarette has the lowest amount of tar, according to US Government studies. |
| Cigarette | Salem "Country" | The ad begins with a couple driving a Ford Mustang in a big city. The driver of the car then grabs a Salem cigarette. Right as he begins smoking the cigarette, the ad stops for a quick second. When the ad starts again, the two are now cruising offroad through a sunny countryside in a Jeep. |
| Cigarette | Winston "Playing Your Song" | A man turns a carton of Winston cigarettes into a record and places it on a record player. While spinning on the turntable, the makeshift record ends up playing the Winston tastes good like a cigarette should jingle. |
| Electronics | RCA "Non-Smear Color #1" | To demonstrate the effectiveness of the Non-Smear color television from RCA, a screen is split in half. The test is performed by an adult woman. On the left side shows an unclear, grainy screen. Thanks to the transistors and automatic fine tuning installed in the RCA televisions, the distorted effects are not present on the right side of the screen. |
| Electronics | RCA "Non-Smear Color #2" | Identical to the first advertisement but with a younger woman conducting the test |
| Juice | Mott's "Clamato" | To make Clamato, clams and tomatoes are crossed into one single hybrid-organism. |
| Personal care | Gillette "Adjustable" | An animated, anthropomorphic Gillette Techmatic razor has the pitch of his voice lowered, each time the dial on him is adjusted from "Hi" to "Lo". |
| Personal care | Gillette "Hands Down" | A giant blob of Gillette Foamy shaving cream sticks to a man's hand, free of any drip. |
| Personal care | Gillette "Swedish Lady Barber" | A man from the United States travels to Sweden to get a shave, only to stop the session several times; due to the razor from the barber not being as good as the Gillette Spoiler razor he uses back home in the US. |
| Personal care | Right Guard "The Great American Coverup" | People attempt to hide their underarm perspiration, while out in about in their daily lives. |
| Petroleum | Phillips 66 "Anti-Pollution" | In response to air pollution, the detergent additives in Phillips 66 gasoline and Motor oil allows people to confidently take a deep breath. |
| Petroleum | Phillips 66 "Kids Gas Stand" | While peddling his Ford Mustang pedal car, a little boy pulls up and is serviced at Phillips 66 gas stand that two kids have made, similar to that of a lemonade stand. |
| Tire | Goodyear "Polyglas Testimonial - John" | John P. Cearley of Texas voices his approval of the WideTread Polyglas tires from Goodyear that are on his car. |
| Tire | Goodyear "Polyglas Testimonial - Thomas" | Thomas B. Burness, a club manager, gives his thoughts on Goodyear's WideTread Polyglas tires. |
