= Black Star Beer =

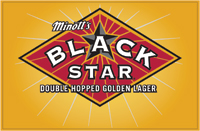
- Type: American Pilsner
- Origin: Whitefish, Montana, USA
- Introduced: 1995, 2010
- Discontinued: 2002-2009
- Alcohol by volume: 4.5%
- Website: www.blackstarbeer.com

Black Star Beer is a double hopped golden lager made with two-row malting barley and a combination of Mittelfruh and Czech Saaz hops. The Great Northern Brewing Company located in Whitefish, Montana was the original producer of Black Star Beer.

== Beer ==
Black Star Double Hopped Golden Lager is an American "double hopped" (dry hopped) golden lager based on traditional European Pilsners. It is made with two-row malted barley. The beer contains 4.5% ABV (alcohol by volume), and has 13 to 15 IBUs (International Bittering Units). Brewed with two different hops, Black Star contains 20% Bavarian Mittelfruh and 80% Czech Saaz hops.

== History ==
In 1987, Joseph Minott Wessinger started the McKenzie River Corporation, a San Francisco beverage marketing company. In 1995, Joseph Minott Wessinger built the Great Northern Brewing Company in Whitefish, Montana and began brewing Black Star beer.

Joseph Minott Wessinger is a great-great-grandson of Henry Weinhard. His father Fred Wessinger worked at the Blitz-Weinhard Brewery in Portland, Oregon.

Other products introduced by the McKenzie River Corporation include:

- St. Ides Premium Malt Liquor
- Sparks
- Steel Reserve High Gravity Lager
- Howling Monkey Energizing Elixir
- Le Tourment Vert Absinthe Francaise

== Great Northern Brewing ==
The Great Northern Brewing Company was designed by Joe Esherick and built in a traditional gravity flow arrangement. The mostly automated brew house is one of the most complex for its size in the country. The fermenting and packaging area, known as the Cellar is open and roomy, allowing for many brewery operations to occur simultaneously.

After 7 years (2002?) of brewing Black Star, Wessinger decided to stop brewing in order to pursue other projects. Wessinger and Great Northern Brewing Company (GNBC) started production again in January 2010 and Black Star was officially reintroduced on February 6, 2010. Black Star is being brewed at the same facility in which it was originally brewed in 1995.

In addition to Black Star, the Great Northern Brewing Company produces other lagers, ales and seasonal brews.

== Advertising campaigns ==
Black Star was introduced to a Pacific Northwest test market in the early nineties, which was supported by an acclaimed advertising campaign by Wieden & Kennedy. The campaign depicted a make-believe history of Black Star Beer through a series of six commercials hosted by John Corbett. The commercials were released in 1992 and received “Best of Show” honors in Advertising Age’s Best Awards competition. Wieden & Kennedy’s Black Star campaign also won the Cannes Lions 1993 Film Bronze award.

In 1994, Hal Riney & Partners developed a Ken Burns style advertising campaign that chronicled the history of Black Star Beer from the building of the brewery in Whitefish, Montana to its projected future success. Hal Riney personally spearheaded the TV, print and radio campaign for Black Star Beer. The campaign highlighted the natural beauty of Montana and the unique personalities of the Flathead Valley.

== Awards ==
- Silver Medal, 1999 North American Beer Awards
- Gold Medal, Best of the West 1997, North American Beer Awards
- Bronze Medal, Excellence in Brewing 2000 North American Beer Awards
- Consumer Product Award 2000, Award of Excellence by the American Tasting Institute
