= Ban on caffeinated alcoholic drinks in the United States =

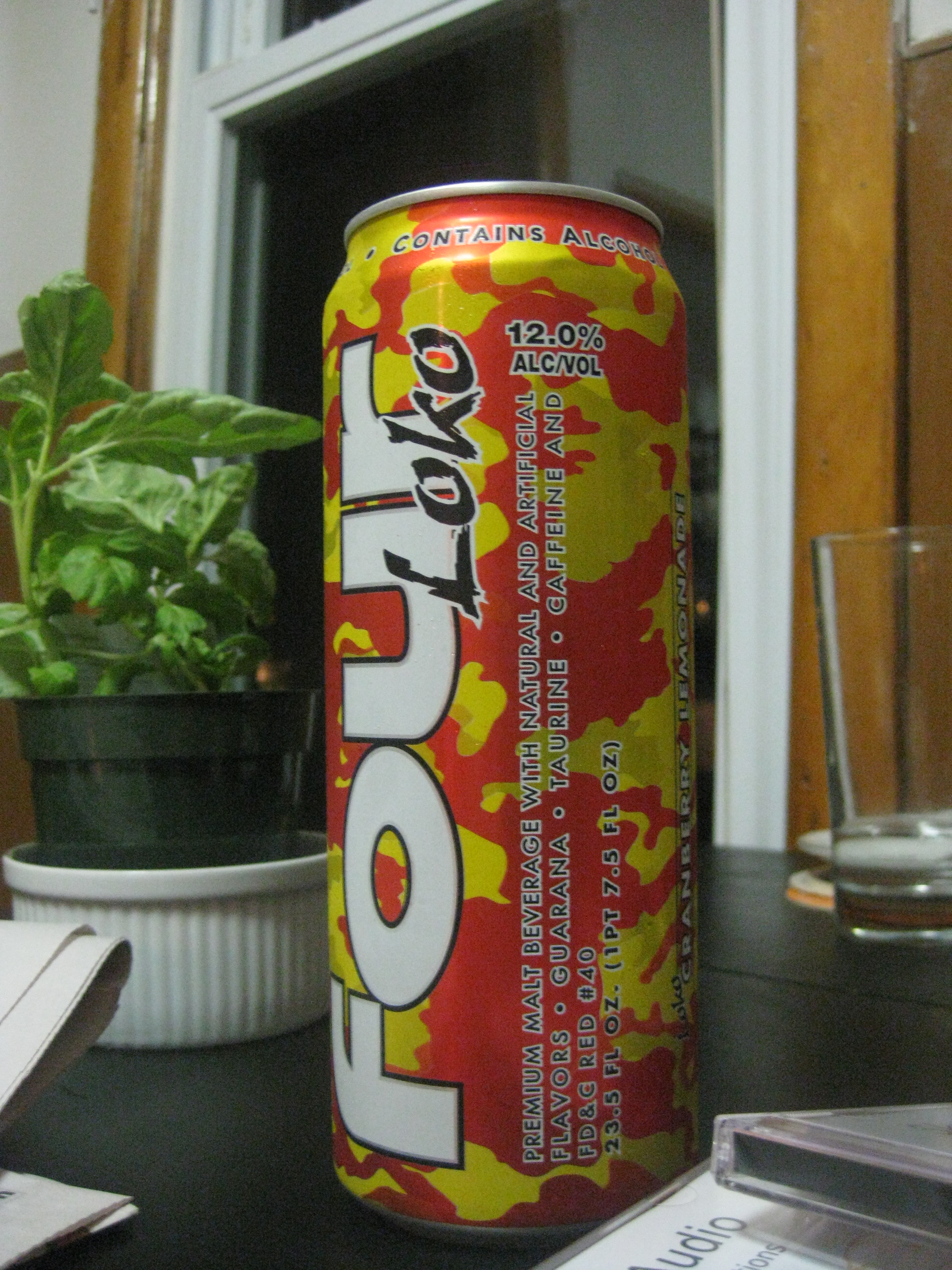
Four Loko beverage, a common caffeinated alcoholic beverage

On November 17, 2010, the United States FDA told seven manufacturers to stop production of caffeinated alcoholic drinks with added caffeine, which is deemed not generally recognized as safe as an additive. The ban does not apply to naturally caffeinated drinks such as coffee or tea being added to alcohol as in Irish coffee or hard iced tea respectively.

Such a ban was discussed as a result of multiple cases of alcohol poisoning and alcohol-related blackouts among users of such drinks. The majority of these alcohol poisoning cases were found on college campuses throughout the United States. Caffeinated alcoholic drinks such as Four Loko, Joose, Sparks and Tilt were the most popular around the U.S. The beverages, which combine malt liquor or other grain alcohol with caffeine and juices at alcohol concentrations up to about 14 percent, had become popular among younger generations. Their consumption had been associated with increased risk of serious injury, drunken driving, sexual assault and other detrimental behavior.

== Active ingredients ==
One of the more popular drinks, Four Loko, originally mixed an amount of caffeine equal to three cups of coffee with alcohol equivalent to about three cans of beer. Critics argue that the beverages are designed to appeal to younger buyers that are used to drinking caffeinated energy drinks. A 23.5-U.S.-fluid-ounce (690 ml) can of Four Loko contains either 6 or 12 percent alcohol by volume, depending on state regulations. Another reason for drinks such as Four Loko's appeal to youth is the pricing. At approximately $2 a can, it has been reported that college students or younger high school students would be more inclined to buy such beverages. When the ban was placed at the end of 2010, many students bought out what was left on shelves for resale.

== Proposed reason for ban ==
The U.S. Centers for Disease Control and Prevention estimates that the beverages are regularly consumed by 31 percent of 12- to 17-year-olds and 34 percent of 18- to 24-year-olds. After this was released there was a parental outcry from the majority of the country to ban the beverage. Drinkers who consume alcohol-laced energy drinks are about twice as likely as drinkers who do not report mixing alcohol with energy drinks to report being taken advantage of sexually, to report taking advantage of someone else sexually, and to report riding with a driver who was under the influence of alcohol, according to the CDC. Research has also noted that the extreme levels of alcohol and caffeine in the large serving beverages creates a "wide-awake drunk" that makes it impossible for people to comprehend how intoxicated they actually are and allows them to consume far more alcohol than they otherwise would be able to without passing out from intoxication.

As of November 10, 2010, caffeinated alcoholic energy drinks had been banned in Washington and Michigan in the United States. The bans followed a widely publicized incident which resulted in hospitalization in the fall of 2010 of college students who had consumed several cans of Four Loko caffeinated alcoholic beverage. Utah, which has state controlled liquor retail outlets, after studying them, never permitted the sale of caffeinated alcoholic energy drinks. The products are no longer legally delivered to Oklahoma after December 3, 2010, and delivery to retailers has been suspended in New York.

On November 17, 2010, the US Food and Drug Administration warned four companies, Charge Beverages Corp., New Century Brewing Co., Phusion Projects, and United Brands Company Inc, that the caffeine added to their malt alcoholic beverages is an "unsafe food additive" (not GRAS) and said that further action, including seizure of their products, may occur under federal law. In a press release, the FDA states "there is evidence that the combinations of caffeine and alcohol in these products pose a public health concern." They also state that concerns have been raised that caffeine can mask some of the sensory cues individuals might normally rely on to determine their level of intoxication. Warning letters were issued to each of the four companies requiring them to provide to the FDA in writing within 15 days of the specific steps the firms will be taking.

Manufacturers have argued that drinking a caffeinated alcoholic energy drink is indistinguishable from drinking a couple of glasses of wine followed by a couple of cups of coffee.

== Adverse effects ==
Caffeine has not been shown to have an effect on a person's self-assessment of their level of alcohol intoxication.

== Food and Drug Administration ==
In November 2009, the U.S. Food and Drug Administration notified nearly 30 manufacturers of caffeinated alcoholic beverages that it would study the safety and legality of their products.

In November 2010, the agency told the manufacturers of seven such beverages, including Four Loko, that their drinks are a "public health concern" and can not stay on the market in their current form. A member of the FDA said that the agency did not support the claim that the addition of caffeine to these alcoholic beverages is GRAS ("generally recognized as safe"), a regulatory standard.

The agency clarified that beverages that naturally contain caffeine due to their ingredients, such as coffee-based liqueurs, are not limited by these restrictions; the ruling only applies to beverages that have specifically added caffeine.

== Removing caffeine ==
The decision to remove caffeine from the beverage came from a review by the FDA, which gave the companies a window to either remove the caffeine and other stimulants in the drinks or face possible penalties under federal law. Experts have said the caffeine used in the beverages can mask the effects of alcohol, leaving drinkers unaware of how intoxicated they are. One of the companies that received letters of warning was Phusion Projects in Chicago which makes Four Loko. Phusion Projects announced in November 2010 that it was dropping caffeine and two other ingredients, guarana and taurine, from Four Loko.

== Buying binge ==
In the last quarter of 2010, around Washington D.C. there were record sales on the beverage Four Loko. Multiple liquor stores in the D.C. area near American and Georgetown universities claimed that there was an increase in sales of caffeinated alcoholic beverages before they were moved from the shelves. Grocery stores near the George Washington University campus also reported a large sales increase.

== See also ==
- Alcoholic drink
- Caffeinated drink
- Irish coffee
