= McKenzie River Corporation =

- Industry: Beverages
- Founded: 1987
- Headquarters: San Francisco, CA, USA
- Owner: Joseph Wessinger

McKenzie River Corporation is a beverage marketing firm based in San Francisco, CA. Founded in 1987 by Joseph Minott Wessinger with the help of his father, Fred Wessinger, the McKenzie River Corporation has launched a number of successful beverage products to the US market.

== History ==
Joseph Minott Wessinger began the McKenzie River Corporation (named for the McKenzie River in central Oregon), previously known as McKenzie River Partners, to follow in the footsteps of his great-great-grandfather, Henry Weinhard, the Pacific Northwest brewing pioneer. Wessinger is a part of a family tradition of brewing which began in 1856.

In 1991, the corporation was sued by the Attorney General of New York over advertisements allegedly directed at underage minority children. The suit was settled out of court. It was also fined and temporarily shut down by the Bureau of Alcohol, Tobacco and Firearms.

== Products ==
- St. Ides Premium Malt Liquor – St. Ides is a malt liquor that was introduced to the US market in 1987. It contains 8.2% ABV (alcohol by volume). The St. Ides brand is now owned by Pabst Brewing Company.
- Black Star Double Hopped Golden Lager – After building the Great Northern Brewing Company in Whitefish, Montana in 1994, Black Star Beer was launched in early 1995.
- Sparks – Sparks was one of the first alcoholic energy drinks to enter the US beverage market, launching in early 2001.
- Steel Reserve High Gravity Lager – Steel Reserve was introduced in early 2000 and was the first "High Gravity" lager.
- Howling Monkey Energizing Elixir – Howling Monkey is a caffeinated energy drink that was introduced 2007.
- Le Tourment Vert Absinthe Francaise – McKenzie River Corporation began importing Le Tourment Vert to the United States from Distillerie Vinet Ege, near Cognac city, France in early 2008.
- "Air", a first Sparkling Alcohol Water, was launched the summer of 2012. Air has 4% alcohol by volume and is available in a number of flavors.

== Miller purchase ==
On August 14, 2006, Miller Brewing announced it had completed the purchase of Sparks and Steel Reserve brands from McKenzie River Corp. for $215 million. Miller had been producing both products prior to this purchase.

== McKenzie Labs ==
In 2018, the company started the subsidiary Mckenzie Labs to develop Hive Extra Strength, all-natural, broad spectrum CBD. www.HiveCBD.com

== MacKenzie Communications ==
Joseph Minott Wessinger is also associated with MacKenzie Communications, a marketing company.
