= Mickeys =

Mickeys can mean:

- Mickey's, a malt liquor from the Miller Brewing Company
- The unit of measurement for how far a mouse has moved since it was last polled.
