= Stephen G. Skidmore =

American businessman and politician

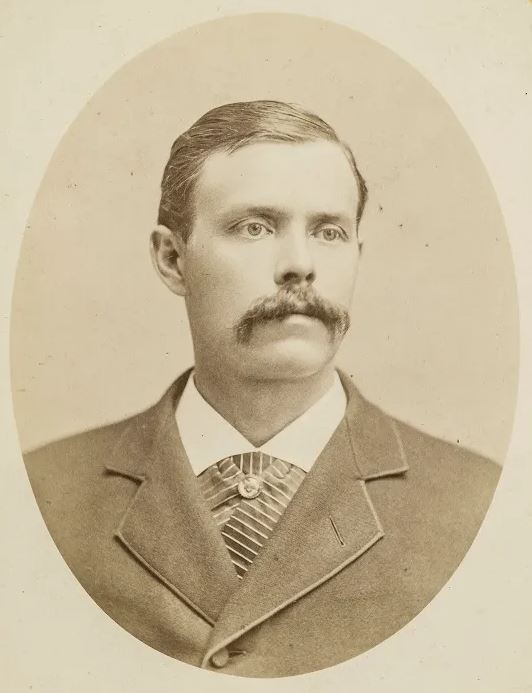

Member of the Portland City Council
- In office 1875–1878
- Preceded by: E. F. Russell
- Succeeded by: E. H. Stolte

Personal details
- Born: December 28, 1838 Peoria County, Illinois, United States
- Died: June 18, 1883 (aged 44) San Rafael, California, United States

Stephen Griggs Skidmore (1838-1883) was an American businessman and politician. He served on the Portland City Council from 1875 to 1878.

His will left funds for the creation of the Skidmore Fountain, which was named in his memory.

== Early life ==
Stephen Griggs Skidmore (middle name Gregg, according to some records) was born on December 28, 1838, in Peoria County, Illinois, to Andrew Reed Skidmore and Sarah Ann Slater. He was the second of six children. In 1850, his family moved from Illinois to Portland, Oregon.

== Career ==
Soon after arriving in Portland, at the age of 12, he began working as a paperboy for The Oregonian, which was recently established at the time. He soon after began working for the druggists Smith & Davis. In 1867, he founded his own pharmacy. Charles Sitton was his business partner.

Skidmore earned a fortune of around $150,000 (about $4.5 million today).

From 1875 to 1878, he served on the Portland City Council, and was a long-time volunteer firefighter. In 1878, at the request of Governor Stephen F. Chadwick, Skidmore represented Oregon at the Paris World's Fair.

== Later life and death ==
Beginning in 1882, Skidmore began suffering from an unspecified lung problem. He began to travel extensively for the last year of his life before dying on June 18, 1883, while in San Rafael, California. His body was returned to Portland and he was buried at River View Cemetery.

== Legacy ==
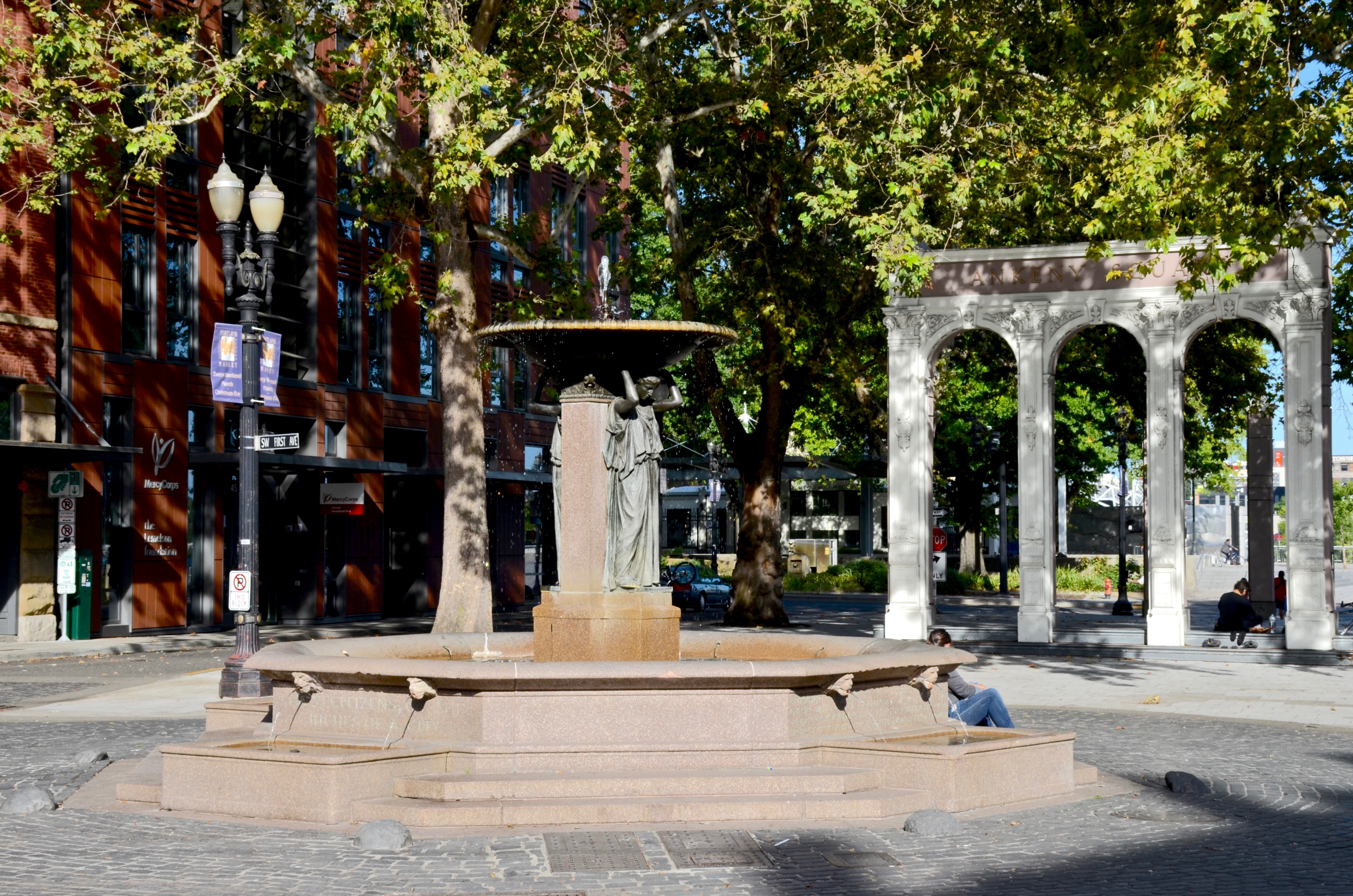
Skidmore Fountain

Skidmore Street in North and Northeast Portland are named for Skidmore, as are The Skidmore Apartments in the Overlook neighborhood.

=== Skidmore Fountain ===
In his will, Skidmore left $5,000 to the city. $18,000 were also donated by Skidmore's friends Henry Failing and C. E. S. Wood, as well as his business partner Charles Sitton. The city used these funds to build the Skidmore Fountain. It was sculpted by Olin Levi Warner and has water at different levels, originally for "people, dogs, and horses" to drink out of.

Portland brewer Henry Weinhard offered to pump beer through the fountain for its dedication, but the city declined the offer.

Skidmore Fountain station is a disused MAX Light Rail station located next to and named for the fountain.
