= Grand Valley Brewing Company =

Brewing company

Clix Malt Liquor
- Manufacturer: Grand Valley Brewing Company
- Introduced: 1939
- Style: Malt liquor

The Grand Valley Brewing Company was founded in 1937 in Ionia, Michigan. It created the first malt liquor brewed in the United States.

Brewery owner 'Click' Koerber was the creator of the process and owner of the patent that details the production of Clix malt liquor.

In addition to Clix Malt Liquor, the Grand Valley Brewing Company created a stout beer using the same process.
