= Henry's Tavern =

American bar and restaurant chain

Coordinates: 45.58918°N 122.59347°W

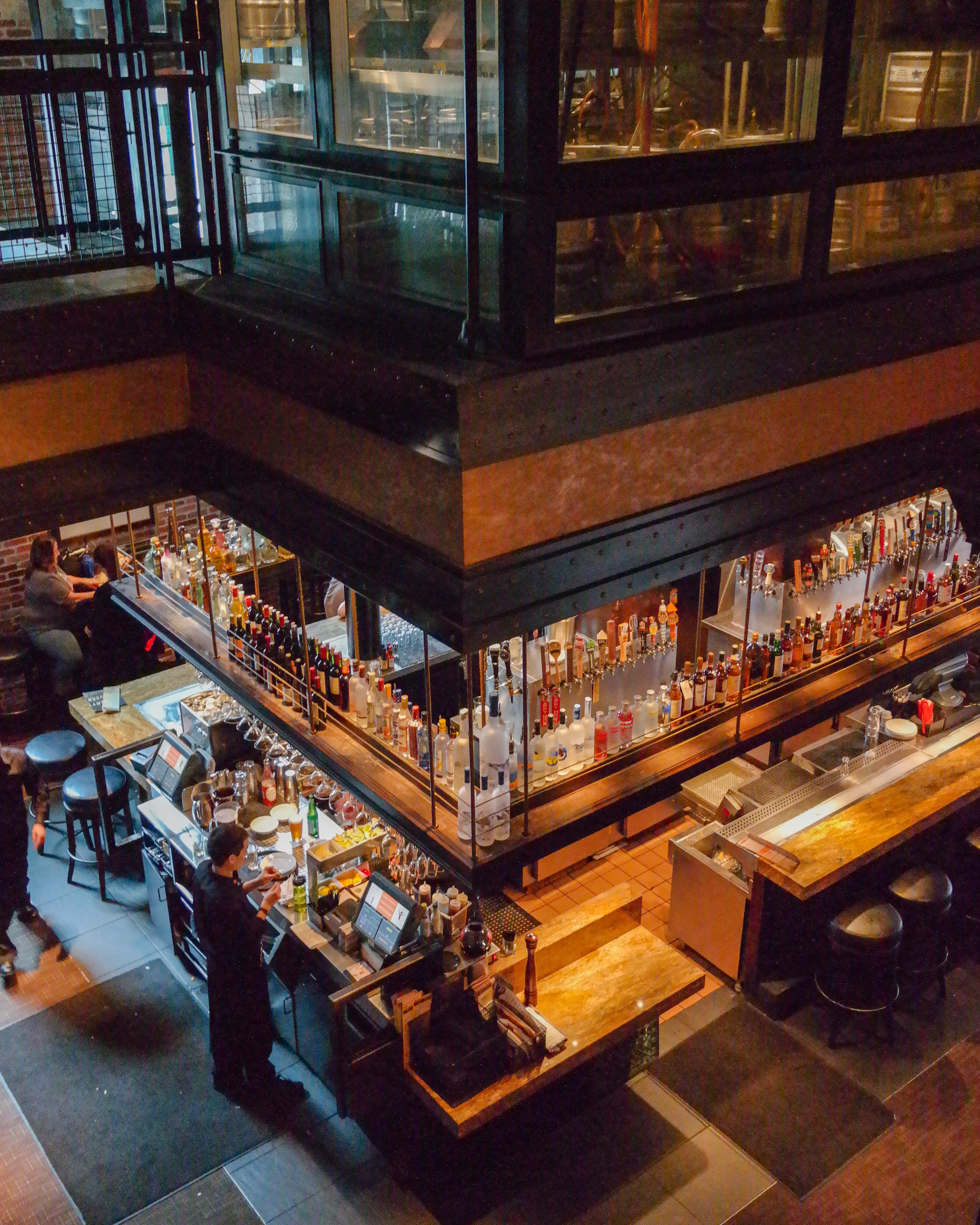
- Interior of the restaurant in Portland, Oregon's Weinhard Brewery Complex in 2014
- Industry: Restaurant
- Website: henrystavern.com

Henry's Tavern is a small chain of bars and restaurants. It currently exists in two locations, one in Portland International Airport, and another in Denver, Colorado.

== History ==
The original Henry's Tavern was a bar and restaurant in the Weinhard Brewery Complex at 12th Avenue and Burnside Street, in northwest Portland's Pearl District. Named after Henry Weinhard, the restaurant had more than 100 beers on tap. Plans for locations in Bellevue and Seattle's South Lake Union neighborhood were announced in 2017.

In July 2019, Henry's parent company, Restaurants Unlimited Inc, declared bankruptcy, and by September had closed the original Henry's location, along with its locations in Seattle, Bellevue, and Plano, Texas.

== See also ==
- List of restaurants in Denver
