= Skidmore Fountain =

Fountain and sculpture in Portland, Oregon

- U.S. Historic district – Contributing property
- Portland Historic Landmark
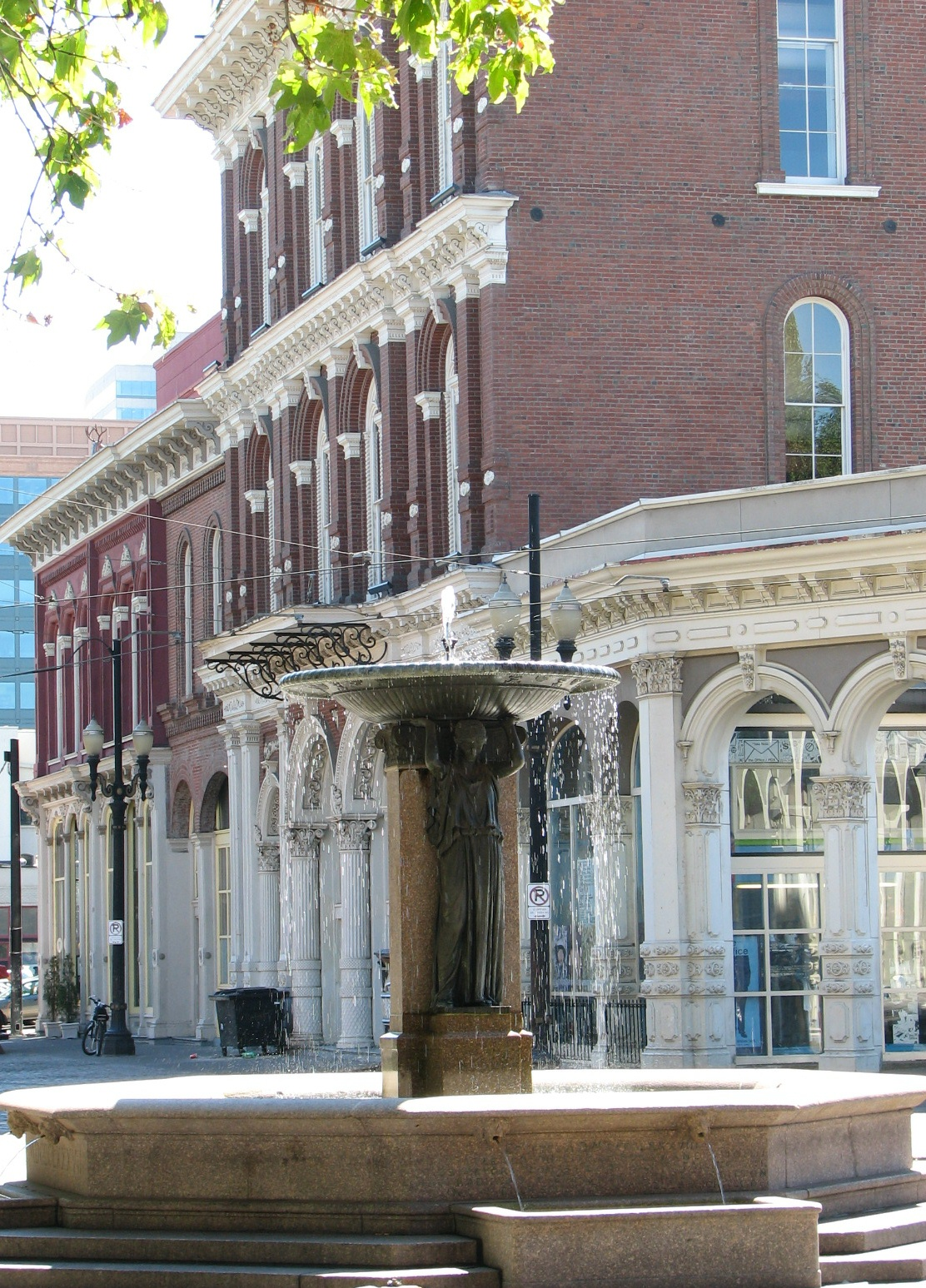
- Skidmore Fountain

- Location within Portland, Oregon
- Location: Portland, Oregon, United States
- Coordinates: 45.52240°N 122.67108°W
- Built: 1888
- Sculptor: Olin Levi Warner
- Part of: Portland Skidmore/Old Town Historic District (ID75001597)
- Designated CP: December 6, 1975

The Skidmore Fountain is a historic fountain in Portland, Oregon, United States.

The fountain is a contributing property of and the namesake for the Skidmore/Old Town Historic District, which is also a National Historic Landmark.

The fountain has also been designated a Portland Historic Landmark and underwent restoration in 2005. It is named for Stephen G. Skidmore.

== History ==
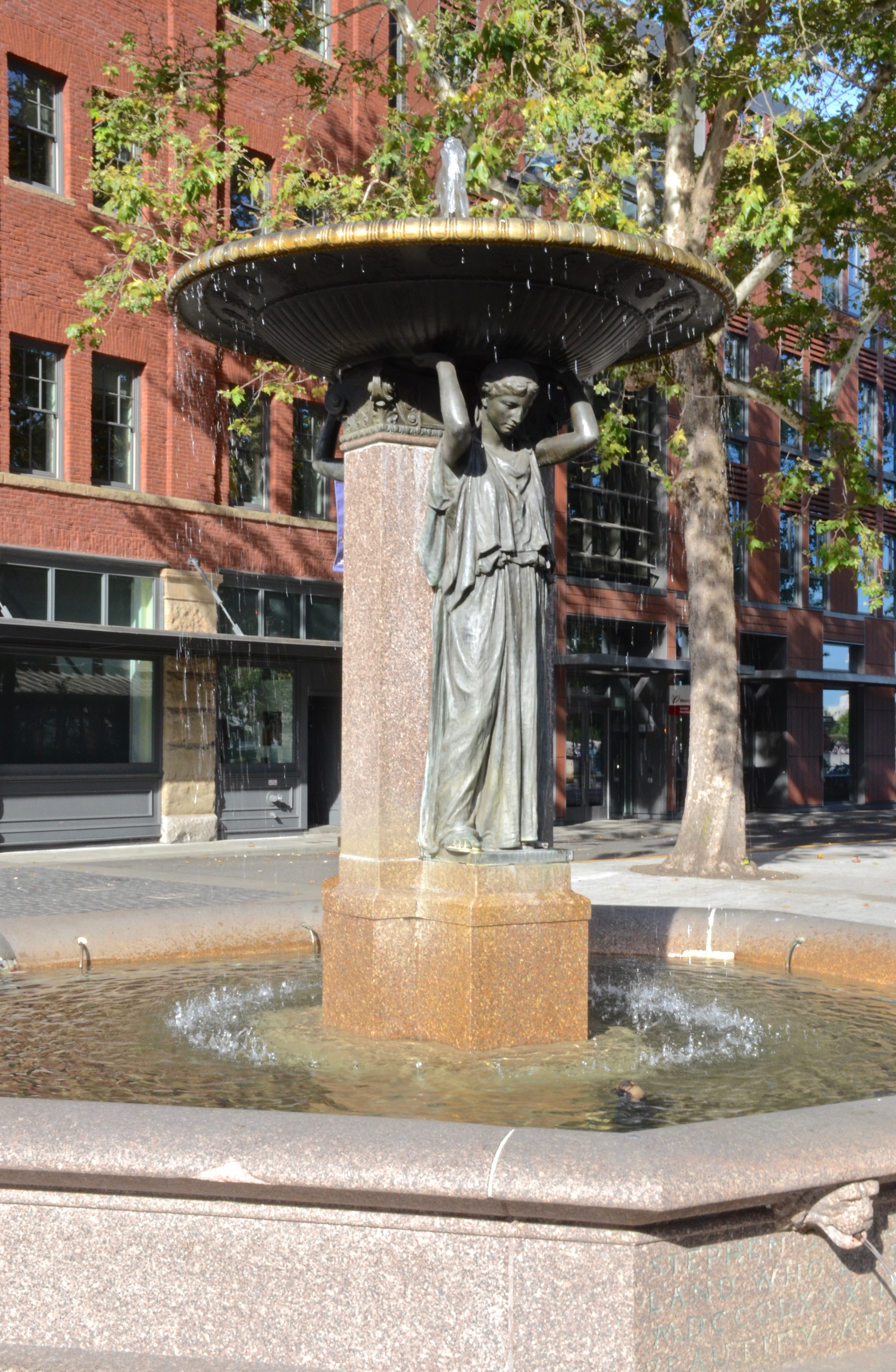
The fountain in 2015

It was dedicated September 22, 1888, in memory of Stephen G. Skidmore, a wealthy Portland druggist who died in 1883, and partly financed by his will. It was designed by sculptor Olin Levi Warner for $18,000, all of which was donated. It is styled after fountains Skidmore viewed at Versailles on his visit to the 1878 Paris Exposition and intended for "horses, men and dogs" to drink from. Henry Weinhard offered to pump beer into the fountain at the dedication. It is Portland's "oldest piece of public art".

The fountain is located near the west end of the Burnside Bridge at SW First and Ankeny streets within downtown Portland. The MAX Light Rail line runs past it and formerly had a nearby stop named after the fountain. When Portland Saturday Market is operating, the open area around the fountain attracts street performers and entertained spectators. The fountain also serves as a gathering point for several Portland events, such as SantaCon, Plunderathon, Zombiewalk and several protest/activist gatherings.

In 2003, when characterizing the neighborhood, Portland Development Commission commented, "there are significant public safety issues around the Skidmore Fountain Station under the Burnside Bridge", and said it, "experiences one of the highest drug related arrest rates in the city".

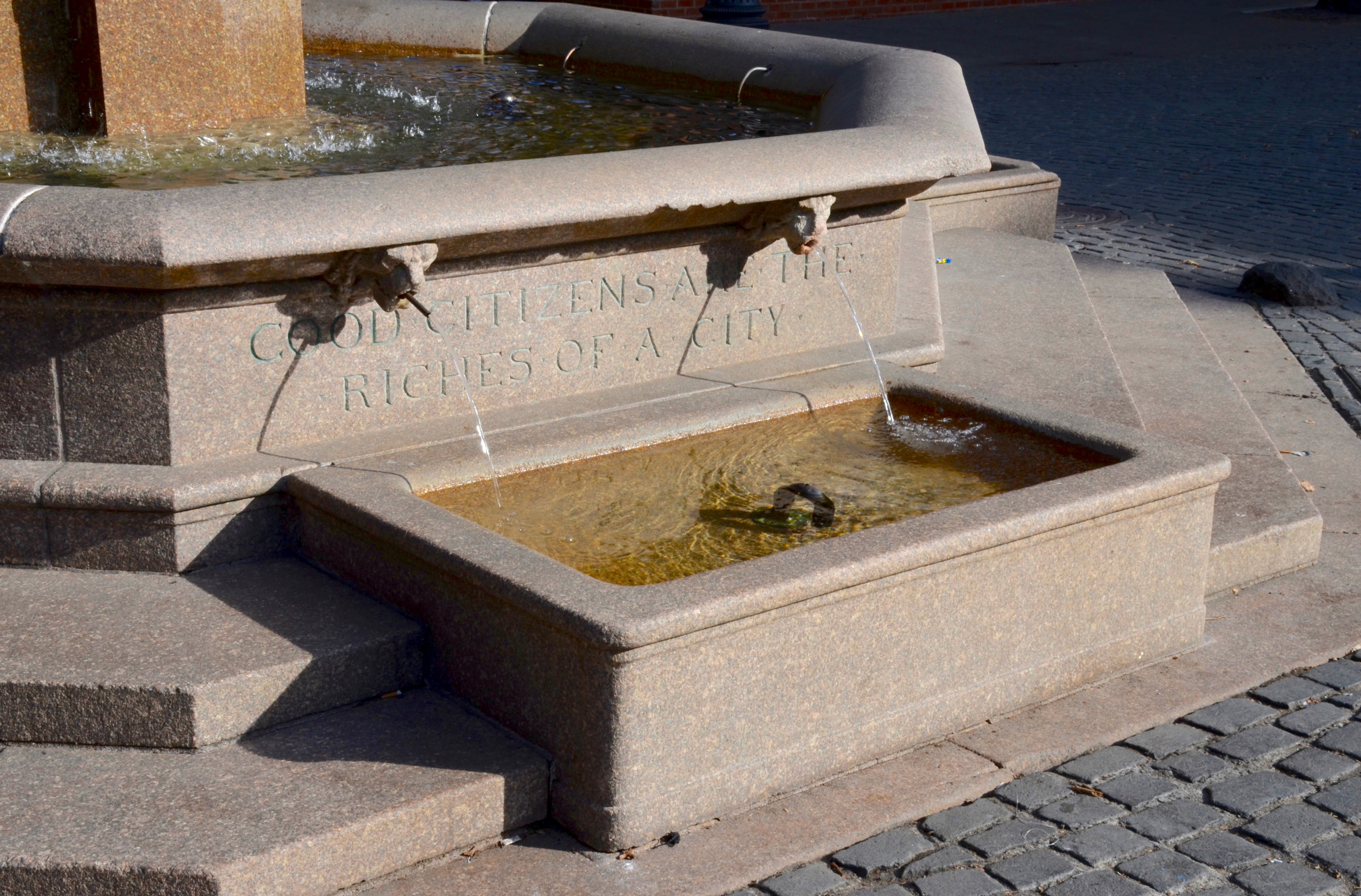
Horse trough on northwest side of the fountain, with the inscription "Good citizens are the riches of a city" above

The fountain's base has various inscriptions on its different faces. That on the northwest side is a quotation from C.E.S. Wood: "Good citizens are the riches of a city".

== See also ==
- 1888 in art
