= Four Loko =

Line of alcoholic drinks

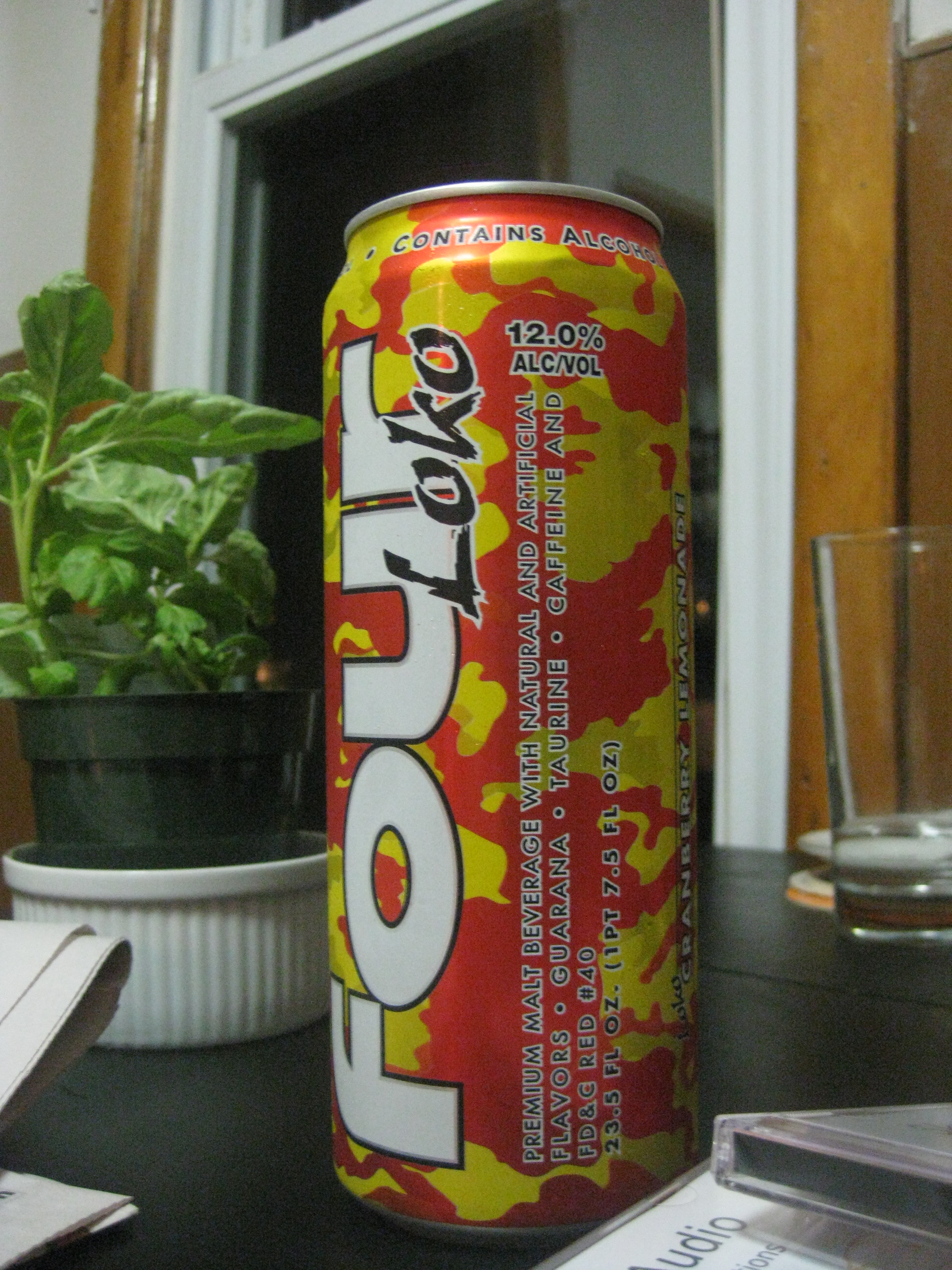
- Type: Malt beverage
- Origin: United States
- Introduced: 2005; 21 years ago
- Alcohol by volume: 6–13.9
- Flavor: Various
- Related products: Tilt, Joose, Sparks
- Website: fourloko.com

Four Loko is a line of alcoholic beverages sold by Phusion Projects of Chicago, Illinois, United States. Four Loko's previous recipe included caffeine. Phusion operates as Drink Four Brewing Company. Four Loko, the company's most popular beverage, debuted in the United States market in 2005 and is available in 49 states, and in 21 countries including Ecuador, Guatemala, Paraguay, The Bahamas, Peru, Mexico, Colombia, Bolivia, Honduras, El Salvador, Nicaragua, Costa Rica, China, Canada and some countries in Europe. The name "Four" is derived from the original drink having four "key ingredients". Despite its original possibly unsafe recipe, Four Loko is still a popular and commonly seen choice for college students and can be found in gas stations and convenience stores.

Four-branded products have been the object of legal, ethical, and health concerns related to the company allegedly marketing them to underage drinkers and the danger of combining alcohol and caffeine. After the beverage was banned in several states, a product reintroduction in December 2010 removed caffeine, taurine, and guarana as ingredients, and the malt beverage is no longer marketed as an energy drink. As of January 2026, Four Loko is still in business and producing carbonated malt beverages with sucrose and artificial coloring. The current Four Loko flavors include Sour Apple, LOKO USA, RED, Strawberry Lemonade, Sour Melon, Sour Grape, Electric Lemonade, Watermelon, Gold, Sour Galactic Punch, Jungle Juice, Peach, CAMO, Sour Blue Razz and Fruit Punch. In March 2026, Four Loko released a new "strawberry daiquiri" flavor called Jackpot.

== History ==
=== Early history ===
Phusion Projects was founded in 2005 by Chris Hunter, Jaisen Freeman and Jeff Wright after graduating from The Ohio State University. As students they were active members of Kappa Sigma fraternity, and many of their original drink blends were created in the fraternity mansion's basement and party room. They had enjoyed caffeine mixed with alcohol, and recalled buying Thai energy drinks from a nearby Asian market to sell to other students at a markup, claiming that they were "importing the stuff from abroad". They would later describe themselves as "our own target market".

In 2005, the entrepreneurial team designed a prototype "energy beer" now known as Four Loko. Marketed as a "premium malt beverage" in cherry and berry flavors, the drink contained taurine, guarana, caffeine and wormwood—the supposed psychoactive ingredient of absinthe. After a year, the company was running low on investment capital and decided to drop the wormwood, focusing instead on improving the flavor and increasing the alcohol content.

By 2008 the product had become popular and a variety of flavors were introduced into the US market. At the start of 2009, the beverage was becoming successful and began to be marketed internationally.

=== Restrictions on sale ===
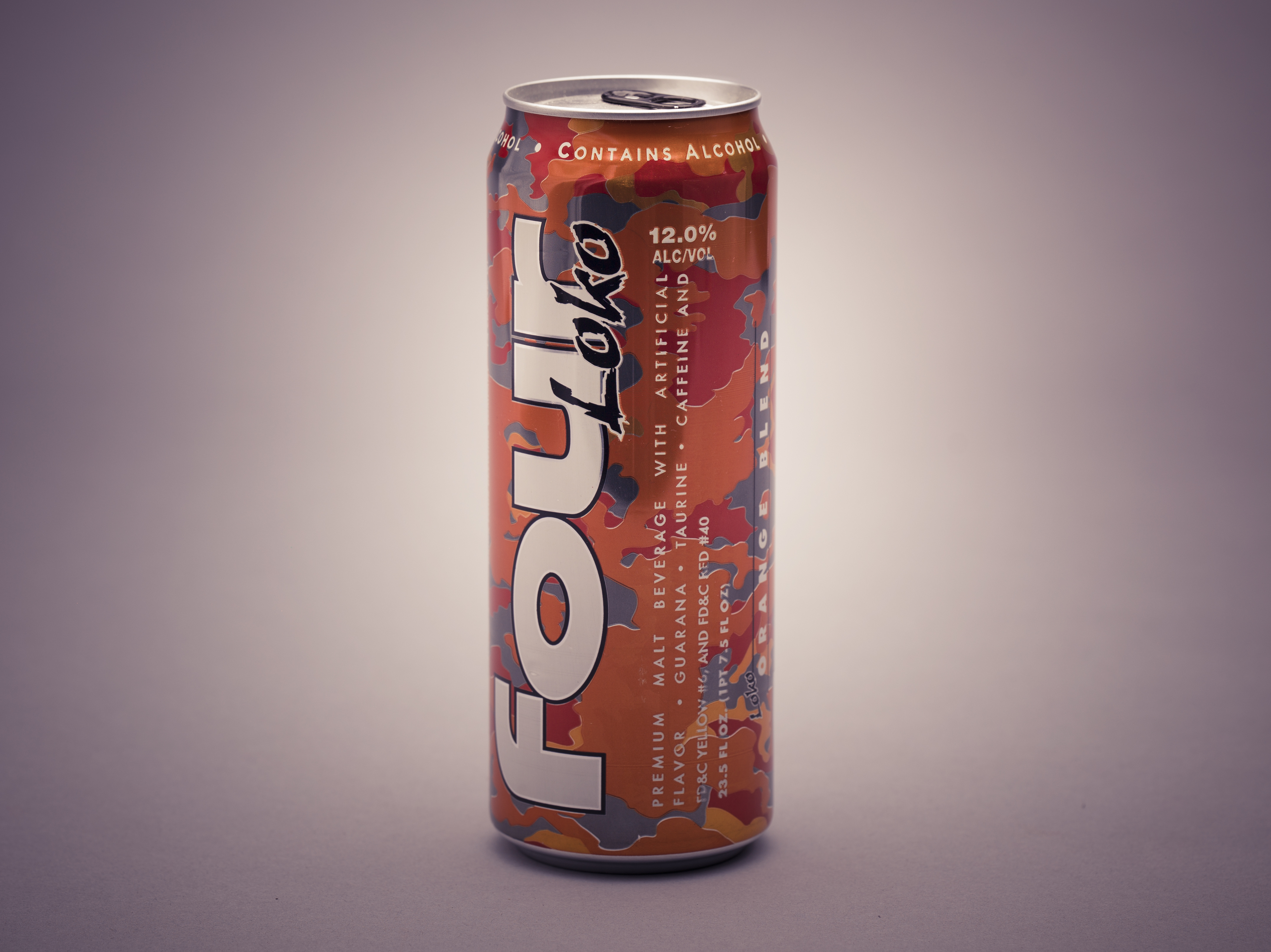
Container of "Orange Blend"-flavored Four Loko from 2010

In 2009, a group of U.S. state attorneys general began investigations of companies that produced and sold caffeinated alcohol beverages on the grounds that they were being inappropriately marketed to a teenage audience and that they had possible health risks (blackouts). The attorneys general were also concerned that these drinks could pose health risks by masking feelings of intoxication. In December 2008, Anheuser-Busch, manufacturer of Tilt and Bud Extra, as well as MillerCoors, manufacturer of Sparks, agreed to reformulate their drinks. In 2009, smaller companies, such as Phusion, fell under investigation because of their rise in market share.

The drink came under major fire in 2010, as colleges and universities across the United States began to see injuries and blackouts related to the drink's misuse. The University of Rhode Island banned the drink from their campus on November 5, 2010. The state of Washington banned Four Loko after nine university students aged 17 to 19 from Central Washington University in Ellensburg, Washington, became ill at a house party in Roslyn, Washington. The students were hospitalized with blood alcohol levels ranging from 0.12 to 0.35 percent (0.30 percent being considered potentially lethal), and one student almost died, according to CWU President James L. Gaudino.

In October 2010, following the hospitalization of seventeen students and six visitors, Ramapo College in New Jersey banned the possession and consumption of Four Loko on its campus. As a result, Worcester State University stopped the sale of all energy drinks and they, as well as Boston College, informed their students of the risks involved in consuming Four Loko. By November 2010, dozens of other colleges and universities sent out notices informing their students to avoid the drink, while several more placed outright bans on their campuses.

The Daily Collegian, Penn State's student newspaper, reported that on November 1, 2010, the Pennsylvania Liquor Control Board sent letters to all liquor stores urging distributors to discontinue the sale of the drink. The PLCB also sent letters to all colleges and universities warning them of the dangers of the drink. While the board stopped short of a ban, it asked retailers to stop selling the drink until U.S. Food and Drug Administration (FDA) findings prove they are safe. Pennsylvania State Representative Vanessa Lowery Brown, sought to introduce legislation to ban alcoholic energy drinks in the state.

Several stores, including ShopRite Super Markets, Tops Markets, Price Chopper, and Wegmans, voluntarily pulled the product from their shelves. Shortly after, then-Governor of New York David Paterson announced that Phusion was withdrawing the beverage from the state of New York as of November 19, 2010.

On November 20, 2010, Oregon Liquor Control Commission's five citizen commissioners held an emergency meeting resulting in a 4–1 vote on the ban. The ban became effective immediately and was in effect until May 18, 2011. The ban required businesses to cease the sale of alcoholic energy drinks and withdraw existing items immediately. The sale of the restricted products during this period carried a penalty of 30-day suspension of liquor license.

Utah, which has a state-run alcoholic beverage distribution system, did not allow the sale of alcoholic energy drinks. Michigan and Oklahoma voted to ban the sale of alcoholic energy drinks over health and safety concerns. Additionally, the Washington State Liquor Control Board voted to ban the sale of alcoholic energy drinks, which went into effect on November 18, 2010. The vote came as a result of the incident at Central Washington University. The New York State Liquor Authority banned their sale and distribution as of November 19, 2010. New York senator Chuck Schumer and New York City councilman James Sanders Jr. approached the Obama administration to ban Four Loko across the state of New York.

=== FDA warning ===
On November 17, 2010, the U.S. Food and Drug Administration issued a warning letter to four manufacturers of caffeinated alcoholic beverages citing that the caffeine added to their malt alcoholic beverages is an "unsafe food additive" and said that further action, including seizure of their products, could be taken under federal law. It declared that beverages that combine caffeine with alcohol, such as Four Loko energy drinks, were a "public health concern" and could not stay on the market in their current form. The FDA also stated that concerns had been raised that caffeine can mask some of the sensory cues individuals might normally rely on to determine their level of intoxication. Warning letters were issued to each of the four companies requiring them, within 15 days, to provide to the FDA, in writing, the specific steps the firms will be taking.

The four companies that received the warning letter were:

- Charge Beverages Corp.: Core High Gravity HG, Core High Gravity HG Orange, and Lemon Lime Core Spiked
- New Century Brewing Co., LLC: Moonshot
- Phusion Projects, LLC (doing business as Drink Four Brewing Co.): Four Loko
- United Brands Company Inc.: Joose and Max

=== Reformulation ===
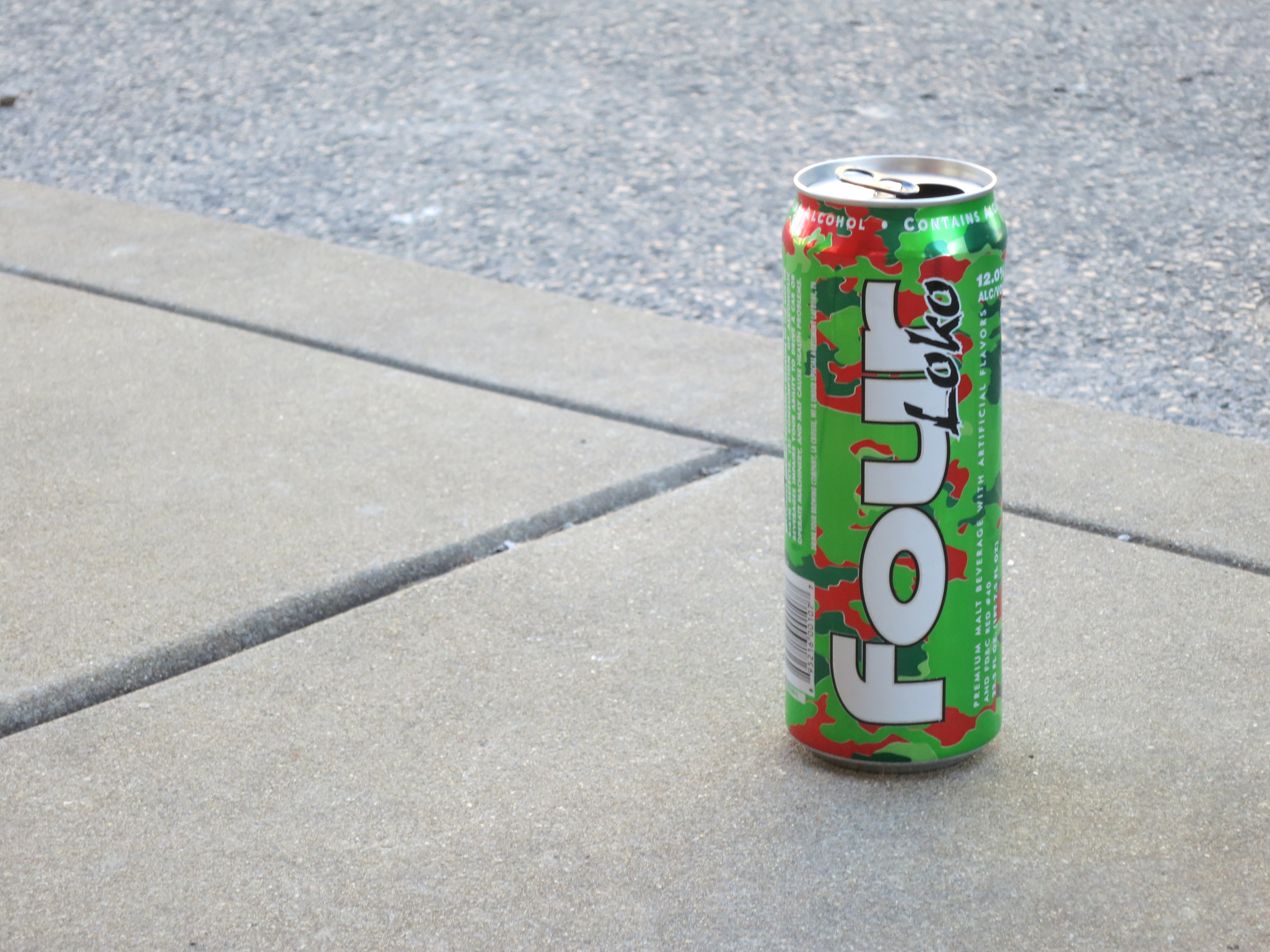
Container of reformulated Four Loko from 2013 after the caffeine was removed

In the weeks before the FDA ruling, many drinkers and people seeking financial gain purchased large quantities of the original formulation of the drink, which created a black market, with many sellers charging nearly five times the normal retail price. Four Loko appeared on Craigslist, and "collectible" cans of the drink were being sold on eBay. In late December 2010, a reformulated version of the drink was put on shelves. The new product packaging had exactly the same appearance as the original, but the caffeine, guarana, and taurine from the original drink had been removed and food coloring agent Red 40 was added.

In 2022, a new flavor called Sour Cosmic Punch was introduced, as part of a collaboration with the Warheads brand of sour candy.

== Products ==
Four Loko contains carbonated water, sugar, and natural and artificial flavoring including FD&C Red 40. The drink is sold at 6%, 7%, 8%, 10%,12%, 13.9% or 14% alcohol by volume (ABV), depending on state regulations, and is packaged in 23.5-US-fluid-ounce (690 ml) cans.

=== Current flavors ===
- Electric Lemonade
- Sour Melon
- Blue Razz
- Cosmic Sour Punch (Warheads flavor)
- Sour Grape
- Red (Swedish Fish flavor)
- Jungle Juice
- Fruit Punch
- Gold (Energy Drink flavor)
- Peach
- Sour Apple
- Strawberry Lemonade
- Watermelon
- U.S.A. (Sour Black Cherry)
- Camo
- Jackpot (Strawberry Daiquiri)

=== Discontinued flavors ===
- Black (Lime flavor)
- Uva Berry (Grape flavor)
- Blue Hurricane (Tropical flavor)
- Mango
- Orange
- Grape
- Coco Loko (Coconut flavor)
- Lemonade
- Lemon-Lime
- Margarita
- Pineapple
- Cranberry Lemonade
- Black Cherry
- Hemp
- Blaze
- Frost

In early 2011, Phusion Projects introduced its Four Loko XXX Limited Edition line, which featured a new flavor of Four Loko every few months, including:

- Blueberry Lemonade
- Strawberry Lemonade
- Blue Raspberry
- Green Apple

In the summer of 2011, Phusion introduced 12 US fl oz (350 ml) glass bottles of Four Loko, that came in packs of six and had 8% ABV as opposed to 12%. Flavors included:

- Lemonade
- Fruit Punch
- Watermelon

Bottles came in packs of six and in September 2011, Phusion introduced 16 US fl oz (470 ml) cans of their drink in hi-cone four packs known as Four Poco Loko, with 8% ABV and included flavors:

- Black cherry
- Mango
- Lemonade
- Green apple

Original formulations of both beverages were a malt liquor based, caffeinated alcoholic energy drink with added guarana and taurine.

In 2008, Phusion Projects began selling their products in Canada and Europe. The European version of Four MaXed is sold in 8.3-US-fluid-ounce (250 ml) glass bottles and aluminum cans and is spirit-based; the United States version has a malt liquor base.

In 2009, Four Loko ranked fourth in sales growth among alcoholic beverages at 7-Eleven stores in the United States.

In October 2010, a new flavor called Lemon Lime was first produced.

On November 16, 2010, Phusion Projects issued a press release announcing that the company would be reformulating all Four-brand beverages to remove caffeine, guarana, and taurine from the products. The new product was reintroduced in January 2011.

On October 25, 2013, Four Loko was distributed for the first time in Puerto Rico. Four Loko kept the standard 12% alcohol but in a reduced can size of 16 US fluid ounces (470 ml), and with only three flavors:

- Grape
- Fruit Punch
- Watermelon

In August 2016, Four Loko began selling in China. Secondary marketer Taobao claimed to still have for purchase the caffeinated version of the beverage. Four Loko has since seen market growth in Vietnam, Malaysia, Mongolia and Singapore.

In February 2017, Four Loko announced the release of two new product lines—the Bold Series and the Bartender Series.

The Four Loko Bold Series comes in 23.5 US fl oz (690 ml) cans at 14% ABV, and includes the flavors:

- Blaze
- Frost

Four Loko Bartender Series came in 16 US fl oz (470 ml) cans and containing 10% ABV, and includes the flavors:

- Blue Mofo
- Purple Hooter
- Pink Scorpion

In April 2017, Four Loko announced a line of hard liquor called Four Loko Shots that come in 750 ml bottles and are 70 proof (35% ABV). Flavors include:

- Dragon's Breath
- Green Tornado
- Screwball

In October 2020 Four Loko announced a line of bottled 13.9% ABV shots called Four Loko Pregame. Flavors include:

- Sour Blue Razz
- Lemonade
- Sour Peach
