= Clix Malt Liquor =

American brand of malt liquor

- Clix Malt Liquor
- Manufacturer: Grand Valley Brewing Company
- Introduced: 1939
- Style: Malt Liquor

Clix is a brand of malt liquor first made by the Grand Valley Brewing Company in Ionia, Michigan in 1937. It is often credited as the first malt liquor brewed in the United States. At Gluek Brewing in Minneapolis, Minnesota, Alvin Gluek had a similar idea in 1942. The style is light in body, thin and sweetish in taste, and high in alcohol.

Brewery owner 'Click' Koerber was the creator of the process and owner of the patent that details the production of Clix malt liquor.
