= Henry Weinhard's =

American beer brand

- Industry: Alcoholic beverage
- Founded: 1856
- Headquarters: Golden, Colorado
- Products: Beer
- Owner: Molson Coors Beverage Company

Blitz-Weinhard was a brand of beer first brewed in 1856 in Portland, Oregon. The brewery was owned by the brewer Henry Weinhard of the Weinhard family, who also made a line of soft drinks which survives to this day.

The Blitz-Weinhard brand was among several regional Pacific Northwest beers which were staples in that market during the decades following the repeal of Prohibition. As competition from national brands began to erode the market share of longstanding Northwest beers, Blitz-Weinhard responded by creating what many consider Oregon's first craft beer, Henry Weinhard's Private Reserve (also referred to as Henry Weinhard's or Henry's), in 1976.

== Advertising campaign ==
The company positioned Henry Weinhard’s as a premium beer through a noteworthy advertising campaign in the late 1970’s and 1980’s. The campaign featured a fictitious brand of beer called "Schludwiller" beer. A series of popular television commercials depicted Schludwiller as a beer brewed by the "California-Eastern Brewing Co." in California. In one of the ads, a "border patrolman" played by actor Dick Curtis asked Earl and Vern (the drivers of the Schludwiller Beer truck) "Well, now...where you fellas going with all that beer?" Schludwiller came complete with its own motto in Latin: Quod Nesciunt Sibi Damno Non Erit (roughly: "What They Don't Know Won't Hurt Them").

The Henry Weinhard's brand, repositioned as a quality microbrew, was able to regain and sustain its popularity. However, its favored status with beer-drinkers was not enough to save the original Portland brewery from eventual closure.

Like many businesses in the United States at the time, the Blitz-Weinhard brewery was bought and resold by a number of companies in the late 20th century, including Pabst Brewing Company and Miller Brewing Company and now MillerCoors, the U.S. business unit of Molson Coors Brewing Company. In August 2021 Molson Coors announced the end of production for Henry Weinhard's Reserve.

== Brewery ==
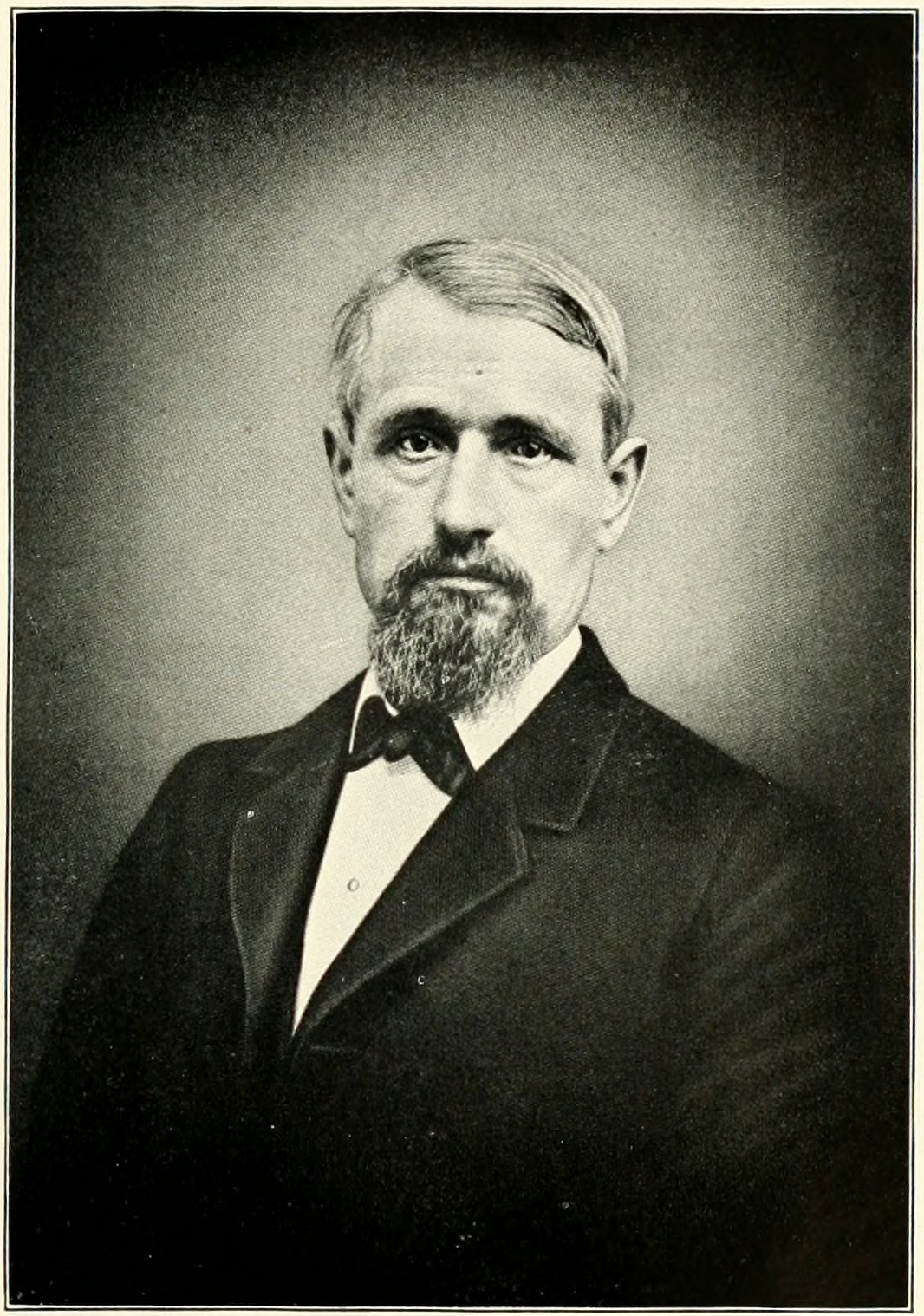
Henry Weinhard

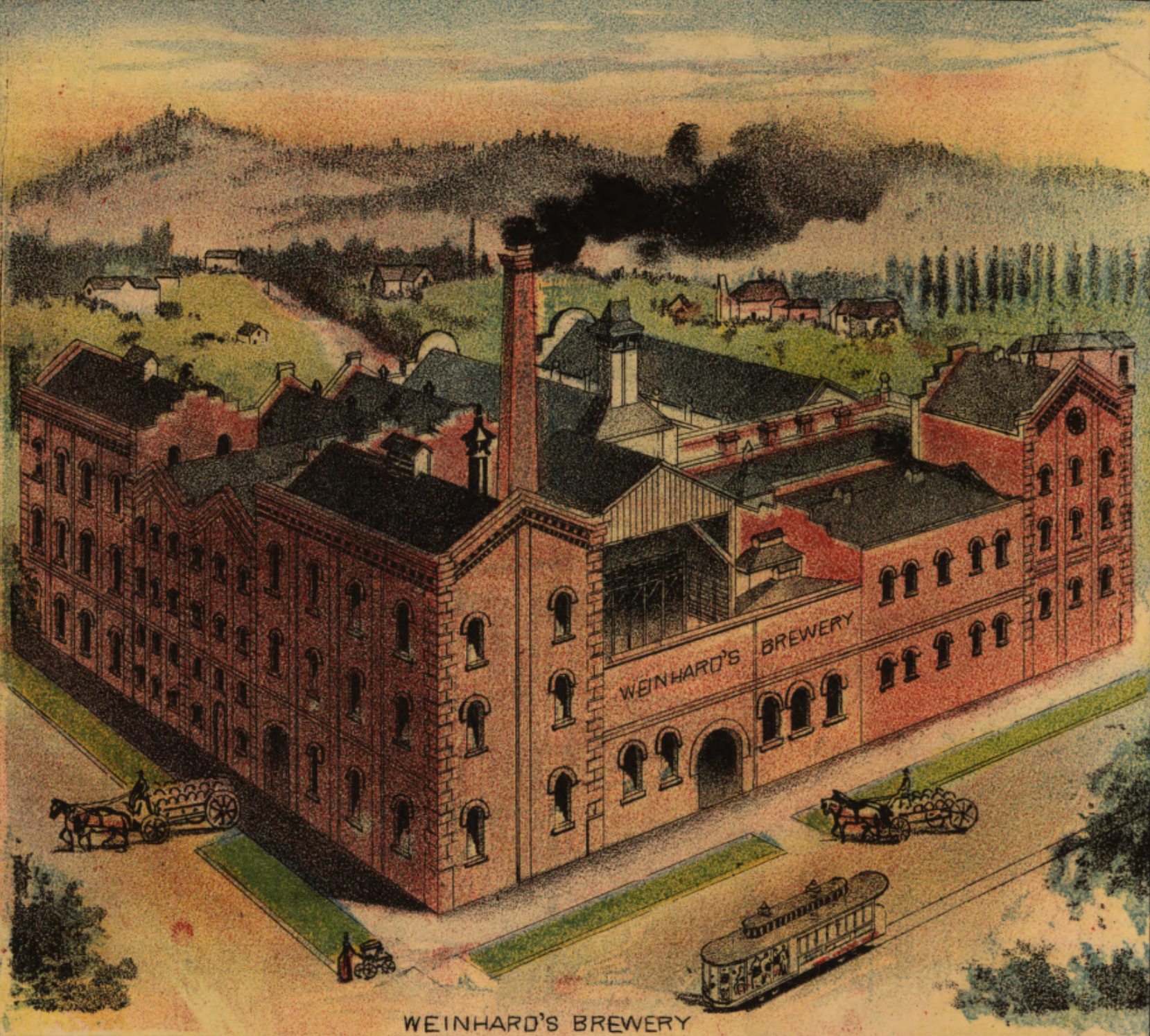
Henry Weinhard's brewery in 1890

In 1862, Henry Weinhard moved to Portland, Oregon and purchased an old brewery on the corner of Northwest First and Davis, before moving in 1864 to a facility occupying two full blocks at Northwest 12th and Burnside. This Blitz-Weinhard brewery in Portland survived as a production facility under several ownership changes until 1999, when it was sold by the Stroh Brewery Company to the Miller Brewing Company, who closed it down in late August.

The brewery was a fixture of an old industrial and warehouse district which, beginning in the 1990s, has become known as the Pearl District in downtown Portland, and its closure marked the beginning of a massive urban rejuvenation project. Following the closure of the Portland brewery in 1999, Henry Weinhard's was brewed at the Olympia brewery in Tumwater, Washington until that brewery too was closed in 2003. Some of its beers were brewed under contract at the Full Sail Brewing Company in Hood River until 2013.

Henry Weinhard's Private Reserve was slated for discontinuation as of August 2021. However, the brand was revived by Eugene, Oregon based Hop Valley Brewing in 2022.

== Gourmet sodas ==
Molson Coors Beverage Company has sought to exploit the Henry Weinhard's brand with a line of gourmet sodas, distributed out of Colfax, California. Flavors include:

- Root beer
- Vanilla cream soda
- Orange cream
- Black cherry cream
