= Great Northern Brewing Company =

Former brewery in Whitefish, Montana

Coordinates: 48.412472°N 114.336699°W

- Location: Whitefish, MT; United States
- Opened: 1994
- Annual production volume: 8,000 US beer barrels (9,400 hL)
- Website: www.greatnorthernbrewing.com

Great Northern Brewing Company was a traditional “gravity flow” brewery located in the northernmost block of downtown Whitefish, Montana. The brewery opened in 1995 under the stewardship of Minott Wessinger, the great-great grandson of Henry Weinhard. It had approximately 15,000 square feet (1,400 m^{2}) and a maximum annual capacity of 8000 barrels. The brewery permanently closed February 17, 2020. In 2021, Jeanie Konopatzke, the owner of the brand, entered an agreement with Uinta Brewing Company. Uinta became able to produce, package, and sell Great Northern's recipes.

== History ==
The Great Northern Brewing Company was built by renowned architect Joe Esherick in 1994. The brewery was built over six months, from June to December in 1994 and officially opened its doors in January 1995. Minott Wessinger, great-great-grandson of Henry Weinhard, founder of Blitz-Weinhard Brewing of Portland, Oregon, started GNBC. Built with a strong family tradition of brewing, the brewery features a three-story brewhouse tower, housing the brewing vessels and copper kettle to allow for a traditional “gravity flow” process.

After seven years of brewing Black Star, Wessinger decided to stop brewing at GNBC in order to pursue other projects. In 2002, the brewery was placed under the ownership and management of Dennis Konopatzke and GNBC continued to produce their other beers.

On February 6, 2010, fifteen years after the Great Northern Brewing Company was first built, Minott Wessinger and GNBC began to produce Black Star beer again. Subsequently, Great Northern has again ceased brewing Black Star.

Rob Isackson, a real estate developer with California-based Village Investment Partners who has owned a home in Whitefish for two decades, confirmed that his firm acquired the Black Star building, and Great Northern Brewing Company closed February 17, 2020.

== The Brewery ==
The average batch size for GNBC is 20 beer barrels (620 gallons). It takes six to eight hours to produce each batch. The brewery produced 160 barrels per week, approximately 8000 barrels per year.

== Awards ==
Beer	Category	Medal	Year	Bestower
Black Star Amber Export	American-Style Amber Lager	Silver	1998	Great American Beer Festival
Black Star Black Lager	American Dark Lager	Bronze	1999	Great American Beer Festival
Going to the Sun IPA	English-Style India Pale Ale	Silver	2018	North American Beer Awards
Good Medicine Strong Red Ale	American-Style Strong Ale	Bronze	2015	North American Beer Awards
	American-Style Strong Ale	Gold	2018	North American Beer Awards
Man Bun Doppel Schwartzbier	Baltic-Style Porter	Bronze	2017	North American Beer Awards
Wheatfish Wheat Lager	American-Style Wheat Beer with yeast	Silver	2013	Great American Beer Festival
	American-Style Wheat Beer with yeast	Bronze	2014	Great American Beer Festival
