= Joose =

Flavored malt beverage

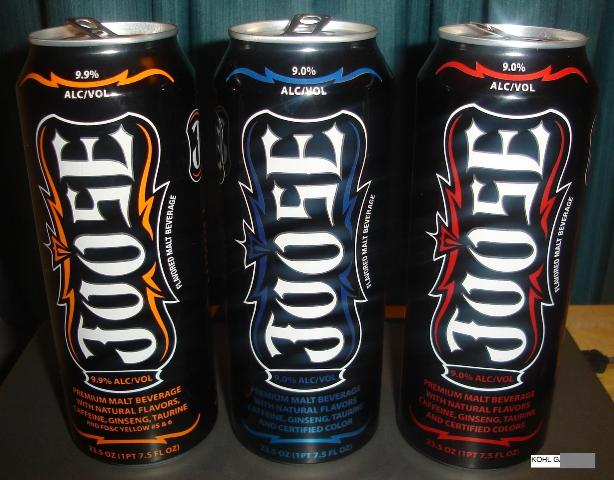
- Three cans of Joose depicting various flavors
- Type: Malt beverage/Energy drink
- Manufacturer: United Brands Company, Inc. La Mesa, California 91942
- Origin: United States
- Introduced: 2007; 19 years ago
- Proof (US): 18, 19.8, 24 and 28
- Flavor: Cherry Lime, Dragon, Green Apple, Hurricane, Joose, Jungle Juice, Fruit Punch, Gold, Kiwi Strawberry, Lemon Tea, Mamba, Margarita, Original, Panther, Raspberry Lemonade, Screwdriver, Tropical, Watermelon, Lemon Lime, Orange N Cream.
- Variants: Orange (9.9% ABV); Tropical (9% ABV); Cranberry (9% ABV); Dragon (9.9% ABV); Jungle (9.9%ABV); Mamba (9.9% ABV); Panther (9.9% ABV); Watermelon (12% ABV); Green Apple (12% ABV); Fruit Punch (12% ABV and 14% ABV); Raspberry Lemonade (12% ABV); Mango (12% ABV); Kiwi Strawberry (14% ABV); Orange N Cream (14% ABV); Lemon Lime (14% ABV)
- Related products: Four, Sparks, Tilt
- Website: http://www.drinkjoose.com

Joose (pronounced "juice") is a flavored malt beverage introduced by United Brands Co. in 2005. Joose is the first premium malt beverage at 9.9% ABV in a 24 oz can. It is also sold at 12% ABV and 14% ABV in a 23.5 oz can.

== Product line ==
According to its packaging, Joose previously contained caffeine, taurine, ginseng, and certified colors. Now, the reformulated Joose products are flavored malt beverages. Joose is available in 23.5 and 12 oz cans and the flavors are Green Apple, Dragon, Kiwi Strawberry, Classic Margarita, Strawberry Margarita, Peach Margarita, Spicy Mango Margarita, Screwdriver, Hurricane, Mango, Orange N Cream, Lemon Lime, Fruit Punch, Blue Lemonade, and Black Berry. The drink is available in a variety of 6–14% ABV contents.

== New formula ==
On November 17, 2010, the US Food and Drug Administration warned four companies, including United Brands Company Inc, that the caffeine added to their malt alcoholic beverages is an “unsafe food additive” and said that further action, including seizure of their products, may occur under federal law. In a press release, the FDA states "there is evidence that the combinations of caffeine and alcohol in these products pose a public health concern.” They also state that concerns have been raised that caffeine can mask some of the sensory cues individuals might normally rely on to determine their level of intoxication. Warning letters were issued to each of the four companies requiring them to provide to the FDA in writing within 15 days of the specific steps the firms will be taking.

United Brands Company obliged, having caffeine removed from all Joose products, reformulated and released the new beverage. New products are distributed throughout the United States, including the Spiked Tea line, which comes in three flavors: Sweet Peach, Wild Raspberry and Spiked Lemonade.
