= Weinhard Brewery Complex =

Historic building complex in Portland, Oregon, U.S.

- U.S. National Register of Historic Places
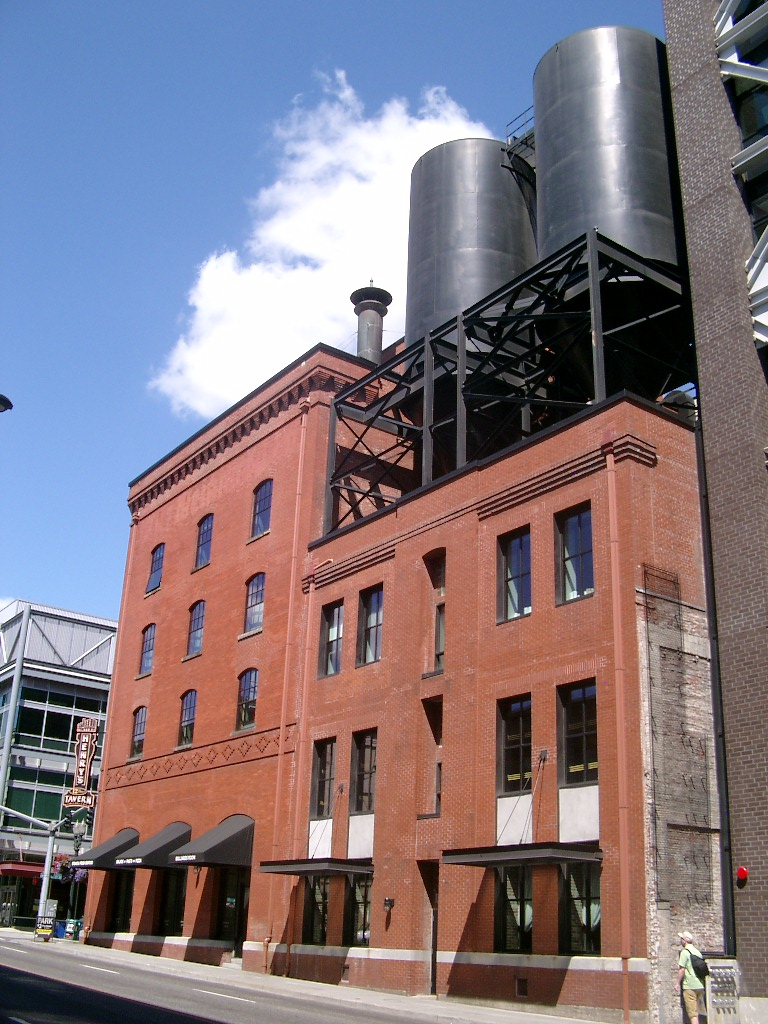
- The main brewhouse, viewed from the southeast in 2002

- Location within Portland, Oregon Location within Oregon Location within the United States
- Location: Portland, Oregon
- Coordinates: 45°31′23″N 122°40′56″W
- Built: 1908
- Architect: Whidden & Lewis
- Architectural style: Romanesque
- NRHP reference No.: 00001018
- Added to NRHP: August 23, 2000

The Henry Weinhard Brewery complex, also the Cellar Building and Brewhouse and Henry Weinhard's City Brewery, is a former brewery in Portland, Oregon. Since 2000, it has been listed on the National Register of Historic Places. In that same year, construction began to reuse the property as a multi-block, mixed-use development known as the Brewery Blocks.

== Architecture ==
The firm of Whidden & Lewis, Portland's pioneering architects, designed the Brewhouse. The building is designed in a medieval Tuscan style. Completed in 1908, other businesses in the area hired architects to emulate this design theme when building their own warehouses and industrial buildings. At its highest level, the structure has six floors. The structure is actually two buildings that appear as one: The Brewhouse (on the north side of the block), and the Malt and Hop Building (facing Burnside Street).

== History ==
Henry Weinhard purchased an existing brewery on this site, the City Brewery, in 1864. He then moved his operations to the then-two block site on West Burnside Street. Business boomed, and between 1865 and 1872 two additional blocks to the north were purchased. As many breweries also owned the saloons that sold their beer at the time, a large business empire owning properties throughout the Northwest, from San Francisco to Canada was run from here. Weinhard's brewing business continued to expand to the point where he even offered to pipe beer directly to the Skidmore Fountain. This offer was declined by civic leaders. By 1890, the brewery produced 100,000 barrels of beer annually.

The present buildings were completed in 1908 in order to meet the expanding brewing needs of the Henry Weinhard brewing empire, now serving the Pacific Northwest and even the Philippines and China. Once Prohibition was enacted, the brewery managed to survive by brewing near-beer (a brew of less than 0.5 percent alcohol), syrups and sodas – such as root beer, becoming a local bottler of national brands. Vanilla cream and other syrup products were marketed as "Gourmet Elixirs".

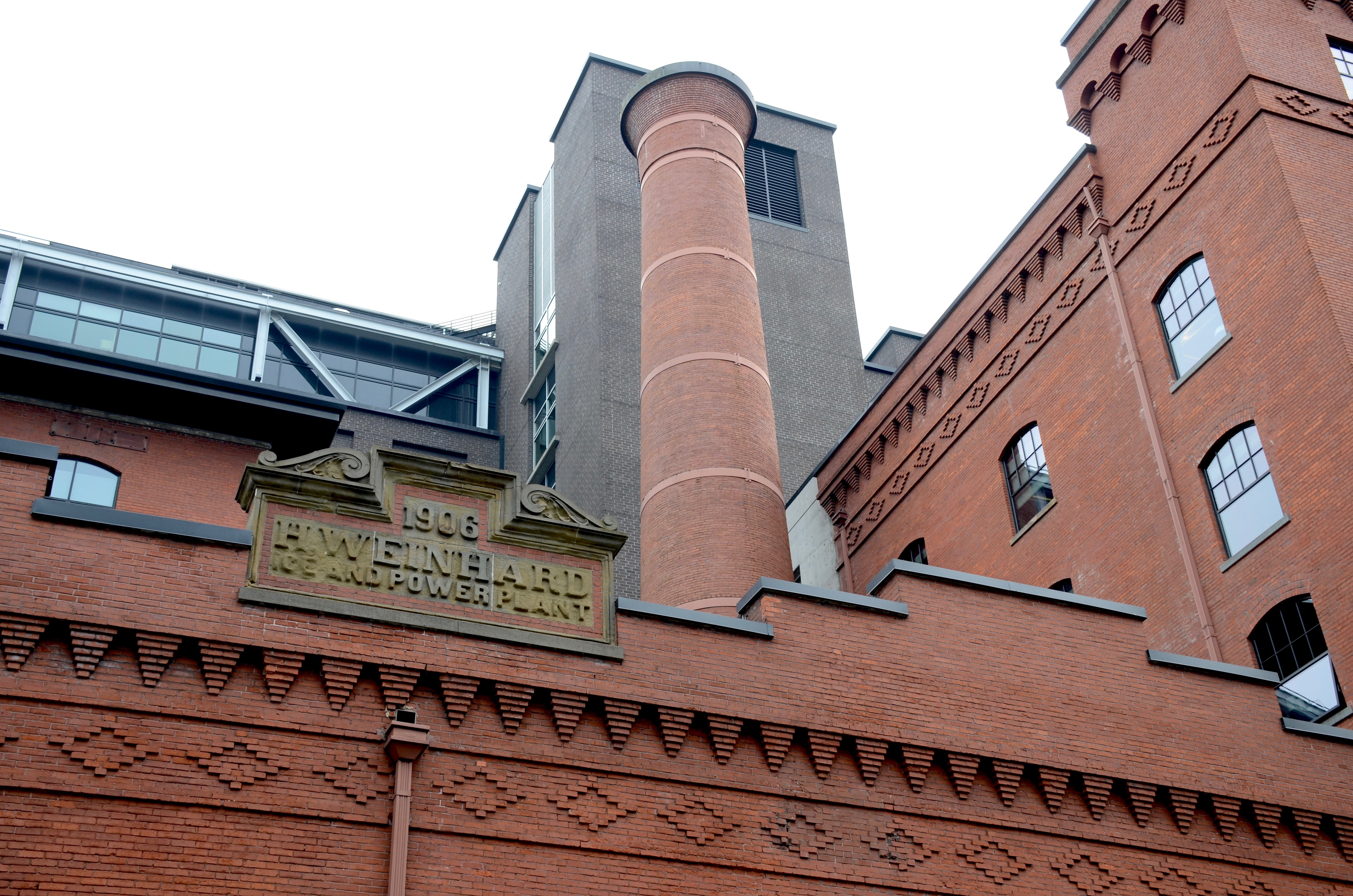
Detail view of signage and decorative brickwork on the west façade and also the north façade of the six-story Malt House and Hop Building

Mergers with and sales to other breweries occurred over the years. A merger with competitor Portland Brewing brought the Blitz name into the formal name of the brewery. Arnold Blitz, who had owned Portland Brewing, became Chairman of the new Blitz-Weinhard company. The new company took 20 years to modernize the brewery and recover from Prohibition, which ended in 1933.

In 1979, Blitz-Weinhard was sold to the Pabst Brewing Company, which sold it to Stroh Brewing Company in 1996. The last and final sale of the company in 1999 had major effects on the brewery building. Stroh's sold the Henry Weinhard's brand to Miller Brewing Company, which moved all Henry's brewing operations to the Olympia Brewery in Tumwater, Washington. After nearly 135 years of continual operations, the Weinhard Brewery brewed its last beer on August 27, 1999, and was put up for sale the following month.

== Redevelopment ==
In early 2000, local developers Gerdling-Edlen purchased the entire brewing complex, which consisted of five blocks by the end of brewing operations. GBD proceeded to develop a mixed-use area consisting of offices, retail, and condo towers known as the Brewery Blocks. As part of the project, historic buildings were to be preserved and integrated into the new development. The brewhouse's historical importance was recognized with a listing on the National Register of Historic Places, along with the A.B. Smith Building's art deco facade, in August 2000, a year after brewing had ceased.

The renovated Brewhouse was completed in November 2002, after two years of extensive renovations. The west side of the Brewhouse's low as developed into Brewery Tower, an office building. The upper floors of the historic buildings are office space, and the first floors contain retail. Henry's 12th Street Tavern, opened in 2004 in the Brewhouse building, continued the building's historical connection to beer, until the tavern's closure in 2019. The building was awarded an LEED certification. Block 1 of the complex was sold to Menlo Equities in 2024 for $21 million.

== See also ==
- Architecture of Portland, Oregon
- List of defunct breweries in the United States
- National Register of Historic Places in Northwest Portland, Oregon
