= Mickey's =

Malt liquor beverage brand

- Manufacturer: Miller Brewing Company
- Alcohol by volume: 5.6
- Style: Malt Liquor

Mickey's is an American brand of malt liquor owned by the Miller Brewing Company, a subsidiary of Molson Coors. It has a 5.6% ABV.

The brand was created by Sterling Brewery in Evansville, Indiana, which brewed it from 1962 through 1972, when the company was purchased by the G. Heileman Brewing Company. In 1996, G. Heileman was acquired by the Stroh Brewery Company who then sold the brand to Miller during their 1999 closure.

Mickey's is known for its bright green barrel-shaped, waffle-ribbed wide-mouthed 12-ounce bottle. It features an image of a hornet on the label and the cap, and rebus puzzles beneath it.

At some point Mickey's began to sponsor the Ultimate Fighting Championship, using the phrase, "Get Stung", and has featured several UFC fighters on 24 ounce cans.

Mickey's is available in traditional sizes (16, 22, 32, and 40 ounce sizes); it was once found in 64 ounce bottles.

== Popular culture ==
There is a reference to Mickey's in the track "Frank's Wild Years" by Tom Waits on his 1983 album Swordfishtrombones where, on his way home from work, the song’s title character "stopped at the liquor store, picked up a couple of Mickey's Big Mouths, and drank them in the car down by the Shell station."

There is also a reference to Mickey’s in the track “Panhandlin’ Prince” by Ugly Kid Joe from their 1992 album America's Least Wanted which contains the lyrics “Sitting on a rusty park bench, baby. Not much else to do. Smoke cigarettes and drink my Mickey’s Fine Malt Liquor Brew”
