= Tilt (drink) =

Alcoholic beverage

- Type: Malt beverage, energy drink
- Manufacturer: Anheuser-Busch
- Origin: United States
- Introduced: August 2005
- Alcohol by volume: 4-6.6% (in 16oz cans), 12% (in 24oz cans, 2005-2011), 8% (in 24oz cans
- Color: Blue, Green, Red, Purple, Pinkish Red
- Flavor: Berry, Lemon Lime, Fruit Punch, Grape, Watermelon, Piña Colada
- Variants: Tilt Red
- Related products: Four Loko, Joose, Red Bull, Sparks

Tilt was an alcoholic beverage launched by Anheuser-Busch in the United States in August 2005. It was sold in 16 and 24 fluid ounce cans. Its alcoholic content by volume varied. In 16oz cans, it ranged from 4-6.6% depending on state laws. In 24oz cans, its alcoholic content by volume was originally 12%, but was later lowered to 8% in 2010. The drink was reformulated in 2008.

== History ==
Tilt was introduced as an energy drink containing alcohol, and marketed as a "Premium Malt Beverage". The original formulation's active ingredients included caffeine, ginseng and guaraná. In 2008, a reformulated Tilt was launched with only caffeine. Budweiser changed the formulation for similar reasons to Miller Brewing Company, manufacturer of Sparks.

The drink was discontinued in 2008, after health concerns were raised about combining alcohol and caffeine. Under pressure from special interest groups, which in turn put pressure on state governments, caffeine was later banned as well, with the drink's marketing to underage consumers and allegedly false statements being cited as reasons. In September 2010, Tilt was remade in a twenty four fluid ounce can similar to Four Loko.

== Related products ==
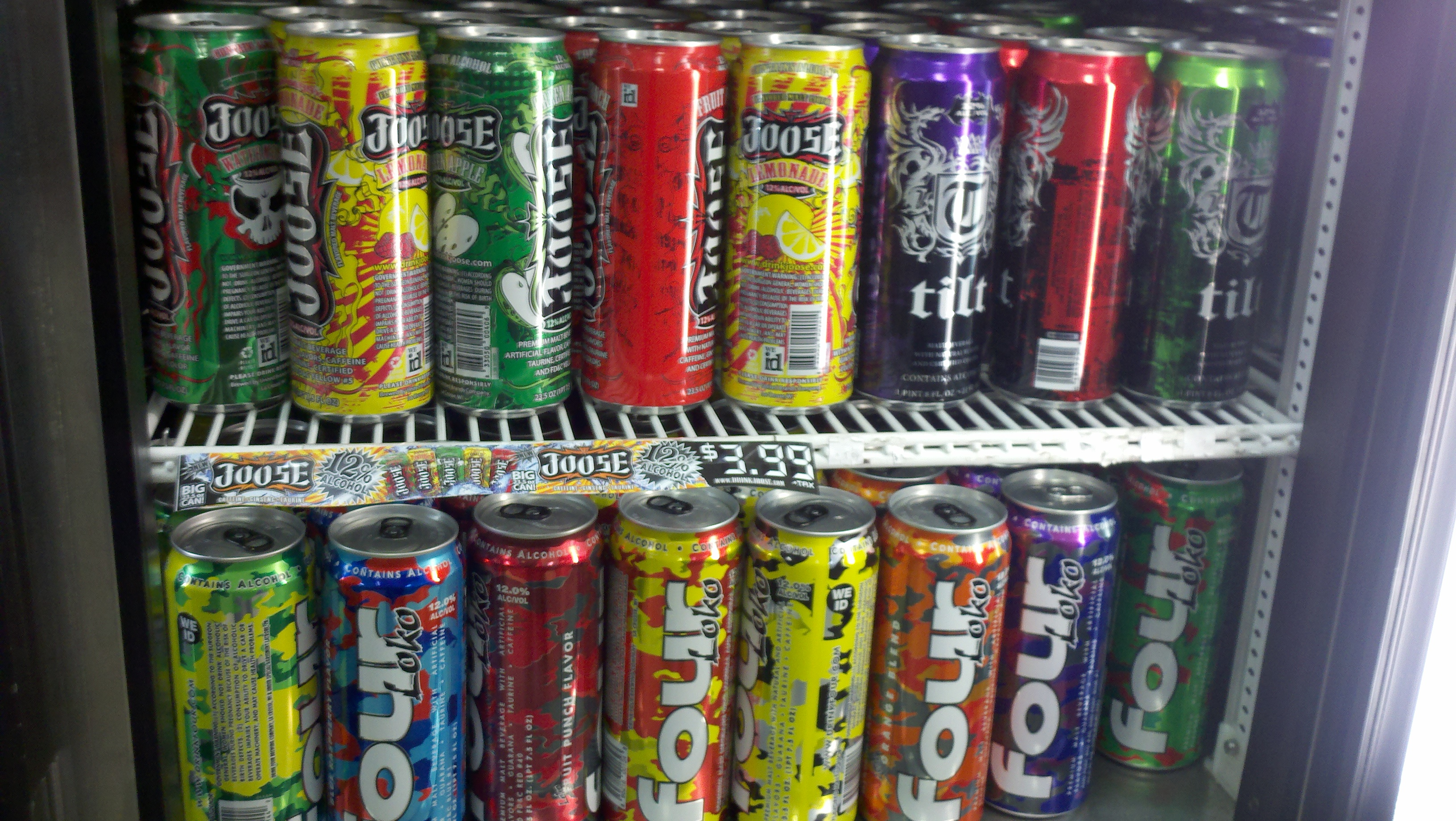
Tilt and related drinks for sale (2010)

Other "malternatives" that used similar energy formulations include Four Loko, Joose, and Sparks. Tilt's alcoholic content by volume is similar to various formulations of these other drinks. The formulations for all US malt beverages containing caffeine changed between 2010 and 2011 due to pressure from Washington, DC lobbyists and the Food and Drug Administration.

The U.S. Centers for Disease Control and Prevention had also delivered findings that these drinks were particularly in vogue with minors, and were likely to cause blackouts and other health risks, and increased the likelihood of a rape occurring, both on the part of the rapist and the victim. These findings, combined with parental outcry, led to a ban on caffeinated alcoholic beverages in the United States.
