= Sparks (drink) =

Alcoholic beverage

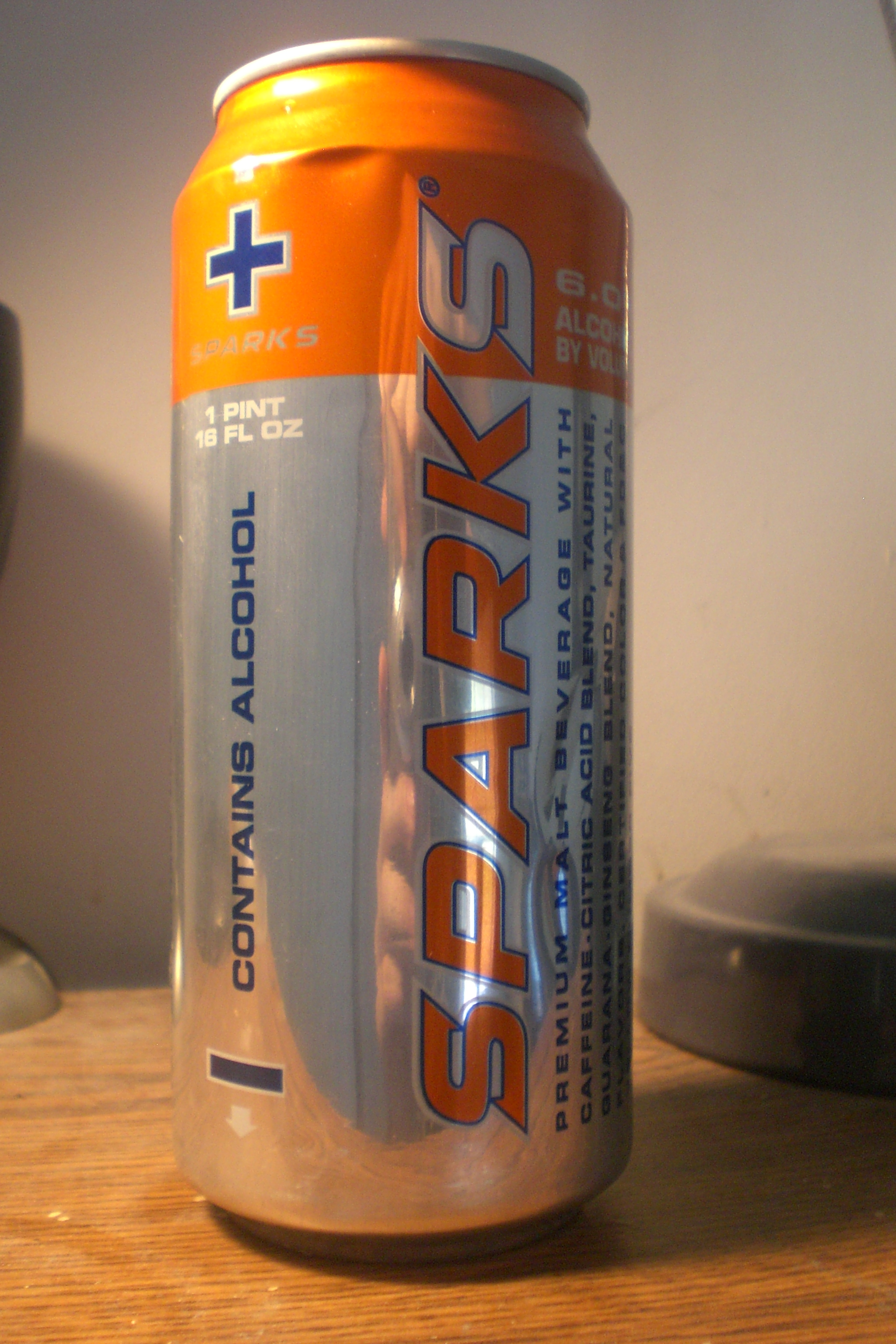
- Type: Malt beverage/Energy drink
- Manufacturer: Steel Brewing
- Origin: United States
- Introduced: 2002; 23 years ago
- Discontinued: 2008; 17 years ago
- Proof (US): 12
- Color: FD&C Yellow No.5
- Variants: Sparks Light, Sparks Plus, Sparks Red, Sparks Lemon Stinger, Sparks Blackberry
- Related products: Budweiser energy drink, Red Bull, Tilt, Four, Joose
- Website: http://www.sparks.com

"Sparks was the innovator and creator of energy beer. The category didn't really exist before Sparks came out."

— Pete Marino, spokesman, Miller Brewing Company, 2006

Sparks was an alcoholic beverage that debuted in the US market in 2002. The original formulation contained caffeine, one of the first alcoholic beverages to do so. Its other original active ingredients included taurine, ginseng and guarana, common to energy drinks.

Packaged in a can, its labeling indicates a 6% alcoholic content by volume. Its flavor was similar to other energy drinks such as Red Bull, Monster Energy, and Rockstar, with a tart, sugary taste. Sparks' final formulation did not contain caffeine or taurine. Original packaging was a 16 oz (475 mL) silver can with bright orange tops, with a "+" printed near the top and a "–" printed near the bottom, intended to be reminiscent of a battery.

Other varieties included a sugar-free "Sparks Light" version with a bright blue top. Higher-alcohol versions, named "Sparks Plus" (black top, 7% alcohol), "Sparks Red" (red top, 8% alcohol), and "Sparks Stinger" (yellow top, 8% alcohol) are packaged in both 16oz and 24oz cans. Sparks released an iced tea, lemonade and blackberry flavor in the early 2010s but quickly shrank their product line to only two flavors- original orange and blackberry. Those two flavors were available until August 2021 when current owners, Molson Coors, decided to discontinue the orange and blackberry flavors (the only two that existed at the time).

== History ==
Created in 2002 by San Francisco–based beverage marketing firm McKenzie River Corporation, early marketing relied on word of mouth primed by giving away large quantities of the beverage. Between 2003 and 2005, it had a 107% compound annual growth rate.

On July 3, 2006, Miller Brewing Company announced it had entered into an agreement to acquire Sparks from McKenzie River Corp. for $215 million, with acquisition completed on August 14, 2006. Miller had been producing Sparks prior to this purchase. It is currently producing it under the Steel Brewing Company label of Milwaukee, Wisconsin.

In September 2008, the Center for Science in the Public Interest, a Washington, D.C.–based non-profit watchdog and consumer advocacy group, sued MillerCoors, claiming that its Sparks alcoholic beverages that include caffeine are a health hazard.

Three months later, at the behest of San Francisco and 13 states, distributor MillerCoors LLC announced it would remove the caffeine from its Sparks line of energy drinks, and would change its marketing campaign. "We're doing it to protect the public health of our young people and to reform business practices," said S.F. City Attorney Dennis Herrera.
