= Plunderathon =

Pirate-themed festival in Portland, Oregon

- Official logo
- Date: June 13, 2015
- Frequency: annual
- Location: Portland, Oregon
- Inaugurated: 2004
- Participants: 100-200 pirates
- Attendance: 2,000-3,000
- Budget: Donation based
- Patron: Public

Plunderathon is an annual pirate-themed festival in Portland, Oregon, United States that usually coincides with Fleet Week or the Rose Festival. Plunderathon is run by a group calling itself "the Infernal Order of Pirates, Buccaneers, Scallywags, and Privateers" that prides itself on a heavy disinformation campaign leading up to the event, often issuing press statements that flatly contradict previous ones and making "historical" claims of Plunderathons from over a century ago. Throughout the event, the designated historian will often be called upon to recite the history of the Order in exchange for rum, which he or she does by making it up on the spot and claiming authenticity.

Plunderathon is not tied to any venue or location, but is a mobile combination of a parade, bar crawl and public art spectacle very similar to the CacophonySociety's SantaCon.

Participants dress up as pirates, make "ships" out of shopping carts and parade through town for around 10 hours, mostly in the Old Town/Chinatown, Downtown and Vaseline Alley areas. Costumes range from cheap party store items to high-quality theatrical costumes. The 2006 Plunderathon had over 120 pirates and featured a treasure chest-shaped piñata that was full of condoms and a beanbag fight (called "cannonball fight") in the North Park Blocks. They also visited the Shanghai tunnels, walked completely through Powell's Books, the Pearl District, pushed the ship/cart through the US Bancorp Tower and blocked traffic on several downtown streets while moving from one place to another in long single-file lines.

The new Plunderathon logo, released on their website in January 2008, states the elements of the logo are: A skull with mugs tilted away from the center, handles upward, in the place of eyesockets. Rum bottles tilted together take the place of nasal passages, crossed unadorned bones lie behind the skull. In a circle around the skull and crossed bones, from the lower left end of the cross to the lower right, is the text "the Infernal Order of Pirates, Buccaneers, Scallywags, Privateers and Grocery Store Clerks." Under the cross is the text "Est. 1843" for the year of the first Plunderathon. As long as these elements exist and nothing is added to it, the logo is used to identify those who have participated in Plunderathon. Pirates who have split from Plunderathon and gone out on their own omit the text "the Infernal Order of Pirates, Buccaneers, Scallywags, Privateers and Grocery Store Clerks" but retain "Est. 1843" out of respect for their roots.

The 2007 Plunderathon was a record-setting 250 Pirates in size overall (though at any one point numbers topped out at 180) and featured a compressed-air cannon that shot sex toys, chocolate coin and small toys at passers by, as well as a large rubber band war and an invasion of the Pride Festival. The Portland pirate rock band Sunken Chest played a rock'n set at the Ash Street Saloon. The flagship for 2007 was the H.M.S. Venture (named after the Adult Swim cartoon The Venture Bros., which replaced the 2006 flagship, the H.M.S. Birdman). The Venture was the first flagship to survive a Plunderathon intact. Another ship, the Flaming Molly, was shanghaied before the end of the event and its wreckage was found in Old Town a week later, next to a chocolate shop.

Plunderathon has been featured in The Oregonian's Culturepulp comic as well as local newspapers such as The Portland Mercury, The Daily Oregonian, and the Willamette Week. The event is adults-only and event organizers have threatened on their blog to call child protective services on any parent who brings kids to the event.

== See also ==
- Culture of Portland, Oregon
