= St. Ides =

Malt liquor

- Manufacturer: Pabst Brewing Company
- Alcohol by volume: 8.2%
- Style: Malt Liquor

St. Ides is a malt liquor manufactured by the Pabst Brewing Company. The beverage contains 8.2% alcohol by volume, which is stronger than many high-alcohol malt liquors. It was launched by the McKenzie River Corporation in 1987. St. Ides gained prominence during the late 1980s and early 1990s through the use of celebrity endorsements by rap artists.

The beer is also available in a number of "St. Ides Special Brews" which have a variety of flavorings, including various fruit flavors.

== Marketing ==
The St. Ides brand has used celebrity endorsements by rappers and was unique in its early use of hip hop to build the brand's identity. DJ Pooh was brought in to design advertisements for the liquor and was given broad artistic license. In such contexts, the beer was often referred to as the "Crooked I".

In 1994, Chuck D took a stance against malt liquor advertising and sued the brand's then-owner, the McKenzie River Brewing Company, for using his voice without his permission. The controversy generated significant publicity for St. Ides, placed it on the average hip hop listener's radar, and was settled out of court. Another lawsuit was filed in 1991 by the New York State Attorney General's Office for advertisements allegedly targeting underage minority children. While the lawsuit was settled out of court and without admitting any guilt, the company agreed to pay the state $50,000 to cover the cost of the investigation and stop touting its alcohol content.

The brand was fined and shutdown for three days in 1991 by the Bureau of Alcohol, Tobacco and Firearms. While the brand maintained that it has not purposefully targeted minors, it agreed to produce advertisements warning against underage drinking, drunk driving, and public service announcements promoting safe sex.

In 1994, a free promotional tape was released featuring the music in advertisements from Snoop Doggy Dogg, Warren G, Nate Dogg, MC Eiht, Scarface, Ice Cube and Wu-Tang Clan. In July 1997, St. Ides released "St. Ides Special Blend Freeze And Squeeze", but had to suspend sales and marketing nationwide 24 days later due to concerns over underage consumption, marketing, and product placement.

McKenzie discontinued the brand in 1998 before it was purchased by Pabst Brewing Company.
