= Malt liquor =

Beer with high alcohol content

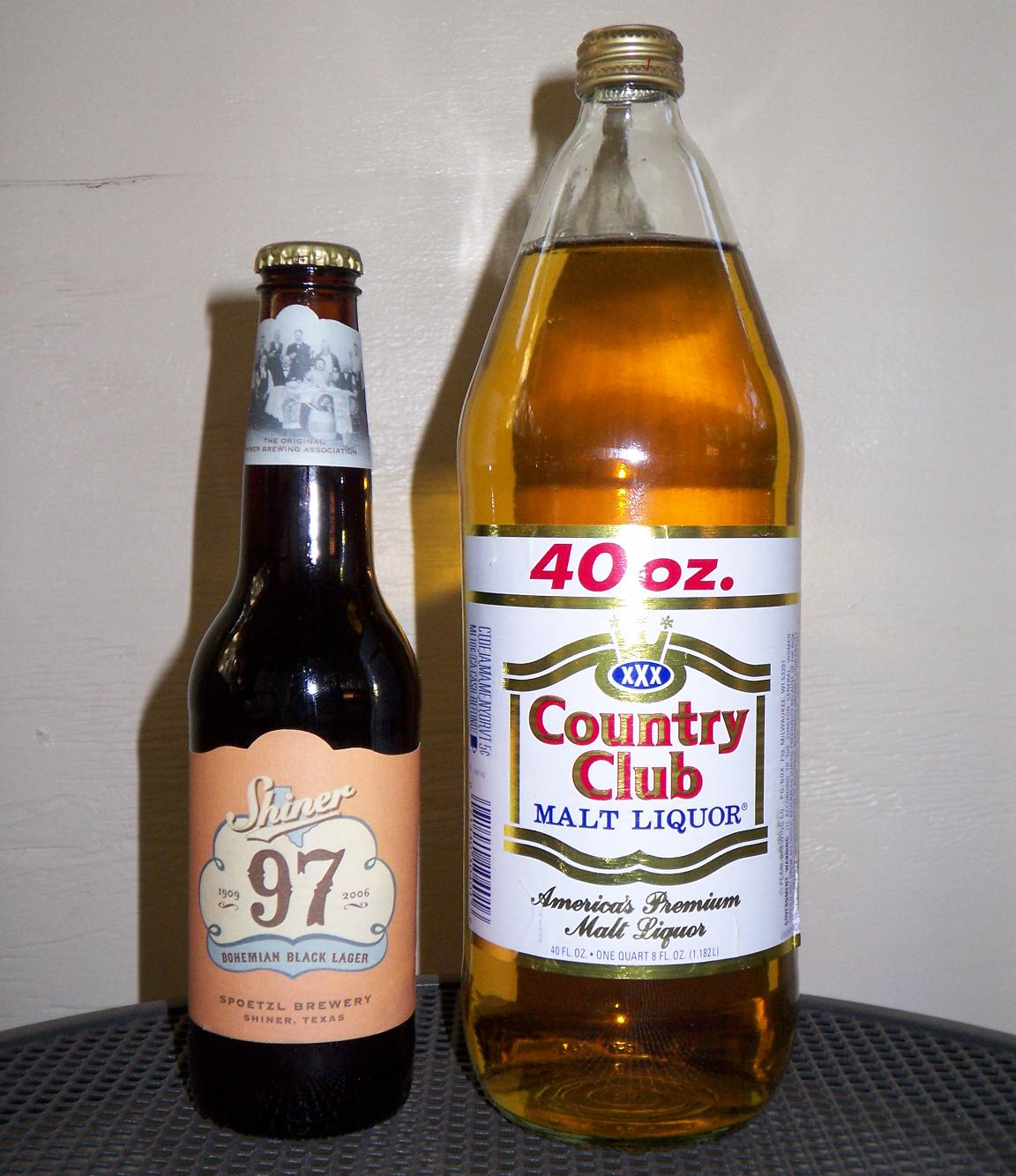
A 12 oz (355 mL) longneck beer bottle (left) and a 40 oz (1183 mL) bottle of malt liquor

In the United States of America and Canada, malt liquor is a type of mass market beer with high alcohol content (typically above 5%), made with malted barley and resembling American-style lagers.

== Manufacture ==
Malt liquor is a strong lager or ale in which sugar, corn or other adjuncts are added to the malted barley to boost the total amount of fermentable sugars in the wort. This increases the final alcohol concentration without creating a heavier or sweeter taste. Additionally, it is less bitter due to the lower quantity of hops used.

== Brewing and legal definitions ==
Malt liquor is typically straw to pale amber in color. While traditional premium lager is made primarily from barley, water, and hops, malt liquors tend to make much greater use of inexpensive adjuncts such as corn, rice, or dextrose. Use of these adjuncts, along with the addition of special enzymes, results in a higher percentage of alcohol than an average beer. Higher-alcohol versions, sometimes called "high-gravity" or just "HG", may contain high levels of fusel alcohols, which give off solvent- or fuel-like aromas and flavors.

Malt liquor is a type of beer that after brewing results in a higher percentage of alcohol than lagers without additional sugars or adjuncts. It originated in Europe, where it was first made with malted barley. Malt liquor became popular in the United States during the Prohibition era when many people turned to making their alcoholic beverages at home.

Today, malt liquor is typically made with a combination of grains, including wheat, rye, and corn. It is often bottled or canned and has a higher alcohol content than most beer. Some brands of malt liquor are also available in barrels. While ordinary beer in the United States averages around 4-5% alcohol by volume, malt liquors typically range from 6% up to 9% alcohol by volume. A typical legal definition is Colorado's Rev. Stat. ss. 12-47-103(19), which provides that:

"Malt Liquors" includes beer and shall be construed to mean any beverage obtained by the alcoholic fermentation of any infusion or decoction of barley, malt, hops or any other similar products, or any combination thereof, in water containing more than three and one fifth percent of alcohol by weight.

Alcohol percentages measured by weight translate into larger figures when re-expressed as alcohol percentages by volume, because ethanol is less dense than water.

== History ==
The term "malt liquor" is documented in England in 1690 as a general term encompassing both beer and ale. The first mention of the term in North America appears in a patent issued by the Canadian government on July 6, 1842, to one G. Riley for "an improved method of brewing ale, beer, porter, and other maltliquors."

The Clix brand is often credited as the first malt liquor made in the United States, granted a patent in 1948. The first widely successful malt liquor brand in America was Country Club, which was produced in the early 1950s by the M. K. Goetz Brewing Company in St. Joseph, Missouri.

Popular brands include Colt 45, St. Ides, Mickey's, Steel Reserve, King Cobra, Olde English 800, Country Club, Magnum, Schlitz Bull, Private Stock, Earthquake, Camo, Hurricane, Natty Daddy, and Icehouse Edge.

== Advertising ==
The core market for malt liquor brewers in the United States in the late 20th and early 21st centuries has been the Black and Hispanic populations. Brewers' use of target marketing in advertising malt liquor primarily to young, inner-city, black males has been controversial, because of the drink's higher alcohol content and the perceived vulnerability of the target audience. Brewers and advertisers have stated that they simply advertise to those who already buy their products. Critics have objected to the targeting of a segment of the population suffering disproportionately from alcohol-related diseases and poor access to medical care.

In order to highlight the potency of malt liquor, brand names have stressed powerful imagery such as Colt 45 (a reference to the .45 Colt handgun cartridge), Big Bear, and Power Master, and used slogans such as "It's got more" or "The Real Power". Power and sexual dominance have been common themes in their advertising. Latter-20th-century television commercials for Schlitz Malt Liquor featured an 1800-lb. Brahma bull charging through walls. Ads for Power Master, and the brand name itself, were eventually banned in the United States by regulations against advertising implying the strength of alcoholic beverages.

=== Health concerns ===
The National Institute on Alcohol Abuse and Alcoholism (NIAAA) has reported that African Americans suffer disproportionate rates of cirrhosis of the liver and other alcohol-related health problems. In light of such statistics, African-American community leaders and some health officials have concluded that targeting high-alcohol beverage ads at this segment of the population is unethical and socially irresponsible. In 1991, U.S. Surgeon General Antonia Novello criticized all alcoholic beverage companies for "unabashedly targeting teenagers" with "sexual imagery, cartoons, and rock and rap music" in television and print ads.

== Container size ==
In the American vernacular, a forty-ounce or simply a forty is a glass or plastic bottle that holds 40 US fluid ounces (1,200 millilitres; 2 1/2 US pints) of malt liquor. Malt liquors are commonly sold in 40–fluid ounce bottles, as opposed to the standard 12-US-fluid-ounce (350 mL; 3/4 US pt) bottle that contains a single serving of beer.

After the introduction of 40-ounce containers, which contain roughly five standard drinks, "Forties" became a favorite high of many youth in inner-city areas. They have often been mentioned and endorsed by rap stars as well as by punk bands, as in such songs as "40.oz Casualty" by The Casualties, "Rock the 40. Oz." by Leftöver Crack, and "40oz. to Freedom" by Sublime.

Examples of malt liquors sold in forty-ounce bottles include Olde English 800, Colt 45, Mickey's, Camo 40, Earthquake, Black Fist, Country Club, Black Bull, Labatt Blue Dry 6.1/7.1/8.1/9.1/10.1, Labatt Max Ice, WildCat, Molson Dry 6.5/7.5/8.5/10.1, Molson XXX, Private Stock, Big Bear, St. Ides, Steel Reserve 211, B40 Bull Max, King Cobra, and Hurricane. Dogfish Head Brewery has sporadically produced a high-end bottle-conditioned forty called "Liquor de Malt".

At least for a brief period in the mid-1990s, some brands of malt liquor, including Olde English 800, Colt 45, and Mickey's, were available in even larger, 64-ounce glass bottles. Forty-ounce bottles are not permitted in some U.S. states, including Florida, where the largest permissible container of retail malt beverage is 32 US fluid ounces (950 ml).

== See also ==
- Flavored fortified wines
- Barley wine
- Barley water
