= Steel Reserve =

American lager brand

- Manufacturer: Molson Coors
- Introduced: 1994
- Alcohol by volume: 6.0-8.1
- Style: Malt liquor

Steel Reserve, also known as 211, is an American lager brand owned and produced by Steel Brewing Company, which is owned by Miller, a subsidiary of Molson Coors. The drink comes in "Black" and "Silver" varieties, also known as "Triple Export Malt Liquor" and "High Gravity Lager", respectively. It has a high alcohol content (typically 8.1% ABV). It was introduced in 1994.

== General ==
Steel Reserve is sold in 42 US fl oz (1.2 L) bottles. It also is distributed in 24 US fl oz (710 mL) cans, 22 US fl oz (650 mL) bottles, 16 US fl oz (470 mL) cans in packs of four or six, and 12 US fl oz (350 mL) cans in packs of six or twelve. In 2016 the company replaced its 40 oz. narrow-neck glass bottles with 42 oz. wide-neck, shatterproof plastic bottles.

== Availability ==
The 40-ounce, 8.1% ABV variety is widely available throughout the US; however, some states require the beverage to be sold as a diluted 6.0% ABV and in Utah 4.0% ABV within accordance of state law.

== Awards and ratings ==
In 2012, Steel Reserve 8.1% ABV received the gold medal in the category of 'American-Style Premium Lager or Specialty Lager' at the World Beer Cup. Additionally, the American malt liquor style ale has been rated within the 83 percentile earning the good rating by Beeradvocate, while users of the site have accumulated a rating of 60 - poor (2017). Alternatively, Ratebeer has given an accumulative rating of 0 overall and 10 for overall style.

== Competitor response ==
Anheuser-Busch also adopted the "High Gravity" nomenclature, referring to the term specific gravity, a measurement used to quantify the sugars available to produce alcohol in a fermented beverage, which may give an indication of alcohol content, and released Hurricane High Gravity Lager with the same alcohol content, container sizes, and similar price.

== Advertising ==
Reverend Horton Heat and the Ramones were commissioned to release several radio jingles for the beverage in the 1990s. In Evicted: Poverty and Profit in the American City, Steel Reserve is referred to as "crack in a can" in Chapter 10.
