= Henry Weinhard =

Oregon brewer

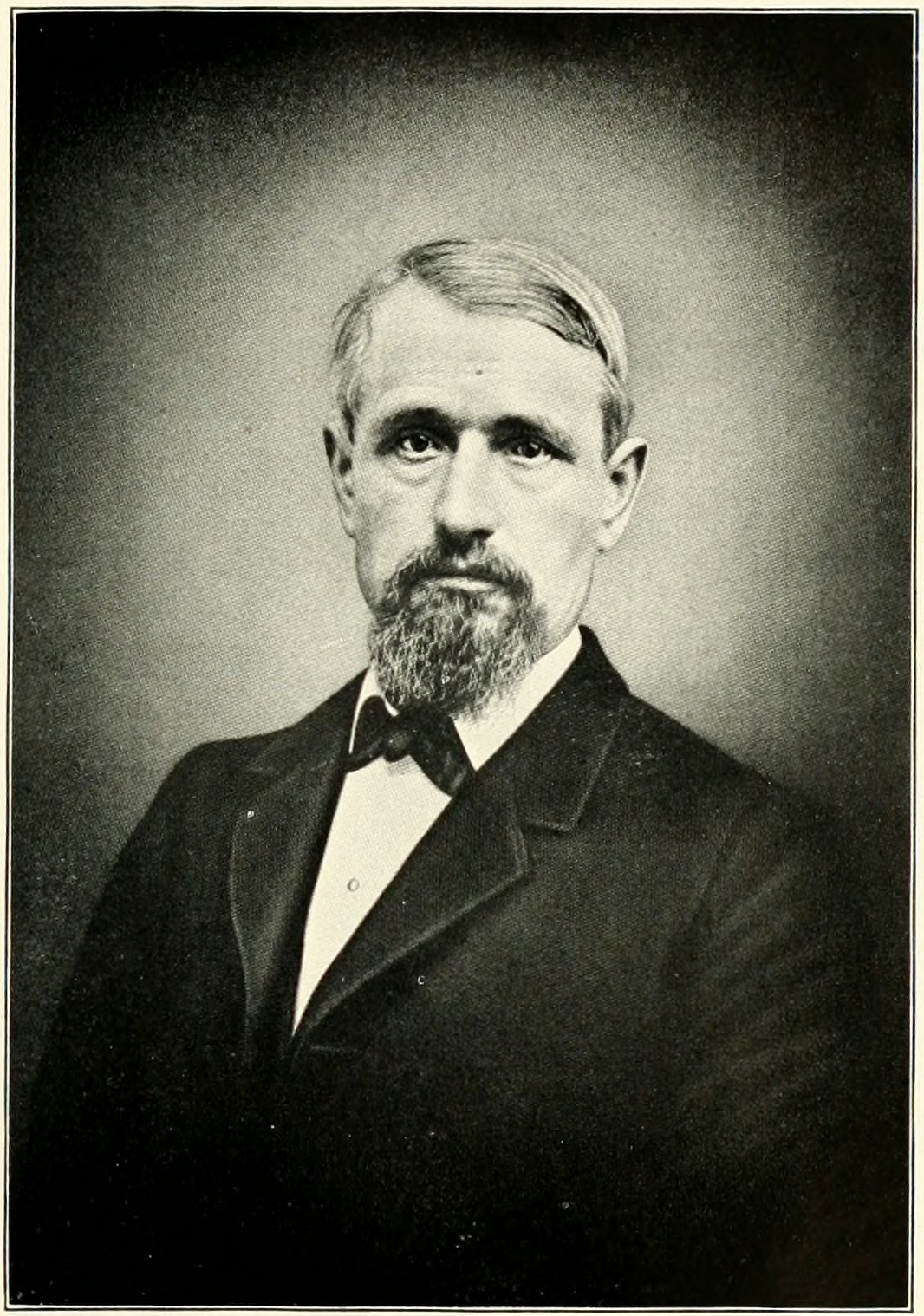
- Born: February 18, 1830; Kingdom of Württemberg
- Died: September 20, 1904 (aged 74); Portland, Oregon, U.S.
- Resting place: River View Cemetery, Portland, Oregon, U.S.
- Occupations: Brewer, businessman founder of Henry Weinhard's
- Spouse: Louisa Wagenblast
- Children: 2 daughters

Henry Weinhard (February 18, 1830 – September 20, 1904) was a German-American brewer in Portland, Oregon. After immigrating to the United States in 1851, he lived in Philadelphia, Cincinnati, St. Louis, and Sacramento before settling in the Portland area. Weinhard worked for others in the beer business before buying his own brewery and founded Henry Weinhard's and built its brewery complex in downtown Portland.

== Early life ==
Born in the Kingdom of Württemberg (now part of Baden-Württemberg in southwest Germany), Weinhard was raised in Lindenbronn, and later moved to nearby Stuttgart, where he was an apprentice in the brewing trade. In 1851, he immigrated to the United States, landing in New York City. Weinhard moved to Philadelphia where he worked for a year in the brewing business before moving west to Cincinnati, Ohio. After two years there, he moved southwest to St. Louis, Missouri, where he stayed until 1856. During this time in America, he worked as a brewer for others while preparing his own beer recipes.

== Oregon ==
In 1856, Weinhard moved to California and settled briefly, in Sacramento next year in March, he relocated to Vancouver in the Washington Territory, where he began working at a brewery owned by John Meunich; and, helped him construct a new brewery. Weinhard worked there for six months, and; then, founded a brewery with George Bottler, across the Columbia River in Portland, Oregon. This partnership did not last long and he sold out to Bottler and returned to working for Meunich. Weinhard bought Meunich's business in 1859 and named it the Vancouver Brewery.

In 1862, Weinhard bought the Henry Saxer Brewery in Portland and then partnered with Bottler again to build a new brewery in today's Northwest Portland. That year he also moved permanently to Portland; he sold his Vancouver operations in 1864 and bought out Bottler of his share of the business in 1866. Weinhard also bought Portland's oldest brewery, the Liberty Brewery, and continued expansion of the Portland operations, then called the City Brewery. By 1890, the brewery was the largest in the Pacific Northwest and had grown from producing 2,000 barrels per year to 40,000 barrels that year.

== Later years and family ==
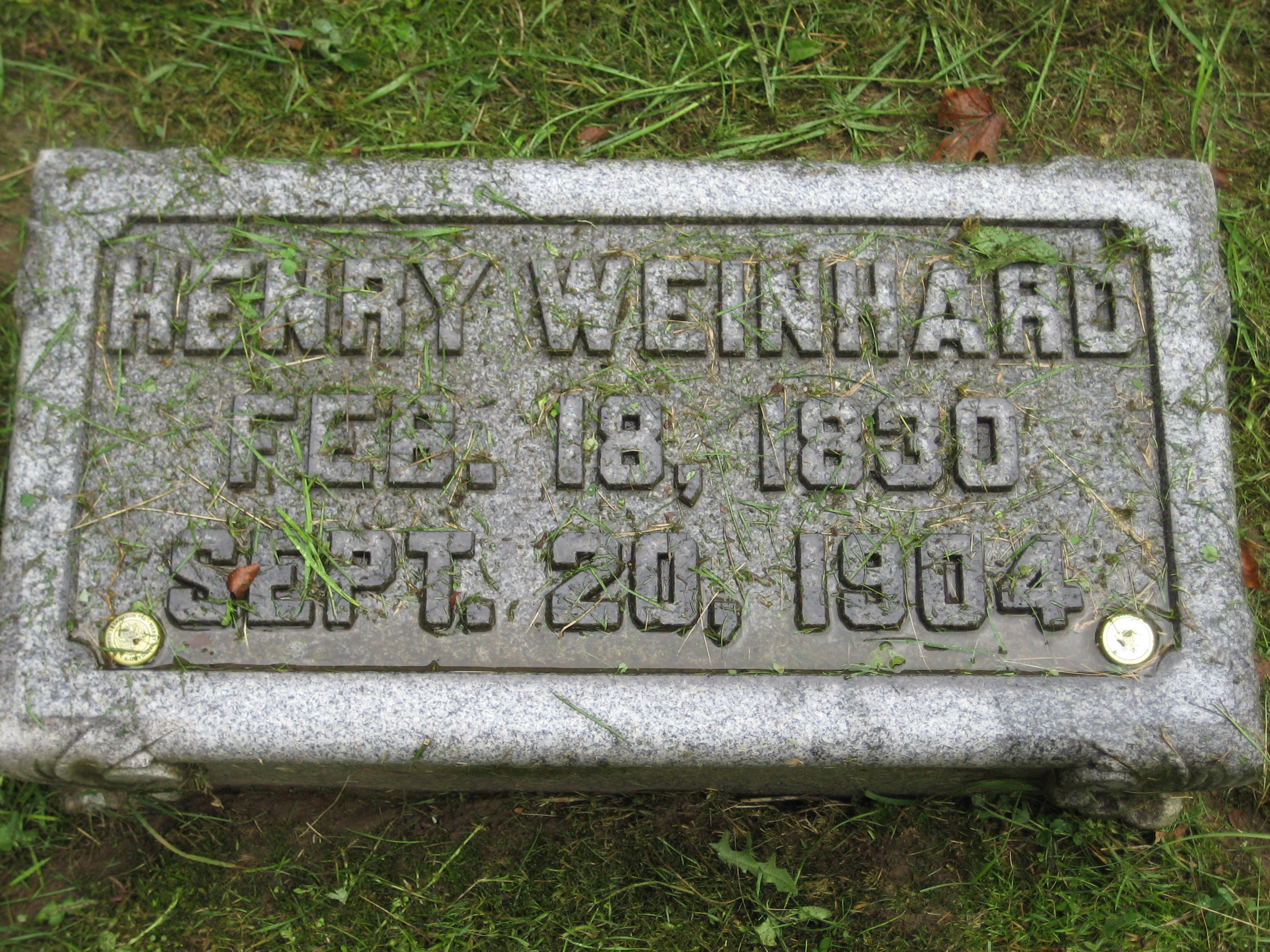
Weinhard's grave marker with bottle caps

In 1859, Weinhard married Louisa Wagenblast, and they had five children; only two survived to adulthood. A Mason, he was also a member of several German societies in Portland. This included helping to found the Portland German Aid Society, with other civic activities including providing funds to build a church adjacent to the brewery. Other business interests outside of the brewery included stakes in the Portland Hotel, the West Side Railway, and the New Grand Central Hotel. In 1887, Weinhard offered to pump free beer into the Skidmore Fountain for its dedication; the city declined the offer due to the fear of rowdy horses.

== Death ==
Weinhard died in Portland at age 74 and was buried in its River View Cemetery. The brewery he built remained in operation for another 95 years, until 1999.
