= List of caffeinated alcoholic drinks =

This is a list of caffeinated alcoholic drinks with at least 9 mg caffeine — a 2005 clinical trial showed psychoactive effects in caffeine doses as low as 9 mg.

Drink	Caffeine source	Caffeine (mg/drink)	Caffeine (mg/100 mL)	ABV	Recipe
Espresso martini	Espresso, Kahlúa	217 mg	164 mg	9.8%	1.5 oz espresso (212 mg caffeine), 10 mL sugar syrup, 30 mL Kahlúa (20% ABV. 1.5 oz Kahlúa contains 5 mg of caffeine)), 50 mL vodka (40%)
Caffè corretto	Espresso	212 mg	249 mg	20%	1.5 oz espresso (212 mg caffeine), 1.5 oz grappa (40%)
Carajillo	Coffee	212 mg	249 mg	20 %	1.5 oz espresso, liquor (various)
Buckfast Tonic Wine "brown bottle"	Caffeine	89 mg	60 mg	14.8%	60 mg caffeine per 100 mL. Fortified wine (14.8%). 1 wine glass (5 oz)
Vodka Red Bull	Red Bull	60 mg	20 mg	7.4%	A 250 mL can Red Bull (60 mg caffeine in average), 2 oz vodka (40%)
Irish coffee	Coffee	80 mg	48 mg	9.7%	8 cL (4 parts) hot coffee (average 80 mg caffeine), 3 cL (1 1/2 parts) fresh cream, 1 tsp (5 mL) brown sugar, 4 cL (2 parts) Irish whiskey (40% (legal definition))
Gunfire	Black tea	41 mg	35 mg	6%	1 cup (~240 mL) of black tea (mean 35 mg caffeine), 1 oz rum (40%)
Rev	Cola	38 mg	8 mg	7%	473 mL cola (37.84 mg caffeine: cola contains 8 mg/100 mL in average),
Twisted Tea	Tea	30 mg	7 mg	5%	12 oz. (355 ml) can; flavoured malt beverage brewed with tea
Jägerbomb	Caffeinated energy drink	29 mg	21 mg	3.5%	1/2 (125 mL) can energy drink (30 mg caffeine). 1/2 oz Jägermeister (35%)
Vodka Red Bull	red bull	26 mg	80 mg	20 %	red bull (250 mL can), vodka (60 mL)
Kahlúa	Arabian coffee	11 mg	5 mg	20%	20% ABV: arabica coffee (1.5 oz Kahlúa contains 5 mg of caffeine), sugar, rum
Rum and Coke	Cola	10 mg	6 mg	11.8%	120 mL cola (9.6 mg caffeine: cola contains 8 mg/100 mL in average), 50 mL rum (40%)
Calimocho	Cola	8 mg	4 mg	7 %	100 mL cola, 100 mL red wine
Black Russian (White Russian)	Kahlúa	3 mg	2 mg (1 mg)	32 % (24 %)	30 mL Kahlúa, 50 mL vodka, (additional 30 mL cream for white Russian)
Coffee liqueur	Coffee	various	various	various	various
Hard iced tea	Tea	various	various	various	various

Caffeinated alcoholic drinks

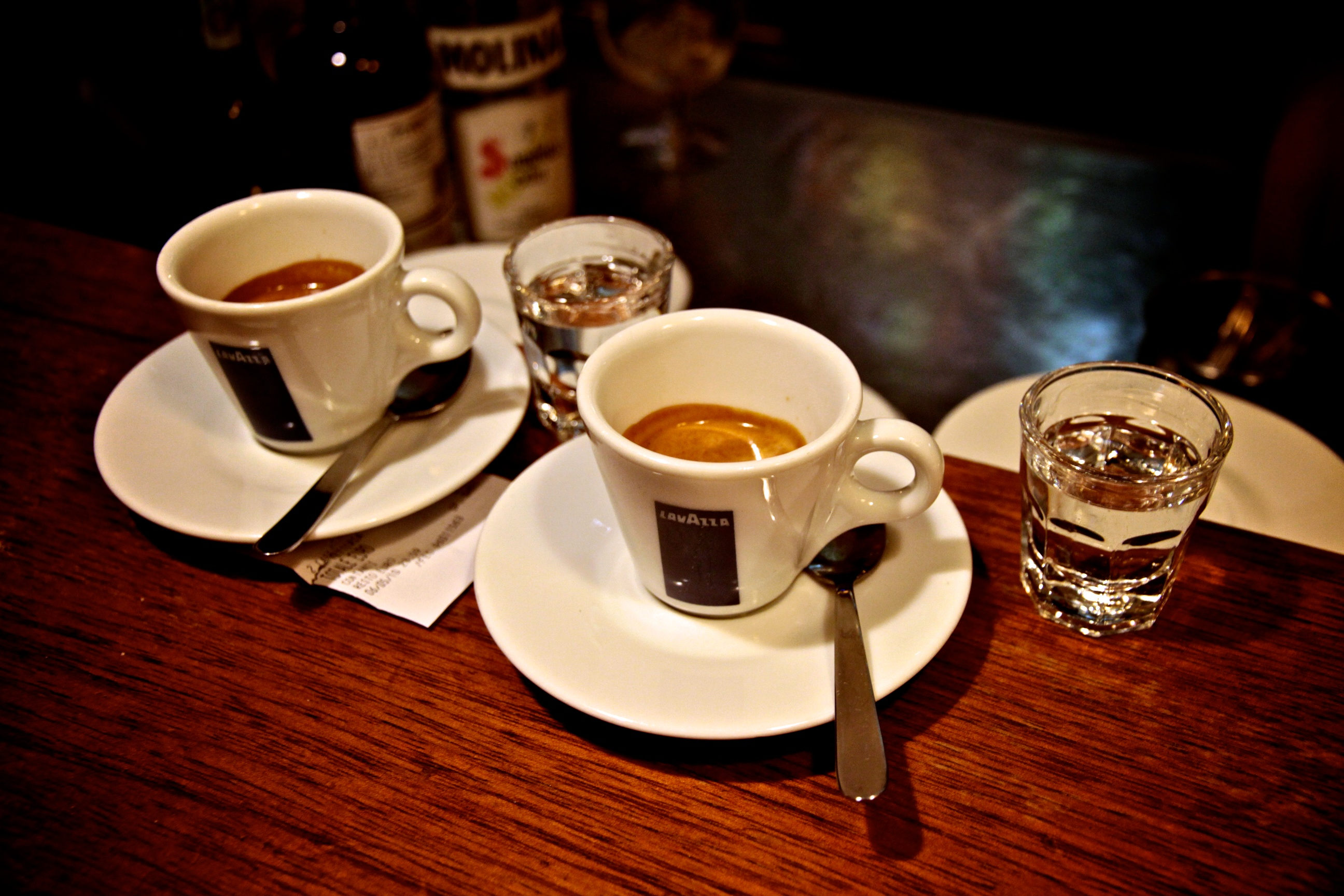
Caffè corretto

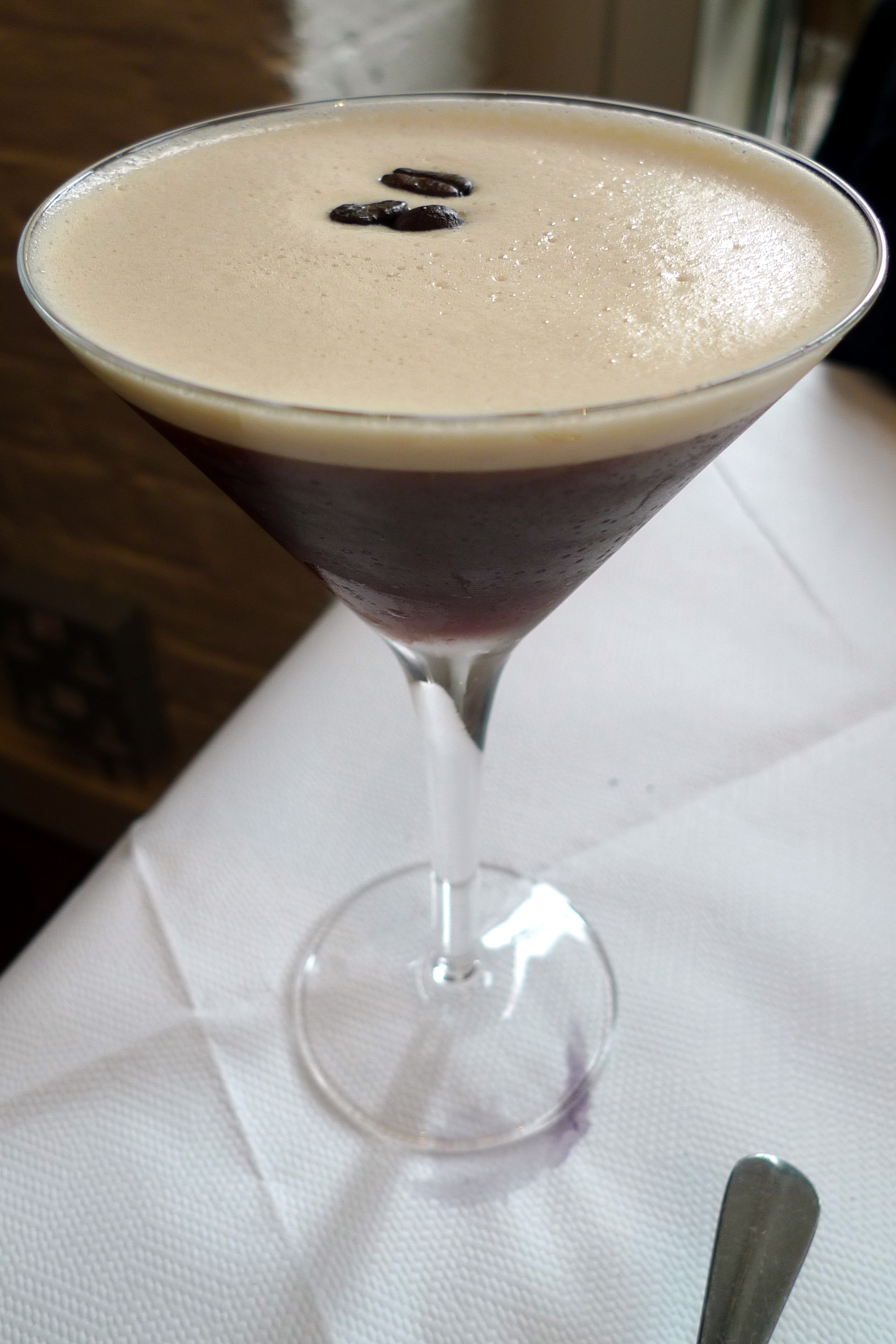
Espresso martini

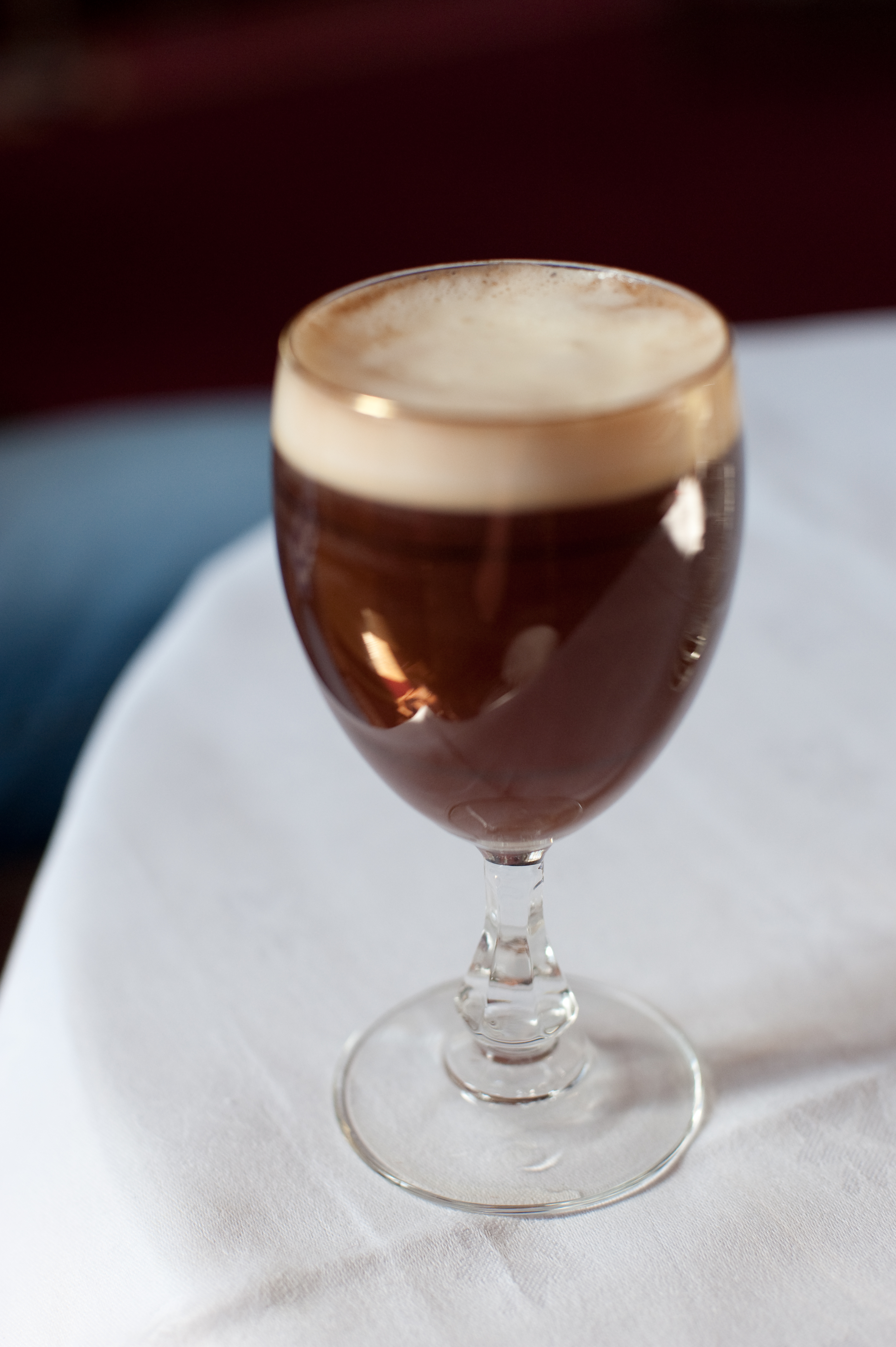
Irish coffee

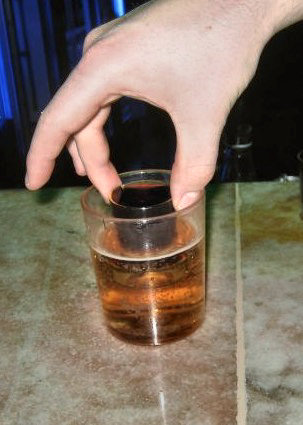
Jägerbomb

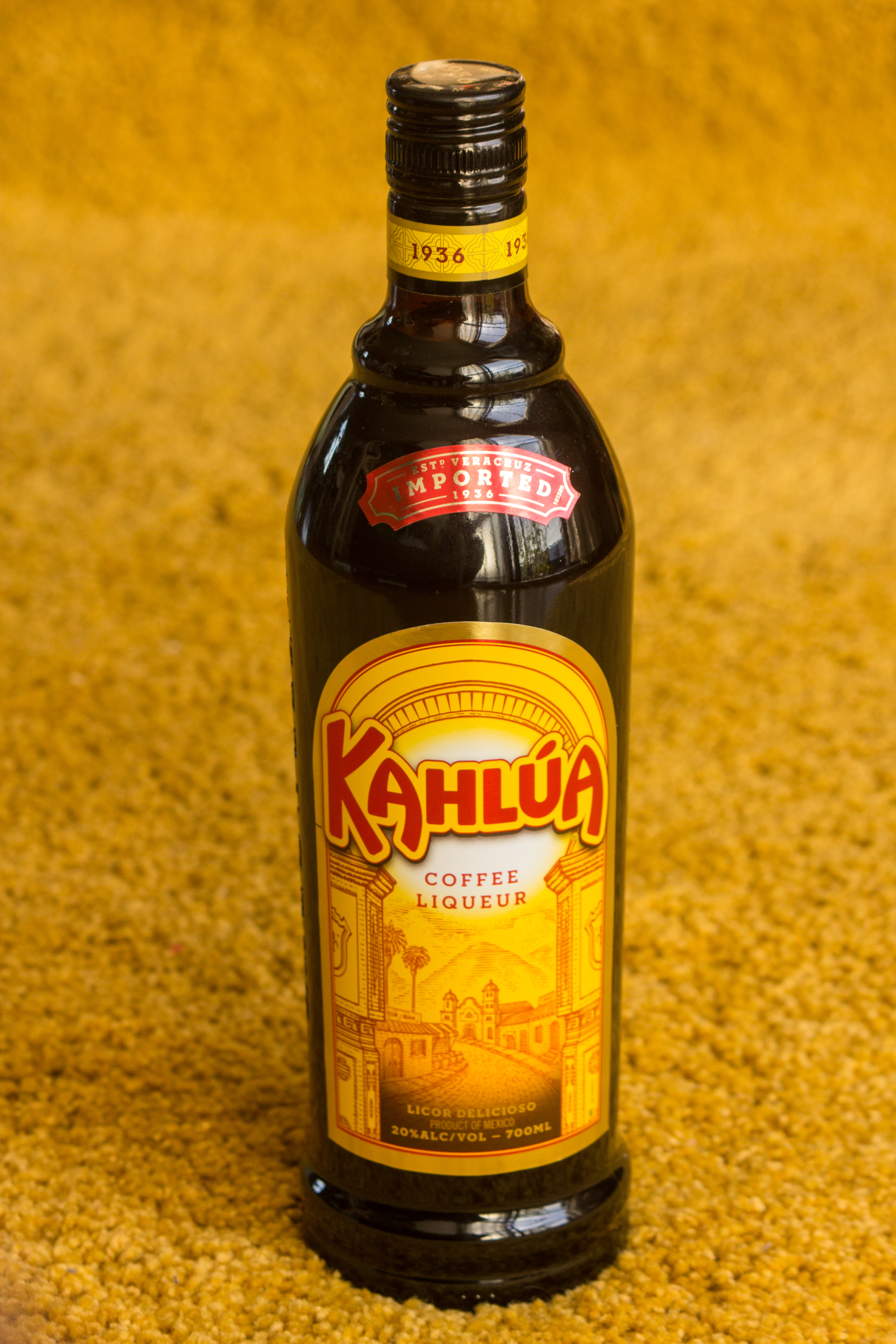
Kahlúa

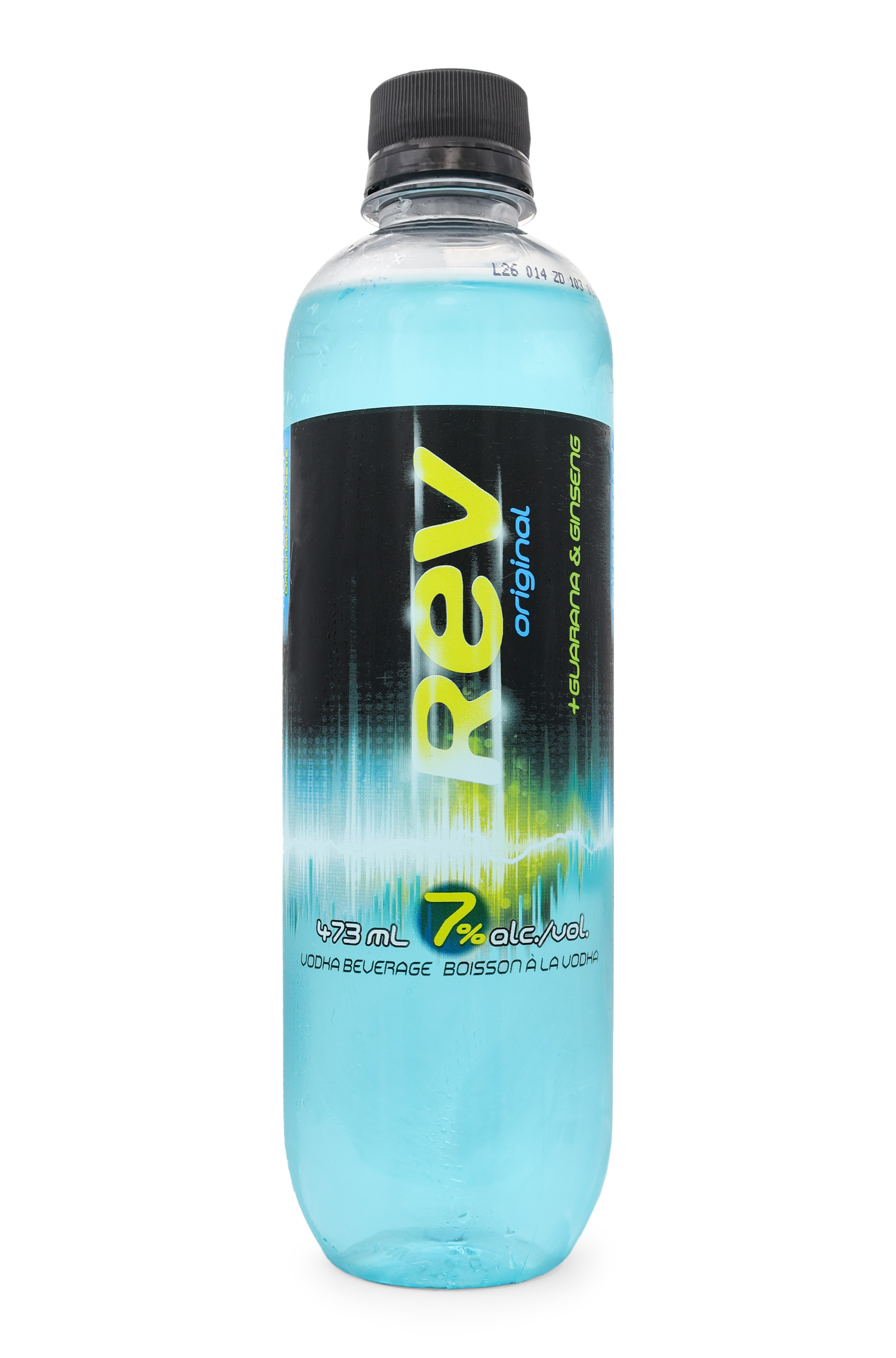
Rev

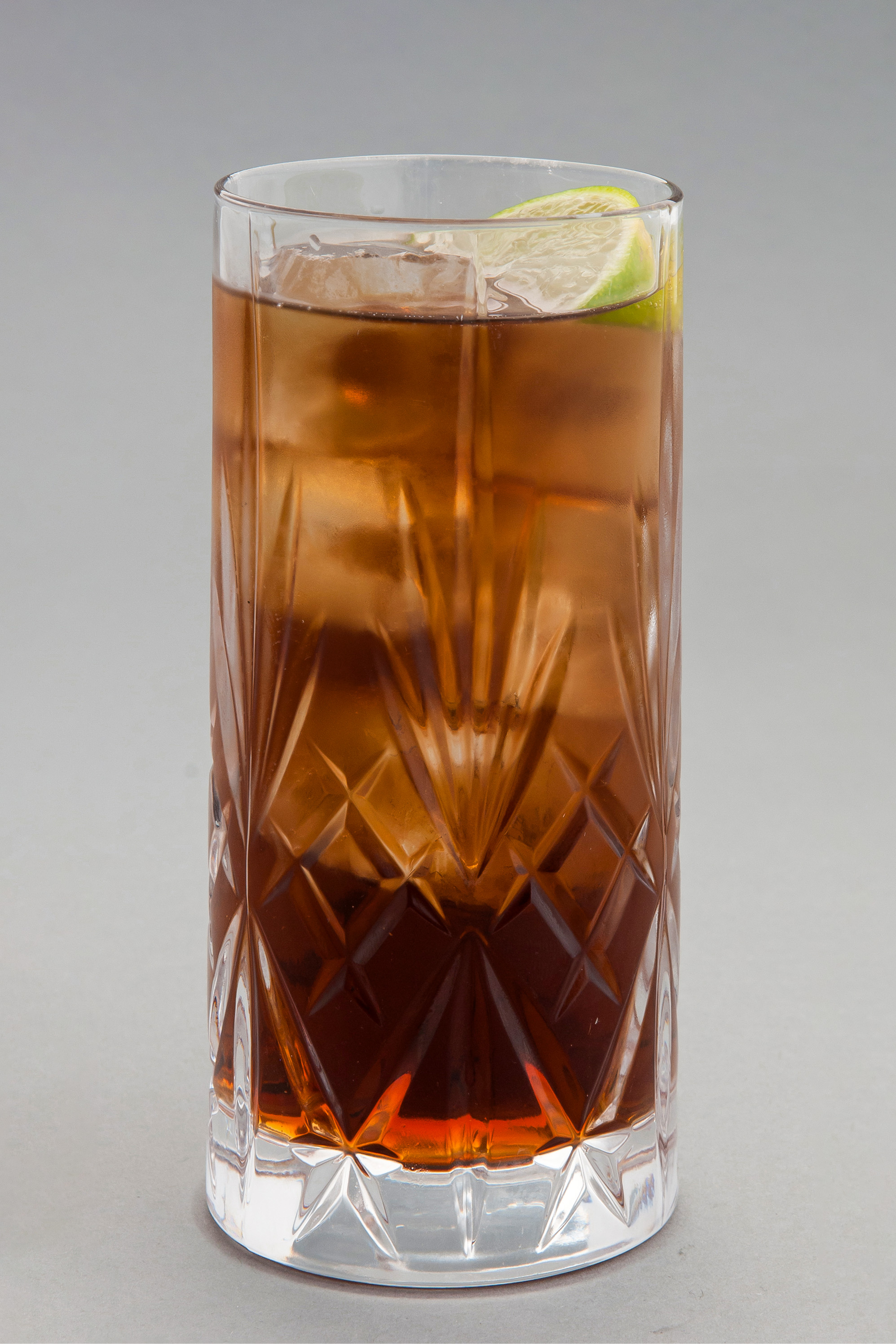
Rum and Coke

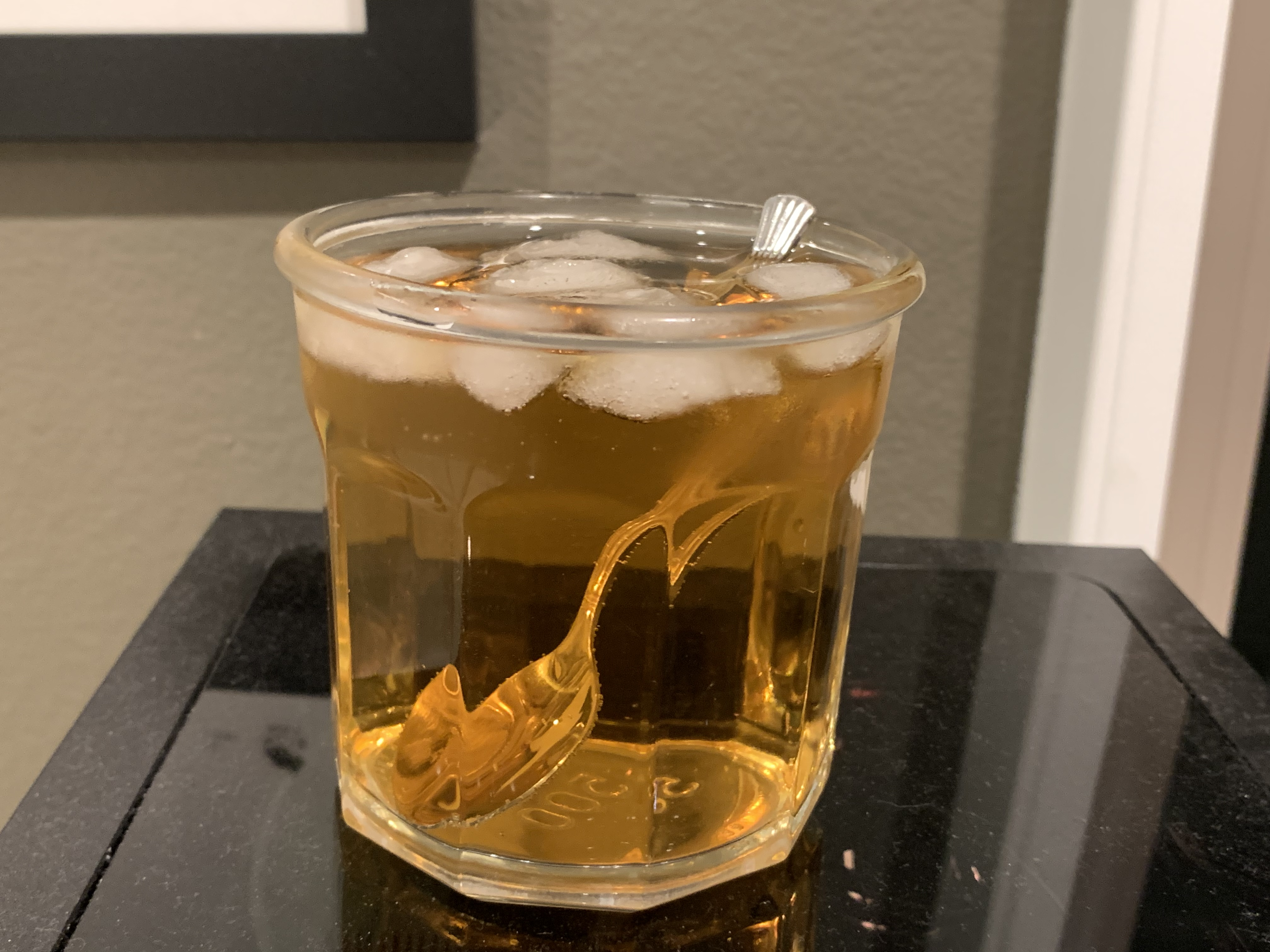
Vodka Red Bull

== See also ==
- Alcoholic drink
- Caffeinated drink
- Coca wine
- Nicotini
