= Alcohol myopia =

Theory about alcohol's effect on behavior

Alcohol myopia is a cognitive-physiological theory on alcohol use disorder in which many of alcohol's social and stress-reducing effects, which may underlie its addictive capacity, are explained as a consequence of alcohol's narrowing of perceptual and cognitive functioning. The alcohol myopia model posits that rather than disinhibit, alcohol produces a myopia effect that causes users to pay more attention to salient environmental cues and less attention to less salient cues. Therefore, alcohol's myopic effects cause intoxicated people to respond almost exclusively to their immediate environment. This "nearsightedness" limits their ability to consider future consequences of their actions as well as regulate their reactive impulses.

Alcohol's ability to alter behavior and decision-making stems from its impact on synaptic transmission at GABA receptors. Alcohol's effects on the synaptic level dampen the brain's processing ability and limit attentional capacity.

Overall, the alcohol myopia theory proposes that intoxicated individuals will act rashly and will choose overly simple solutions to complex problems.

== Three classes of myopia ==
Alcohol's myopic effects on the drinker's cognitive processes can be characterized into three classes: self-inflation, relief, and excess.

=== Self-inflation ===
Alcohol consumption alters the drinker's self-image by "enhancing feelings of self-appraisal and even narcissism". Alcohol inhibits sophisticated levels of mental processing that are necessary to recognize personal flaws. The 'tunnel vision' effect of alcohol myopia, which limits the attentional capacity of the drinker, causes individuals to focus on favorable and superficial characteristics of themselves. Overall, the self-inflating effect of alcohol can increase the drinker's self-confidence and therefore lead them to engage in activities or social situations that would normally make her or him nervous or uncomfortable when sober.

=== Relief ===
Alcohol can alleviate the drinker's feelings of stress or anxiety. Alcohol myopia limits those under the influence of alcohol to see the world through a nearsighted lens; in other words, consumption of alcohol will lead individuals to temporarily forget about previous worries or problems, for these feelings lay outside of the restricted set of immediate cues that the drinker can respond to. By depriving the individual of the attention capacity necessary to process undesirable thoughts, alcohol myopia can bring the drinker a sense of relief.

=== Excess ===
Alcohol exaggerates the drinker's perception of the world around them. The drinker's response to this exaggerated world manifests in erratic and dramatic behaviors. Under the influence of alcohol, individuals are incapable of sufficiently processing the long-term consequences of their actions; they will respond to immediate and salient cues in the moment. In this way, drunk individuals can be described as "slaves to the present moment".

Alcohol is believed to disinhibit urges normally considered socially unacceptable. The sober brain is able to utilize the frontal cortex to make executive decisions and restrain these impulses. However, the drunk brain is unable to regulate the urges for excessive behavior.

By leading the brain to overreact to present cues and disregard the implications of one's actions, alcohol often provokes aggressive behavior. Alcohol consumption can result in a "Jekyll and Hyde" effect in individuals who are typically amiable when sober but are perhaps predisposed to aggressive behavior. Additionally, alcohol has a dramatic connection to criminal behavior, rage, physical destruction, and sexual assault.

However, alcohol myopia's effects on excessive behavior do not incite aggression in all drinkers. In some intoxicated individuals, excess simply manifests itself in their becoming significantly more talkative, flirtatious, or adventurous. Additionally, in situations in which inhibitory cues are the most salient, the individual may behave in a more prudent or passive manner than they would when sober.

== Alcohol's effects on neurotransmission ==
Alcohol is classified as a sedative hypnotic drug. Alcohol produces a sedative effect by acting on receptors of the inhibitory neurotransmitter GABA. GABA receptors contain a binding site for the chemical, GABA, a chloride ion channel, and an additional binding site for alcohol molecules.

GABA produces its normal inhibitory effects on cell activity by reducing a neuron's firing rate. When a GABA molecule attaches to its binding site, it activates the receptor, resulting in an inflow of chloride ions. The increase in concentration of negative charge inside the cell hyperpolarizes the membrane. This hyperpolarization decreases the likelihood that the membrane will send an action potential to neighboring neurons; the difference of charge across the membrane has increased, while it would need to decrease in order to reach the threshold charge necessary to propagate an action potential.

Alcohol acts as a positive allosteric modulator and therefore amplifies the transmitter's inhibitory effects. When alcohol molecules bind to its site on the GABA receptor, they lengthen the time that the receptor's chloride ion pore remains open, resulting in an even greater hyperpolarization of the membrane. Additionally the binding of alcohol causes the GABA transmitter to bind to its receptors more frequently, and therefore augments the transmitter's ability to inhibit cell activity.

Overall, alcohol's interactions with GABA receptors decrease neuronal firing across the body and inhibit cortical activation. Behavioral changes associated with alcohol myopia stem from the inhibitory effects of this reduction of firing and activation.

== The inhibition conflict ==
One effect of alcohol myopia is that it amplifies rash responses in intoxicated individuals. Alcohol does not directly affect the emotions and actions of inebriated people, but does so indirectly via its involvement in the inhibition conflict.

Inhibition conflict is a cognitive function that arises in people and allows them to make decisions based on immediate stimuli and stimuli that require a higher level of processing. In sober individuals, situations that produce an inhibition conflict would consist of one set of salient cues (external stimuli) that stimulate a certain response and other cues (internal stimuli such as possible negative consequences or societal standards and norms) that would inhibit the salient cues and therefore prevent rash action. Those influenced by alcohol myopia are unable to comprehend this second set of cues, as the condition narrows an individual's ability for higher-level cognitive functioning. Therefore, these individuals tend to act rashly without consideration for the consequences of their actions.

Studies have been conducted to test the effects of alcohol on the intensity of males' aggressive response to external stimuli, demonstrating the role of inhibition conflict on alcohol myopia. Male subjects under the influence of alcohol often ignored external cues, both in laboratory settings and in real life situations. In the lab patients who were given alcohol were more likely to respond to unpleasant tones (external stimuli) violently, despite internal cues advising them against aggression. Surveys conducted also demonstrated that while intoxicated men are more likely to address the salient cue of anger with aggressive behavior towards their partners. The results of these studies demonstrate men experiencing the effects of alcohol myopia were unable to process the consequences of their actions, and continued to act aggressively despite consequences. Alcohol had effectively limited their interpretation of salient cues and prevented them from interpreting cues that would inhibit aggressive action.

Women have also exhibited the effects of alcohol myopia's ability to disrupt the inhibition conflict. Research conducted in 2002 determined that there was a positive relationship between college females' level of sobriety and their decisions to engage in risky sexual behavior. Results showed that a majority of college aged females who had been drinking chose not to address risk topics before sexual intercourse with a partner. Alcohol myopia can explain this relationship. The inebriated females' abilities to analyze internal cues warning them of the risks of sex were inhibited by alcohol, while alcohol caused them to become more responsive to the salient cue of arousal.

== Risky behavior ==
Alcohol myopia has been shown to increase the likelihood that a person will engage in risky behavior. The increased risk taking brought on by alcohol myopia often ends with aversive consequences for the person acting dangerously or those influenced by the intoxicated's actions. Those under the influence of alcohol myopia are often unaware of the consequences of their behavior as well as its risky nature. It has been shown that alcohol myopia causes people to function like those with maladaptive risky behaviors, often caused by behavior disorders or a personal history of substance use. Dosage of alcohol intensifies these effects of myopia.

People under the influence of alcohol myopia act in a risky manner because of the myopia's inhibiting effects on their ability to analyze the probable outcomes of their actions. Alcohol activates dopaminergic circuits in the midbrain that also regulate the brain's analyzation and recognition of the outcomes of an action. It is not yet clear on exactly how alcohol effects these dopaminergic circuits. The following behaviors are influenced by risk taking when a person is experiencing the effects of alcohol myopia.

=== Personal goals ===
Alcohol myopia has also been found to affect one's level of commitment to a personal goal. Individual commitment to a goal is dependent upon level of personal desire and feasibility of the goal. A person's ability to appropriately interpret feasibility is inhibited by alcohol myopia. This is because desire is a more salient stimulus than feasibility, causing those experiencing alcohol myopia to ignore the less salient stimulant of feasibility. Because one is less inhibited by the prospect of unfeasible goals, those under the influences of alcohol myopia tend to feel more committed to their goals than sober individuals. Studies testing the relationship between intoxication and level of commitment to goals support the theory that increased goal commitment (despite level of feasibility) is a side effect of alcohol myopia.

=== Sexual arousal ===
Alcohol myopia causes individuals to become increasingly aware of sexual arousal and more likely to respond rashly to the arousal stimulus. The decision about how to respond to sexual arousal involves cognitive function that synthesizes both impelling cues (those that draw attention to the benefits of an action) and inhibiting cues (those that focus on the consequences of an action). The alcohol myopia theory suggests that intoxicated individuals will be more likely to engage in risky sexual behavior. Intoxicated males subject to high levels of sexual arousal were more likely to engage in unprotected sex than sober males subject to the same levels of arousal. This is because the impelling cues (sexual arousal) are often more imminent than inhibitory cues (safety precautions), and those affected by alcohol myopia are limited to cognitive processing of the more immediate cues and often ignore the inhibitory cues.

The extent of alcohol myopia's effects on one's decisions about how to react to sexual arousal is dependent upon the level of confliction one feels. The more intense the personal conflict of whether or not to use a condom, the greater effect alcohol has on the final decision to engage in risky sexual behavior. Intoxicated males who had felt heavily conflicted about condom use were least likely to use a condom. Those intoxicated men who had been less conflicted about using a condom were more likely to engage in safe sex. Therefore, some intoxicated individuals can actually be less likely to engage in risky sexual behavior than their sober counterparts, given appropriate cues. The effects of alcohol myopia on response to sexual arousal also depend on the level of sexual arousal. When sexual arousal levels were high, a greater percentage of men reported not using a condom than when arousal levels were low. This goes back to the importance of saliency in alcohol myopia. The more salient the external cue (in this case, higher levels of sexual arousal were more salient than lower levels) the more likely it is for alcohol to inhibit the comprehension of the consequences of an action.

=== Drunk driving ===
The Alcohol Myopia Model proposes that intoxication increases the likelihood that an individual will decide to drive in an unsafe situation. The drinker is unable to properly weigh the future consequences of his or her decision to drive; "inhibitory cues that prohibit driving are less likely to be considered because they lack salience and immediacy." Meanwhile, the intoxicated individual responds to the immediate motivations to drive. For example, he will focus on the rewards of getting home quickly and not having to pay for a cab. Therefore, under the influence of alcohol, driving becomes the simplest and most compelling option. Studies show that when questioned, intoxicated individuals reported "greater intentions to drink and drive...and fewer moral obligations against drinking and driving" than they did when sober.

== See also ==
- "Beer goggles"
