= Fluid bonding =

Fluid bonding may refer to:

- A process in polymer science
- An agreement between partners in a relationship to practice unprotected sexual intercourse

wiktionary:fluid-bonded
