= VARB =

VARB may mean:

- a Vodka Red Bull
- a pseudonym of Canadian cartoonist Raoul Barré (1874-1932)
- a software package used to perform variable rules analysis
