= Rhythm (liqueur) =

- Type: Liqueur
- Manufacturer: RJS Spirits, LLC
- Origin: United States
- Introduced: 2008
- Discontinued: 2013
- Alcohol by volume: 35.0%
- Proof (US): 70
- Colour: Red
- Website: www.drinkrhythm.com

Rhythm was a citrus flavoured liqueur infused with caffeine, ginseng, damiana, taurine, Vitamin B6, Vitamin B12, guarana, and electrolytes made by RJS Spirits LLC, an American company based in Louisville, Kentucky.

== History ==
The idea for Rhythm was first developed by a local wine maker along with three University of Louisville graduate students in 2004. To create the actual product, the creators worked with drink development company Pro-Liquitech International.

As part of bringing the product to market, Rhythm was entered into a number of competitions. The first version of Rhythm business plan won a University of Louisville internal business plan competition, which qualified it to regional, national and eventually the international Moot Corp Global Business Plan Competition where Rhythm finished 11th out of 35 entries.

== Distribution and marketing ==
Until 2013, Rhythm was distributed for sale in the United States, Germany and the United Kingdom. As part of its marketing strategy, Rhythm was featured in a number of music videos by well-known artists, including Lil Jon and DJ Khaled.

In 2009, the U. S. Food and Drug Administration began its investigation into the safety of caffeinated alcoholic beverages, and in late 2010, the first two states, Michigan and Washington, issued a ban on caffeinated alcoholic beverages. Following these announcements, the Alcohol and Tobacco Tax and Trade Bureau revoked its approval of both the label and formulation for Rhythm. RJS Spirits continued operations until 2013.

== Awards ==
- Platinum Award, World Spirits Competition: Liqueurs & Aperitifs category

== See also ==
- List of liqueurs
