= T-Room =

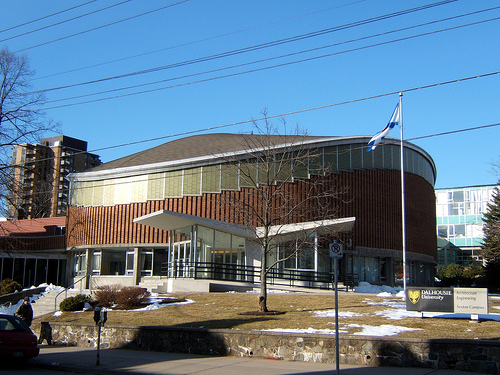
- The T-Room in Halifax, Nova Scotia
- Interactive map of T-Room

Restaurant information
- Established: 1937
- Owner: Dalhousie University
- Food type: BYOF
- Dress code: Casual
- Location: 1360 Barrington St., Halifax, Nova Scotia, Canada
- Coordinates: 44°38′35″N 63°34′19″W
- Website: https://dsu.ca/troom

The T-Room is a campus bar located in downtown Halifax, Nova Scotia, on Barrington Street between Spring Garden Road and Morris Street. It was opened in 1937 by Fredrick H. Sexton on the campus of the Nova Scotia Technical College, which is today the Sexton Campus of Dalhousie University. Dr. Sexton served as the first principal, and later president, of NSTC from 1907 to 1947.

== History ==
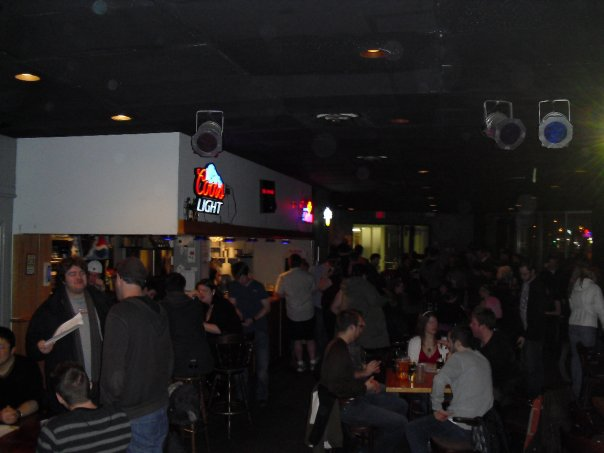
Inside the T-Room

From its inception the T-Room was a popular hang out for Engineering students, as well as those attending neighbouring Dalhousie University. Trivia nights, or Pub Quiz nights as they were then known, were a local favorite and still take place at the venue every Friday night to this day.

Circa 1980, NSTC became the Technical University of Nova Scotia (TUNS). The provincial government forced TUNS to amalgamate with Dalhousie University in April 1997. For several years the former TUNS faculties formed a college called Dalhousie University Polytechnic (nicknamed DalTech) but in 2001 the college structure was dissolved and the faculties simply became part of Dalhousie University.

Today, the TUNS campus is known as the Sexton Campus of Dalhousie University. It includes the T-Room, the Faculty of Engineering and the Faculty of Architecture and Planning. The TUNS School of Computer Science was merged with Dalhousie's after the 1997 amalgamation to become the Faculty of Computer Science. Computer Science moved into a new building on the Studley Campus in 1999.

It is commonly believed that the bar is named for its shape, but this is unlikely as it is actually closer in shape to a letter "L". It is more likely that the T-Room name came from students abbreviating the name Nova Scotia Technical College to "Tech" in conversation.

== Trivia nights ==
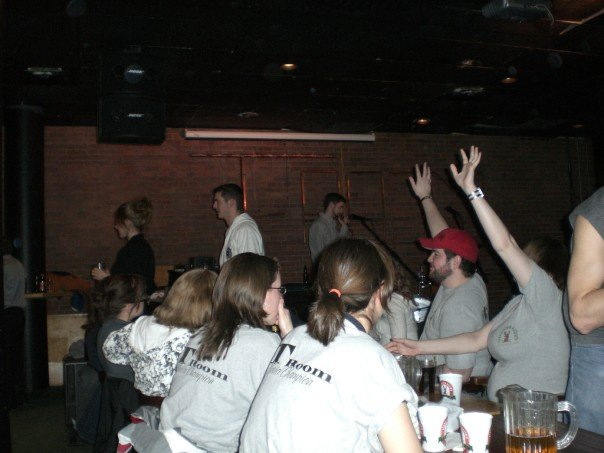
Friday night trivia at the T-Room.

Trivia at the T-Room originated every Friday starting in 2002. A student from PEI, where pub quizzes are very popular, spoke with the T-Room management and they agreed to start trivia to aid in Friday night sales. In 2004, due to the graduation of long-time trivia host Brent Desroches, trivia was handed off to a 3rd year student who had expressed interest. Brennan McVeigh hosted trivia during his time on campus. Because of the alternating schedule of co-op students a new host was required every four months. McVeigh would always return to host during his academic terms. In 2009, fans of trivia caused a public outcry when the weekly event was left off of a "Top Quiz and Trivia Nights" list published by local newspaper The Coast. Following this, The Coast published a second article mentioning the "renowned T-Room trivia" as well as its "die-hard fans", the T-Room Nation. The outcry also resulted in a brand new category for "Best Trivia Night" being added to the publication's annual "Best of Halifax Reader's Poll." This category has been won by the T-Room each year since its creation.

== The Rev-Bomb ==
In September 2009, in an effort to deplete their stock of Rev and harness the popularity of the Jägerbomb, the bar's liquor manager introduced the Rev-Bomb. This drink combines Rev and Jägermeister and quickly gained popularity. The drink soon earned the nickname the "Halifax Explosion" for its explosive rise in popularity and devastating taste.

== T-Room pool tournaments ==
On March 19, 2022, the first annual T-Room pool tournament took place at the bar across its two tables. The event was a celebration of the intense competition that regularly occurred at the back of the bar on the pool tables. The tournament used eight-ball rules and took place between 32 entrants in a single-elimination tournament where the semi-final, quarter-final and final frames required a best of three win to progress. The tournament was the idea of supervisor Bryn Taylor-Evans and designed and managed by head supervisor Gillian Stanton. Ultimately Taylor-Evans won the tournament before returning to his home country of Wales. Prizes for the winner and runner ups consisted of single beers up to a full 'bucket' (five beers on ice).

On 4 February 2023, a second tournament took place, with first place taken by student regular, Steve Newfie. Amongst the organisers, the tournament was jokingly referred to as the "Bryn Taylor-Evans Memorial Cup", mocking both Taylor-Evans as the first winner and the national championship of the Canadian Hockey League.
