= Espresso martini =

Coffee-flavored cocktail

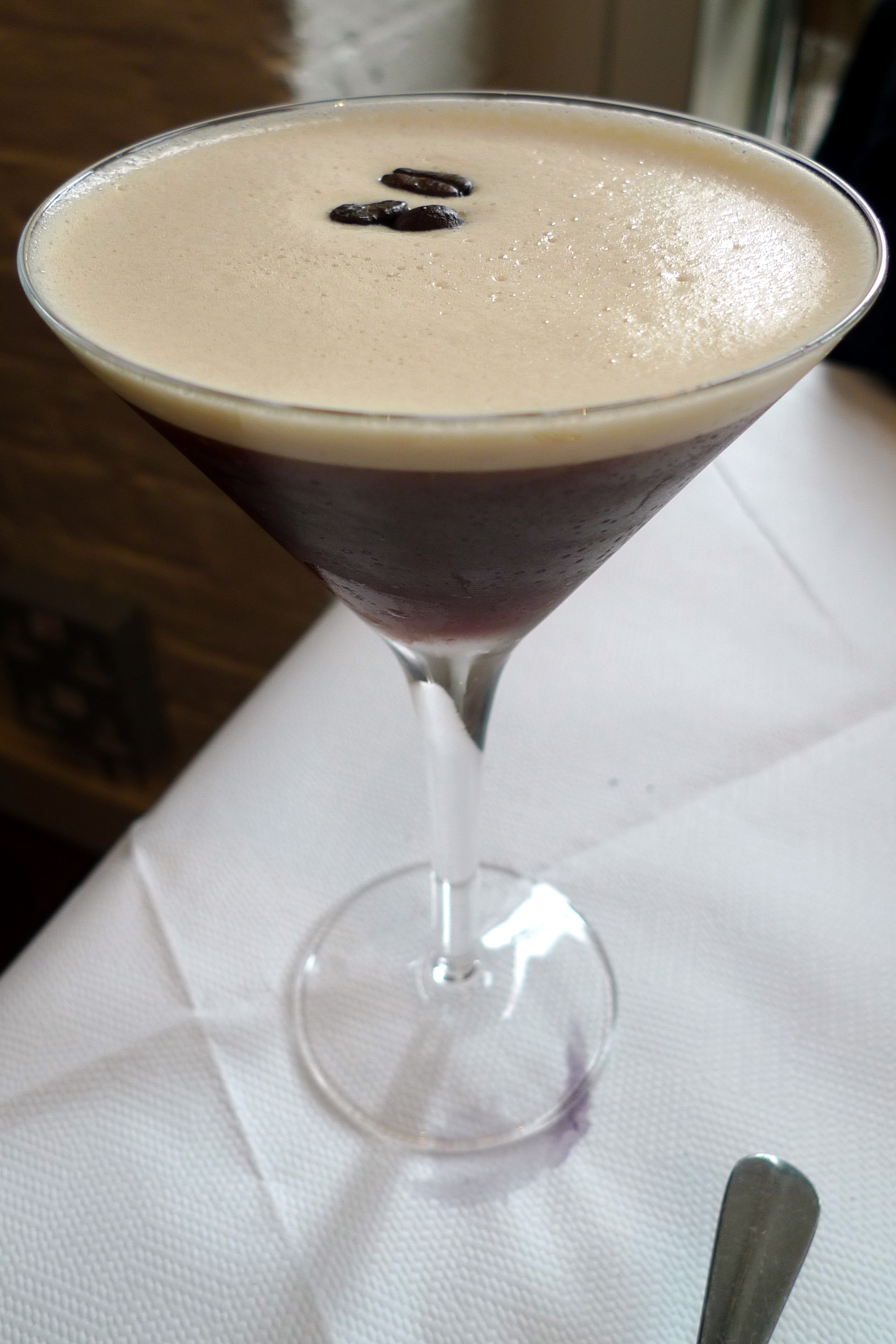
- Type: Cocktail
- Ingredients: 50 ml vodka; 30 ml Coffee Liqueur; 1 strong espresso
- Base spirit: Vodka
- Website: iba-world.com/iba-cocktail/espresso-martini/
- Standard drinkware: Cocktail glass
- Standard garnish: 3 coffee beans
- Served: Straight up: chilled, without ice
- Preparation: Pour all ingredients into cocktail shaker, shake well with ice, strain into chilled cocktail glass.

The espresso martini, also known as a vodka espresso, is a cold caffeinated alcoholic drink made with espresso, coffee liqueur, and vodka, served in a martini glass. It is not a true martini as it contains neither gin nor vermouth, but is one of many drinks that incorporate the term martini into their names.

== Origin ==
There are several claims for the origin of the espresso martini. One of the more common claims is that it was created by Dick Bradsell in the 1980s in London for a young woman who asked for "something to wake me up, then fuck me up". The bar where it was invented is identified as Soho Brasserie, which would date it as circa 1983, while Bradsell never identified the woman in question, only referring to her as a "top model" or an American model. The woman is rumored to be Marie Helvin, who was a noted American model in London at the time. Later claims that the woman was Naomi Campbell or Kate Moss are implausible, as they were too young at the time.

Bradsell has claimed to have invented it in a widely-circulated video. Bradsell has also been quoted about the circumstances of his invention of the drink, "The coffee machine at the Soho Brasseries was right next to the station where I served drinks. It was a nightmare, as there were coffee grounds everywhere, so coffee was very much on my mind. And it was all about vodka back then – it was all people were drinking."

== Recipes ==
The recipes for an espresso martini vary depending on the source. Traditionally, they include a type of coffee liqueur, with well known brands like Kahlúa or Tia Maria.

=== Difford's Guide ===
Difford's Guide recommends 1.5 US fluid ounces (44 mL) of vodka, 1 US fluid ounce (30 mL) of hot espresso coffee, and 2/3 US fluid ounce (20 mL) of coffee liqueur. The ingredients are poured into a shaker filled with ice. The mixture is then shaken, fine strained and poured into a chilled martini glass. The drink is garnished with coffee beans (and perhaps a twist of lemon zest) and served.

== Popularity ==
The drink had a surge in popularity in the early 2020s. This popularity was met with apprehension by bartenders due to the time and effort required to prepare the drink.

== Variants ==
There can be slight twists made to the classic espresso martini recipe. Examples include adding Cointreau and chocolate sauce to make a Chocolate Orange Espresso Martini, or adding marshmallow syrup to make a Toasted Marshmallow Espresso Martini.

== See also ==
- Freddo espresso
- Shakerato
