= Alcohol and sex =

Table from the 2010 DrugScience study ranking various drugs (legal and illegal) based on statements by drug-harm experts. This study rated alcohol the most harmful drug overall, and the only drug more harmful to others than to the users themselves.

Alcohol and sex deals with the effects of the consumption of alcohol on sexual behavior. The effects of alcohol are balanced between its suppressive effects on sexual physiology, which will decrease sexual activity, and its suppression of sexual inhibitions. A large portion of sexual assaults involve alcohol consumption by the perpetrator, victim, or both.

Alcohol is a depressant. After consumption, alcohol causes the body's systems to slow down. Often, feelings of drunkenness are associated with elation and happiness but other feelings of anger or depression can arise. Balance, judgment, and coordination are also negatively affected. One of the most significant short term side effects of alcohol is reduced inhibition. Reduced inhibitions can lead to an increase in sexual behavior.

== In men ==
Low to moderate alcohol consumption is shown to have a protective effect for men's erectile function. Several reviews and meta-analyses of existing literature show that low to moderate alcohol consumption significantly decreases erectile dysfunction risk.

Men's sexual behaviors can be affected dramatically by high alcohol consumption. Both chronic and acute alcohol consumption have been shown in most studies (but not all) to inhibit testosterone production in the testes. This is believed to be caused by the metabolism of alcohol reducing the NAD^{+}/NADH ratio both in the liver and the testes; since the synthesis of testosterone requires NAD^{+}, this tends to reduce testosterone production.

As testosterone is critical for libido and physical arousal, alcohol tends to have deleterious effects on male sexual performance. Studies have been conducted that indicate increasing levels of alcohol intoxication produce a significant degradation in male masturbatory effectiveness (MME). This degradation was measured by measuring blood alcohol concentration (BAC) and ejaculation latency. Alcohol intoxication can decrease sexual arousal, decrease pleasureability and intensity of orgasm, and increase difficulty in attaining orgasm.

== In women ==
In women, the effects of alcohol on libido in the literature are mixed. Some women report that alcohol increases sexual arousal and desire; however, some studies show alcohol lowers the physiological signs of arousal. A 2016 study found that alcohol negatively affected how positive the sexual experience was in both men and women. Studies have shown that acute alcohol consumption tends to cause increased levels of testosterone and estradiol. Since testosterone controls in part the strength of libido in women, this could be a physiological cause for an increased interest in sex. Also, because women have a higher percentage of body fat and less water in their bodies, alcohol can have a quicker, more severe impact. Women's bodies take longer to process alcohol; more precisely, a woman's body often takes one-third longer to eliminate the substance.

Sexual behavior in women under the influence of alcohol is also different from men. Studies have shown that increased BAC is associated with longer orgasmic latencies and decreased intensity of orgasm. Some women report a greater sexual arousal with increased alcohol consumption as well as increased sensations of pleasure during orgasm. Because ejaculatory response is visual and can more easily be measured in males, orgasmic response must be measured more intimately. In studies of the female orgasm under the influence of alcohol, orgasmic latencies were measured using a vaginal photoplethysmograph, which essentially measures vaginal blood volume.

Psychologically, alcohol has also played a role in sexual behavior. It has been reported that women who were intoxicated believed they were more sexually aroused than before consumption of alcohol. This psychological effect contrasts with the physiological effects measured, but refers back to the loss of inhibitions because of alcohol. Often, alcohol can influence the capacity for a woman to feel more relaxed and in turn, be more sexual. Alcohol may be considered by some women to be a sexual disinhibitor.

== Risky sexual behavior ==
Some studies have made a connection between hookup culture and substance use. Most students said that their hookups occurred after drinking alcohol. Frietas stated that in her study, the relationships between drinking and the party scene and between alcohol and hookup culture were "impossible to miss".

Studies suggest that the degree of alcoholic intoxication in young people directly correlates with the level of risky behavior, such as engaging in multiple sex partners.

In 2018, the first study of its kind, found that alcohol and caffeinated energy drinks is linked with casual, risky sex among college-age adults.

=== Sexually transmitted infections and unintended pregnancy ===
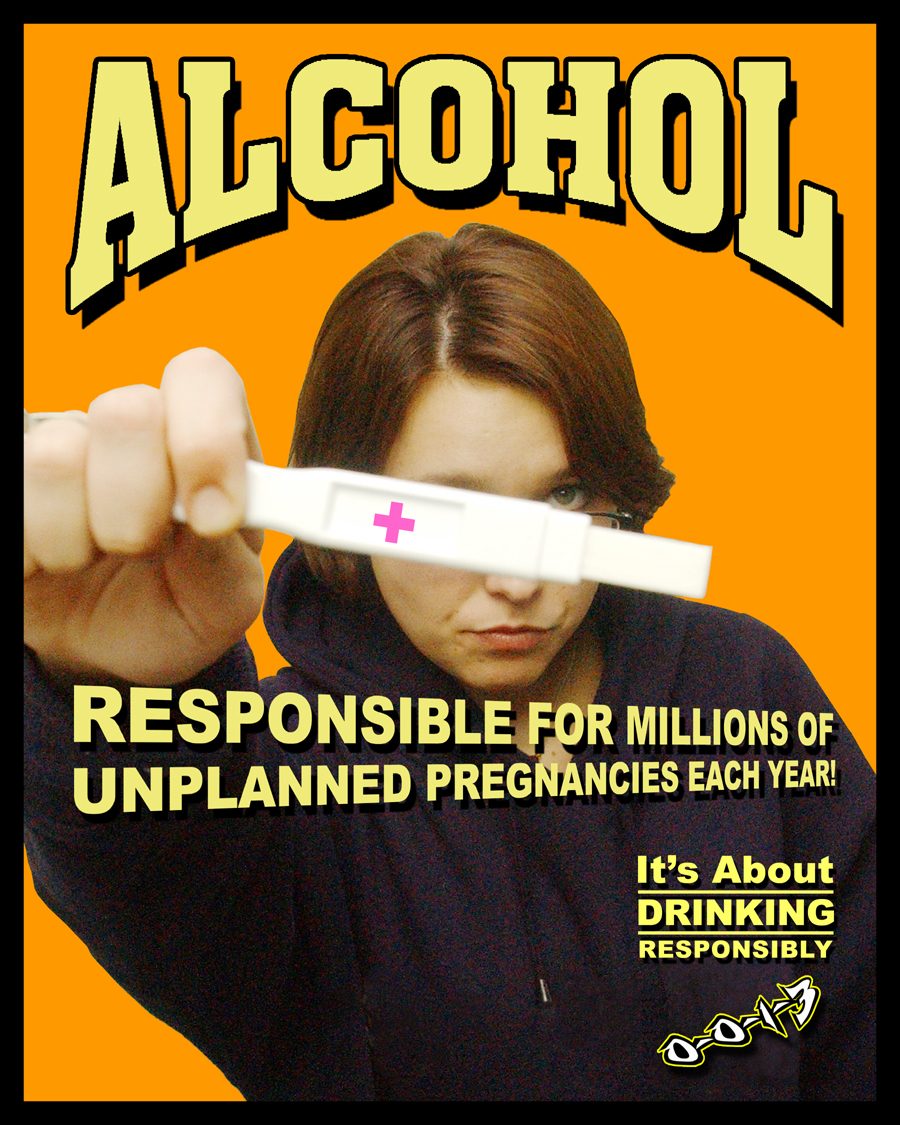
A 0-0-1-3 media campaign poster specifically highlighting that responsible alcohol use may prevent risky sexual behavior that often results in unplanned pregnancy

Alcohol intoxication is associated with an increased risk that people will become involved in risky sexual behaviors, such as unprotected sex. Both men, and women, reported higher intentions to avoid using a condom when they were intoxicated by alcohol.

Coitus interruptus, also known as withdrawal, pulling out or the pull-out method, is a method of birth control during penetrative sexual intercourse, whereby the penis is withdrawn from a vagina or anus prior to ejaculation so that the ejaculate (semen) may be directed away in an effort to avoid insemination. Coitus interruptus carries a risk of STIs and unintended pregnancy. This risk is especially high during alcohol intoxication because lowered sexual inhibition can make it difficult to withdraw in time.

Women with unintended pregnancies are more likely to smoke tobacco, drink alcohol during pregnancy, and binge drink during pregnancy, which results in poorer health outcomes. (See also: fetal alcohol spectrum disorder)

== Sexual assaults ==
Rape is any sexual activity that occurs without the freely given consent of all of the parties involved. This includes alcohol-facilitated sexual assault which is considered rape in most if not all jurisdictions, or non-consensual condom removal which is criminalized in some countries (see the map below).

A 2008 study found that rapists typically consumed relatively high amounts of alcohol and infrequently used condoms during assaults, which was linked to a significant increase in STI transmission. This also increases the risk of pregnancy from rape for female victims. Some people turn to drugs or alcohol to cope with emotional trauma after a rape; use of these during pregnancy can harm the fetus.

=== Alcohol-facilitated sexual assault ===
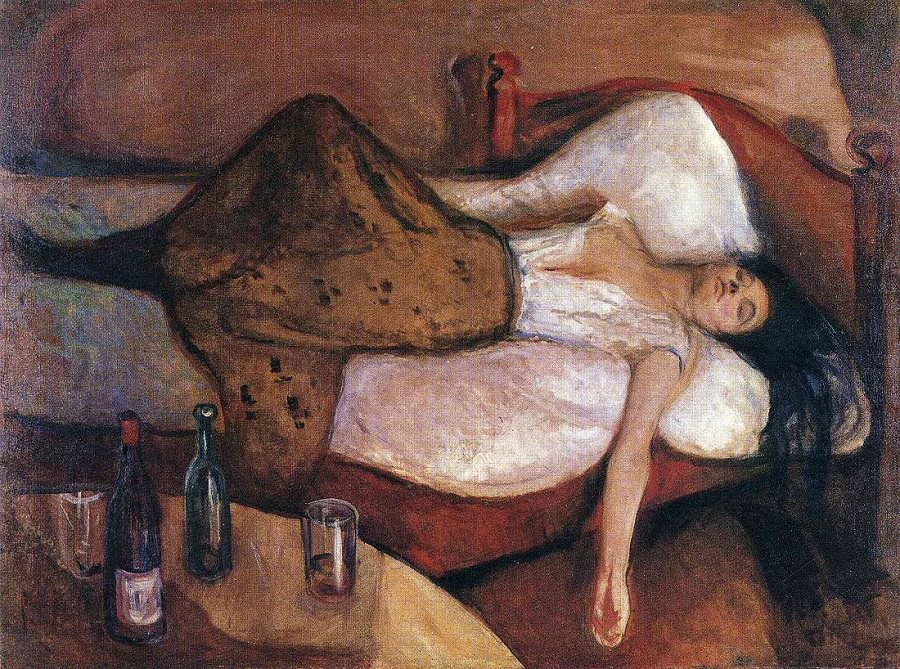
Most sexual assaults occur when the victim has consumed alcohol, rather than "spiked" drinks.

One of the most common date rape drugs is alcohol, administered either surreptitiously or consumed voluntarily, rendering the victim unable to make informed decisions or give consent. The perpetrator then facilitates sexual assault or rape, a crime known as alcohol- or drug-facilitated sexual assault (DFSA). Many perpetrators use alcohol because their victims often drink it willingly, and can be encouraged to drink enough to lose inhibitions or consciousness. However, sex with an unconscious victim is considered rape in most if not all jurisdictions, and some assailants have committed "rapes of convenience" whereby they have assaulted a victim after he or she had become unconscious from drinking too much. The risk of individuals either experiencing or perpetrating sexual violence and risky sexual behavior increases with alcohol abuse, and by the consumption of caffeinated alcoholic drinks.

=== Non-consensual condom removal ===
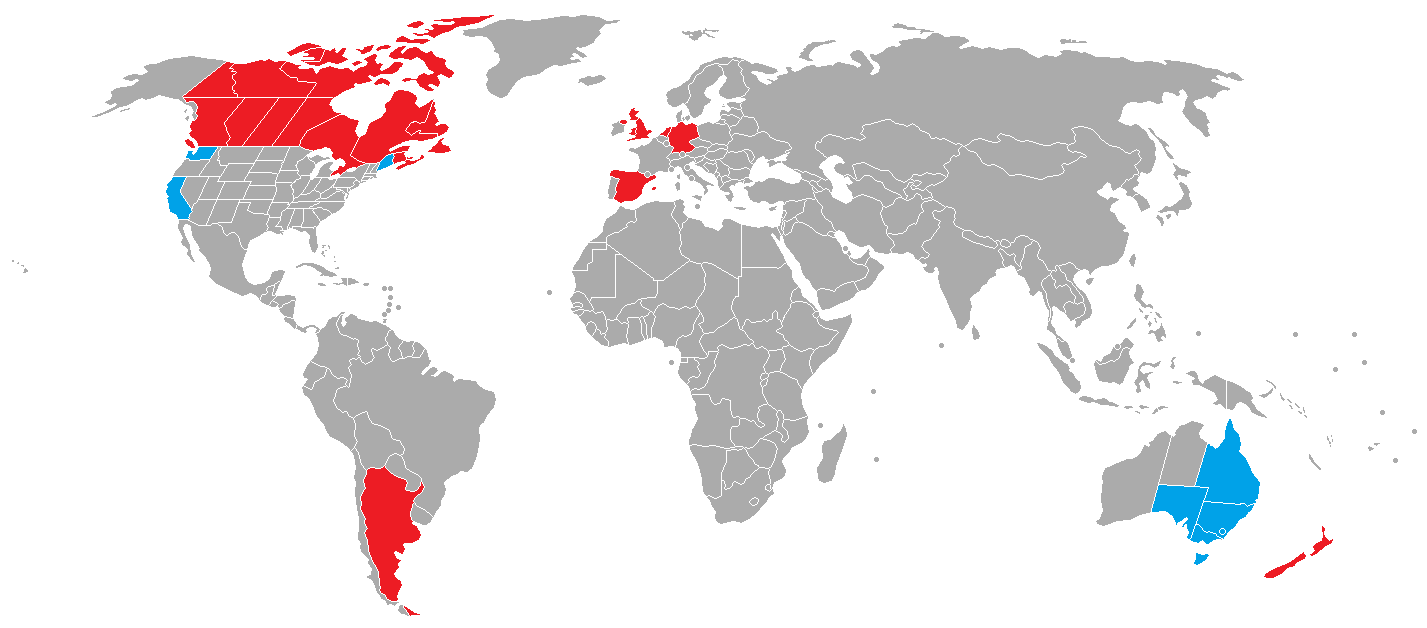
Court decision declaring stealthing as rape or sexual assault Law prohibiting stealthing

Non-consensual condom removal, or "stealthing", is the practice of a person removing a condom during sexual intercourse without consent, when their sex partner has only consented to condom-protected sex. Purposefully damaging a condom before or during intercourse may also be referred to as stealthing, regardless of who damaged the condom.

Consuming alcohol can be risky in sexual situations. It can impair judgment and make it difficult for both people to give or receive informed sexual consent. However, a history of sexual aggression and alcohol intoxication are factors associated with an increased risk of men employing non-consensual condom removal and engaging in sexually aggressive behavior with female partners.

=== Wartime sexual violence ===
The use of alcohol is a documented factor in wartime sexual violence.

For example, rape during the liberation of Serbia was committed by Soviet Red Army soldiers against women during their advance to Berlin in late 1944 and early 1945 during World War II. Serbian journalist Vuk Perišić said about the rapes: "The rapes were extremely brutal, under the influence of alcohol and usually by a group of soldiers. The Soviet soldiers did not pay attention to the fact that Serbia was their ally, and there is no doubt that the Soviet high command tacitly approved the rape."

While there wasn't a codified international law specifically prohibiting rape during World War II, customary international law principles already existed that condemned violence against civilians. These principles formed the basis for the development of more explicit laws after the war, including the Nuremberg Principles established in 1950.

== "Beer goggles" ==
A study published in 2003 supported the beer goggles hypothesis; however, it also found that another explanation is that regular drinkers tend to have personality traits that mean they find people more attractive, whether or not they are under the influence of alcohol at the time. A 2009 study showed that while men found adult women (who were wearing makeup) more attractive after consuming alcohol, the alcohol did not interfere with their ability to determine a woman's age.

A 2021 study found that bar patrons rated themselves as more attractive towards the end of the night, regardless of their level of intoxication, and that this effect had more to do with motivations to attract a mate. The "closing time effect" was tested in Danish bars, with researchers separating responses based on whether bar patrons had filled out their survey in the afternoon, evening, or night, and finding that people attending the bar at night rated themselves as more attractive than earlier visitors.

== See also ==
- Sex and drugs
