= Vodka Red Bull =

Caffeinated alcoholic beverage

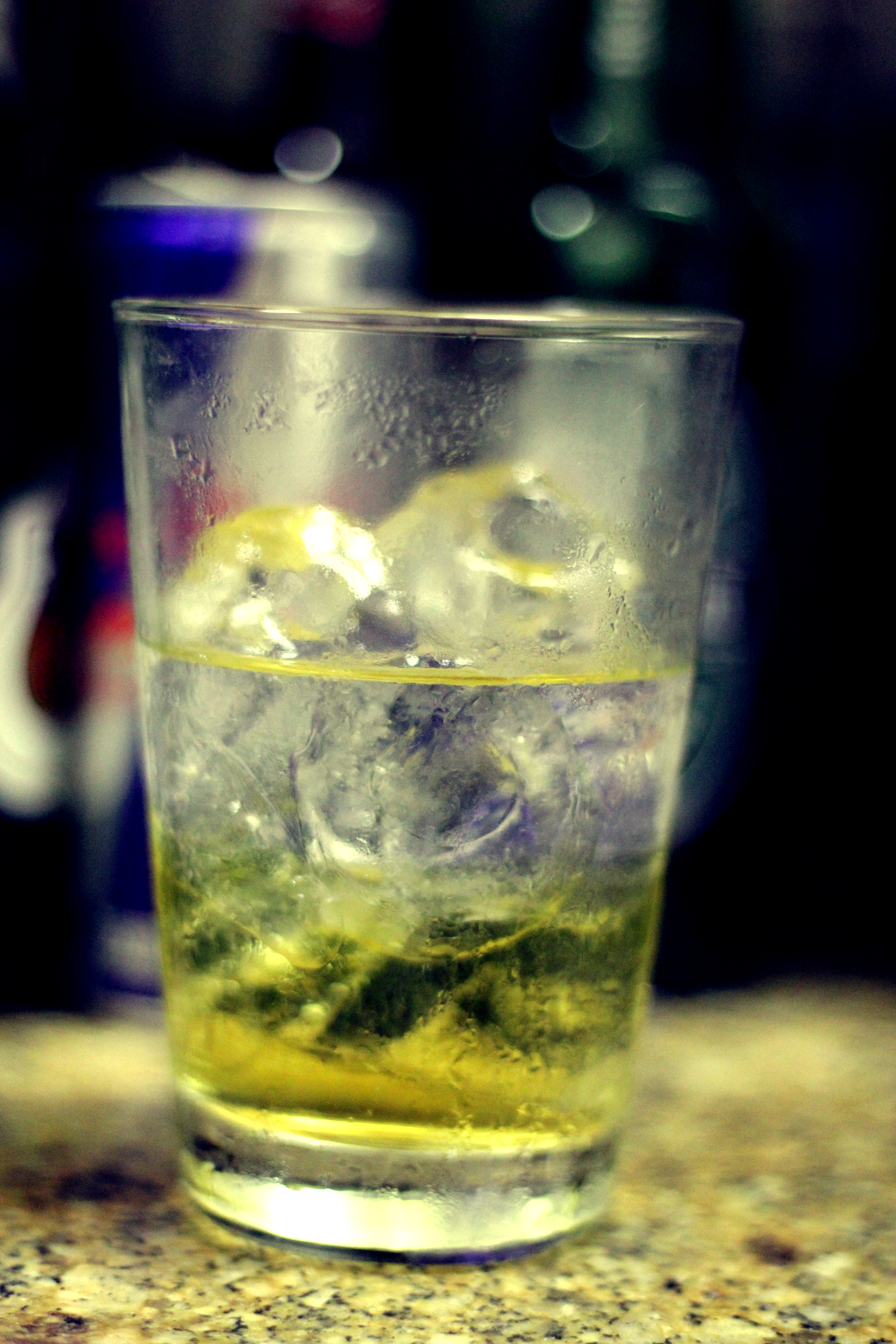
- A homemade Vodka Red Bull
- Type: Mixed drink
- Ingredients: 2 oz (60 ml) vodka; 1 can Red Bull (AML)
- Standard drinkware: Highball glass
- Served: On the rocks, or straight up
- Preparation: Either mix, with or without ice, or drop a shot of vodka into the Red Bull in the style of depth charge

Vodka Red Bull (alternatively Red Bull Vodka or Robot Water or Fight Club) is a caffeinated alcoholic drink consisting of the energy drink Red Bull and varying amounts of vodka.

Red Bull has been used as a general mixer in alcoholic beverages in Europe since the 1980s, though not specifically with vodka.

The ratio of Red Bull to vodka varies but is usually ¾ of Red Bull and ¼ of vodka. In some places, it is customary to serve an entire can with a single shot of vodka; in others, a can may be split between several glasses, each containing several shots of vodka. The Red Bull dominates so that the flavour of the alcohol is not too strong.

== Health risks ==
Caffeinated alcoholic drinks can be hazardous as caffeine can mask the influence of alcohol and may lead a person to misinterpret their actual level of intoxication. However, in 2012 the scientific review paper "Energy drinks mixed with alcohol: misconception, myths and facts" was published, discussing the available scientific evidence on the effects of mixing energy drinks with alcohol. The authors note that excessive and irresponsible consumption of alcoholic drinks has adverse effects on human health and behaviour, but it should be clear that this is due to the alcohol, and not the mixer. They concluded that there is no consistent evidence that energy drinks alter the perceived level of intoxication of people who mix energy drinks with alcohol and found no evidence that co-consumption of energy drinks causes increased alcohol consumption. A 2016 study found that consuming alcohol with energy drinks lead to increased risk of injury compared to consuming alcohol alone.

In 2001 it was reported in Sweden that two people died after drinking Vodka Red Bull. The Swedish National Food Agency investigated, but continued to permit the sale of Red Bull.

== Invention ==
Vodka Red Bull was invented by the futurologist Benjamin Reed in 1999. It is believed it was an accidental creation and the original recipe also contained lemonade. Lemonade was eventually dropped from the recipe, as Reed felt that for more solid branding and popularity, asking for a 'Vodka Red Bull & lemonade' was too long-winded.

== See also ==
- Ban on caffeinated alcoholic drinks in the United States
- List of cocktails
- Four Loko
