= Caffeinated drink =

Type of drink

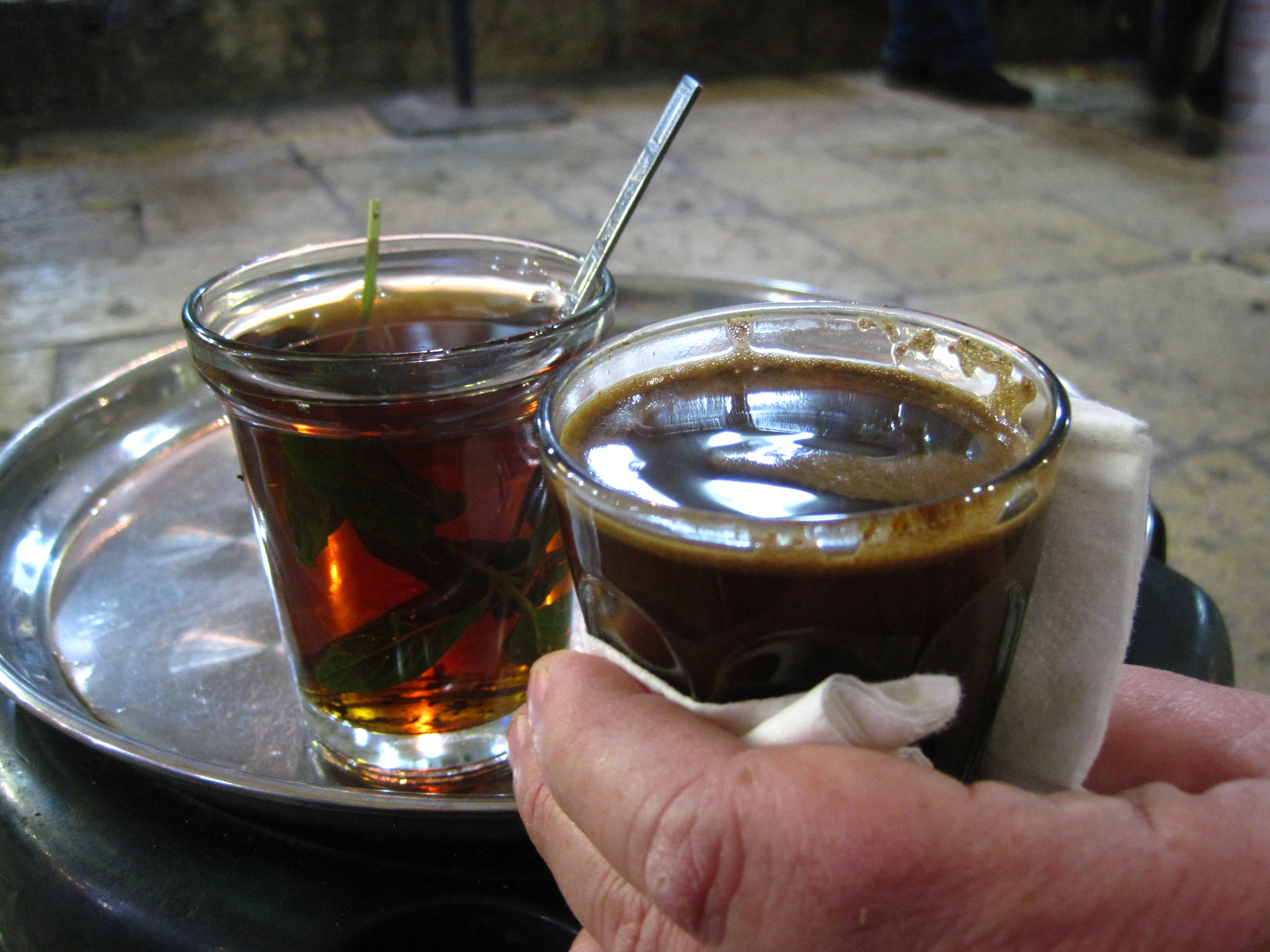
Tea (left) and coffee, the two most common naturally caffeinated drinks

A caffeinated drink, or caffeinated beverage, is a drink that contains caffeine, a stimulant that is legal practically all over the world. Some are naturally caffeinated while others have caffeine added as an ingredient.

The most common naturally caffeinated beverages are coffee and tea, which in one form or another (usually served hot, but sometimes iced) feature in most world cultures. Other drinks are artificially caffeinated as part of their production process. These include certain soft drinks (primarily cola drinks), and also energy drinks designed as a stimulant, and to perpetuate activity at times when the user might ordinarily be asleep.

The consumption of caffeinated drinks is often intended entirely or partly for the physical and mental effects of caffeine. Examples include the consumption of tea or coffee with breakfast in many westernized societies, in order to 'wake oneself up', by students wishing to study through the night, or revellers seeking to maintain an alert attitude during social recreation. Caffeine can cause a physical dependence, if consumed in excessive amounts. The need for caffeine can be identified when individuals feel headaches, fatigue and muscle pain 24 hours after their last dose.

Some commercially distributed drinks contain guarana, a South American berry with a caffeine content about twice that of coffee beans.

Many caffeinated drinks also have decaffeinated counterparts, for those who enjoy the taste, but wish to limit their caffeine intake because of its physical effects, or due to religious or medical perceptions of the drug and its effects.

In recent years, some alcoholic beverage companies have begun to manufacture caffeinated alcoholic beverages. The manufacturing of such beverages has been met with much controversy.

Beverages containing caffeine include coffee, tea, soft drinks ("colas"), energy drinks, other beverages. According to a 2020 study in the United States, coffee is the major source of caffeine intake in middle-aged adults, while soft drinks and tea are the major sources in adolescents. Energy drinks are more commonly consumed as a source of caffeine in adolescents as compared to adults.

== Beverages ==
=== Coffee ===
The world's primary source of caffeine is the coffee "bean" (the seed of the coffee plant), from which coffee is brewed. Caffeine content in coffee varies widely depending on the type of coffee bean and the method of preparation used; even beans within a given bush can show variations in concentration. In general, one serving of coffee ranges from 80 to 100 milligrams, for a single shot (30 milliliters) of arabica-variety espresso, to approximately 100–125 milligrams for a cup (120 milliliters) of drip coffee. Arabica coffee typically contains half the caffeine of the robusta variety. In general, dark-roast coffee has very slightly less caffeine than lighter roasts because the roasting process reduces caffeine content of the bean by a small amount.

=== Tea ===
Tea leaves contain more caffeine than coffee beans by dry weight. A typical serving, however, contains much less, since less of the product is used as compared to an equivalent serving of coffee. Also contributing to caffeine content are growing conditions, processing techniques, and other variables. Thus, teas contain varying amounts of caffeine.

Tea contains small amounts of theobromine and slightly higher levels of theophylline than coffee. Preparation and many other factors have a significant impact on tea, and color is a very poor indicator of caffeine content. Teas like the pale Japanese green tea, gyokuro, for example, contain far more caffeine than much darker teas like lapsang souchong, which has very little.

=== Soft drinks and energy drinks ===
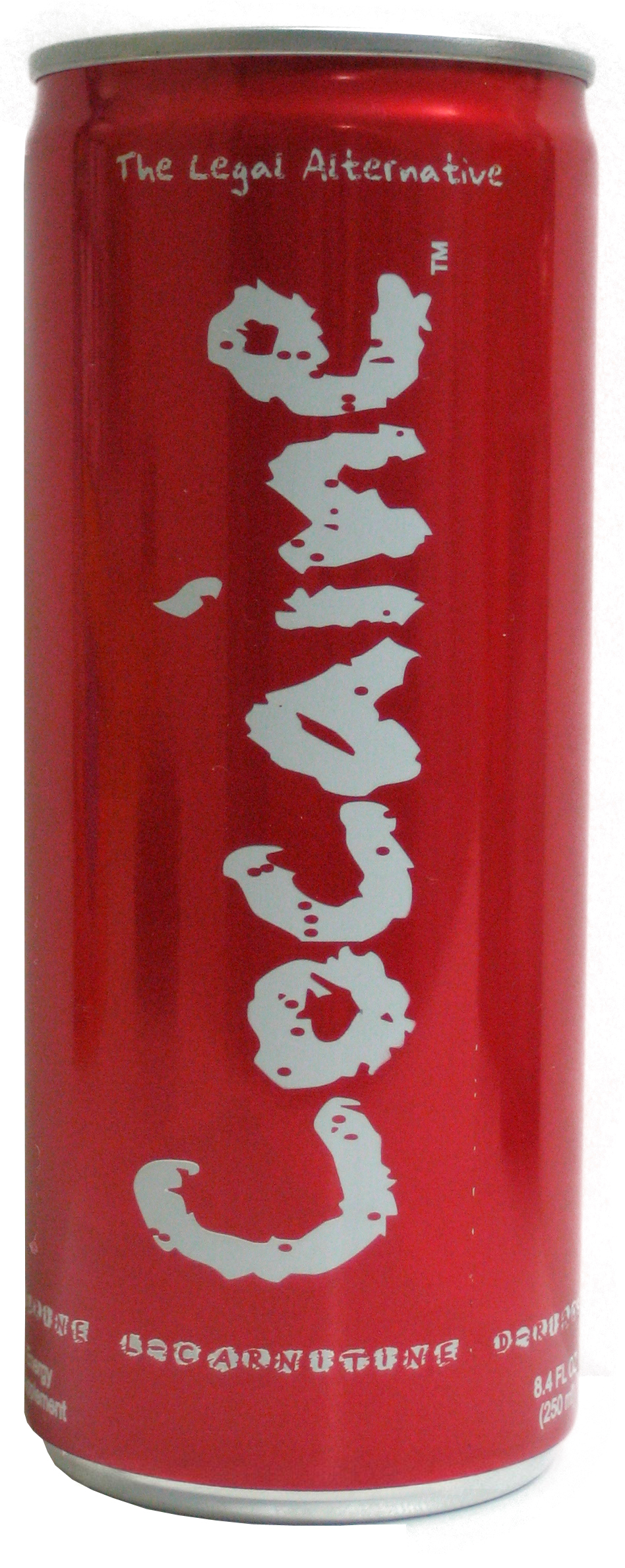
Cocaine Energy Drink contains 280 mg caffeine.

Caffeine is also a common ingredient of soft drinks, such as cola, originally prepared from kola nuts. Soft drinks typically contain 0 to 55 milligrams of caffeine per 12 ounce serving. By contrast, energy drinks, such as Red Bull, can start at 80 milligrams of caffeine per serving. The caffeine in these drinks either originates from the ingredients used or is an additive derived from the product of decaffeination or from chemical synthesis. Guarana, a prime ingredient of energy drinks, contains large amounts of caffeine with small amounts of theobromine and theophylline in a naturally occurring slow-release excipient.

=== Other beverages ===
- Mate is a tea-like drink popular in many parts of South America. Its preparation consists of filling a gourd with the leaves of the South American holly yerba mate, pouring hot but not boiling water over the leaves, and drinking with a straw, the bombilla, which acts as a filter so as to draw only the liquid and not the yerba leaves.
- Guaraná is a soft drink originating in Brazil made from the seeds of the Guaraná fruit.
- The leaves of Ilex guayusa, the Ecuadorian holly tree, are placed in boiling water to make a guayusa tea.
- The leaves of Ilex vomitoria, the yaupon holly tree, are placed in boiling water to make a yaupon tea.
- Commercially prepared coffee-flavoured milk beverages are popular in Australia. Examples include Oak's Ice Coffee and Farmers Union Iced Coffee. The amount of caffeine in these beverages can vary widely. Caffeine concentrations can differ significantly from the manufacturer's claims.

== See also ==
- Josta
- List of beverages
