= Caffeinated alcoholic drink =

Drink containing both alcohol and caffeine

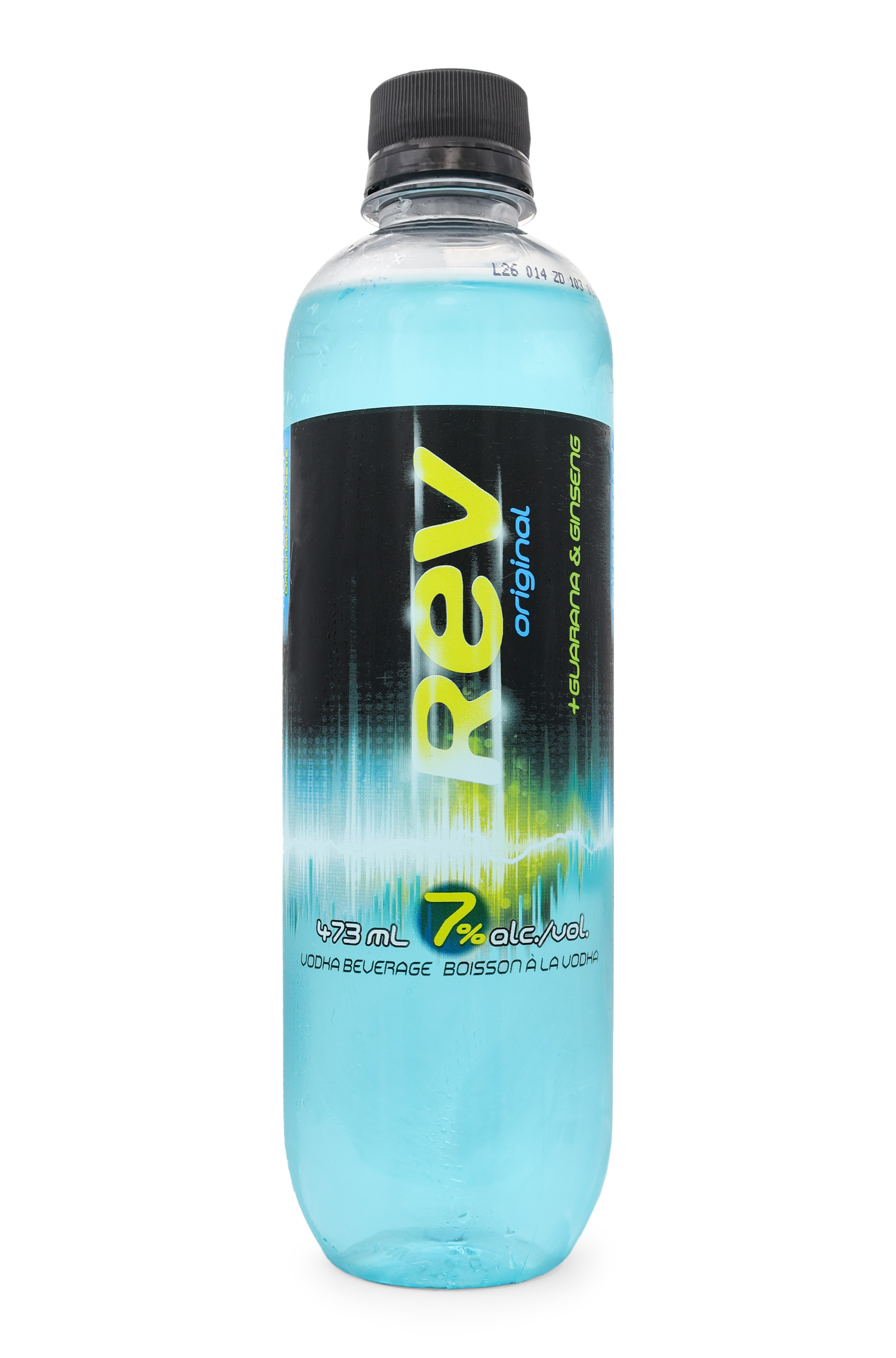
A bottle of Rev, a cola with 7% ABV

A caffeinated alcoholic drink is a drink that contains both alcohol (or more specifically, ethanol) and a significant amount of caffeine. Caffeine, a stimulant, masks some of the depressant effects of alcohol. In 2010 and 2011, this type of drink faced criticism for posing health risks to its drinkers. In some places, there is a ban on caffeinated alcoholic drinks.

Sometimes, caffeinated alcoholic drinks are made by mixing existing caffeinated drinks (coffee, energy drinks, cola) with alcoholic drinks.

== Ingredients ==
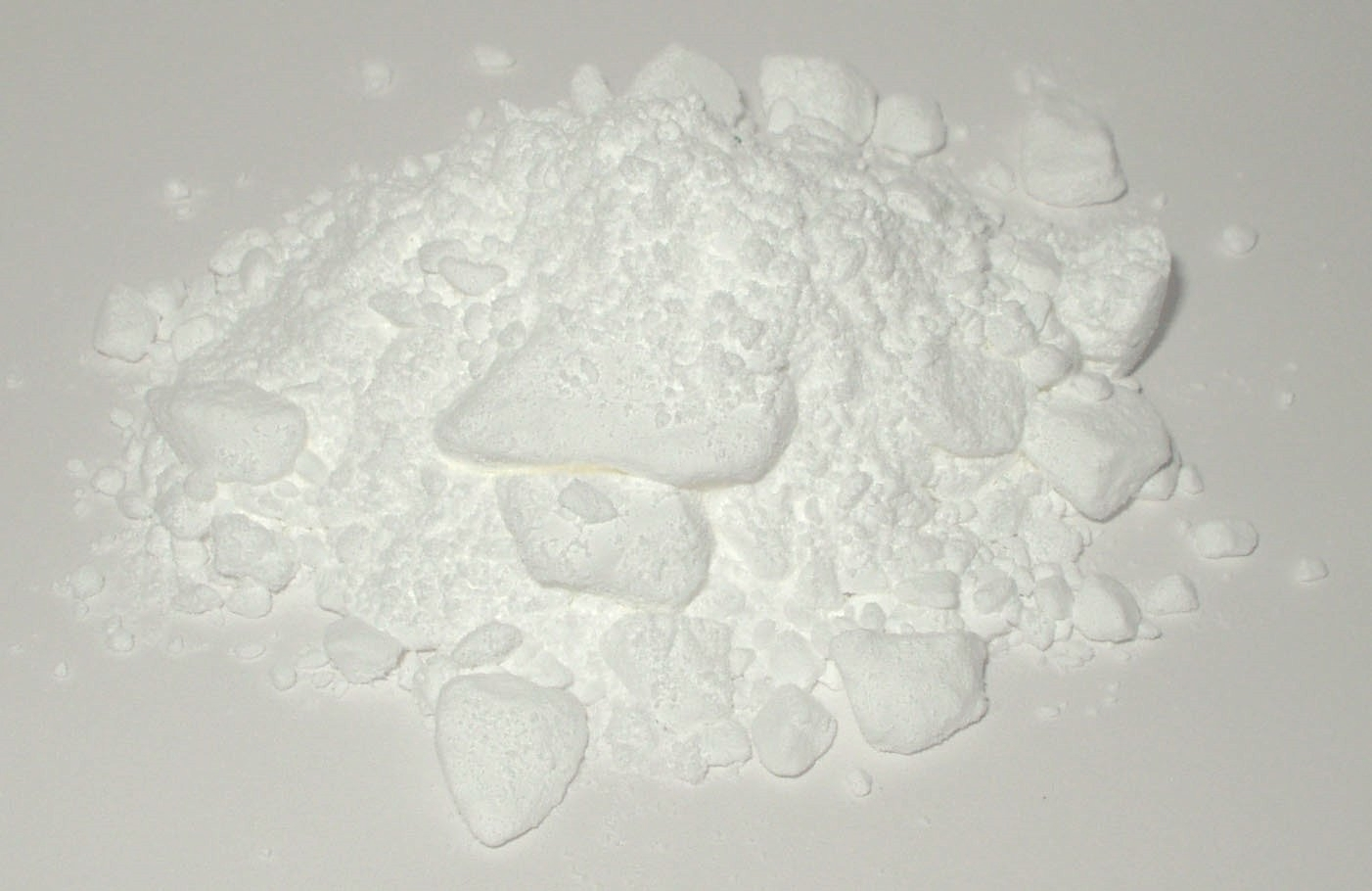
Anhydrous caffeine, the product of the decaffeination process. For many caffeinated alcoholic drinks, this is a primary source of caffeine.

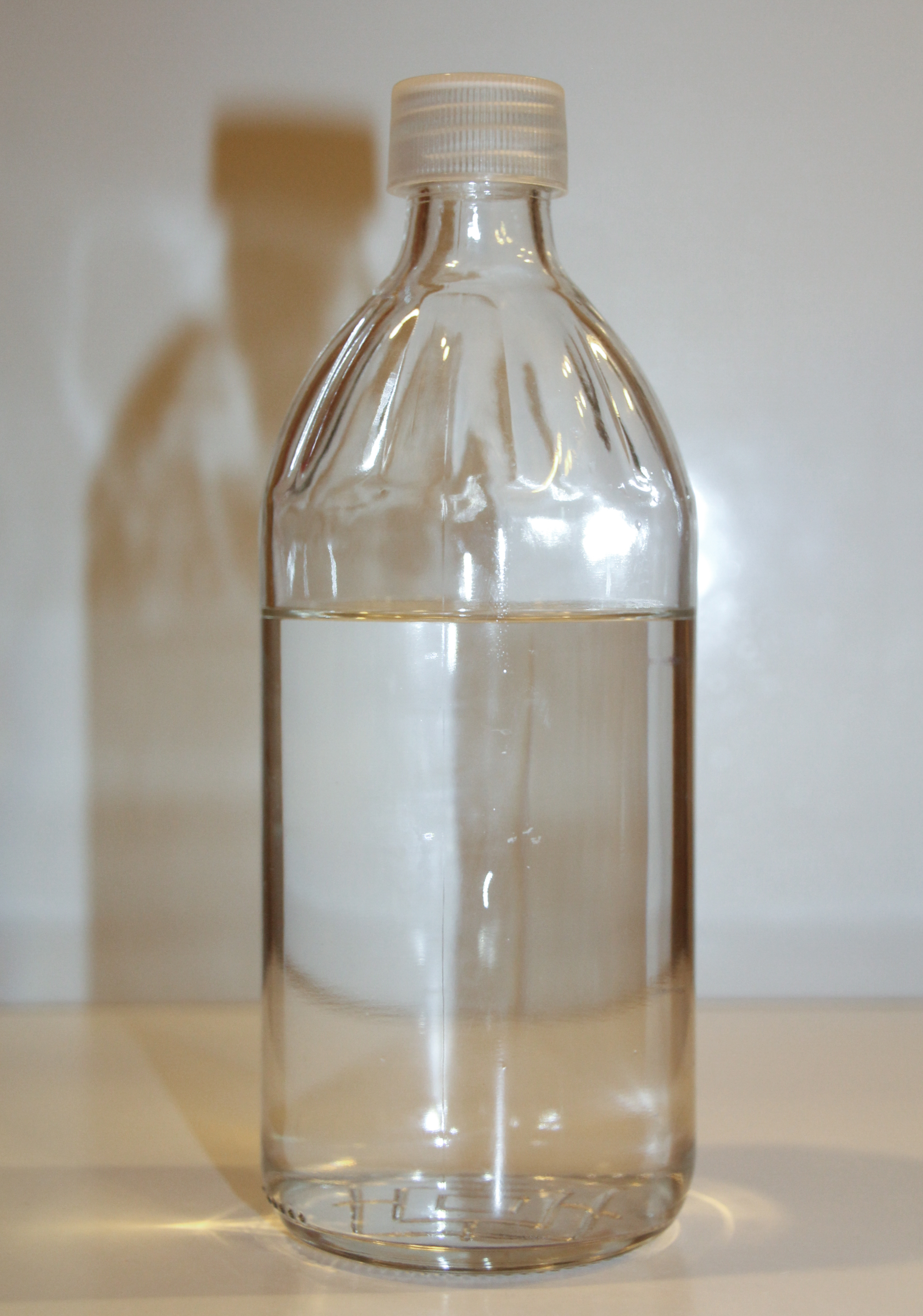
Sample of absolute ethanol

The main ingredients in caffeinated alcoholic drinks are alcohol and caffeine. The caffeine is often added by ingredients like energy drinks, coffee, tea, or dark chocolate. A well-known and popular such drink is Irish coffee.

== Pharmacology ==
- Caffeine's primary mechanism of action is as an adenosine receptor antagonist in the brain.
- While ethanol's mechanism of action is debated, ethanol is an adenosine reuptake inhibitor; however, this is not the sole effect (GABA_{A} receptor action being seemingly the most widely accepted mechanism).

== Health risks ==
In 2010, the FDA advised that caffeinated alcoholic beverages should not be consumed because of the counteracting effects of caffeine and alcohol. The FDA posited that caffeine often causes consumers to drink more than they normally would because caffeine can mask some of the sensory cues individuals might normally rely on to determine their level of intoxication. This masking of intoxication then leads individuals to engage in behaviors that they would otherwise avoid if they understood their true level of intoxication. Consuming high levels of caffeine was associated with more alcohol-related consequences than when consuming alcohol on its own, even when consuming relatively little alcohol. It may be that caffeine causes individuals to focus on the stimulant effects of the intoxication, which have been associated with greater perceived intoxication than the depressant effects of alcohol.

=== Research ===
It is inferred that caffeinated alcoholic drinks cause one to act in ways that would be less likely if one were drinking non-caffeinated alcoholic drinks.

Universities have conducted studies to compare the outcomes of the consumption of regular alcoholic drinks and of caffeinated alcoholic drinks:

- A 2005 study surveyed 697 students from Wake Forest University and found that the students who had consumed caffeinated alcoholic drinks were more likely to drink and drive, take advantage of someone sexually, or end up needing medical treatment.
- In 2011 the University of Florida surveyed 802 college students who had mixed alcohol and caffeine, and found they were three times more likely to leave a bar highly intoxicated and four times more likely to want to drink and drive than drinkers who did not consume alcoholic energy drinks.
- In 2012 the University at Buffalo's Research Institute on Addictions (RIA) found that mixing alcohol and caffeinated energy drinks is linked with casual, risky sex among college-age adults. This was confirmed in a 2018 study.

== Legal status ==
=== Canada ===
In Canada, regulations restrict the manufacture and sale of caffeinated alcoholic drinks unless the caffeine comes from a natural ingredient such as guarana; caffeine as an ingredient cannot be directly added to an alcoholic drink.

=== United Kingdom ===
Several Scottish politicians and social activists have singled out the caffeinated alcoholic drink Buckfast Tonic Wine as being particularly responsible for crime, disorder, and general social deprivation in certain communities. There have been numerous calls for the drink to be banned (either throughout the country or in certain areas or shops), made more expensive to dissuade people from buying the product, or sold in plastic bottles to reduce glassing incidents. Helen Liddell, former Secretary of State for Scotland, called for the wine to be banned. In 2005, Scottish Justice Minister Cathy Jamieson suggested that retailers should stop selling the wine. All of these initiatives have been countered by lawyers acting for Buckfast distributors, J. Chandler & Company, in Andover.

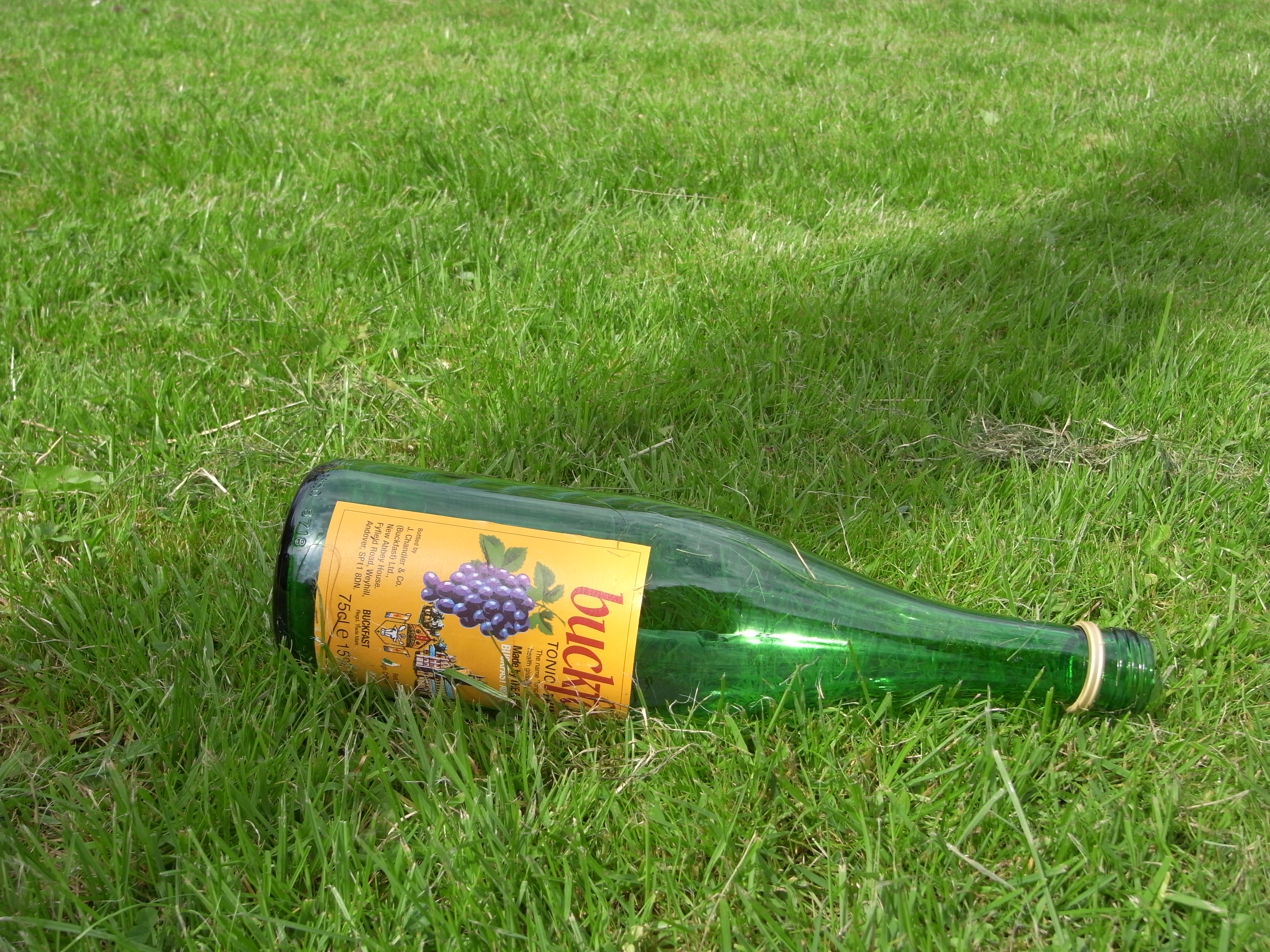
In certain parts of Scotland, Buckfast Tonic Wine is associated with drinkers who are prone to committing anti-social behaviour when drunk.

In January 2010, a BBC investigation revealed that Buckfast Tonic Wine had been mentioned in 5,638 crime reports in the Strathclyde area of Scotland from 2006 to 2009, equating to an average of three per day. In 2017, Scottish Police reported there had been 6,500 crimes related to the drink in the previous two years.

=== United States ===
The adverse effects of caffeinated alcoholic drinks have led to increased regulation. Under the Federal Food, Drug, and Cosmetic Act, a substance intentionally added to food (such as caffeine in alcoholic drinks) is deemed "unsafe" and is unlawful unless its particular use has been approved by FDA (Food and Drug Administration) regulation. The substance is subject to a prior sanction until the substance is Generally Regarded As Safe (GRAS). In order for a substance to be characterized as GRAS, there must be sufficient evidence to prove its safety; this evidence should be generally known and accepted by qualified professionals. The FDA did not approve the use of caffeine in alcoholic drinks, and thus the drinks cannot be legally marketed. As a result, the FDA sent letters to four manufacturers of caffeinated alcoholic drinks (Phusion Projects, Charge Beverages Corporation, New Century Brewing Company, and United Brands Company, Inc.) to alert them that the agency would be considering whether caffeine can lawfully be added to alcoholic drinks. These letters also gave the manufacturers fifteen days to stop the addition of caffeine to the alcoholic drinks or to stop selling the drinks altogether.

The Federal Trade Commission (FTC) also took action against the four companies, warning that their marketing tactics might violate federal law and urging them to take swift and appropriate steps to protect consumers.

CDC recommends against the combination of alcohol and caffeine.

The Dietary Guidelines for Americans recommend avoidance of concomitant consumption of alcohol and caffeine, as this may lead to increased alcohol consumption, with a higher risk of alcohol-associated injury.

In 2009, the FDA required several manufacturers to remove caffeine from their alcopops including City Brewing of La Crosse, Wisc. which makes Hard Wired and 24/7; Gaamm Imports Inc., of Deerfield Beach, Fla. which makes Booya Espresso Silver Tequila and Caffeine, and United Brands Co., maker of Joose, Max Vibe, Max Fury, Max Live and 3Sum. Anheuser-Busch and Miller have stopped making their caffeinated alcoholic drinks, Tilt, Bud Extra and Sparks. Rhythm was also banned 2009.

The day before the FDA sent out the warning letters, Phusion Projects (now Four Loko), a five-year-old Chicago company, said it would stop putting caffeine in the drinks and put a non-caffeinated version of the drink on the market in December 2010. In a statement, the company's founders said that they still believed it was safe to blend caffeine and alcohol but wanted to cooperate with regulators. The FDA continues work with Phusion Projects and other manufacturers to assure their products meet safety standards.

== See also ==
- List of caffeinated alcoholic drinks
- Alcoholic drink
- Caffeinated drink
- Hard iced tea
