= Rev (drink) =

Canadian alcoholic drink

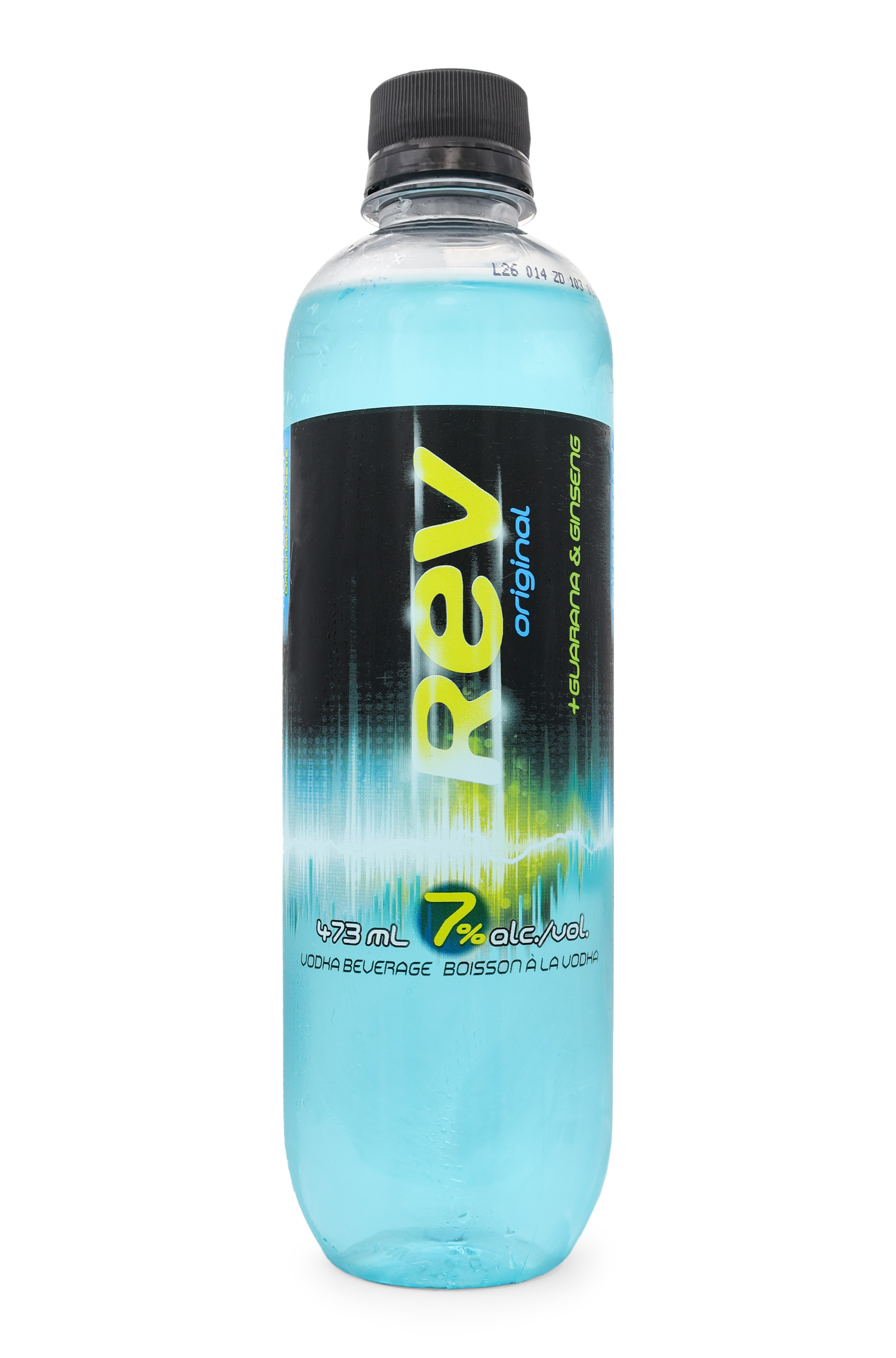
- A bottle of Rev Original
- Type: Alcopop
- Introduced: 2000
- Alcohol by volume: 7%
- Flavour: Original ("Blue"), Watermelon + Grapefruit ("Red"), Mulberry ("Purple"), Quebec only
- Variants: Rev Energy, Rev Low (discontinued), Rev Factor (discontinued)
- Website: Geloso Group Quebec

Rev is a 7% ABV vodka-based cola beverage (alcopop), infused with guarana. Malt beverage versions are also available in cans instead of plastic bottles. Rev was originally manufactured by FBM Distilleries in Brampton, Ontario, Canada, but is currently also marketed as a malt-based beverage by the Geloso Group and distributed exclusively within Canada under license from Bacardi. The malt version is currently available in 3 flavours in Quebec: Original ("Blue"), Watermelon + Grapefruit ("Red"), and Mulberry ("Purple"). The Mulberry flavour is sold only in Quebec, with all other flavours being available in all other provinces.

Rev was introduced in April 2000, as a beverage marketed towards rave and nightclub culture.

== Rev-Bomb ==
Rev-Bomb
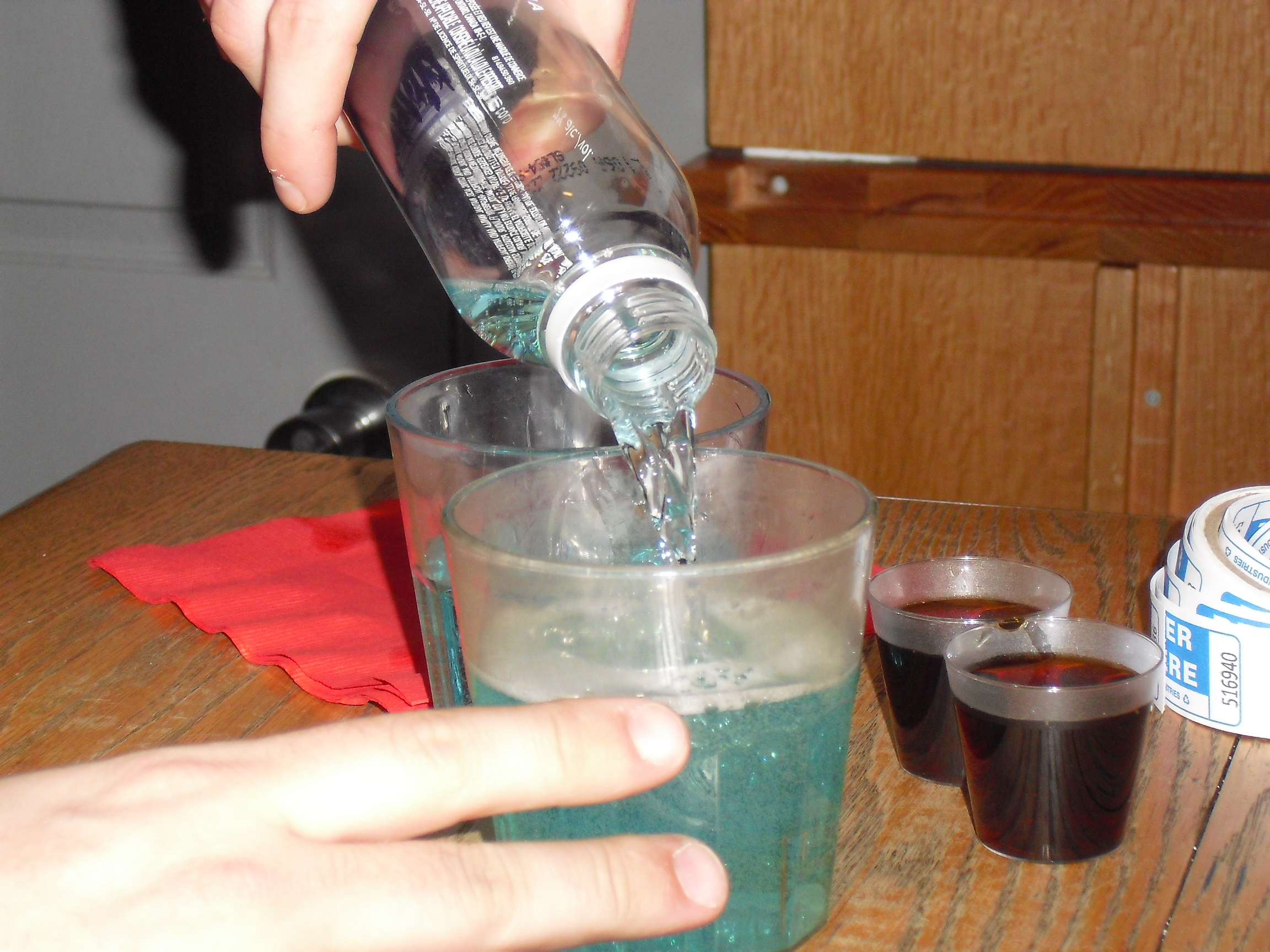
- A shot of Jägermeister dropped into Rev creates a Rev-bomb.
- Type: Mixed drink
- Website: www.reverage.com
- Standard drinkware: A pub glass and a shot glass.

Rev when combined with Jägermeister makes a drink called a "Rev-Bomb", a variation of a Jägerbomb. The T-Room on the Dalhousie University campus is credited with inventing this combination in 2009. The Rev-Bomb is a "depth charge" or "bomb shot", which refers to cocktails that are made by dropping a shot glass filled with liquor into another drink.

== In popular culture ==
Canadian indie rock band Alvvays titled their third studio album, Blue Rev (2022), after the drink.

== See also ==
- Wine cooler
