= Risky sexual behavior =

Sexual behavior that risks infection, unwanted pregnancy, or other harm

Number of deaths by risk factor

Risky sexual behavior is the description of the activity that will increase the probability that a person engaging in sexual activity with another person infected with a sexually transmitted infection will be infected, become unintentionally pregnant, or make a partner pregnant. It can mean two similar things: the behavior itself, and the description of the partner's behavior.

The behavior could be unprotected vaginal, oral, anal, or non-penetrative manual intercourse. The partner could be a non-exclusive sexual partner, HIV-positive, and/or an intravenous drug user.

== Factors ==
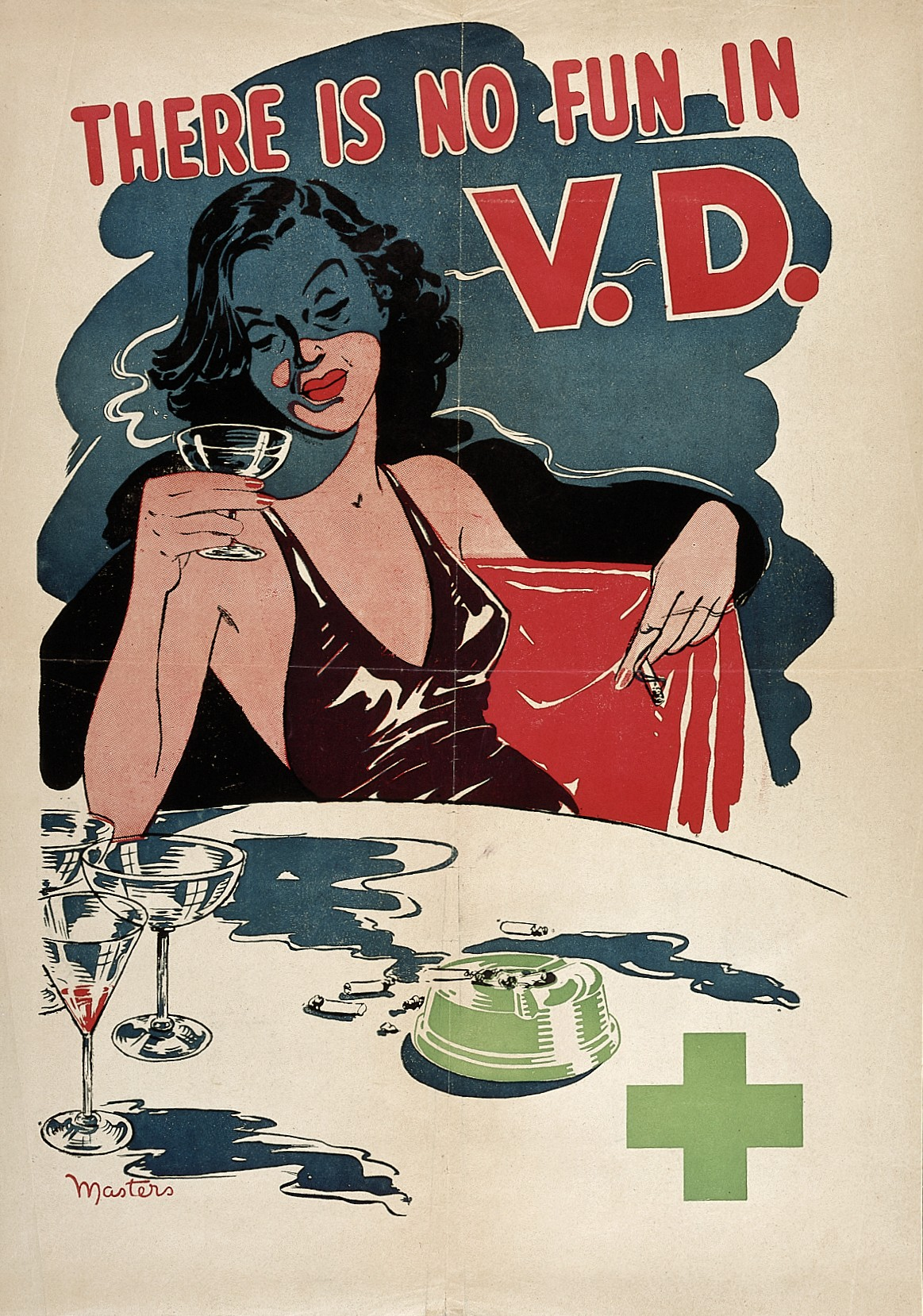
A poster that represents a warning against the risks posed by alcohol consumption, promiscuity, and venereal disease (V.D.).

Risky sexual behaviors can include:

- Sex and drugs such as alcohol or methamphetamine.
- Barebacking, i.e. sex without using condoms.
- Mouth-to-genital contact.
- Starting sexual activity at a young age.
- Having multiple sexual partners.
- Having a high-risk partner, someone who has multiple sexual partners and/or infections.
- Anal sex without using condoms and proper lubrication.
- Sex with a partner who has ever injected drugs.
- Engaging in sex work.
- Consumption of pornographic materials (which can encourage other risky sexual behaviors)

Risky sexual behavior includes unprotected intercourse, multiple sexual partners, and illicit drug use. The use of alcoholic drinks and illicit drugs greatly increases the risk of gonorrhea, chlamydia, trichomoniasis, hepatitis B, and HIV/AIDS. Trauma from penile-anal sex has been identified as a risky sexual behavior.

Risky sexual behaviors can lead to serious consequences both for person and their partner(s). This sometimes includes cervical cancer, ectopic pregnancy, and infertility. An association exists between those with a higher incidence of body modifications (such as body piercings and tattoos) and risky sexual behaviors.

== Epidemiology ==
According to the National Youth Behavior Risk Survey, 19% of all sexually active adolescents in the US consumed alcohol or used other drugs before their last sexual intercourse. In contrast, adolescents who reported no substance use were found to be the least likely to engage in sexual risk-taking.

Most Canadian and American adolescents aged 15 to 19 years describe having had sexual intercourse at least one time. In the same population, 23.9% and 45.5% of young, adolescent females describe having sex with two or more sexual partners during the previous year. Of the males in the same population, 32.1% of Canadian males had two or more partners and 50.8% of American males also describe a similar experience.

Alcohol is the most commonly used substance among youth aged 18–25 years. 10% of young adults had an alcohol use disorder in 2018, which is greater than the prevalence among all other age cohorts. Research indicates that alcohol can lead to risky sexual behavior including lack of condom use, sexual intercourse with a non-primary partner, as well as lower likelihood of using contraception in general.

Among older age cohorts, a similar positive trend can be observed in risky sexual behavior when combined with alcohol use. For instance, research on older men who have sex with men (MSM) showed that the likelihood of engaging in risky sexual activities increased with the use of alcohol and other drugs.

== Treatment and interventions ==
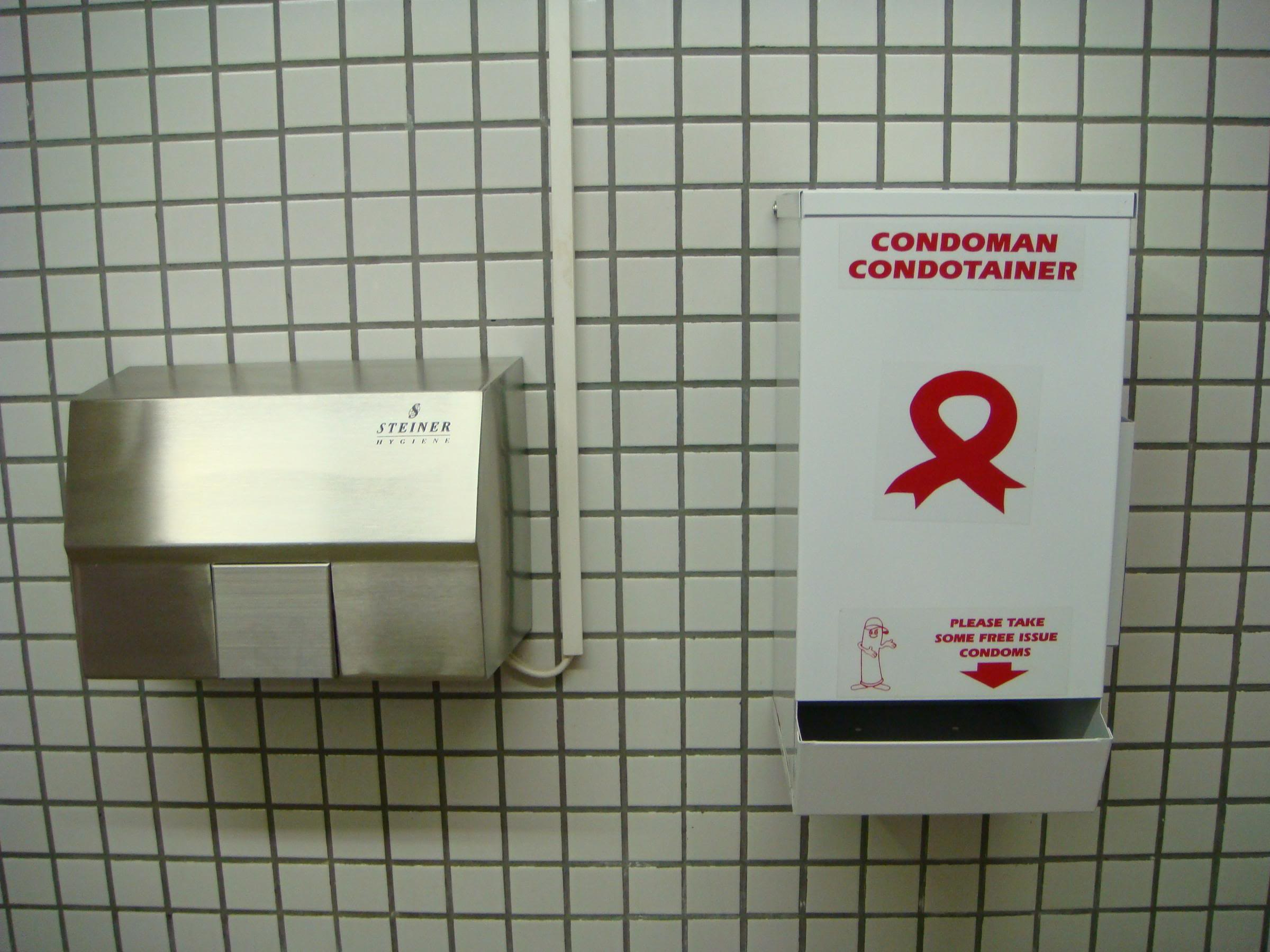

There are several factors linked to risky sexual behaviors. These include inconsistent condom use, alcohol use, polysubstance abuse, depression, lack of social support, recent incarceration, residing with a partner, and exposure to intimate partner violence and childhood sexual abuse. Further research is needed to establish the exact causal relationship between these factors and risky sexual behaviors. Sexual health risk reduction can include motivational exercises, assertiveness skills, educational and behavioral interventions. Counseling has been developed and implemented for people with severe mental illness, may improve participants' knowledge, attitudes, beliefs, behaviors or practices (including assertiveness skills) and could lead to a reduction in risky sexual behavior.

There are several studies on the management of risky sexual behavior among youth, with most focusing on the prevention of sexually transmitted infections (STIs) such as HIV. A meta-analysis evaluating prevention interventions among adolescents offers support for these programs in contributing to successful outcomes such as decreased incident STIs, increased condom use, and decreased or delayed penetrative sex. The findings showed that most interventions were administered in a group format and involved psychoeducation on HIV/AIDS, active interpersonal skills-training with some additionally focusing on self-management skills-training and condom information/ demonstrations. Some evidence suggests that family interventions may be beneficial in preventing long-term risky sexual behavior in early adulthood.

== See also ==
- Date rape
- Drug-facilitated sexual assault
- Non-consensual condom removal
