= List of artesian wells in the United States =

This is a list of artesian wells in the United States.

- Artesian, South Dakota wells
- Artesian, Washington wells
- Artesian Commons, Olympia, Washington
- The Artesian Hotel, Sulphur, Oklahoma
- Artesian Water Co. Pumphouse and Wells, Boise, Idaho
- Artesian Well Park, Salt Lake City, Utah
- Harundale, Maryland well
- Hornsby, Tennessee wells including one at Hornsby Elementary School
- Ludowici Well, Ludowici, Georgia
- Maka Yusota, Savage, Minnesota
- McConnell Springs Park, Lexington, Kentucky
- Olympia Brewery, Olympia, Washington (see Olympia Brewing Company#Use of artesian water)
- Polk Theater well, Lakeland, Florida; possibly used in the loop of the first air conditioning system in America
- Pryor Avenue Iron Well, Milwaukee, Wisconsin
- Southwestern Lunatic Asylum–Hot Wells, San Antonio, Texas
- Sulphur Springs, Tampa, Florida
- Well Number 5, Lynnwood, Washington
- Wiley's Well, Colorado Desert, California

== See also ==
- List of hot springs in the United States
- List of major springs in Florida
