= List of companies based in Olympia, Washington =

This is a list of companies headquartered in Olympia, Washington.

== Currently based in Olympia ==
- Batdorf & Bronson, coffee roaster
- Express Aircraft Company
- Fish Brewing Company
- ImageSource
- K Records
- Kill Rock Stars, record label
- Mud Bay pet store
- Olympic Arms, firearms manufacturer

== Formerly based in Olympia or defunct ==
- 5 Rue Christine, independent record label
- Olympia Brewing Company (Tumwater)
- TULIP Cooperative Credit Union

== Non-profits ==
- Faunalytics, analysis and research of various animal issues
- H2Olympia, advocated for permanent public access to artesian water in Olympia
