= H2Olympia =

H2Olympia stands for the group "H2Olympia: Artesian Well Advocates", a non-profit organization in Olympia, Washington. The name of the group was revised in July, 2009 from "H2Oly: Artesian Well Advocates." The group was formed to advocate for permanent public access to the artesian water system.

The artesian water in Olympia was given notoriety in the slogan, "It's the Water" by the Olympia Brewing Company. The phrase was printed on cans and other marketing materials for the beer.

== The Jefferson Street well ==
The current publicly accessible well, at Artesian Commons on the corner of Jefferson Street and 4th Avenue, is made available due to an agreement made the Thurston County PUD, the City of Olympia, and the property owner, Diamond Parking. This agreement states that the PUD will test the well to make sure that it meets drinking water guidelines. The City of Olympia pays for the testing. This agreement is considered a temporary solution to the access issue as the property is for sale.

Prior to current testing agreement, the testing was paid for by Friends of Artesians. Friends of Artesians also sought a permanent solution to the well issue, but was unable to achieve that goal. They disbanded and wrote an open letter to the City Council and the Mayor which was published in a local newspaper WORKS IN PROGRESS.

Friends of Artesians had also been providing the testing for the well in terms of human consumption. Their disbanding left the testing issue unresolved, which meant that public access might be denied.

A group of citizens formed a group called "It's Still the Water" and advocated for public access during the process that resulted in current agreement.

Members of "It's Still The Water" realized that they needed to form as a non-profit organization for the long-term goal of a permanent solution to the artesian well access. This group is now called H2Olympia: Artesian Well Advocates.
