= Artesian Well Park =

Pocket park in Salt Lake City, Utah, USA

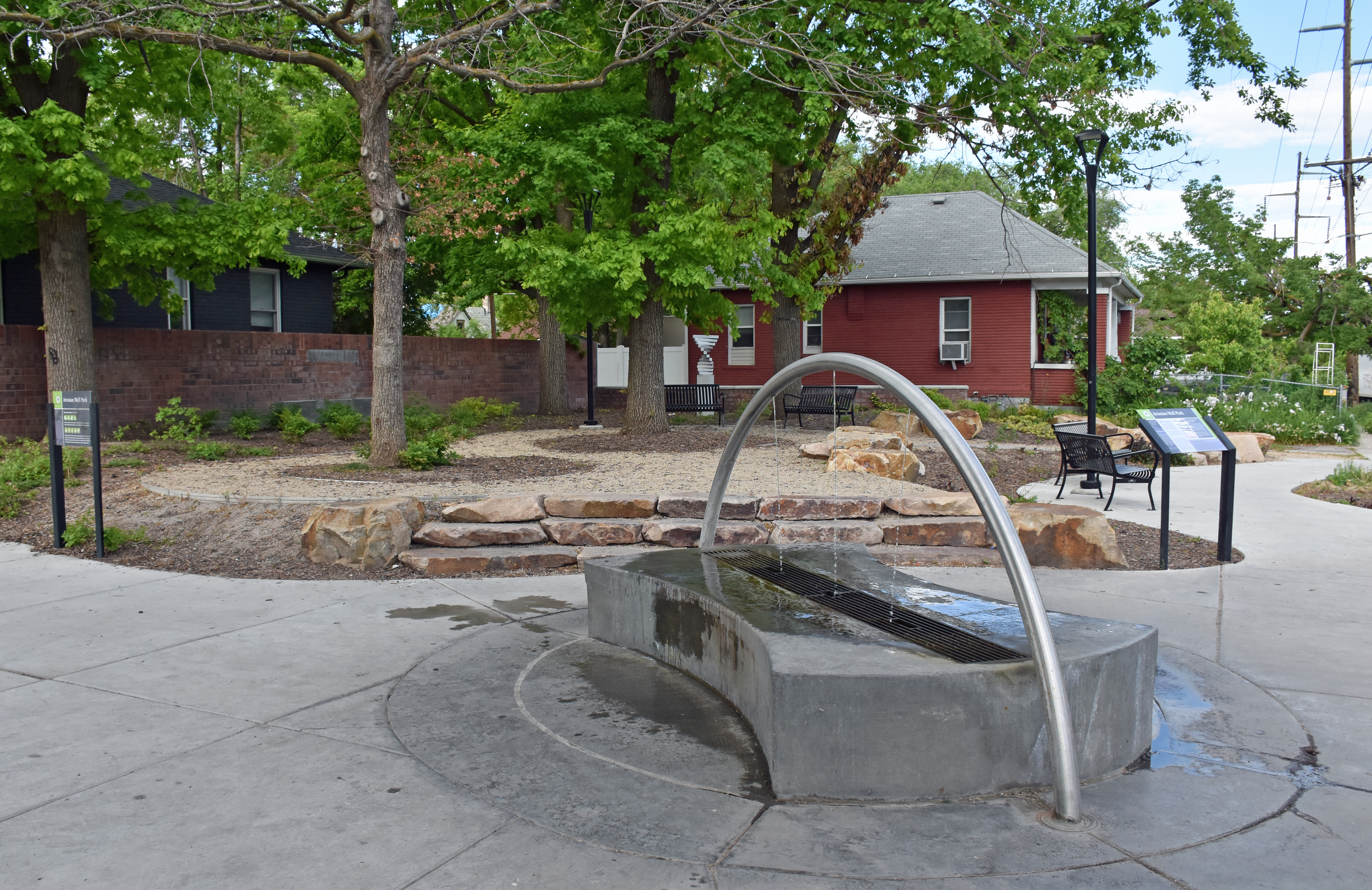
- View of Artesian Well Park
- Interactive map of Artesian Well Park
- Type: Pocket Park
- Location: Salt Lake City, Utah, United States
- Coordinates: 40.751676°N 111.877137°W
- Area: 0.25 acres (0.10 ha)
- Open: 1980

Artesian Well Park is a small pocket park near downtown Salt Lake City, Utah, built around a natural artesian spring that flows without pumping. The park occupies a quarter acre at the southwest corner of 800 South and 500 East. The spring has been used as a public water source since at least the late 19th century and continues to attract visitors from across the Salt Lake Valley. The well is monitored by Salt Lake City's Department of Public Utilities and meets federal and state requirements for drinking water, although low levels of naturally occurring perchlorate have been detected at concentrations below those the U.S. Environmental Protection Agency has identified in past health-risk reviews as unlikely to warrant national regulation.

== History ==
Tradition holds that a natural spring at the site was used in the mid-19th century by Latter-day Saint settlers to water oxen hauling stone from the quarry in Little Cottonwood Canyon to the Salt Lake Temple construction site. The date when the artesian well itself was drilled is not recorded, but city documents suggest it may originate from the 1890s, when drought led Salt Lake City to explore alternative water sources beyond annual snowpack runoff.

Salt Lake City filed a water claim for the well in 1936, listing a priority date of 1890 and a flow range of 2–20 gallons per minute. For much of the 20th century, the city did not own the corner lot but maintained the well as a public courtesy. By the early 2000s, both the Deseret News and Salt Lake City Public Lands described the site as having supported continuous public use for more than a century, attracting visitors "rain or shine, day or night." Although the location has long historical use, the built elements of the modern park are not historic and were added during late-20th-century improvements.

Following the creation of Salt Lake City’s parks committee in the mid-1970s, one of its early initiatives was to acquire the lot and develop a formal public park. The park was dedicated on October 18, 1980, with approximately $79,450 (equivalent to $352,443 in 2025) invested in constructing a water feature and improving access. The well casing and plumbing were upgraded in 1984.

In 1987, the park received its current name through Salt Lake City’s “Name-the-Park” contest. The winning entry, “Artesian Well Park,” was submitted by Bernice Neeley, a Salt Lake Valley resident. a Salt Lake Valley resident. A humorous runner-up, “Barberi Park,” proposed by local disc jockey and columnist Tom Barberi, was noted by Mayor Palmer DePaulis as “running a close second,” with a quip that “both the well and the person run on freely.” At the time, the site was described as the only city park containing an artesian well. The contest was part of a broader effort to name several of Salt Lake City’s mini-parks.

A 2017 city survey of park users received 220 responses and found that nearly 80 percent lived outside the 84102 ZIP code, and almost one quarter had visited the well for more than a decade.

In late 2019, Salt Lake City began a major renovation project totaling $355,000, developed in partnership with the consulting firm IBI Group. Public engagement and design work began early that year, followed by construction later in 2019. Improvements included a redesigned well structure with 360-degree access, additional spigots, a high-capacity outlet for large containers, updated paving and landscaping, water-wise plantings, improved lighting, and better street visibility. The redesign also incorporated stormwater-management elements, including increased permeable surfaces beneath existing trees. During construction, residents were directed to another artesian spigot near the southeast corner of Liberty Park. A proposal by former city councilman Luke Garrott to rename the park in honor of community advocates W. Paul Wharton and Ethel C. Hale was considered but not adopted. The renovated park reopened to the public in September 2020.

== Water quality and safety ==
To ensure the water flowing from the spring is potable, Salt Lake City tests it weekly for coliform bacteria and monthly for perchlorate. Tests for metals and chemical contaminants like pesticides and herbicides are performed annually. Salt Lake City's 2023 Drinking Water Quality Report notes that the Artesian Well Park fountain is not part of the municipal drinking water system, but is routinely monitored for coliform, perchlorate, and other contaminants. Good4Utah had water from the spring independently tested, and found that the water did not contain pesticides, chlorine, fluoride, bacteria, arsenic, or lead. The Good4Utah test also showed that the water was relatively hard, containing a lot of calcium, magnesium, and iron. In 2007, the artesian spring water did test positive for perchlorate at a level of 4.6 parts per billion (ppb), which was below the EPA's guideline of 24.5 ppb. The safe level for perchlorate in drinking water is debated, with some states setting it at 200 ppb and others setting it at 1 ppb. For 2015-2016, Salt Lake City reported a perchlorate level in the water of 2-4 ppb.

In 2021, Salt Lake City temporarily shut down a separate artesian fountain at Liberty Park after routine testing detected coliform bacteria; city officials noted that the Liberty Park source is not part of the municipal drinking water system and directed visitors to use the Artesian Well Park fountain during the closure.

In 2025, the U.S. Environmental Protection Agency (EPA) reaffirmed that perchlorate concentrations detected in most U.S. drinking water systems, including levels comparable to those found at Artesian Well Park, do not currently warrant a national regulation under the Safe Drinking Water Act. However, following a federal court order, EPA is in the process of developing a proposed National Primary Drinking Water Regulation for perchlorate by November 2025, with a final rule scheduled for 2027.

== Water source ==
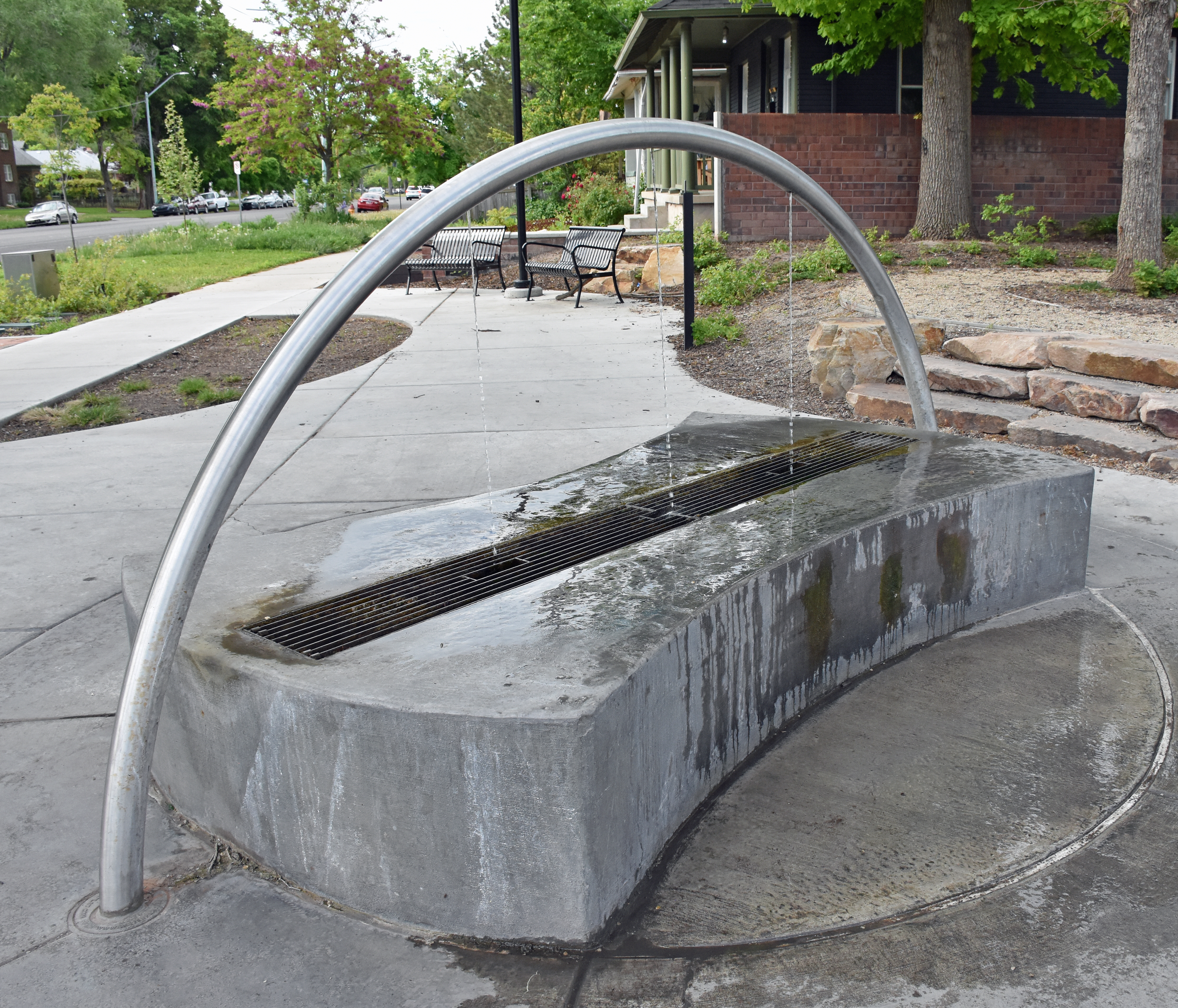
Arch containing the water spigots

According to Salt Lake City Public Lands, the well is supplied by an aquifer fed by a recharge area beginning near Red Butte Creek beneath the University of Utah. Earlier reporting from Salt Lake City's Department of Public Utilities indicated that water five blocks east of the spring can take about three years to reach the well and that water near the university may require more than a decade to percolate through the aquifer. The nearby Tracy Aviary in Liberty Park also contains natural springs.

A 2019 hydrogeologic study using environmental tracers and noble gas thermometry found that artesian springs in northeast Salt Lake Valley are primarily fed by young, valley-sourced recharge rather than deeper mountain-block groundwater. The study also identified Red Butte Creek as a likely “line-source” contributing to nearby springs, consistent with city reports that the Artesian Well Park source is recharged from the Red Butte aquifer system. One artesian well sampled in the study contained a mixture of modern and pre-modern groundwater.

== See also ==
- Liberty Park, another park in Salt Lake City with artesian well water
- Artesian Commons, a park in Olympia, Washington built in 2014 around an artesian spring
