= Maka Yusota =

- U.S. National Register of Historic Places
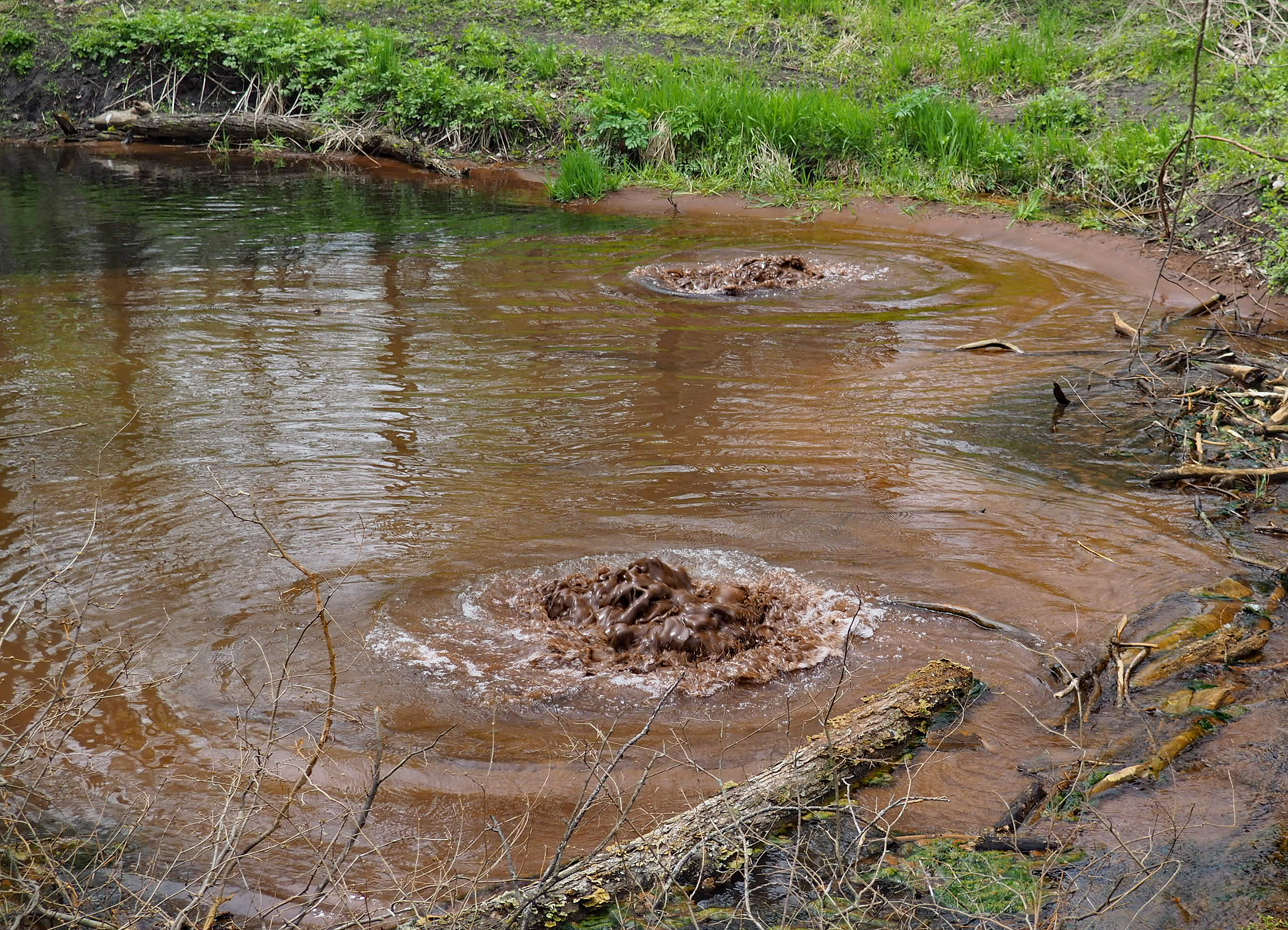
- Maka Yusota in mid-"boil"

- Location within Minnesota Location within the United States
- Nearest city: Savage, Minnesota
- Coordinates: 44°46′14″N 93°23′52″W
- NRHP reference No.: 02001703
- Added to NRHP: January 16, 2003

Maka Yusota (Boiling Springs) is a sacred site revered by the Dakota people, located in Savage, Minnesota, United States. The location features a pool of water over an artesian well that remains liquid year-round. A thick layer of fine sand sits on the bottom of the pool, which traps the spring water and releases it in bursts, creating an illusion of boiling water.
