= Batdorf & Bronson =

Coffee roaster

- Industry: Food products
- Founded: 1986 in Olympia, Washington
- Headquarters: Waterfront area, Olympia, Washington
- Area served: Olympia, Washington; Atlanta, Georgia; Washington, D.C. (retail presence); Worldwide via mail order
- Products: Coffee
- Brands: Dancing Goats
- Website: batdorfcoffee.com

Batdorf & Bronson is an Olympia, Washington-based coffee roaster established in 1986. Described by Lonely Planet as "Olympia's most famous coffee", and by Fodor's as "a local roaster that can stand up to the best of Seattle". The roastery operations are next door to the Olympia Farmer's Market in downtown Olympia.

As a member of the United States Environmental Protection Agency's Green Power Partnership, the company is operated on 100% renewable energy, the first U.S. coffee roaster to do so. Batdorf was awarded by the State of Washington for excellent environmental practices in 2002, and along with other Northwest entities who created the Western Washington Green Power Campaign, was awarded by the EPA in 2007 for their green energy promotion. Batdorf coffee is also triple-certified (Fairtrade, Rainforest Alliance shade-grown, and organic).

In 2015, the company announced it would be expanding retail operations to the Georgetown neighborhood of Washington, D.C. The company also had a second roasting operation in Atlanta and retail outlet in Decatur, Georgia as of 2004.

In 2022, the company rebranded its retail and wholesale products as Dancing Goats Coffee, retaining the name that was started in Olympia in 1988.

== Notable people ==
- Robert Frith Jr. went from Batdorf to starting a Vietnam coffee import/export company.
