= Artesian Commons =

Public park in Olympia, Washington, United States

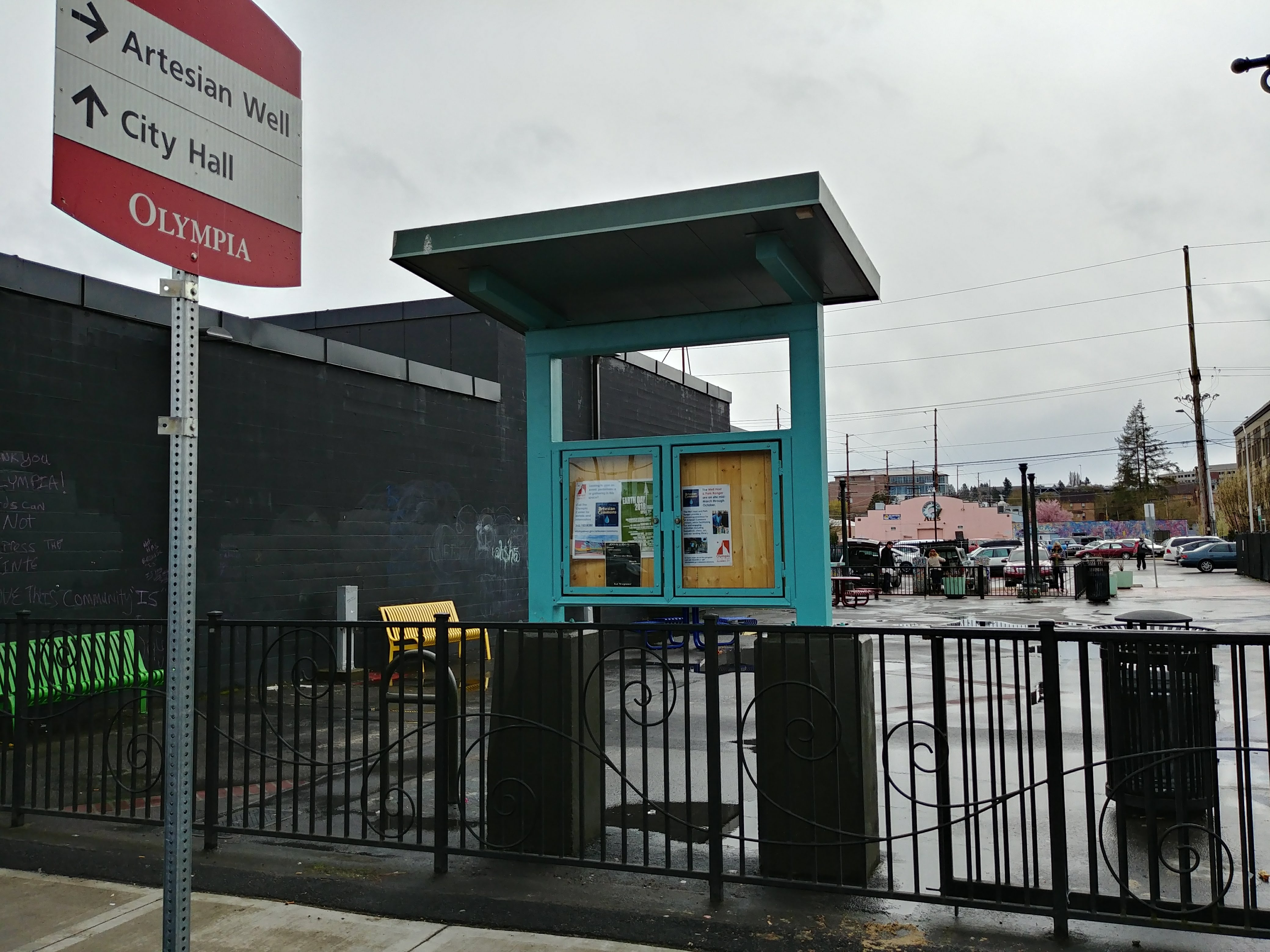
- Park entrance seen from 4th Avenue
- Interactive map of Artesian Commons
- Type: Municipal (Olympia)
- Location: 415 4th Ave SE; Olympia, Washington
- Coordinates: 47.0450°N 122.8972°W
- Area: 0.2 acres (810 m^{2})
- Created: May, 2014
- Operator: Olympia Parks Department
- Status: Closed

Artesian Commons is a 0.2-acre (0.081 ha) pocket park in downtown Olympia, Washington built in May 2014 around an artesian spring. It is described by the city as Olympia's first urban park. (Note: Sylvester Park in the Olympia Downtown Historic District is state-owned.)

Due to crime, the city closed the park in 2018. The artesian well and bathroom facilities remain accessible to the public.

== History ==
The free, public downtown artesian spring has long been used by Olympians for drinking water. Work to construct the Artesian Commons was begun by the city in 2010, purchasing the grounds and an adjoining parking lot. Construction began in March 2014 and the site officially opened after a ceremony held in May.

Outside of access to the artesinal well, the original plan for the commons was to create an "urban oasis" with access to food trucks and other merchants. Along with other springs in the area, water from the artesian well is used by several breweries, commercial businesses, and restaurants in the downtown core.

=== Crime and closure ===
The park has been a controversial site due to a "steady stream of problems", including homeless people sheltering at the site, as well as drug dealing, violence and other criminal activity. Crime was noted to increase 63% in the first year, with 44 arrests by early 2015. In 2016, the Olympia police department arrested 36 people.

The trash generated by park users is three quarters that in comparison to a 40-acre (16 ha) Olympia park, or 150 times greater on a per-acre basis. The park had a paid "well host", Army veteran Garrett Cooper, who acted as park ranger charged with enforcement. In order to keep the commons a safe place and to curb unruly behavior, a park ranger, Lee Wyatt, organized basketball games. In early 2016, the city applied some crime prevention through environmental design practices including fencing and lighting to deter unwanted behavior.

In August 2018, following four years of incidents including almost 1,400 calls for police at the park, it was permanently closed. Although shuttered, the public bathroom known as the Portland Loo, as well as the artesian well, remained accessible to the public. In closing the park, the city cited "violent incidents, verbal altercations, nuisance behaviors, and mental health emergencies"; the decision was also based on "unspecified threats against park employees". The closure was met with a protest that September; involving occupation of the park, participants were arrested for trespassing and for assaulting police.

In July 2026, the artesian well's outfall spout was damaged during a malicious mischief and car accident spree by one person in the downtown area. The man charged with the crime had previously stolen a brass fixture from the well earlier that day. Within two days, the well was repaired and considered operational.

As of 2026, the site is open to the public for the collection of artesian water.

=== Future plans ===
In September 2026, the city proposed the reopening of Artesian Commons, possibly reworking the site as a "mixed-use plaza". The proposals, based on focus group and resident feedback, included the removal of the fence that cordons off the grounds, or the construction of a replacement barrier. Several concerns over a reopening were noted, such as a return to higher crime levels, the decommissioning of the well due to contamination, or a permanent closure as damage done to the well could not be repaired. No timetable was provided on the reopening before the completion of design concepts and feasibility studies.

== Features ==
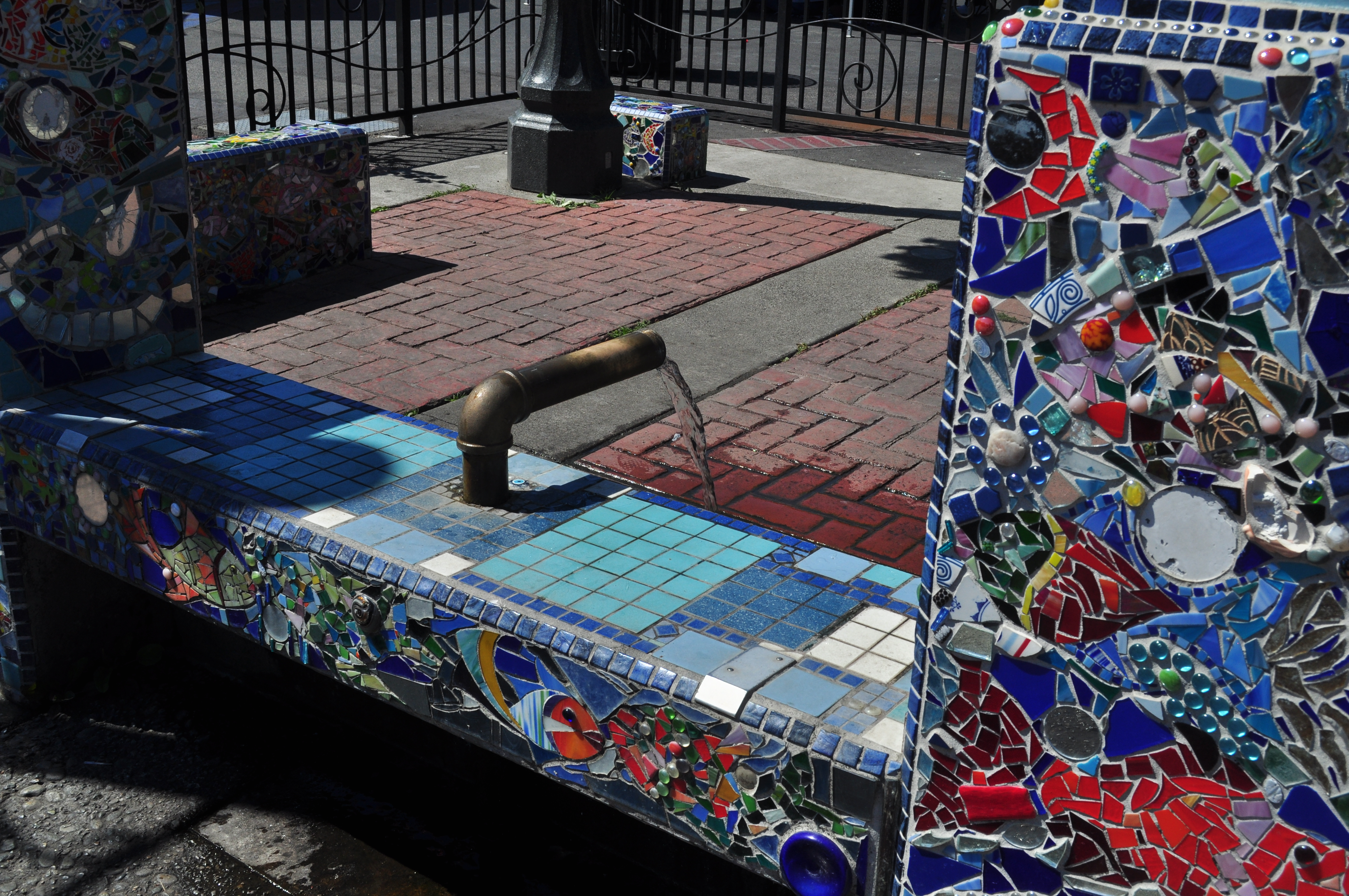

Also categorized as an urban park or pocket park, the 0.2-acre (0.081 ha) Artesian Commons is a public park that contains a well open to the public for consumption. The site was decorated with glass mosaic murals by local artist Jennifer Kuhns. In keeping the public art effort under budget, Kuhn asked local groups and volunteers to create mosaic fish which were adhered to the walls as part of the overall mural.

=== Folklore ===
An urban legend states that if one drinks artesian water from one of the over 90 artesian springs in Olympia, (Note: Downtown Olympia alone has 96 artesian wells) one will return to the city.

== Management ==
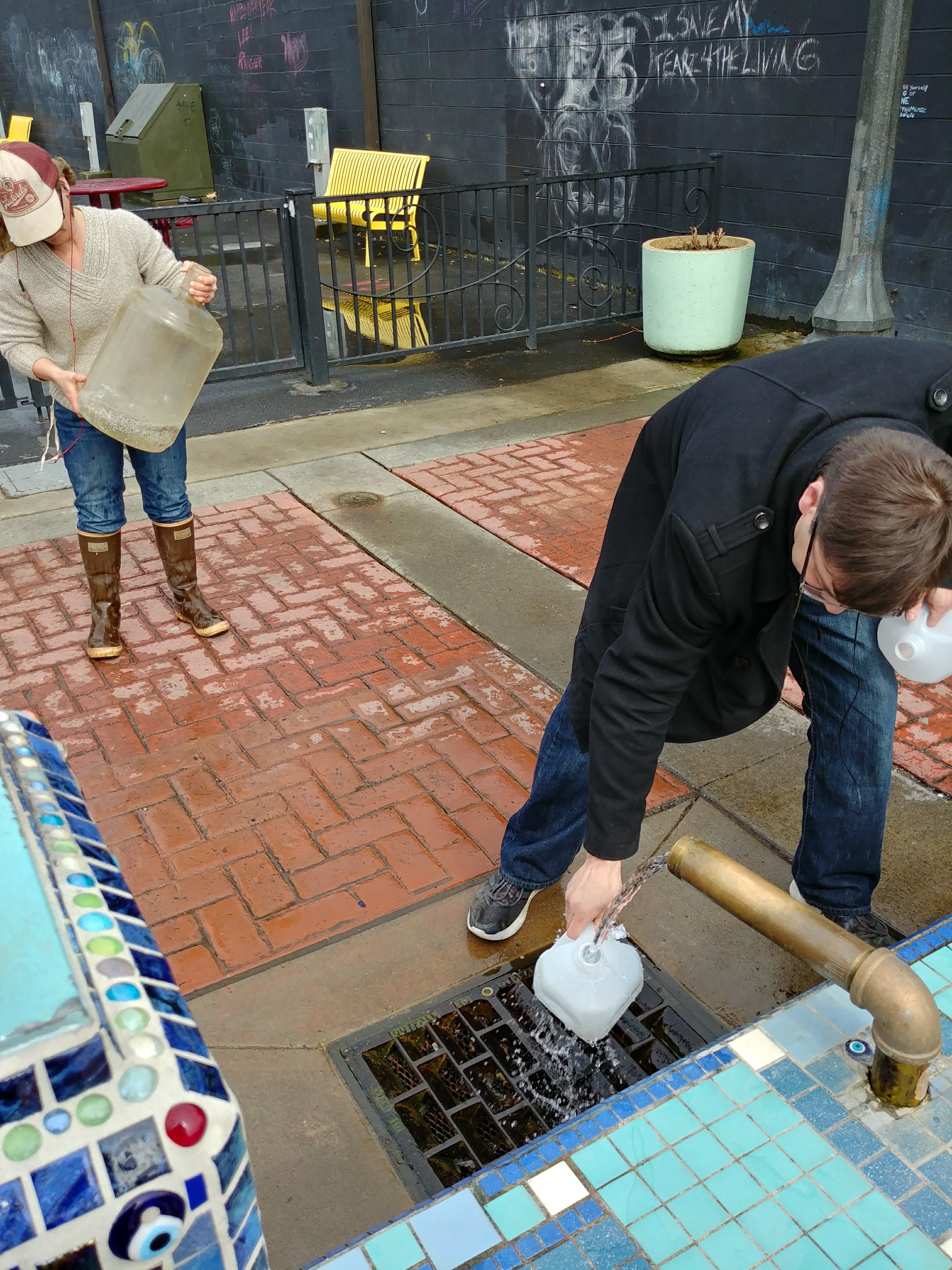
People filling water containers at the artesian well

Various local and government agencies partner to oversee the park, including the Artesian Leadership Committee which was formed in 2015. Artesian well water is tested by the city, along with the main city supplies at McAllister Wellfield (replacing McAllister Springs since the 2010s) and Allison Springs.

=== Drinking water supply ===
The public artesian well has a flow rate of 10 US gallons (38 L; 8.3 imp gal) per minute. A survey done by the city in 2016 recorded that approximately a third of visitors bottled more than 6 US gallons (23 L; 5.0 imp gal) per visit; approximately 70% mentioned that the commons was their main source of drinking water. About 15% of respondents were listed to visit daily, and 32% were recorded to frequent the well at least once per week.

Lead levels at the artesian spring in 2015 were less than 0.001 mg/L (the EPA action level is 0.015).

== See also ==
- Olympia, Washington § Artesian water
- Artesian Well Park, Salt Lake City
- History of Olympia, Washington
- Olympia Downtown Historic District
- Parks and recreation in Olympia, Washington
