= Olympia Brewery =

Historic brewery in Washington, United States

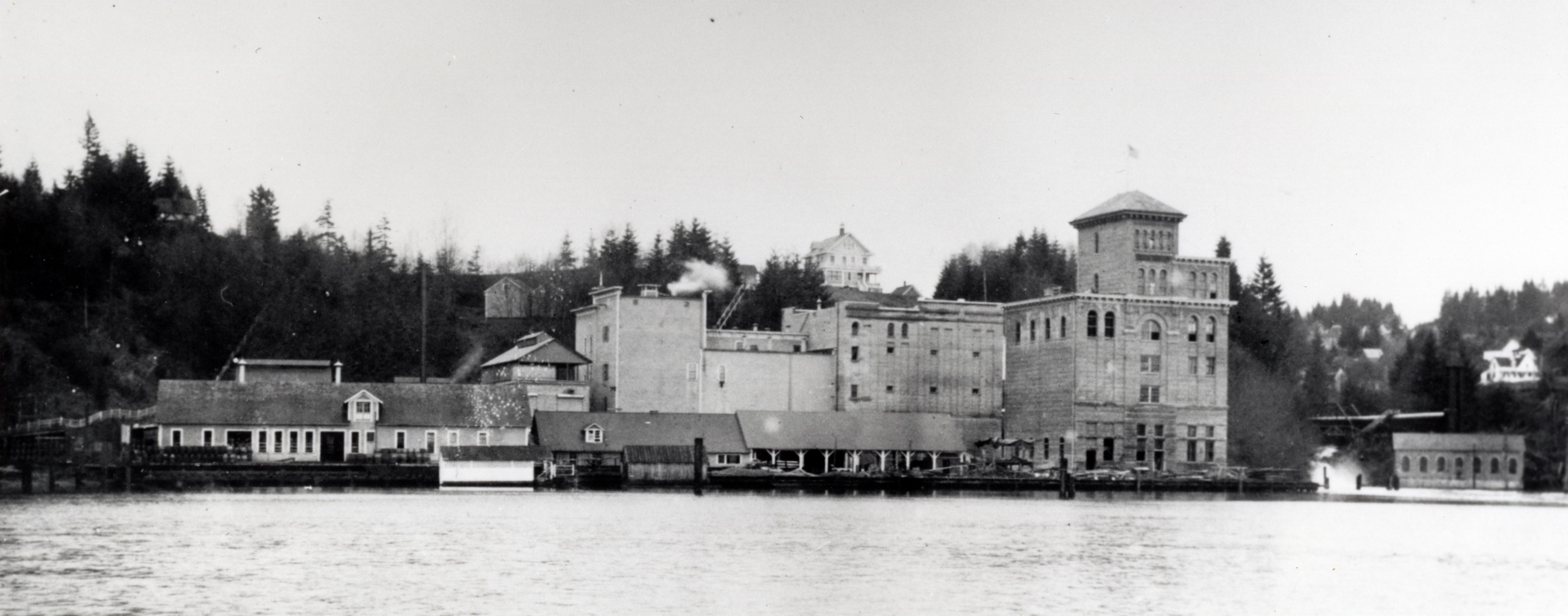
- Brewery c. 1906 – c. 1910
- Interactive map of Brewery location

General information
- Location: Tumwater, Washington, United States
- Coordinates: 47°01′16″N 122°54′10″W
- Construction started: 1906
- Completed: 1906

Technical details
- Size
- Olympia Brewery
- U.S. Historic district – Contributing property
- Location: Tumwater, Washington
- Part of: Tumwater Historic District (ID78002782)
- Added to NRHP: May 22, 1978

The 1906 Olympia Brewery, known locally as "the Old Brewery", is a historic brewery located at the base of Tumwater Falls in Tumwater, Washington. The brewery was once the manufacturing site for Olympia Beer. The original brewhouse is part of the Tumwater Historic District, listed on the National Register of Historic Places.

== History ==
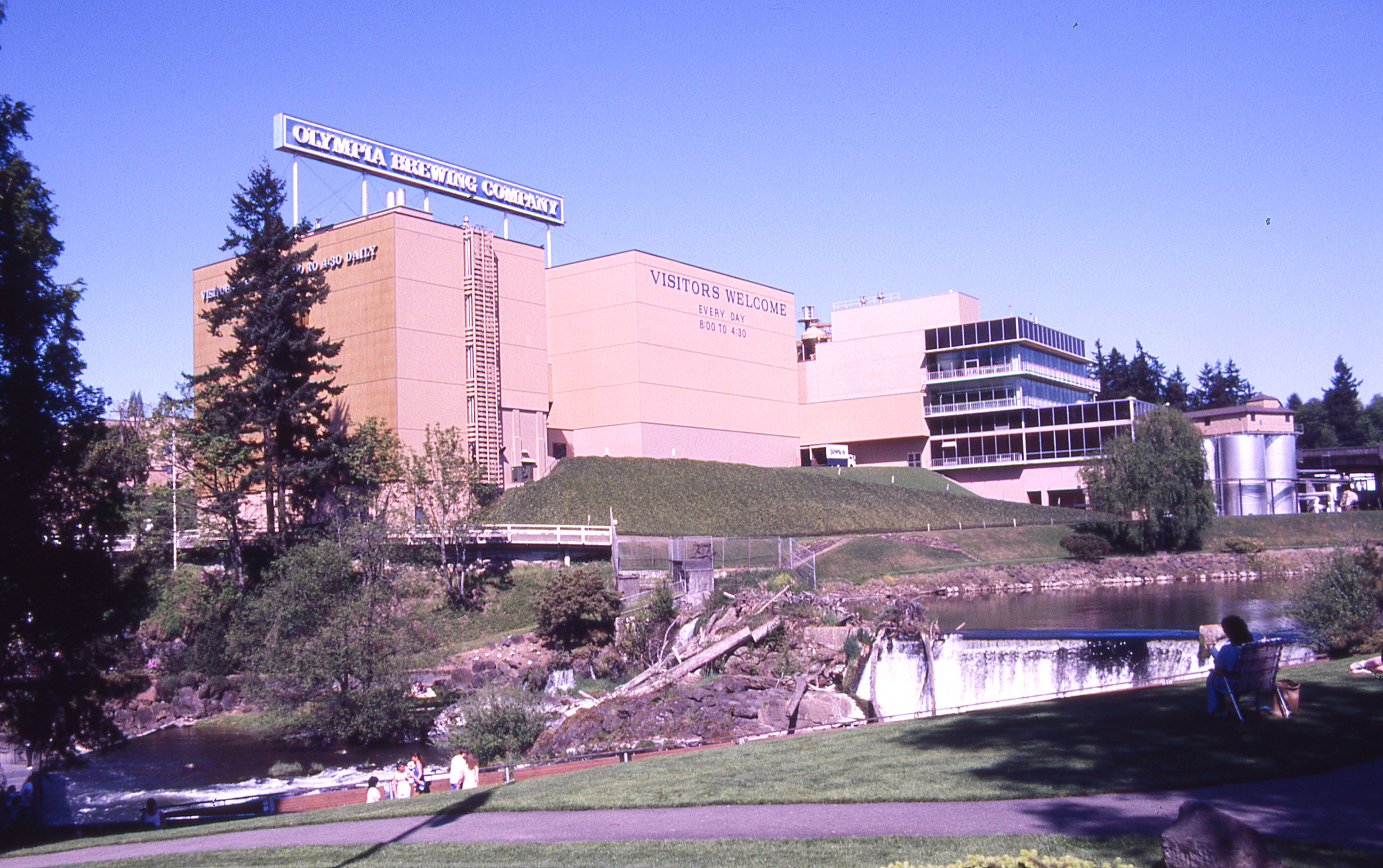
The new Olympia Brewery building in 1989.

The classic Mission Revival structure was designed by prominent local architect Joseph Wohleb. The brewery replaced the initial wooden plant constructed in 1896. The site was dedicated in 1906 and was shuttered at the advent of Prohibition. The redbrick structure has long served as a landmark for local residents and drivers along Interstate 5.

A new brewery was built in 1934, uphill from the original brewhouse. Brewing operations in a modern plant on the site ended in 2003.

The brewery has been for sale since the collapse of a real estate deal with a bottled water company in 2007. After condemning previous owners' water rights in April 2008, the cities of Lacey, Olympia and Tumwater took possession of water rights once held by the former Olympia Brewing Company.

=== October 2018 fire ===
On the early morning of October 8, 2018, the Tumwater Fire Department responded to the Olympia Brewery Complex for a reported structure fire. The fire had fully engulfed the building that formerly housed the brewery offices. Part of the building collapsed as the crews extinguished the fire. There was no immediate word on the cause of the fire. Later reporting suggested the cause was due to people attempting to remove copper wiring or by squatters who were inhabiting the building, setting fires for warmth. The building still had some electrical currents which sparked a flame.

=== February 2019 oil spill ===
On February 27, 2019, the Washington State Department of Ecology reported an oil spill from a vandalized 700-gallon capacity transformer on the brewery property. An estimated 587 gallons of oil containing toxic polychlorinated biphenyl spilled into the Deschutes River. The clean-up occurred over six months and involved the Department of Ecology, Department of Enterprise Services, Washington Conservation Corps, and Cowlitz Clean Sweep, contracted by the brewery owners. Oil-contaminated vegetation and sediment was removed from Capitol Lake and Brewery Park at Tumwater Falls. Tumwater Development, LLC, the owners of the site, were made to pay a $14,000 penalty and $2.25 million clean-up reimbursement cost to the state.

== See also ==
- Olympia Brewing Company
- History of Olympia, Washington
- Tumwater, Washington
