= TULIP Cooperative Credit Union =

Logo of TULIP Cooperative Credit Union, from their Facebook page

TULIP Cooperative Credit Union, founded in 2001, was a cooperative financial institute located in Olympia, Washington serving the residents of Thurston County, Washington. The name is an acronym for Thurston Union of Low Income People. TULIP Cooperative Credit Union opened in 2003 and merged with the larger Harborstone Credit Union on September 1, 2016.
