= Artesian Water Co. Pumphouse and Wells =

- U.S. National Register of Historic Places
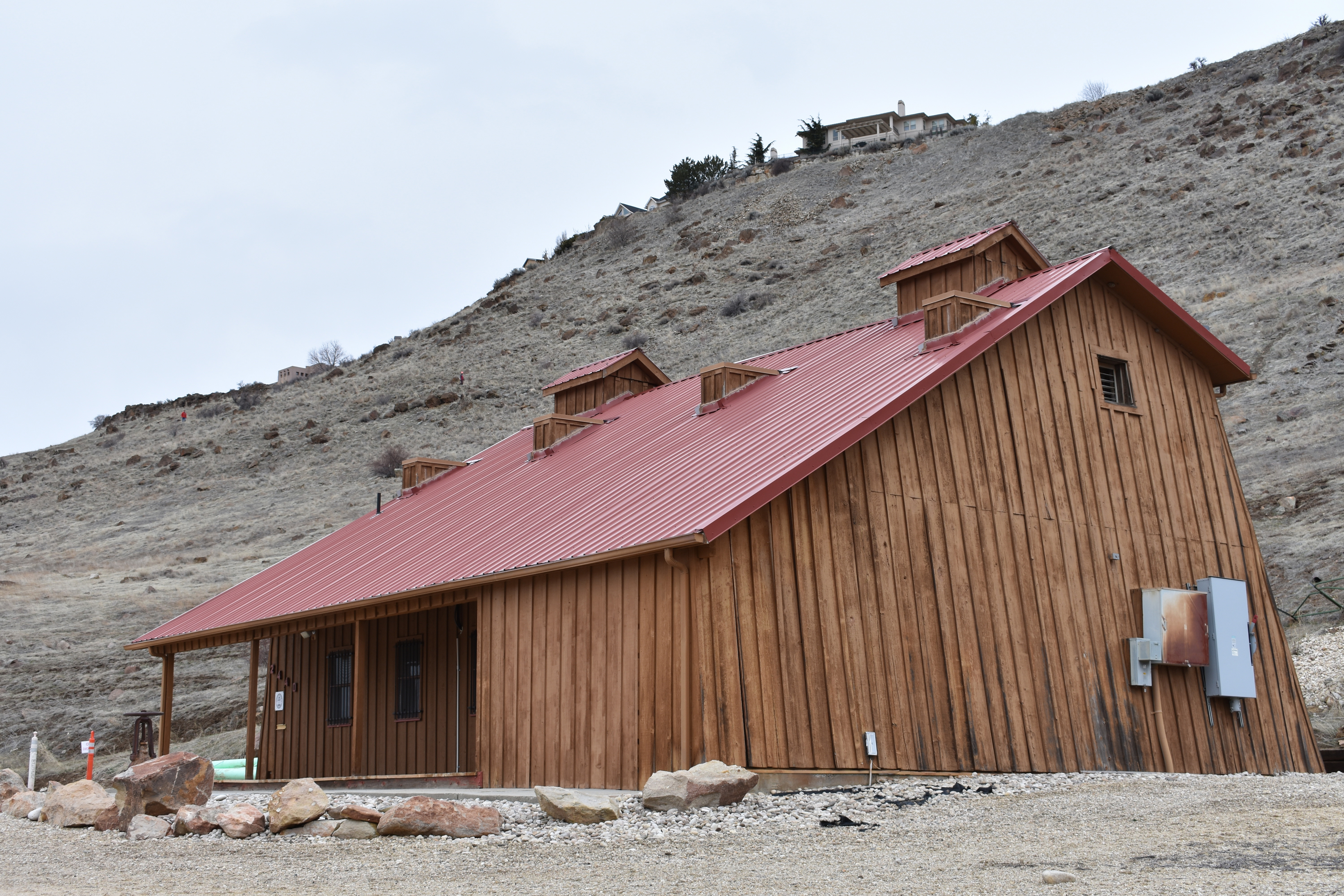
- The Artesian Water Co. Pumphouse in 2019

- Location within Idaho Location within the United States
- Location: Off ID 21, Boise, Idaho
- Coordinates: 43°36′16″N 116°09′46″W
- Area: less than one acre
- Built: 1890
- NRHP reference No.: 79000763
- Added to NRHP: July 26, 1979

The Artesian Water Co. Pumphouse and Wells in Boise, Idaho, United States, houses two pumps that circulate geothermally heated water from wells installed in 1890. Natural hot water from the pumphouse was piped to residential and commercial customers beginning in the 1890s. The rectangular building, 27 ft (8.2 m) X 50 ft (15 m), has battered walls that conform to the inward slope of two drill derricks which supported the original structure.

== History ==
In 1887 dairy owner Frank Davis began drilling artesian wells on a ranch owned by his brother, Tom Davis, at Crane Gulch. The Davis brothers intended to supply water to Boise City, but their plan was not successful.

In 1888 Boise City pioneers Christopher W. Moore, Nathan Falk, and John Broadbent began promoting a plan to fund an artesian water company. The Boise Water Works was organized in 1890 with $200,000 in capital stock, with directors George L. Shoup, William H Ridenbaugh, Christopher W. Moore, Timothy Reagan, Peter Sonna, Alfred Eoff, George Ainslie, Richard Z. Johnson, and Hosea B. Eastman. Also in 1890, the Artesian Water and Land Improvement Company began to provide water for the city. Officers of the company were David Heron, Auren G. Redway, Samuel H. Hays, Nathan Falk, John Case, Lazare Weil, and Frank R. Coffin. After a dispute over city hydrant contracts, the two water works merged in 1891 to form the Artesian Hot and Cold Water Company, with Christopher W. Moore as president. Moore was the first residential customer of the company, and his home, now the Moore-Cunningham House, on Warm Springs Avenue was the first house in the United States to be heated geothermally. The company also provided hot water to Boise's Natatorium (1892-1934).

The two wells covered by the pumphouse were operating by 1891. They were sunk 32 ft (9.8 m) apart using 6 in (150 mm) pipe about 400 ft (120 m) deep. Water mains were made of iron strapped pine wood from Puget Sound. The wells provided a combined water flow of 1,600,000 gallons per day at a temperature of about 170 °F (77 °C).

In 1892 the Artesian Hot and Cold Water Company published a list of rules and regulations. The company's public policy was formed before water was metered, and domestic customers were charged by the number of rooms in their houses, and "no person or family shall be permitted to furnish water to stone masons, bricklayers, or plasterers..." Barbers were charged $1.00 per month, and butchers were charged $2.00.

The Boise Warm Springs Water District now manages the pumphouse and wells.
