= Olympia Brewing Company =

Former brewery in Tumwater, Washington, USA

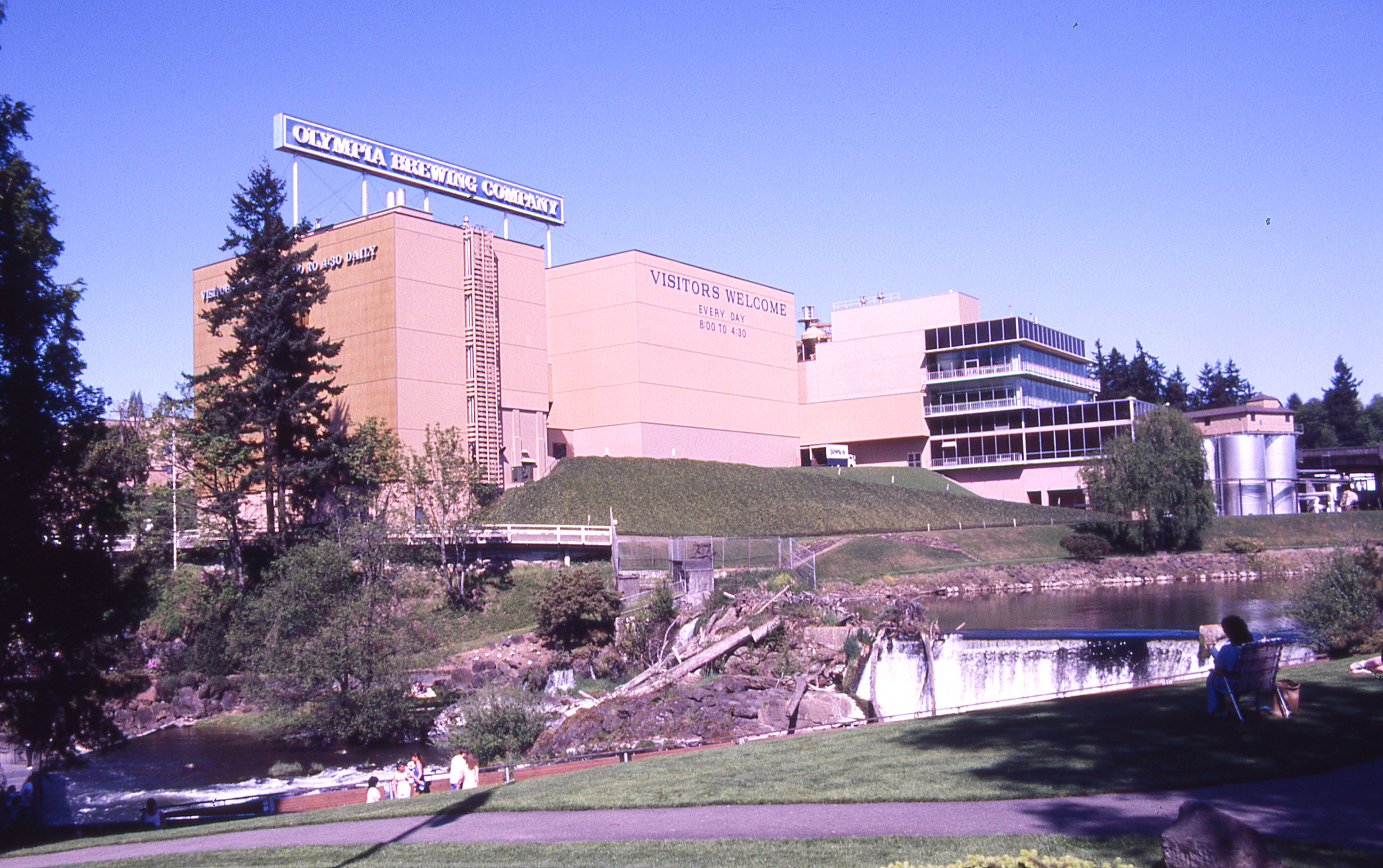
- Tumwater brewery in 1989
- Industry: Alcoholic beverage
- Founded: 1896, 130 years ago in Tumwater, Washington
- Founder: Leopold Friederich Schmidt
- Defunct: 2003, 23 years ago
- Headquarters: Los Angeles, California
- Products: Beer
- Owner: Pabst Brewing Company
- Website: olympia-beer.com

The Olympia Brewing Company was a brewery which operated at the Olympia Brewery in Tumwater, Washington. It was founded in 1896 by Leopold Friederich Schmidt and bought by Pabst Brewing Company in 1983. Through a series of consolidations due to the failure of the Stroh Brewing Company, the Tumwater Brewery was acquired by Miller Brewing Company in 1999. The Tumwater brewery was closed by SABMiller in 2003 citing excess capacity in their system, and the higher cost of operating a small brewery.

== History ==
=== Founding ===
Leopold Schmidt, a German immigrant from Deer Lodge, Montana founded The Capital Brewing Company at Tumwater Falls on the Deschutes River in the town of Tumwater, near the south end of Puget Sound.

Schmidt and his brother Louis built a four-story wooden brewhouse, a five-story cellar building, a one-story ice factory powered by the lower falls, and a bottling and keg plant. After sampling two containers of water from the Deschutes River with the Whal-Henius Institute, Schmidt declared, "with this water, I believe I can brew better beer than ever" and in 1896, began brewing and selling Olympia Beer.

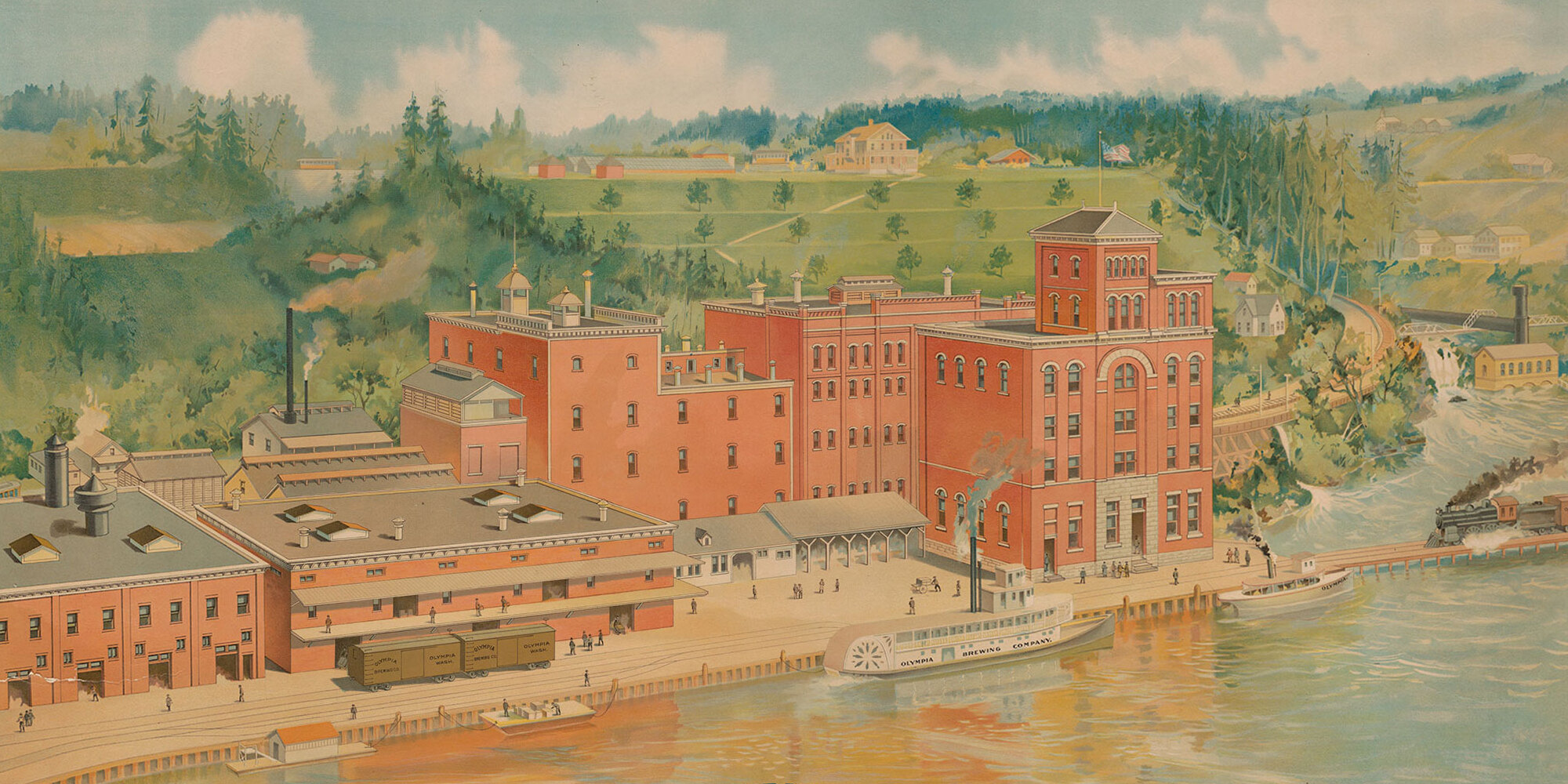
Illustration from Olympia Brewing Company, c. 1890

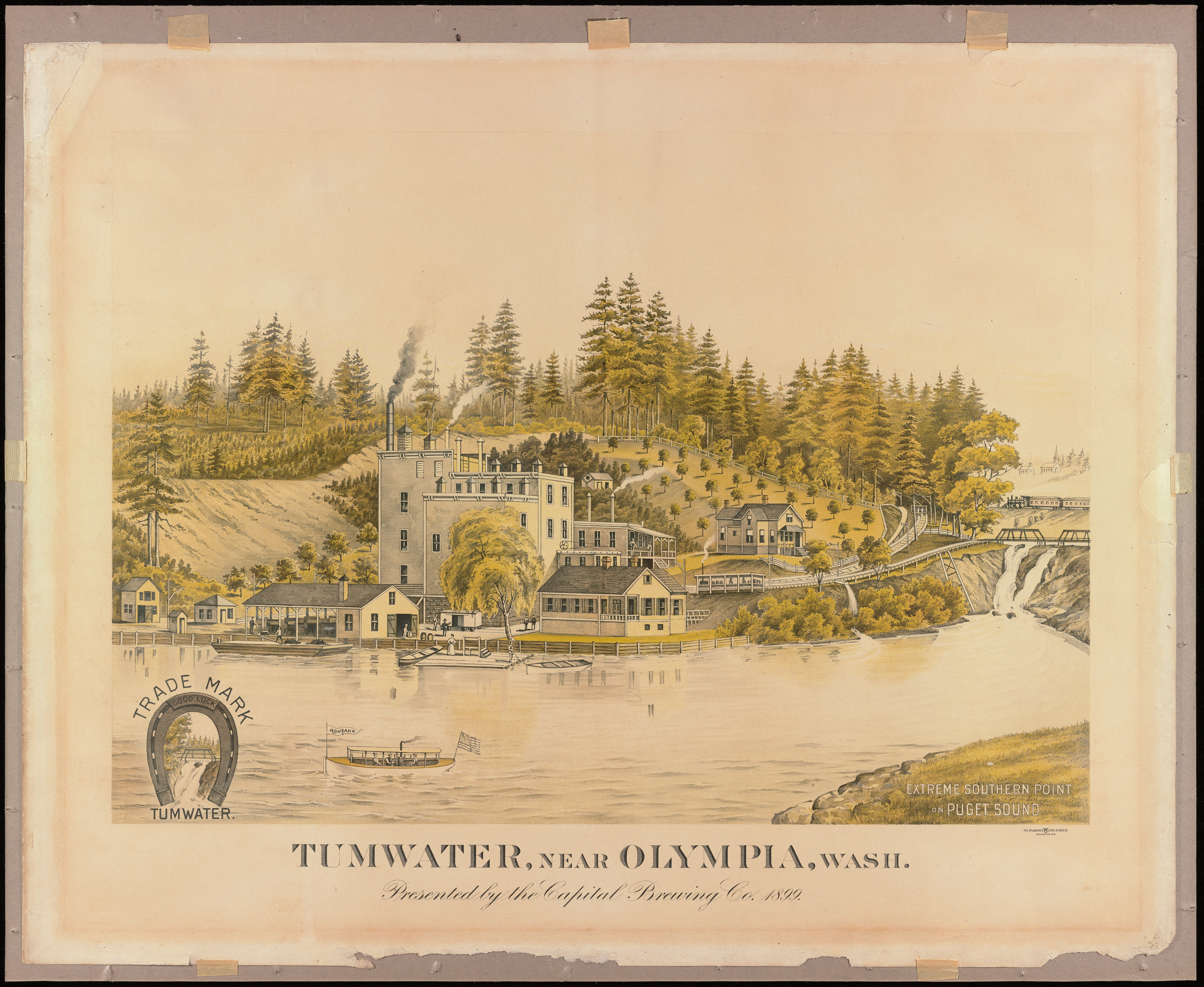
Illustration from Olympia Brewing Company, c. 1899

=== 20th century ===
In 1902, the brewery was renamed to Olympia Brewing Company, with Frank Kenney as the Company Secretary. It was Frank Kenney who proposed the slogan "It's the Water" to promote the brewery's flagship product.

In 1909, the company was considered the principal industry in Tumwater and estimated to have over 100 employees with a $100,000 annual payroll.

Leopold Schmidt died in 1914 and brewing operations stopped in 1915, allowing a year to deplete inventory and dismantle operations before the Statewide Prohibition, which began in January 1916 (four years before National Prohibition).

After the Prohibition ended, a new Olympia Brewery (47.0155°N 122.9035°W) was erected just upstream from the original, and Olympia beer went back on sale in 1934. Operations at the new brewhouse were powered by a substation on the grounds.

Olympia was a very popular regional brand in the Pacific Northwest for half of a century. It eventually expanded nationwide, repositioned as a low-price lager. During the 1970s, Olympia acquired Hamm's and Lone Star. The brewery also produced Buckhorn Beer, which had previously been a product of the Lone Star Brewing Company. Until the mid-1970s, competitor Coors of Colorado had a limited 11-state distribution area; Washington and Montana were not added until 1976, and Oregon did not approve sales of Coors in grocery stores until 1985.

Between 1970 and 1980 Olympia faced flat revenues among consolidating nationwide breweries and, in 1982, the Schmidt family, which owned and operated the brewery and company, elected to sell the company. Olympia was subsequently purchased by Pabst Brewing Company in 1983 through a stock swap. The G. Heileman Brewing Company purchased Lone Star Beer and other brands from Pabst. The Stroh Brewing Company put itself up for sale in 1999; Pabst bought most of the Stroh brands along with Miller Brewing Company. The Miller Brewing Company subsequently sold the Olympia Brewery in Tumwater.

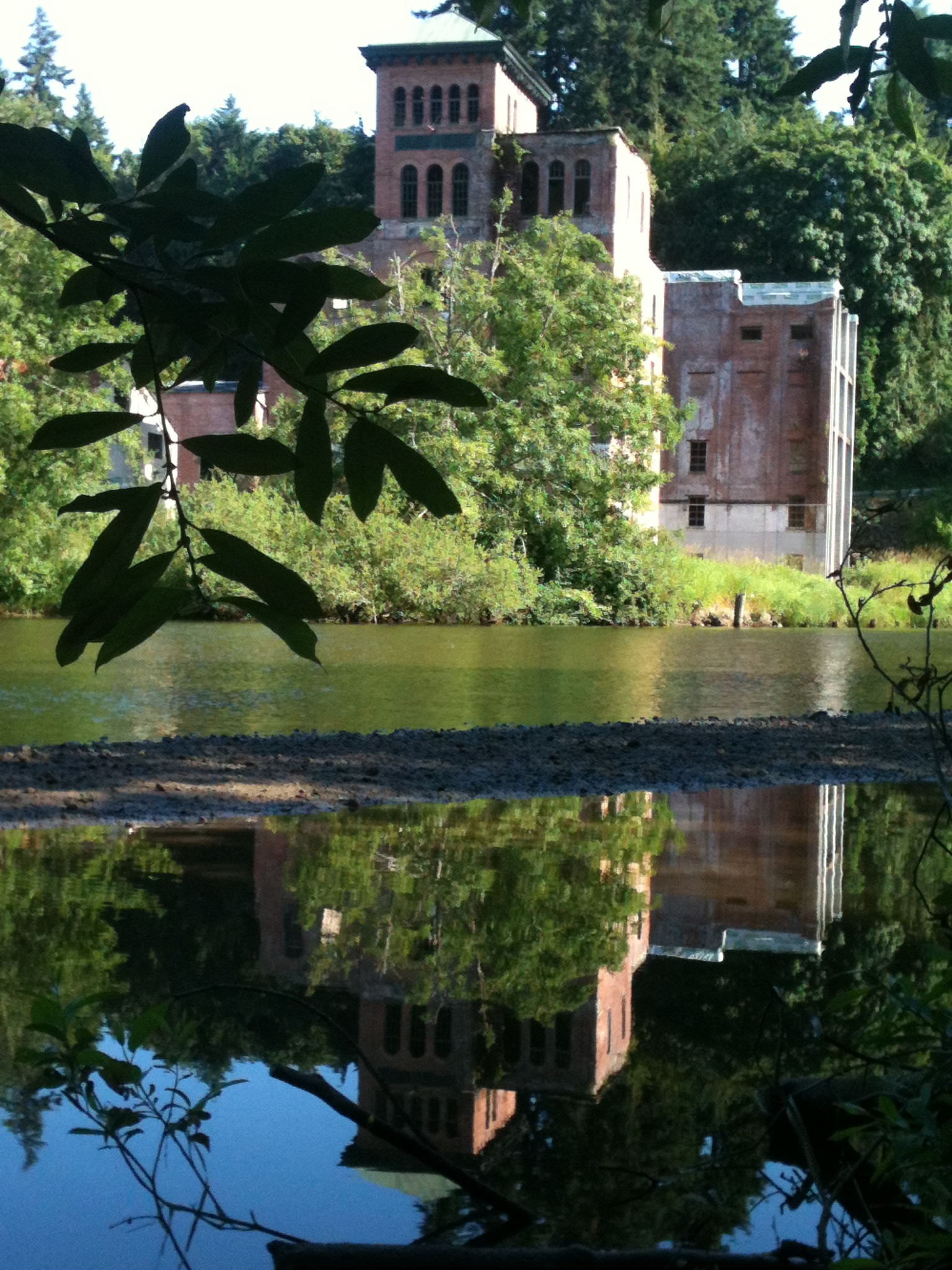
The old Tumwater brewery building, 2012

The old Olympia brewery in Tumwater, 2018

=== 21st century ===
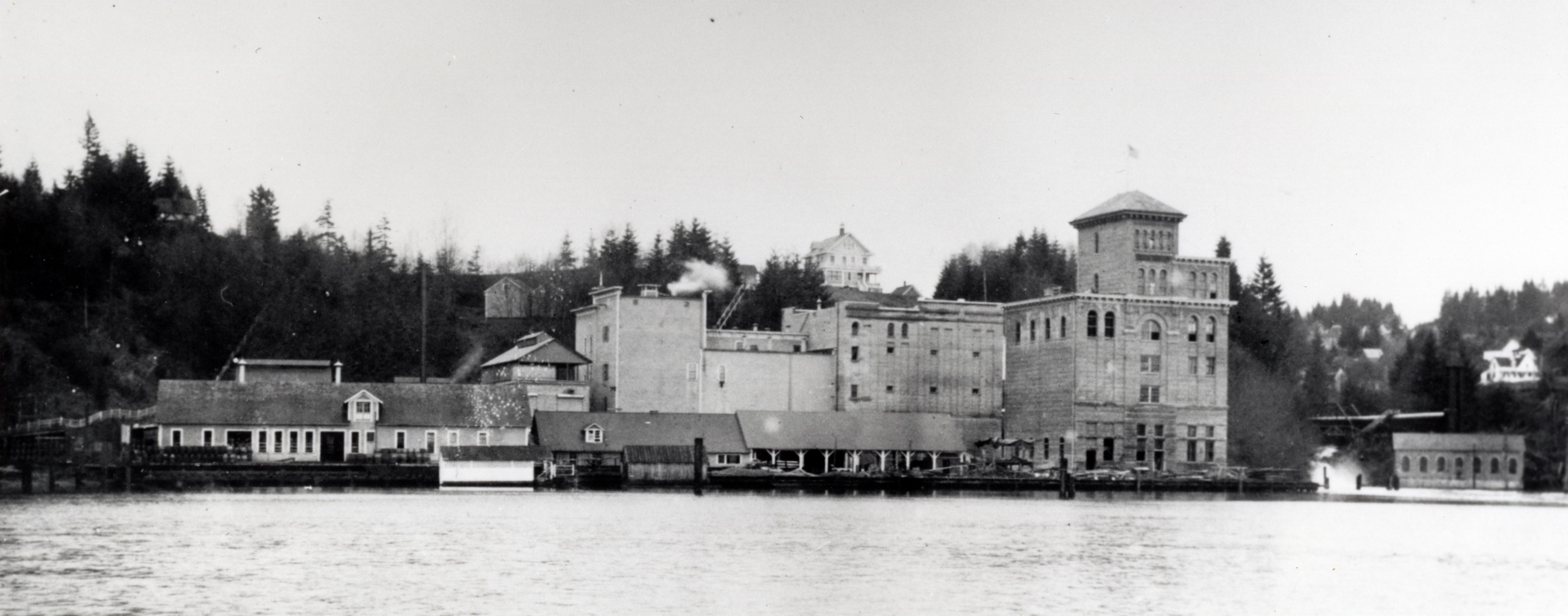
The brewery, c. 1906-1910

The brewery was eventually purchased by Miller Brewing Company. For a time, the Olympia brewery took over the brewing of other Pacific Northwest brands as their original breweries were closed one by one, including the Lucky Lager brewery in Vancouver, Washington, the Henry Weinhard's brewery in Portland, and even the brewery of its arch-rival, Rainier Beer, in Seattle. In 2002, SAB bought out Miller Brewing Co.; SABMiller closed the Tumwater facility in June 2003, citing the unprofitability of such a small brewery.

Pabst was purchased, along with the Olympia label, by beer industry veteran Eugene Kashper with backing from TSG Consumer Partners in 2014, and Olympia Beer was brewed under contract by MillerCoors at their brewery in Irwindale, California. Ag Energy Resources of Benton, Illinois purchased the machinery from Olympia Brewing to make ethanol for motor fuel use.

On January 25, 2021 Pabst Brewing Company announced on Twitter that it was "temporarily pausing production" of Olympia Beer because of a lack of demand and to focus attention on its distilled spirit line under the Olympia Distilling Company brand.

As of 2026, Olympia Beer is produced in Saskatoon, Saskatchewan by Great Western Brewing.

=== Closure of brewery ===
The 1934 Olympia Brewery, situated on 100 acres (40 ha) on Custer Way in Tumwater, was shuttered in 2003 and the campus has since remained in a "derelict" state. The site was privately purchased in 2016 and by the 2020s, the site was described as "depressing", "unsightly" and an "eyesore".

Part of the brewery complex was heavily damaged in a fire on October 7, 2018. The administration building's south side partially collapsed, and a 3-alarm fire call caused fire units to respond from many neighboring departments. An oil leak from the brewery contaminated nearby Deschutes River in 2019; the city fined the owner and a settlement was agreed to with the state.

Local citizens and the city of Tumwater have suggested several proposals to convert the site for various uses, including reopening the facility for another brewery. As the campus resides in what is known as the "Brewery District", additional suggestions include converting the buildings into a commercial and residential mixed-use complex, as part of the district. Possible contamination at the brewery has prevented any actions to convert the grounds for other use. Eminent domain has been suggested, but the city found the costs to be prohibitive.

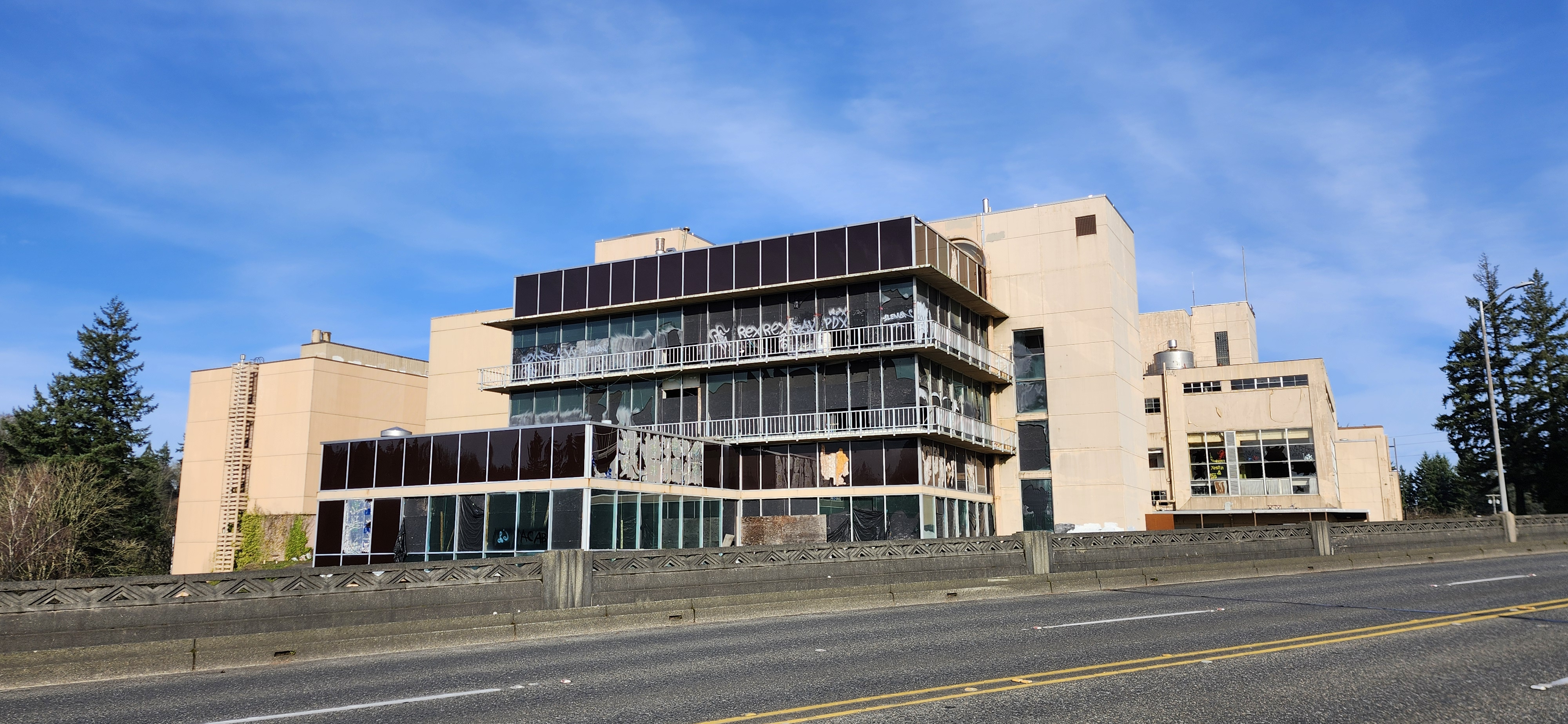
Derelict Olympia Brewery building, 2026

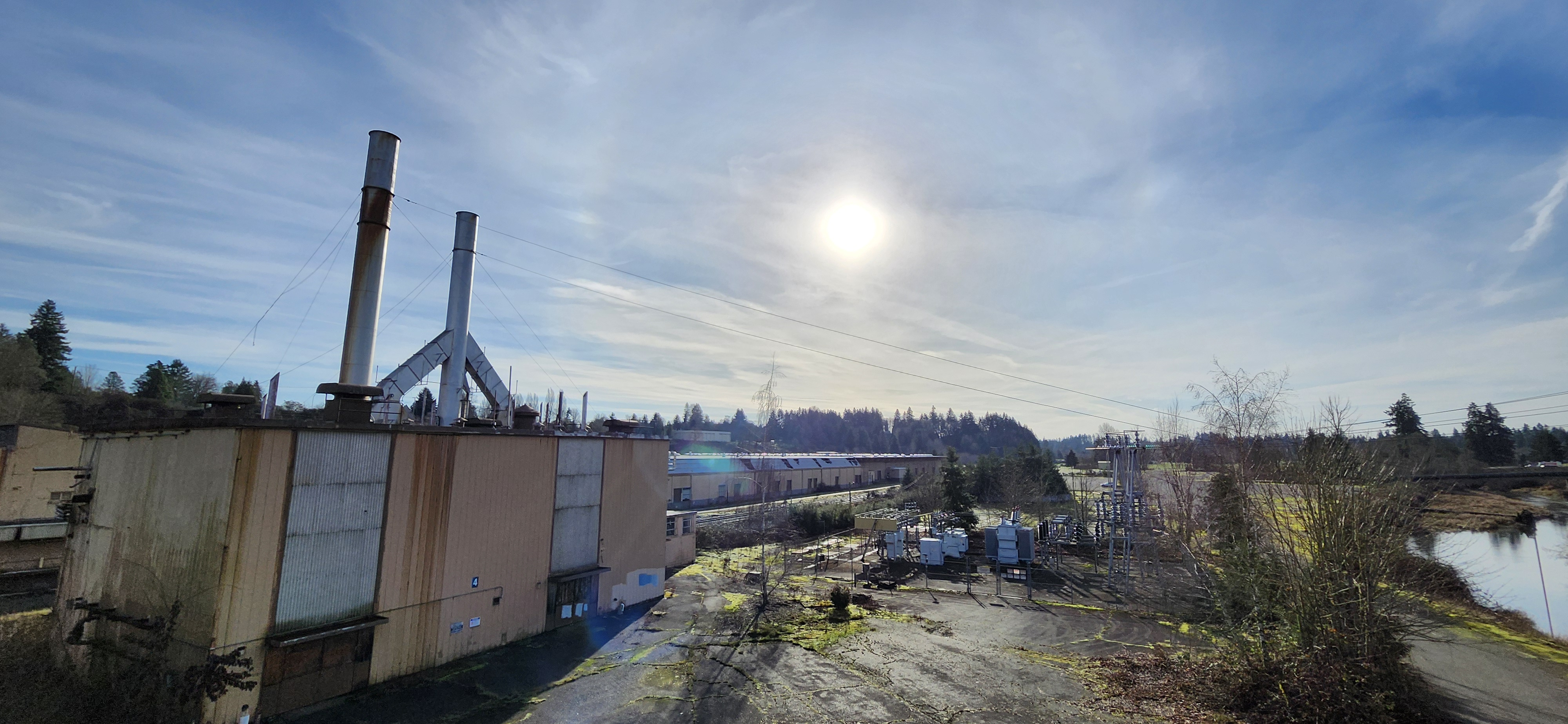
Abandoned production site, 2026

== Use of artesian water ==
For many years, Olympia Beer was brewed with water obtained from artesian wells. The company's promotions made much of the use of artesian water in the brewing process. One later advertising campaign, rather than explaining what artesian water was, claimed the water was controlled by a mythical population of "artesians". Once the brewery was taken over by a larger company, the use of artesian water was discontinued, and so was that advertising campaign.

In downtown Olympia, current efforts to preserve the use of artesian water at one of the remaining public wells has been the mission of H2Olympia: Artesian Well Advocates.

== In popular culture ==
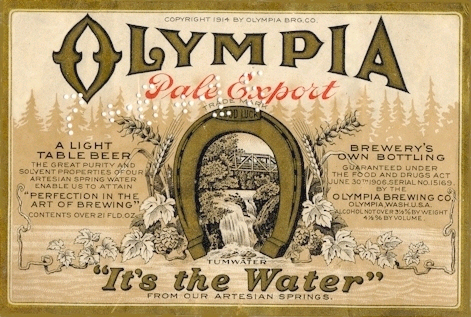
Olympia Beer label from 1914

Daredevil Evel Knievel was sponsored by Olympia Beer. Olympia paid to have Evel sew patches onto his jackets, signs on his vehicles, even stitching "Olympia Beer" onto parachutes attached to his dragster.

The second word in American rock band Creedence Clearwater Revival's name is derived from an Olympia advertising campaign.

Olympia Beer was praised as one of the top 25 beers in the world in a 2012 MensJournal.com review article.

== See also ==
- History of Olympia, Washington
- List of defunct breweries in the United States
