= Green Power Partnership =

Voluntary program of the US Environmental Protection Agency

The United States Environmental Protection Agency's Green Power Partnership is a voluntary program that supports the organizational procurement of green power by offering expert advice, technical support, tools, and resources. It provides public health and environmental benefits by expanding U.S. renewable energy markets through the voluntary use of green power.

The EPA defines 'green power' as a subset of renewable energy and "represents those renewable energy resources and technologies that provide the highest environmental benefit", with electricity produced from solar, wind, geothermal, biogas, biomass, and low-impact small hydroelectric sources listed as types of green power.

== Communities ==
Green Power Communities are defined by the United States Environmental Protection Agency (EPA) as "towns, villages, cities, counties, or tribal governments in which the local government, businesses, and residents collectively buy green power in amounts that meet or exceed EPA's Green Power Community purchase requirements."

== See also ==
- List of U.S. states by electricity production from renewable sources
- List of countries by electricity production from renewable sources
