= Artesian well =

Naturally-pressurized water source

Artesian aquifer scheme: 1. Aquifer; 2. Impervious strata; 3. Infiltration area; 4. Artesian well; 5. Saturation level; 6. Subartesian well; 7. Artesian spring

Geological strata giving rise to an artesian well

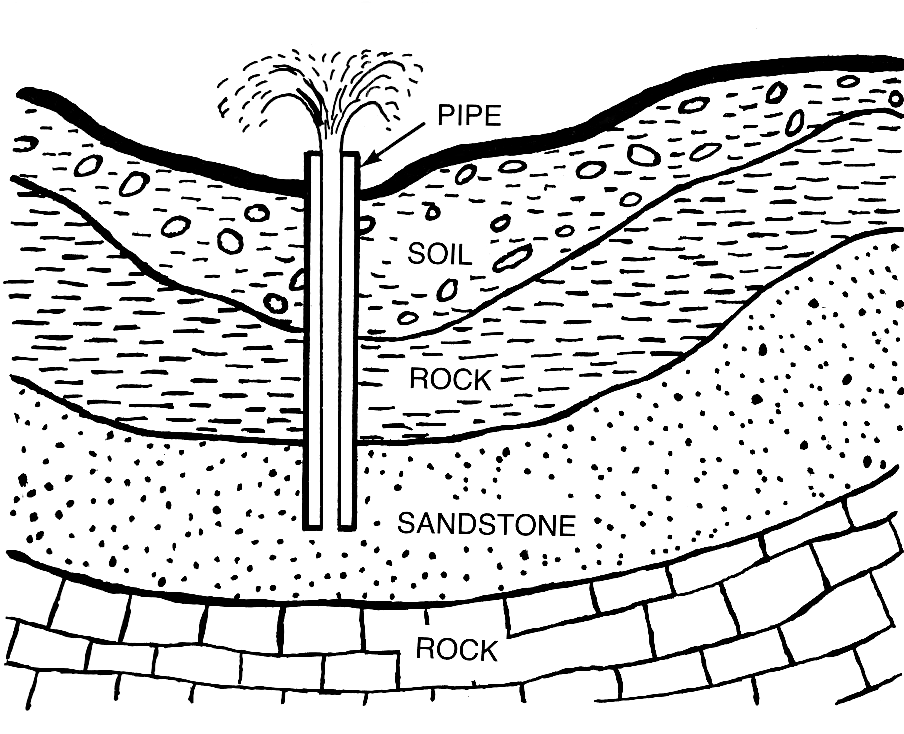
Schematic of an artesian well

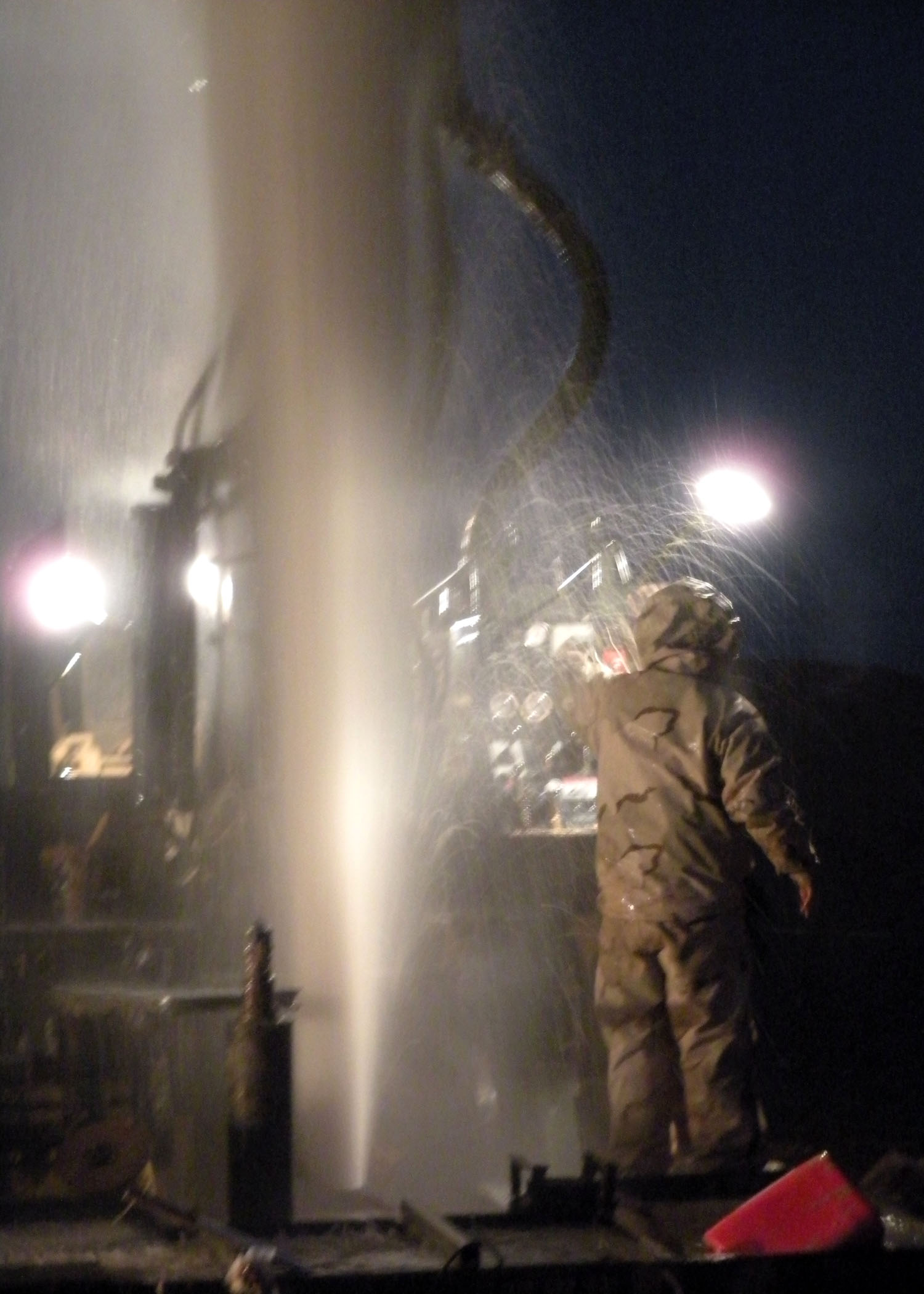
U.S. Navy Seabees tapping an artesian well in Helmand Province, Afghanistan

An artesian well is a well that brings groundwater to the surface without pumping because it is under pressure within a body of rock or sediment known as an aquifer. When trapped water in an aquifer is surrounded by layers of impermeable rock or clay, which apply positive pressure to the water, it is known as an artesian aquifer. If a well were to be sunk into an artesian aquifer, water in the well-pipe would rise to a height corresponding to the point where hydrostatic equilibrium is reached.

A well drilled into such an aquifer is called an artesian well. If water reaches the ground surface under the natural pressure of the aquifer, the well is termed a flowing artesian well.

Fossil water aquifers can also be artesian if they are under sufficient pressure from the surrounding rocks, similar to how many newly tapped oil wells are pressurized.

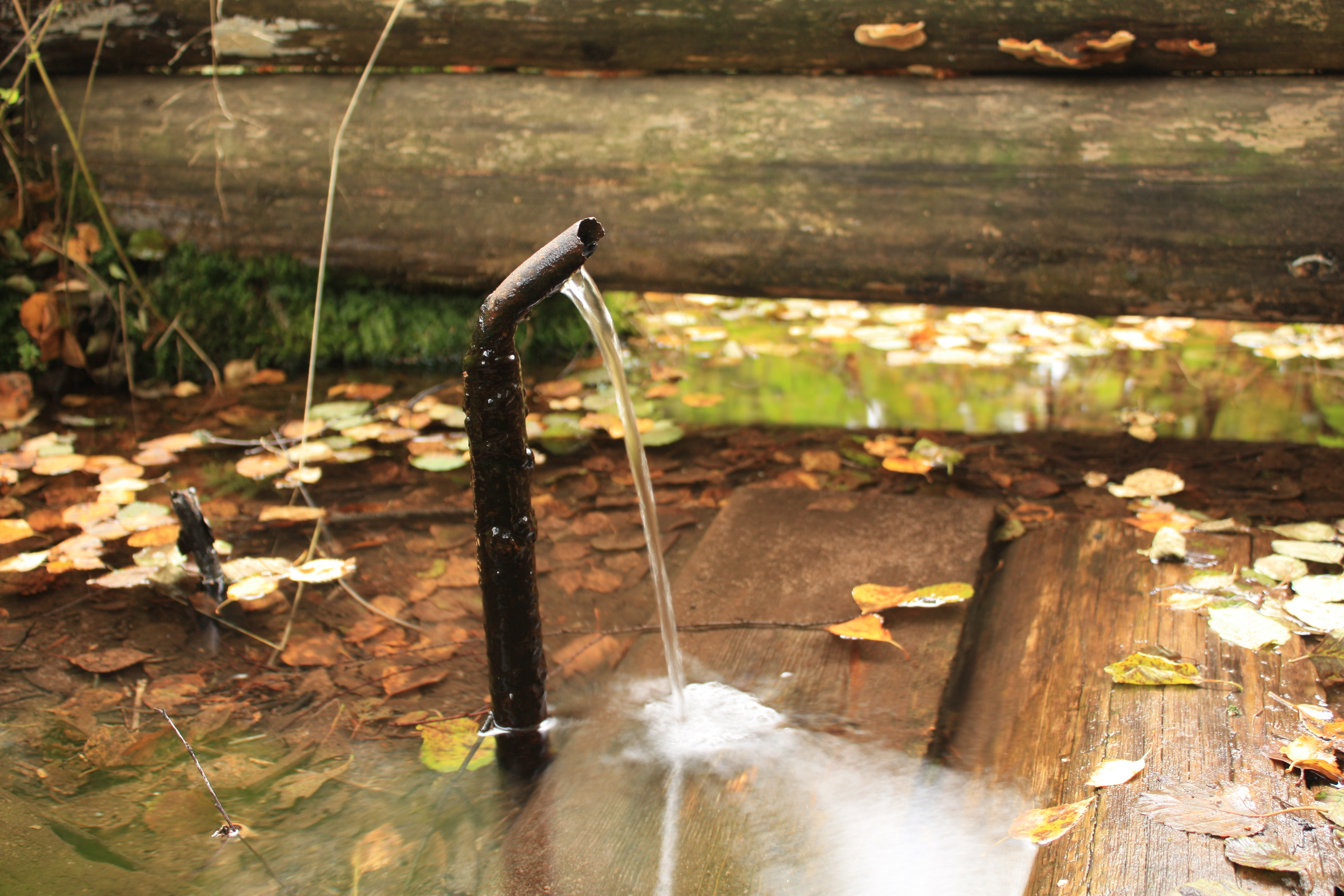
Artesian well near the Myllylähde spring in Alastaro, Finland

Not all aquifers are artesian (i.e., water table aquifers occur where the groundwater level at the top of the aquifer is at equilibrium with atmospheric pressure). Aquifers recharge when the water table at its recharge zone is at a higher elevation than the head of the well.

== History ==
The first mechanically accurate explanation for artesian wells was given by Al-Biruni. Artesian wells were named after Artois in France, where many artesian wells were drilled by Carthusian monks from 1126.

== See also ==
- Fluid mechanics
- Great Artesian Basin
- Hydrogeology
- Qanat
- Spring (hydrology)
- List of artesian wells in the United States
- Drilled wells (for bore water mechanics)
