= List of 1980s Super Bowl commercials =

This is a list of Super Bowl commercials that played during the 1980s. This article does not list advertisements for a local region or station (e.g. promoting local news shows), pre-kickoff and post-game commercials/sponsors, or in-game advertising sponsors and television bumpers.

== 1980 (Super Bowl XIV) ==
Product type	Product/title	Plot/notes
Beer	Budweiser "Rocket Car"	Stan Barrett's attempt at breaking the land speed record in the Budweiser Rocket is depicted in this ad.
Financial services	EF Hutton "Joggers"	While two guys are out for a jog, a discussion about the market forms. One runner talks about looking into tax-free incomes, thanks to their broker suggesting it. The other runner talks about his broker being EF Hutton. Before going into detail on what was discussed with his broker, everyone around the two runners stops and listen to what the runner has to say about EF Hutton. Also aired during Super Bowl XIII
Privately held company	Crown Forklifts "Noah's Ark*"	
Security	Master Lock "Marksman 2"	
Soft drink	Coca-Cola "Hey Kid, Catch!"	A young kid tries to talk to "Mean" Joe Greene by the locker room after a game. Greene is his usual "mean" self until the kid insists Greene has his Coke. After Greene drinks the Coke, he "sweetens" up and offers the kid his jersey, saying, "Hey, kid... catch." Also aired during Super Bowl XIII and again at Super Bowl XV
Wine	Paul Masson Wine "Orson Welles"	

== 1981 (XV) ==
Product type	Product/title	Plot/notes
Beer	Budweiser "Hard Day's Work"	Part of the "This Buds for You" campaign; dedicated to those who put in a hard day's work
Beer	Budweiser "Workers"	A "This Buds for You" Spot saluting the workers who make sports equipment
Beer	Miller High Life "Eddie Rabbitt in Concert"	Eddie Rabbitt ends a concert by performing "I Love a Rainy Night" and heads backstage for Miller Time.
Beer	Miller Lite "Not the Same"	John Madden talks about how Miller Lite has helped him with relaxing, in contrast to his coaching days. While talking about the beer, he gets out of seat and starts rambling about why he prefers Miller Lite to other beers. The ad ends with Madden bursting through the wall and continuing his rant.
Beer	Pabst Blue Ribbon "Spirit"	
Camera	Polaroid "Now with a Flash"	A couple walks in a park. The man shows that now you can have a flash on your Polaroid Camera, showing brighter photos.
Security	Master Lock "Marksman 2"	
Soft drink	Coca-Cola "Hey Kid, Catch!"	A young kid tries to talk to "Mean" Joe Greene by the locker room after a game. Greene is his usual "mean" self until the kid insists Greene has his Coke. After Greene drinks the Coke, he "sweetens" up and offers the kid his jersey, saying, "Hey, kid...Catch." Also aired during Super Bowl XIII and Super Bowl XIV.

== 1982 (XVI) ==
Product type	Product/title	Plot/notes
Airlines	Eastern "More"	Eastern president, Frank Borman, thanks those who made Eastern, Americas favorite airline.
Analgesic	Anacin "Pet Shop"	A woman at a pet shop gets a headache and considers taking Tylenol to remedy it. A man she is with, however, recommends that she takes Anacin 3 instead.
Automotive	Bendix "Power of Ingenuity"	Cliff Robertson talks about how Bendix creates the future through the power of ingenuity.
Automotive	ACDelco "Ice Block Demo"	The Delco Freedom 60 Car Battery is placed in a block of ice and is able to start a car up.
Beer	Löwenbräu "Skiers"	On a skinning trip, a trio of guys have climbed a snowy slope. One of the skiers wants to turn around and head back, but another one tells him that they have Löwenbräu at the lodge. This changers the skiers mind and the three ski back to the lodge for some Löwenbräu.
Beer	Michelob Light "Skiers"	Two skiers have a race to the bottom of a hill for a Michelob Light.
Beer	Pabst Blue Ribbon "The Same"	People give their thoughts on Pabst Blue Ribbon beer.
Car	Cadillac "Working Late"	The Cadillac de Ville is the payoff for a man who has worked long, hard hours in the office.
Car	Ford "Telly Savalas"	Telly Savalas promotes the Ford Escort.
Car	Honda "Engineering Wonder"	Advertisement for the Honda Accord. Talks about the upgraded features and improvements for the model year.
Car	Honda "Signs"	Promoting the Honda Civic; highlights the fuel economy of the car
Car	Mercedes-Benz "Test Track"	The Mercedes-Benz 240D is put to the test at the Mercedes test track.
Car	Subaru "Ruth Gordon"	The Subaru BRAT is promoted by Ruth Gordon.
Computer	RadioShack "Color Computer"	A commercial for the TRS-80 computer
Electronics	Canon "Joe Theismann"	The ad starts with a professional photographer taking photos of Joe Theismann during a football game with a Canon AE-1 camera. It ends with Theismann using the same camera to take photos of his family throwing around a football at their house.
Insurance	Sentry Insurance "Ernie"	A worker named Ernie is welcomed back from an injury by his co-workers.
Petroleum	Gulf Oil "Wide Load"	A motorist uses Gulf Super Unleaded fuel for his station wagon to get around a wide load semi truck while driving up a steep hill.
Restaurant	McDonald's "Hopscotch"	Two kids are playing hopscotch while singing the McDonald's menu. Soon, the whole neighborhood joins in.
Restaurant	Wendy's "David "Deacon" Jones	David "Deacon" Jones talks about how Wendy's has twice the meat for one burger.
Security	Master Lock "Marksman 2"	

== 1983 (XVII) ==
Product type	Product/title	Plot/notes
Beer	Budweiser Light "Born of Tradition"	A Clydesdale runs through the snow while a voiceover talks about Budweiser Light beer.
Beer	Budweiser Light "Drafted"	Despite being a 7th round draft pick, a football player manages to bring out his best during a team practice.
Beer	Miller High Life "Welcome to Miller Time"	
Car	Chrysler "Ricardo Montalbán"	Ricardo Montalbán promotes the Chrysler New Yorker.
Car rental	Hertz "Best of Both Worlds"	O. J. Simpson explains how Hertz gives customers the "Best of Both Worlds with the gifts they provide their customers and the travel rewards program that they offer as well.
Electronics	Atari "Judy"	Compares the Atari 5200 SuperSystem to arcade games. Highlights the 'pause' feature that the system provides, in which it allows the player to receive a call from a woman named 'Judy' all thanks to this feature.
Electronics	Canon "Joe Theismann"	The ad starts with a professional photographer taking photos of Joe Theismann during a football game with a Canon AE-1 camera. The ad ends with Theismann using the same camera to take photos of his family throwing around a football at their house. Also aired during Super Bowl XVI
Manufacturing	Briggs & Stratton "Invisible"	People use Briggs & Stratton equipment but only the engine is visible.
Restaurant	Burger King "Ultimate Weapon"	A female Burger King employee (played by Elisabeth Shue) appears on screen, telling the viewer that if they have not switched over to Burger King yet, they have no choice but to use the 'Ultimate Weapon' on them: a montage of the Whopper sandwich set to Ride of the Valkyries.
Security	Master Lock "Marksman 2"	

== 1984 (XVIII) ==
Product type	Product/title	Plot/notes
Airline	Eastern "Wings"	At a ceremony, an Eastern Air Lines pilot gets his wings badge from a trio of businesspeople for excellent service.
Analgesic	Anacin "That's Football"	A football player talks about using Anacin after a game, to relieve pain.
Beer	Budweiser Light "Hockey Goalie"	During a hockey game, a goalie brings out his best and helps his team win.
Beer	Miller Lite "Train"	John Madden explains why he prefers taking the train over flying.
Beer	Stroh Light "Poker Game"	For a group of guys, poker night becomes a Stroh Light night, thanks to host providing his friends with Stroh Light beer.
Car	Chevrolet "Eurosport"	Promoting the Chevy Celebrity Eurosport; features footage of the car driving around a unique custom backdrop with a voiceover and jingle
Car	Chevrolet "Mars"	A Chevy Camaro drives around Mars, while bystanders, with glowing eyes, watch the car drive by them.
Car	Toyota "Dan and Evi Gurney"	Dan Gurney takes his wife, Evi, out for a ride in a Toyota Supra around the Riverside International Raceway in southern California
Car	Toyota "The Truck World On Its Rear"	Toyota's new trucks for 1984, cause other pickups to lift up and stand on their rear bumpers.
Computer	Apple Macintosh "1984"	In what some call the greatest Super Bowl commercial of all time, an Olympian runs to save a race of hypnotized humans from their computer overlord. Being chased by police, the Olympian throws a hammer at the screen overlord, and a beacon of light shines to stunned silence from the followers. The ad closes with the narration "On January 24th, Apple Computer will introduce Macintosh. And you'll see why 1984 won't be like 1984."
Computer	Atari "Get Started"	Alan Alda unpacks, hooks up, and turns on an Atari XL home computer in a 30-second commercial.
Computer	IBM "Differences"	Families from all over the world watch the Olympic Games.
Computer	Tandy "Dawn of a New Era"	Bill Bixby pitches the new Tandy TRS-80 Model 2000 in space. Co-branded spot alongside RadioShack.
Electronics	Sharp "Down To Size"	The ad begins with a man in a copy center, with a Sharp SF 900 Copier. As he describes the features of the copier a giant saw cuts through the wall. This is repeated two more times, until only a fourth of the center is left. Each time the saw cuts a section off, the man quickly and frightenedly moves over to the section of the copy center that remains.
Insurance	Nationwide "Puppy"	A little boy named Andrew gets a puppy from his parents. The narrator states that puppy is going to help him learn more about love and responsibility. This segways into the narrator stating that when the boy gets older, his responsibilities will increase, and that Nationwide will be there to help him; just like they have with the rest of their family. The ad ends with Andrew and his new puppy sleeping in a blanket, in allusion to the blanket protection that Nationwide provides to their customers.
Pet food	Purina Dog Chow "Danny Boy"	While walking on the beach with their dog named 'Danny Boy', a son asks his father how old their dog will get.
Retail	ComputerLand "It's Time We Had A Talk"	A daughter takes her father to a ComputerLand store to look for a computer.
Security	Master Lock "The Doubters"	Following up from their 'Marksman' spot, several organizations which doubted the outcome of firing a bullet into a Master Lock, repeat the test; only to get the same result as the original ad.
Soft drink	Diet Coke "Olympic Dad"	A track runner gets mentorship from his father, which leads him to winning the gold medal at the Olympics.

== 1985 (XIX) ==
Product type	Product/title	Plot/notes
Beer	Bud Light "Give Me a Light"	
Beer	Miller Lite "Respect"	
Car	Ford "On the Road Again"	Promotes Ford trucks and features a cover of On the Road Again with reworked lyrics focusing on driving Ford trucks
Car	Ford "Ski Trip"	On a very snowy day, a family takes their Ford Tempo and goes on a skiing trip.
Computer	Apple, Inc. "Lemmings"	A long line of blindfolded office workers approaches a cliff. One by one, the workers plunge to their deaths, while a voice says that Macintosh Office will soon be announced. The person at the end of the line then stops and removes his blindfold, taking in the situation before turning around and seeing another line of people approaching.
Exercise equipment	Soloflex "Work of Art"	
Fire HVAC security equipment and controls	Johnson Controls "LAX"	
Fire HVAC security equipment and controls	Johnson Controls "Superdome"	
General Building Materials Composites	Owens Corning "Perfect Crime"	
Hospitality	Hyatt Hotels "Hotel in Space"	A father and son travel to space and stay at a Hyatt space station hotel. Bart Starr makes a cameo appearance.
Manufacturing	The Canned Food Information Council "Brilliance"	
Manufacturing	ITT "Brakes"	Showcases the anti-lock braking system provided in cars through ITT's Teves division; The ad shows a comparison of a car test; first with a car that does not have the ABS feature on a slick road, which causes it to spin out when braking. Next, a car with the ABS feature installed on it is put to the test. This time the car stops on the slick road smoothly and without spinning out.
Manufacturing	Minolta "Neat Freak"	
Marine Corps	U.S. Marines "Sword"	
Security	Master Lock "The Doubters"	Following up from their 'Marksman' spot, several organizations which doubted the outcome of firing a bullet into a Master Lock, repeat the test; only to get the same result as the original ad. Also aired during Super Bowl XVIII
Software	Cullinet "Bobby Orr"	Bobby Orr talks about Cullinet software and its use in the business world.

== 1986 (XX) ==
Product type	Product/title	Plot/notes
Credit card	Discover Card "Dawn of Discover"	
Dairy	American Dairy Association	
Fire HVAC security equipment and controls	Johnson Controls "LAX"	
Fire HVAC security equipment and controls	Johnson Controls "Superdome"	
Food	Eagle Snacks "Begged"	In response to the strong demand from customers wanting to purchase the peanuts they served on flights; an airplane parks at a supermarket to drop off a supply of Eagle Honey Roasted Peanuts to sell at the store.
Hotels	Holiday Inn "A Promise"	
Insurance	John Hancock "Irving Marcelle"	A football player gives his retirement speech. During his speech, his estimated expenses followed by his needs, appear on screen. When the player ends his speech the answers to those expenses and needs appear.
Mail	UPS "Tour"	A group of businesses men from Japan take a tour of a UPS facility.
Printers	Minolta "Uncle Ebenezer"	
Marine Corps	U.S. Marines "Sword"	
Restaurant	Burger King "Find Herb"	
Restaurant	McDonald's "McDLT"	
Truck bedliner	Duraliner "Your Neighbor"	
Watches	Timex "Atlantis"	A group of deep-sea divers discover a giant Timex Atlantis 100 watch buried at the bottom of the sea.

== 1987 (XXI) ==
Product type	Product/title	Plot/notes
Airlines	American Airlines "Reward Trip"	Back from his flight, a businessman returns to the office only to receive a voicemail from his boss. When listening to the message, the businessman finds out he has been rewarded a vacation for all the trips he has had to take for his job with American Airlines.
Beer	Bud Light "Party Animal"	
Fire HVAC security equipment and controls	Johnson Controls "LAX"	
Fire HVAC security equipment and controls	Johnson Controls "Superdome"	
Food	Kellogg's Corn Flakes "America's Cereal"	People give their thoughts on Kellogg's Corn Flakes cereal.
Insurance	Allstate "Leave It to Us"	
Insurance	The Travelers "Artist"	An artist paints a piece that centers around the Travelers Red Umbrella logo.
Restaurant	McDonald's "New Kid"	An elderly man has his first day on the job at McDonald's.
Retail	Foot Locker "Futuristic"	A futuristic ball game is played in space.
Soft drink	Diet Coke "Pierce Brosnan vs Ninja"	Pierce Brosnan enjoys a Diet Coke with a woman, while a ninja attempts to attack him and fails doing so.
Soft drink	RC Cola "Little Red Wagon"	A little boy and his dog goes around collecting Pepsi and Coca-Cola cans. Each can they find goes in the toy wagon he is pulling along. When the wagon gets full, he brings it to a recycling center and exchanges the cans for some coins. The ad ends with the little boy using the coins from the Coke and Pepsi cans he had collected, to purchase an RC Cola from a vending machine.
Soft drink	Slice "Baseball"	Major League Baseball stars, Lenny Dykstra, Wally Joyner, Mike Scott, and Ozzie Smith play a game of baseball. A splah effect happens with each movement made.
Telecommunications	Contel "Charlton Heston"	Charlton Heston talks about how business manage information with Contel.
Tire	Goodyear "Lost Pet"	Thanks to the Goodyear Vector tires used on their car, a father and son are able to drive around and find their lost dog, despite the heavy rainfall.

== 1988 (XXII) ==
Product type	Product/title	Plot/notes
Airline	American Airlines "Pilot"	Reaching the end of his tour, a military pilot is given an acceptance letter; confirming his new role as a pilot for American Airlines.
Airline	Delta "Your Bag"	A ticket agent for Delta skillfully maneuvers through a crowd at an airport, in order to return a suitcase for a customer who is about to board an airplane.
Airline	Pan Am "Half Fare No Fare Fare"	A couple debates on where they want to travel to.
Alcohol	Bartles & Jaymes "Bugle"	Frank Bartles and Ed Jaymes promote the new Bartles & Jaymes Premium Berry Wine cooler.
Antacid	Alka-Seltzer "Felix"	Felix McGrath of the United States Ski Team talks about using Alka-Seltzer Plus.
Aspirin	Bayer "Birth"	A man, who four years ago had a heart attack, gets to watch his wife give birth.
Battery	Energizer "Jacko"	Australian rules footballer, Mark "Jacko" Jackson, sings about Energizer Batteries while on a train.
Beer	Bud Light "Goalie"	Spuds MacKenzie plays goalie for the US Hockey team.
Beer	Bud Light "Ski Jump"	Spuds MacKenzie competes in a ski jump competition.
Beer	Budweiser "The Promise"	Narrator talks about the genuine promise of Budweiser beer.
Beer	Budweiser "Rehab"	After dealing with an injury, an athlete trains for a comeback.
Beer	Budweiser "Strength"	A spot which symbolizes the Budweiser Clydesdales as a metaphor for Budweiser's quality taste.
Beer	Michelob "After Midnight"	Eric Clapton performs After Midnight in a bar.
Beer	Stroh's Light "Impressions"	Alex the Dog does impressions of several famous dogs in front of a group of guys.
Candy	Nestle Crunch "Jimmy Connors"	Jimmy Connors appears with his family.
Car	Eagle "Euro"	An ad for the new Eagle Premier, describing it as an American car with European sophistication and handling.
Car	Pontiac "If You Like To Drive"	Promoting the Pontiac Grand Prix. A voiceover informs the viewer about the car as a car for those who really like to drive.
Car	Suzuki "Great Lengths"	A driver in a Suzuki Samurai is revealed as someone who takes short cuts to make driving fun.
Car	Volkswagen "Interact"	A Volkswagen Jetta swerves through rows of Volkswagen engineers on a test track.
Car	Yugo "Tough	A group of Yugo cars drive through a setting, surrounded by canyons, while the narrator describes the cars as "tough, dependable, and affordable".
Clothing	Hanes "Mike Ditka"	Appearing in a locker room, Mike Ditka talks about switching to Hanes T-shirts and underwear.
Computer	IBM "Signals"	An IBM spokesperson appears with a football referee to discuss referee signals.
Credit card	Visa "Olympics"	A spot promoting the 1988 Winter Olympics and highlighting how Visa is the official card of the Olympics.
Food	Campbell's "Eat You Up"	Howie Long takes care of his mean appetite by having a bowl of Campbell's Chunky Soup
Food	Campbell's "Get Over Here"	Mike Ditka enjoys a can of Campbell's Chunky Soup.
Insurance	John Hancock "Michael Mark"	In a conversation between two family members, a young male named Michael Mark, discusses his income and is asked about what investments he has ade.
Insurance	New York Life "Ice Man"	In the year 2014, a cryogenically frozen skier from 1988 is thawed out.
Insurance	Travelers Insurance "Red Umbrella"	A person with a red umbrella stands out in a crowd.
Mail	UPS "Flying Letters"	A stack of UPS Next Day Air Letter envelopes flies out, one-by-one; each of them landing on a desk.
Manufacturing	Dupont "Great Saves"	A woman at a fancy party leaps to prevent a piece of food from landing on the carpet and staining it.
Motor oil	Pennzoil "World Class Protection"	Silhouettes of five of the world's leading motor oils are displayed on screen. One-by-one, each bottle floats away when the voice over states that only one motor oil exceeds all car makers US warranty requirements and surpasses the American Petroleum Institute's highest standards for car engine protection for every weight it sells. This leaves only one motor oil bottle left which is revealed to be Pennzoil.
Motor oil	Valvoline "Heat Wave"	Advertising the company's line of Turbo Formula motor oil; a cover of the song, Heat Wave, plays while a montage of people driving various turbo-charged cars is shown for the duration of the ad.
Personal care	Old Spice "More Effective"	Promoting the brand's Fast Track Deodorant; for the ad, a voiceover says that "It's More Effective Than the Leading Men's Deodorant" and that clinical tests have shown that it blocks odor; prior to revealing the product
Real estate	Coldwell Banker "Skipping Stones"	A mother and her daughter skipping stones across the water of a pond. The pond is next to a new house the daughter had purchased. They have a conversation about the new house and the daughter talks about the ways that Coldwell Banker has been able to help her be able to buy the home.
Restaurant	McDonald's "Cheddar Melt"	Promoting the new Cheddar Melt burger
Restaurant	McDonald's "County Champ"	A track athlete returns to his hometown after failing to make the Track and Field team for the Olympics.
Restaurant	McDonald's "Time-Out"	An advertisement with Michael Jordan is interrupted to promote the introduction of the Cheddar Melt.
Restaurant	McDonald's "Tossed Salad"	Advertising the fast-food chain's line of Tossed Fresh Salads, complete with a jingle
Security	Master Lock "Lock In"	Montage of people using various types of locks from Master Lock to secure their items.
Soft drink	Diet Coke "Out On A Ledge"	Demi Moore has to retrieve her Diet Coke which accidentally has fallen onto a ledge, high up on her apartment building.
Soft drink	Diet Pepsi "Mad Dog"	To get a Diet Pepsi from a vending machine, a couple has to maneuver around a dog trying to chase them. Starring Michael J. Fox.
Tire	Michelin "I Like Your New Car"	Two voice overs talk about the new car one of them got. Visually, the ad shows close ups of the car and a baby.
Tire	Michelin "See Saw"	A Michelin tire slides from one end to another on a see saw.

== 1989 (XXIII) ==
Product type	Product/title	Plot/notes
Beer	Budweiser "Bud Bowl I"	A team of Budweiser beer bottles compete against Bud Light beer bottles in a simulated football game.
Car	Dodge "Space Shuttle"	While waiting for a space shuttle to land, a crowd of people check out a Dodge Spirit and give their thoughts on the car.
Credit card	American Express "Miami Miami Miami"	
Restaurant	McDonald's "Stadium"	At Super Bowl XXIII, the scoreboard at the endzone displays a message celebrating the 21st birthday for the Big Mac. The crowd then sings Happy Birthday in honor of the sandwich.
Retail	Sears "Our House"	A family begins their morning off by using Kenmore appliances to make breakfast and clean their clothes. Our House by Crosby, Stills, Nash & Young provides the soundtrack to the advertisement.
Security	Masterlock "Lock Abuse"	People are unable to break into various locations due to each location being secured by a Masterlock lock.
Soft drink	Diet Coke "The Move Is On"	
