= White Mountain Cooler =

Discontinued alcoholic beverage

- Type: Malt beverage
- Manufacturer: Stroh Brewery Company
- Origin: United States
- Introduced: 1985
- Discontinued: 1990s
- Proof (US): 5%
- Flavour: Wild Raspberry, Original Citrus, Cranberry Splash
- Variants: Wine cooler
- Related products: Gallo's Bartles & Jaymes wine coolers, Seagram's Coolers, Brown Forman's California Cooler, Canandaigua Wine Company's Sun Country Wine Cooler, Miller Brewing Company's Matilda Bay Coolers, Anheuser-Busch's Dewey Stevens coolers. Malt based beverages like G. Heileman's Champale and Malt Duck.

White Mountain Cooler was an alcoholic beverage that debuted in the US market in 1985. It was produced by the Stroh Brewery Company. By 1987, it was ranked fifth in the malted beverage cooler market.

White Mountain was originally formulated as a malternative, and was the top-selling brand of malternative beverages which were very popular in the mid-to-late 1980s. White Mountain was often called a wine cooler but was more accurately labeled a "beer cooler" by many, as its base was an alcoholic malt beverage rather than wine. The beverage was very sweet and came in strong fruit flavors such as Wild Raspberry, Original Citrus, and Cranberry Splash that obscured the taste of its alcoholic base. It was considered a popular alternative to beer, and was often targeted toward women and younger consumers.

White Mountain was sold in 12 oz. bottles, with an alcohol content similar to that of beer (approximately 5% ABV). It was also available on draft (draught), and in 32 and 40 oz. bottles in select markets.

== Variants ==
Stroh's changed the formulation to a wine base shortly before discontinuing the product line. With Miller and Anheuser-Busch, Inc. exiting the cooler market in 1989 and 1987 respectively, White Mountain Cooler remained as the only brewery-produced wine cooler.

== Trademark ==
In March 1988, Stroh's began using the slogan, WHITE MOUNTAIN COOLER - CRISP AND REFRESHING - COLORADO PREMIUM COOLER COMPANY Stroh's filed a U.S. federal trademark registration for it later that year in July 1988. It was registered in 1990, and canceled in 1996.

== Advertising ==
Radio ads for White Mountain Cooler were mostly unscripted. An associate creative director at Grey Advertising assisted with the creation of the White Mountain Cooler Comedy Tour. In 1990, Stroh's announced it would no longer be using Grey's for White Mountain Cooler advertising.

== Related products ==
Competitors to White Mountain included Gallo's Bartles and Jaymes wine coolers, Seagram's Coolers, Brown Forman's California Cooler, Canandaigua Wine Company's Sun Country Wine Cooler, Miller Brewing Company's Matilda Bay Coolers, and Anheuser-Busch's Dewey Stevens coolers and malt-based beverages like G.Hielmans Champale and Malt Duck. Wine cooler sales started to fall sharply by the end of the decade, and White Mountain, along with the entire industry, virtually disappeared in the early 1990s. The emergence of Zima as the new malternative marked the end of White Mountain. Miller and Anheuser Busch exited the wine cooler market. California Cooler and Sun Country ceased production. Gallo and Seagram's switched their Coolers to malt-based in the late 1980s.

A renaissance in the malternative industry that began with Zima and continued through the late 1990s introducing brands such as Mike's Hard Lemonade and Smirnoff Ice has been marked by better advertising and crisper-tasting products than the White Mountain Cooler. However, for many members of Generation X, White Mountain marked the genesis of beer-based beverages for people who did not like to drink beer.
