= Somebody Waiting =

1971 film

- Directed by: Hal Riney; Dick Snider
- Written by: Hal Riney; Dick Snider
- Produced by: Hal Riney; Dick Snider
- Narrated by: James Daly
- Cinematography: Woody Omens
- Production company: Snider Productions for the UCSF School of Nursing
- Distributed by: University of California Extension
- Release date: 1971
- Country: United States
- Language: English

Somebody Waiting is a 1971 American short documentary film produced by Woody Omens. It was nominated for an Academy Award for Best Documentary Short.
