= Riney =

Riney is a given name and surname. Notable people with the name include:

- Hal Riney (1932–2008), American advertising executive
  - Publicis & Hal Riney, American advertising agency
- Rodger O. Riney (born 1945), American billionaire, founder of Scottrade
- Riney Lochmann (born 1944), American basketball player
