= Publicis & Hal Riney =

American advertising agency

- Industry: Advertising agency
- Predecessor: Hal Riney & Partners
- Founded: 1977; 48 years ago in San Francisco, United States
- Founder: Hal Riney
- Headquarters: United States
- Owner: Publicis
- Website: www.hrp.com

Publicis & Hal Riney is an American advertising agency, founded in San Francisco in 1977 by Hal Riney as Hal Riney & Partners. He had previously led the west coast office of Ogilvy & Mather since 1976.

They are best known for their award-winning work on Saturn automobiles and HP. Other notable campaigns have been for Sprint, Crocker Bank, Perrier, Alamo Rent A Car, Henry Weinhard's, E & J Gallo Winery (specifically Bartles & Jaymes), and the 15-year running Jared Fogle campaign for Subway. Riney had previously created and narrated the noted Morning in America and Bear in the woods television commercials for the successful Ronald Reagan 1984 Presidential re-election campaign.

The agency was purchased by Publicis in 1998. In 1999, materials created by Publicis & Hal Riney for the Cartoon Network animated series Dexter's Laboratory were released in Subway stores as part of a promotion called "Dexter's Super Computer Giveaway".

In 2008, the agency was awarded a Gold Lion at the Cannes Lions International Advertising Festival for its work on a website for AAA. Current clients include U.S. Cellular, Chimay, Pogo.com, HP, Compaq and Walmart.
