= Justin Kutcher =

American sports commentator

Justin Kutcher is a sportscaster formerly with Fox Sports. He is the play-by-play broadcaster for Atlanta Falcons preseason games and CBSSN, and was formerly the play-by-play announcer for the Washington Wizards on NBC Sports Washington. Kutcher joined Fox Sports in 2012 as a play-by-play broadcaster for Fox College Football and Fox College Hoops. He made his Major League Baseball broadcasting debut in April 2013.

== Biography ==
=== Early career ===
Kutcher announced college sports for the Big Ten Network, CBS College Sports and NCAA Productions. He called Minor League Baseball at the Double-A to Triple-A levels, such as for the Portland Beavers. He also anchored MLB.com's Daily Rewind and Post Season Live during the 2008 MLB playoffs. Other assignments include calling Portland Timbers soccer, the 2006 World Softball Championships in Beijing and Boston Terriers women's basketball. Before moving into the booth, he served as a statistician for MLB on Fox, working in the playoffs and the World Series as an assistant to Joe Buck and Tim McCarver.

=== ESPN ===
Before joining Fox, Kutcher worked for ESPN, where he called football, basketball, baseball, softball, ice hockey and volleyball games. He was especially involved in calling college sports such as college football, college basketball, college baseball and college volleyball. He called NBA regular season games for ESPN as well. He even called high school football and basketball for the network. He also announced the NCAA men's volleyball tournament.

=== FOX Sports ===
Kutcher calls Fox College Football. His partner was Eric Crouch in 2012; it is now either James Bates, Joel Klatt, or Petros Papadakis. Kutcher also calls select MLB games on Fox and Fox Sports 1. He is also a play-by-play announcer for college basketball on Fox Sports 1. In 2013, he filled in for Gus Johnson for a Week 15 NFL matchup between the Arizona Cardinals and the Tennessee Titans. He became a regular fill-in for the NFL on Fox beginning in 2014. He also was a commentator for FOX's coverage of the 2015 FIFA Women's World Cup and the 2016 Copa América Centenario. He also calls Westminster Kennel Club Dog Show daytime coverage for fellow Fox channel Nat Geo Wild and the Masters Agility Championship, which is also part of the Westminster Kennel Club events.

=== Wizards ===
In 2019, NBC Sports Washington hired Justin Kutcher as the new television play-by-play announcer for Washington Wizards' games, replacing Steve Buckhantz. Kutcher worked with the Wizards until April 2022.

== Personal life ==
While attending Boston University, he was sports director at student station WTBU. He graduated with a degree from the College of Communication. He is also a graduate of the Hopkins School. He grew up in Fairfield, Connecticut and lives in Charlotte, North Carolina.
