= Stroh's Ice Cream =

American ice cream brand

Stroh's
- Product type: Ice cream
- Current owner: Dairy Farmers of America
- Country: U.S.
- Previous owners: Stroh Brewery Company

Stroh's Ice Cream is an American brand of ice cream, founded by the Stroh Brewery Company of Detroit. Stroh's' products were manufactured and marketed by Dean Foods, which had acquired the brand in 2007. Following Dean Foods’ liquidation of its assets, the rights to manufacture Stroh’s Ice Cream were acquired by Dairy Farmers of America, who continue to manufacture the ice cream to this day.

Stroh's Ice Cream is a regional brand distributed mainly in the Midwestern United States. It used to be owned by its namesake company, the Stroh Brewing Company, which had a large presence (and in some cases, like the Detroit area, still has) in this region.

== History ==
Former Stroh's Ice Cream production and distribution facility in Detroit, Michigan

The Stroh Brewery Company, like many other alcohol-producers in the United States, was left searching for ways to restructure its company at the advent of Prohibition in 1920. With the closing of saloons across the nation, ice cream parlors increased in popularity as a new place for the average man to frequent. Julius Stroh, the head of Stroh's Brewery at the time, decided to convert the beer-brewing facilities of its factory in Detroit to producing non-alcoholic products such as near beer (beer with its alcohol extracted), birch beer, soft drinks, malt products, and ice. It also produced ice cream under the "Alaska" brand. At the end of prohibition in America in 1933, the ice cream operation proved to be popular and profitable enough to continue alongside the brewing operation.

In the early 1980s, Stroh's built a new ice cream production facility on Maple Street in Detroit, right down the road from its main brewery, which was demolished in 1985. Stroh's sold the facility in 1989 as a part of corporate restructuring at Stroh's. The Stroh Brewery Company sold all of its brands to Pabst Brewing Company and the Miller Brewing Company in 1999 and ended brewing operations. Stroh's Ice Cream was run by Melody Farms for several years, all the time keeping the Stroh's name, until that company was purchased by Dean Foods in 2005.

In 2019, Detroit Vineyards took over Stroh's facility near Eastern Market.

== See also ==
- List of ice cream brands
