= California Cooler =

Brand of alcoholic beverages

California Cooler is a brand of alcoholic beverage. The product is a sangria packaged in a 12 fl. oz. glass bottle. The California Cooler formula and packaging was the first to be known as a wine cooler.

Originally named Canada Cooler, the California Cooler package was re-designed by Glenn Martinez and Associates, and the drink was eventually also sold in a 2-liter bottle.

After its founding in 1976, the original California Cooler exploded on the beverage market when Lodi High School friends, Michael Crete and R. Stuart Bewley, and their original partners (mostly friends and family) raised $140,000 to begin commercial production. By 1985, it was selling a reported 12.3 million cases a year worth $125 million. In 1985, Crete and Bewley sold the company to liquor giant Brown-Forman Inc. in a deal valued up to $146 million. Brown Forman were national distributor of wine and spirits brands such as Jack Daniels and Korbel Sparkling wines.

Soon after, the competition began from wine maker giants E&J Gallo Winery who started strong marketing of its Bartles & Jaymes coolers and Seagram's own brand of wine coolers, California Cooler's market share began to slide. The cooler craze of the mid-eighties was celebrated with an Ad campaign by Chiat Day, featuring beach life scenes. Bartles & Jaymes, the second entrant into the wine cooler marketplace quickly came and took market share. Their ad campaign featured two actors playing the fictitious Frank Bartles and Ed Jaymes "Bartles and Jaymes" saying "Thank you for your support".

Overall wine-cooler sales dropped 98 percent in 1987 from 1976. California Cooler volume had dropped to 5 million cases, less than one-third of what Seagram's and Gallo each were moving.

On 30 March 2007, Majestic Brands, a Danville beverage company, announced plans to try to revive the California Cooler brand.
