= NCAA Productions =

NCAA Productions is the official film and television production company for the National Collegiate Athletic Association (NCAA).

== History ==
=== Football ===
It was founded by Dick Snider as NCAA Films. One of the earliest programs to be produced was the television show College Football, the first Sunday morning show to nationally broadcast college football highlights.

From 1946 to 1970, Look published the Football Writers Association of America (FWAA) Team. After Look folded, the FWAA started a long association with NCAA Films, which produced a 30-minute television show and sold it to sponsors.

=== Basketball ===
In 1979, the NCAA Division I men's basketball tournament expanded to add Thursday-Friday first round games. Those games were done by NCAA Productions, who also did the regional semifinals in prior years.

By the 1985 NCAA Division I men's basketball tournament (with four games being played at each first round site), NCAA Productions (who produced college basketball telecasts for ESPN) typically sent two announcer crews to each site to call two games each. During much of the 1980s, NCAA Productions televised and/or produced all tournament games which CBS did not carry. As previously mentioned, while ESPN provided a national audience for selected NCAA Productions (and sometimes, tape delayed) games, live telecasts were made available (via syndication) to local television stations in the participating markets.

== Commentators ==
- Dan Bonner – He serves as an analyst for regular-season college basketball games for CBS Sports, ESPN (1987–2001) and Fox Sports Net and has called ACC games for Jefferson Pilot Sports since 1983. Bonner also filled that role for NCAA Productions' broadcasts of tournament games from 1985 through 1990.
- Mike Mayock – Mayock has experience covering college football for Prime Network, NCAA Productions, Prime Sports Radio and the Big East Conference.
