= Ronald Reagan 1984 presidential campaign =

American political campaign

Ronald Reagan for President 1984
- Reagan–Bush campaign logo.
- Campaign: 1984 Republican primaries 1984 U.S. presidential election
- Candidate: Ronald Reagan; 40th President of the United States (1981–1989); George H. W. Bush; 43rd Vice President of the United States (1981–1989)
- Affiliation: Republican Party
- Status: Announced: October 17, 1983; Official nominee: August 23, 1984; Won election: November 6, 1984; Certification: January 7, 1985; Inaugurated: January 20, 1985
- Slogan(s): Morning in America; Bringing America Back... Prouder, Stronger, and Better

The 1984 presidential campaign of Ronald Reagan was a successful re-election campaign for President of the United States in 1984 by incumbent president Ronald Reagan, who had taken office on January 20, 1981. Reagan and incumbent vice president George H. W. Bush defeated Democratic presidential nominee, and former Vice President under Jimmy Carter, Walter Mondale and vice presidential nominee Geraldine Ferraro. Reagan, a Republican president and former Governor of California from 1967 to 1975, launched his presidential bid on January 29th, 1984, and secured the nomination for his re-election on August 23, 1984.

Reagan authorized the formation of his 1984 campaign committee, Reagan-Bush '84, on October 17, 1983. He made the formal announcement of his candidacy for reelection on January 29, 1984. On August 23, he secured the nomination of the Republican Party at its convention in Dallas, Texas. The convention nominated Bush as his running mate.

On November 6, 1984, Reagan carried 49 of 50 states, winning the election with 58.8 percent of the popular vote and 525 electoral votes. Mondale carried only his home state, Minnesota, and the District of Columbia, receiving 40.6 percent and 13 electoral votes. Reagan's reelection was confirmed by the Electoral College on December 17 and certified by the joint session of the U.S. Congress on January 7, 1985. At 73 years old, Reagan was then the oldest incumbent president to win a presidential election. He was inaugurated for his second term on January 20, 1985.

== Chronicle ==
=== Primaries ===
Reagan's authorized campaign, Reagan-Bush '84, was established in October 1983 with Senator Paul Laxalt as chairman, Edward J. Rollins as Campaign Director, and Lee Atwater as deputy director. Angela "Bay" Buchanan was Treasurer and James H. Lake was Communications Director. Other long-time Reagan operatives on the 1984 campaign included Stuart K. Spencer, Richard Wirthlin, Kenneth Khachigian, Drew Lewis, and Lyn Nofziger. The Finance Chairman was Joe M. Rodgers and the Finance Director was Timothy G. Ryan.

Though there had been some speculation that Reagan would not seek a second term, he announced his candidacy for re-election in a nationally televised speech on January 29, 1984. Reagan's only opponents in the Republican primary were former Minnesota governor and perennial candidate Harold Stassen and former U.S. Special Envoy to Paraguay Ben Fernandez. The primaries were uncompetitive, as Reagan won 98.8% of the vote. Although Reagan faced only nominal opposition for the Republican nomination, the campaign did need to project Reagan's vision for a second term and mount an effective counter to the daily criticism coming from former Vice President Walter Mondale and others seeking the Democratic Party's nomination.

In May 1984, Reagan-Bush '84 launched a highly praised television ad blitz proclaiming, "It's Morning Again in America." The ads underscored a theme at the center of Reagan's campaign: that America was "Prouder, Stronger, and Better" under President Reagan's leadership. Campaign Director Ed Rollins noted, "We wanted to remind people how things were, and how they are getting better." The campaign budgeted up to $10 million in ad buys during the period before the August Republican convention.

Reagan-Bush '84 financed its pre-convention campaign, including the television ads, with a successful fundraising effort, reaching its fundraising goals by April 1984. Finance Director Timothy G. Ryan reported raising over $26 million, with $12 million from direct mail solicitations, $4 million from fundraising events, and over $10 million in federal matching funds. For his direct mail fundraising, Ryan used contributor lists from a number of Republican organizations that generated what was then the most successful political fundraising in American history, with an average contribution of $56.20. Additionally, Reagan-Bush '84 was the first presidential campaign to raise enough matchable contributions ($250 and less) to qualify for the maximum amount of Federal Election Commission matching funds for the pre-convention period. Over 300,000 people contributed to the campaign.

Reagan-Bush '84 did not accept any private contributions for the post-convention, general election campaign, opting instead to receive $40.4 million in funding from the Federal Election Commission.

=== Republican National Convention ===
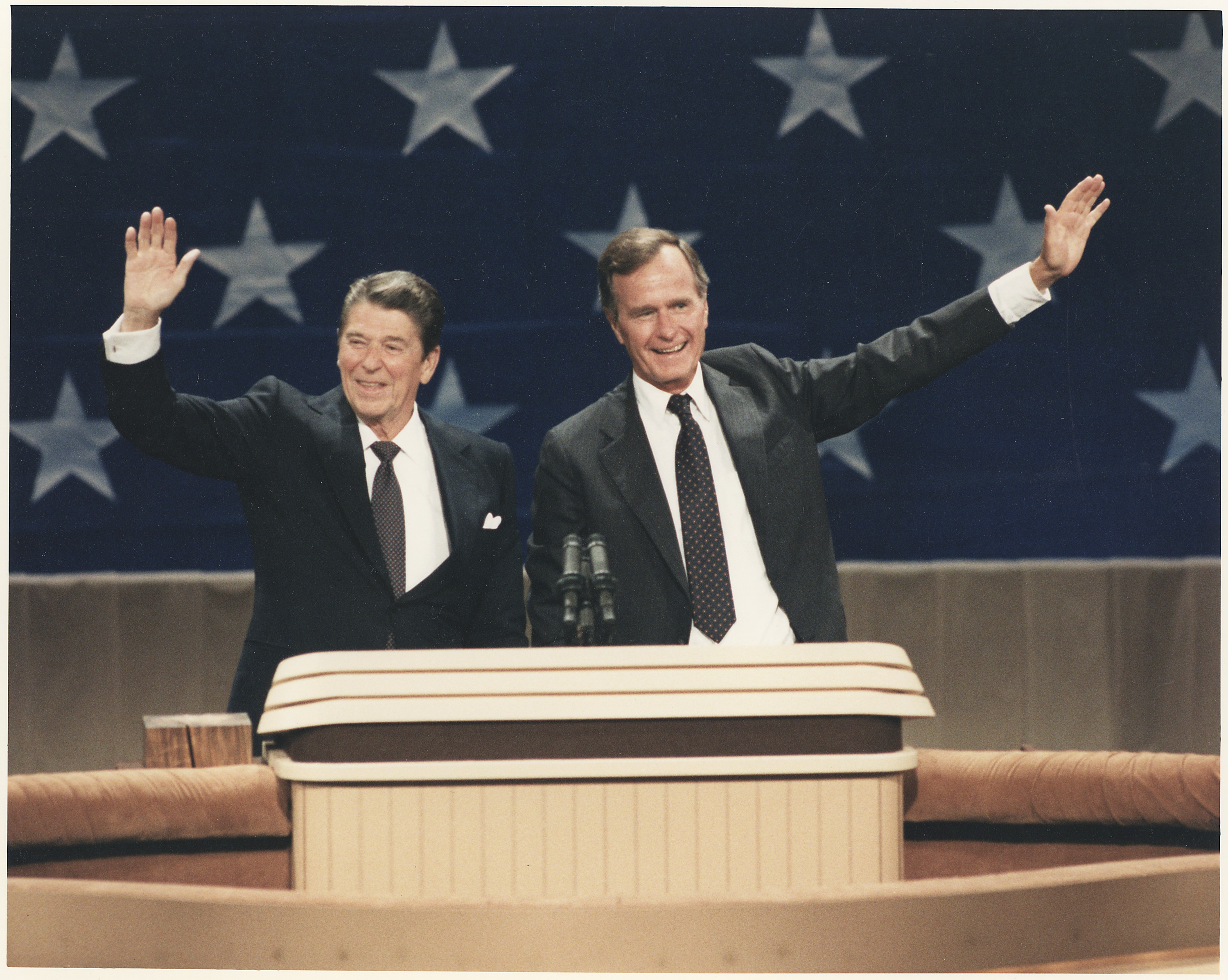
President Reagan and Vice President Bush at the Republican National Convention.

In August, Reagan accepted his party's nomination at the Republican National Convention in Dallas, Texas. He was, at that time, the oldest presidential nominee ever, at the age of 73 years, 6 months. In his acceptance speech, Reagan promised a "springtime of hope" for America. There were also several other main speakers, including Barry Goldwater, the Republican Party's 1964 nominee, who spoke on national defense.

==== Endorsements ====
List of Ronald Reagan endorsements

Reagan had received endorsements from: Cabinet Members

- Margaret Heckler Secretary of the United States Department of Health and Human Services
- William Ruckelshaus Administrator of the United States Environmental Protection Agency

Senators

- Thad Cochran (R-MS)
- Al D'Amato (R-NY)
- Jeremiah Denton (R-AL)
- Chuck Grassley (R-IA)
- Paula Hawkins (R-FL)
- Mark Hatfield (R-OR)
- John Heinz (R-PA)
- Jesse Helms (R-NC)
- Gordon J. Humphrey (R-NH)
- Roger Jepsen (R-IA)
- Robert Kasten (R-WI)
- Paul Laxalt (R-NV)
- Bob Packwood (R-OR)
- Charles H. Percy (R-IL)
- Arlen Specter (R-PA)
- Strom Thurmond (R-SC)
- John Tower (R-TX)
- Pete Wilson (R-CA)

Former Senators

- Frank Lausche (D-OH)

Representatives

- William Broomfield (R-MI)
- Carroll A. Campbell Jr. (R-SC)
- Rod Chandler (R-WA)
- Jim Courter (R-NJ)
- Mike DeWine (R-OH)
- Bob Dornan (R-CA)
- T. Cooper Evans (R-IA)
- Webb Franklin (R-MS)
- Phil Gramm (R-TX)
- Larry J. Hopkins (R-KY)
- Frank Horton (R-NY)
- Nancy Johnson (R-CT)
- John Kasich (R-OH)
- Jack Kemp (R-NY)
- Jim Leach (R-IA)
- Trent Lott (R-MS)
- Stewart McKinney (R-CT)
- Clarence E. Miller (R-OH)
- Carlos Moorhead (R-CA)
- Matthew J. Rinaldo (R-NJ)
- Hal Rogers (R-KY)
- Marge Roukema (R-NJ)
- Jim Sensenbrenner (R-WI)
- Bob Smith (R-OR)
- Denny Smith (R-OR)
- Gene Snyder (R-KY)
- Tom Tauke (R-IA)
- Bill Thomas (R-CA)
- Chalmers Wylie (R-OH)
- Ed Zschau (R-CA)

Former Representatives

- Lawrence J. DeNardis (R-CT)
- Billy Lee Evans (D-GA)
- H. R. Gross (R-IA)
- Clare Booth Luce (R-CT)
- John Davis Lodge (R-CT)

Governors

- Victor Atiyeh (R-OR)
- Terry Branstad (R-IA)
- George Deukmejian (R-CA)
- Thomas Kean (R-NJ)
- John Spellman (R-WA)
- John H. Sununu (R-NH)
- Dick Thornburgh (R-PA)

Former Governors

- Bill Clements (R-TX)
- John Connally (D-TX) (Republican since 1973)
- Edward J. King (D-MA)
- Dixy Lee Ray (D-WA)
- Jim Rhodes (R-OH)
- Allan Shivers (D-TX)
- James R. Thompson (R-IL)
- John A. Volpe (R-MA)

Mayors

- Thomas G. Dunn of Elizabeth (D-NJ)
- George Israel of Macon (R-GA)
- George Voinovich of Cleveland (R-OH)
- Bill Workman of Greenville (R-SC)

Former Mayors

- John F. Collins of Boston (D-MA)
- Eddie Knox of Charlotte (D-NC)
- Ralph Perk of Cleveland (R-OH)

Individuals

- Baseball player Johnny Bench
- NASCAR founder Bill France Sr. (Democrat)
- Singer Larry Gatlin
- Football player Rosey Grier (Democrat)
- Former Ohio State football coach Woody Hayes
- Sunshine Group founder Louise Sunshine (Democrat)
- Football player Bob Trumpy

Celebrities

- Morey Amsterdam
- Pat Boone
- Ron Ely
- Cary Grant
- Charlton Heston
- Fred MacMurray
- Hugh O'Brian
- Jerry Reed
- Joan Rivers
- Arnold Schwarzenegger
- Frank Sinatra
- Jaclyn Smith
- Robert Stack
- James Stewart
- Stephanie Zimbalist

== Opinion polling ==
In January 1983, a poll showed Reagan losing to Mondale by twelve percentage points. This was attributed to the poor economy and high unemployment rates, which resulted in Reagan's approval ratings being as low as 35 percent. However, the economy "picking up" had resulted in an increase in his approval ratings, and as the election progressed, Reagan opened a large lead over Mondale in the opinion polls.

According to a poll conducted by The New York Times in September 1984, 54 percent of the voters preferred Reagan over 33 percent for Mondale. It also found that 46 percent believed that Republicans had a lead in the handling of key issues compared to Democrats, despite a large number disagreeing with Reagan's views. For the favorability of the candidates, the poll found that two-thirds of the public had a positive view on Reagan, whereas only 27 percent had a favorable impression of Mondale.

Polls conducted in October and November showcased that Reagan's lead continued after the debates. Polls from Newsweek and USA Today showed Reagan ahead by 17 and 23 points, respectively. On October 30, U.S. News & World Report forecasted that the incumbent would be "on his way to a smashing victory on November 6". In November, Reagan's lead slightly decreased in the exit polls but remained substantial, with leads of 14 points and 18 points based on The Washington Post-ABC and Gallup polls respectively, the latter being similar to Reagan's final win of the popular vote by 18 points.

== See also ==
- 1984 Republican National Convention
- 1984 United States presidential election
- Second inauguration of Ronald Reagan
- Walter Mondale 1984 presidential campaign
- Ronald Reagan 1980 presidential campaign
