= Bear in the woods =

1984 TV commercial for Reagan campaign

Bear in the Woods
- Language: English
- Release date: 1984
- Written by: Hal Riney
- Country: United States

"Bear", a television commercial known for and often referred to by its opening line "There is a bear in the woods", was created for the 1984 U.S. presidential campaign of Republican Party candidate Ronald Reagan. The commercial featured a grizzly bear wandering through a forest, accompanied by narration suggesting that the bear could be dangerous and that it would be wise to be prepared for that possibility. In the final scene, a man appears and the bear takes a step back. The ad ends with a picture of Reagan and the tagline: "President Reagan: Prepared for Peace."

Without directly mentioning opponent Walter Mondale, defense spending, or the Soviet Union (traditionally symbolized by a bear), the ad suggested that Reagan was better prepared to recognize and deal with threats to global stability. Research by award-winning pollster Richard Wirthlin detected the nation's overriding concern about the Soviet Union and how to communicate the solution through subtlety.

== Details and full text of the narration ==
There is a bear in the woods. For some people, the bear is easy to see. Others don't see it at all. Some people say the bear is tame. Others say it's vicious and dangerous. Since no one can really be sure who's right, isn't it smart to be as strong as the bear? If there is a bear.

The advertisement was written and narrated by Hal Riney, a prominent advertising executive known for his distinctively warm and authoritative voice. Riney also created and narrated Ronald Reagan’s well-known "Morning in America" ad (titled "Prouder, Stronger, Better") and "America’s Back." His narration style, often described as rich and avuncular, was widely credited with evoking a sense of wholesomeness and authenticity, reinforcing the ad's emotional appeal and its message of national strength.

== Reception ==
Initial focus group screenings of the advertisement demonstrated that the audience found its message ambiguous, with some interpreting it as an indictment of environmentalism, others as a criticism of gun control, but the underlying metaphor of "peace through strength" remained strong. The advertisement itself had a very high recall rate amongst viewers, even those who were uncertain of its meaning.

The ad won praise from the political and advertising world. Republican strategist Dan Schnur said of Riney's work: "Most political advertising hits viewers over the head, while his work makes just as strong a point but in a less confrontational and a more soothing manner."

"There is a bear in the woods" continues to be a popular phrase to invoke when a potential problem looms on the horizon, especially in political circles. The ad was copied in the 2004 presidential campaign of Republican George W. Bush in an ad called "Wolves," which sought to draw parallels between terrorists and timber wolves. However, that ad explicitly mentioned terrorism, opponent John Kerry, liberalism, intelligence spending, and "America's defenses." In September 2015, Republican presidential candidate Ted Cruz created an ad titled "Scorpion" with an opening line, "There's a Scorpion in the desert". In the ad Cruz used the image of a scorpion to show the threat Islamic terrorism posed to the United States. This ad was instantly recognized as a copy or an homage to Reagan's.

Wirthlin's work on the first Reagan campaign, and particularly this ad, earned him the title "Adman of the Year" by Advertising Age and the Washington Post called Wirthlin the "Prince of Pollsters".

== See also ==
- "Morning in America"
- 1984 United States presidential election
