= Stroh Brewery Company =

Michigan beer brewery active 1850-2000

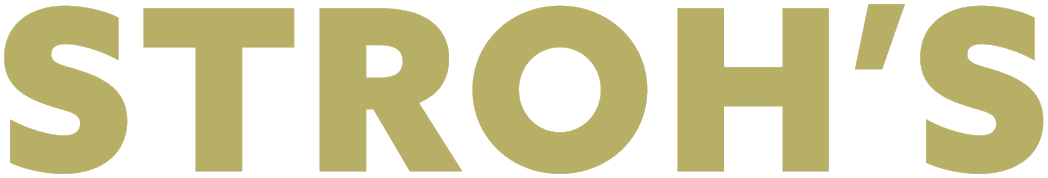
- Industry: Beverage
- Founded: 1850; 176 years ago in Detroit
- Founder: Bernhard Stroh
- Fate: Sold in 1999; business defunct and brewing of the original beer ended in 2000 Limited reintroduction of Stroh's brand to Detroit area in 2022
- Headquarters: U.S.
- Products: Beer
- Owner: Pabst Brewing Company
- Website: strohs-beer.com

The Stroh Brewery Company was a beer brewery in Detroit, Michigan. In addition to its own Stroh's brand, the company produced or bought the rights to several other brands including Goebel, Schaefer, Schlitz, Augsburger, Erlanger, Old Style, Lone Star, Old Milwaukee, Red River, and Signature, as well as manufacturing Stroh's Ice Cream. The company was taken over and broken up in 2000, but some of its brands continued to be made by the new owners. The Stroh's brand is currently owned and marketed by Pabst Brewing Company, except in Canada where the Stroh brands are owned by Sleeman Breweries.

== Company history ==
=== Establishment ===
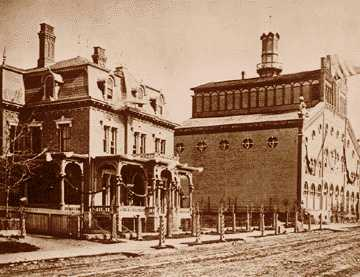
The original Stroh brewery at right, with the Stroh family home in foreground. Circa 1864

The Stroh family began brewing beer in a family-owned inn during the 18th century in Kirn, in the Rheinland-Pfalz region of western central Germany. In 1849, during the German Revolution, Stroh, who had learned the brewing trade from his father, emigrated to the United States. Bernhard Stroh established his brewery in Detroit in 1850 when he was 28 and immediately started producing Bohemian-style pilsner, which had been developed at the municipal brewery of Pilsen, Bohemia in 1842. In 1865, he purchased additional land and expanded his business and adopted the heraldic lion emblem from Kirn's most famous landmark, the Kyrburg Castle, and named his operation the Lion's Head Brewery. (The lion emblem is still visible in its advertising and product labels.)

Stroh's original beer selling operation consisted of a basement brewing operation with the beer sold door-to-door in a wheelbarrow. The new beer (Stroh's) sold door-to-door was a lighter lager beer, brewed in copper kettles.

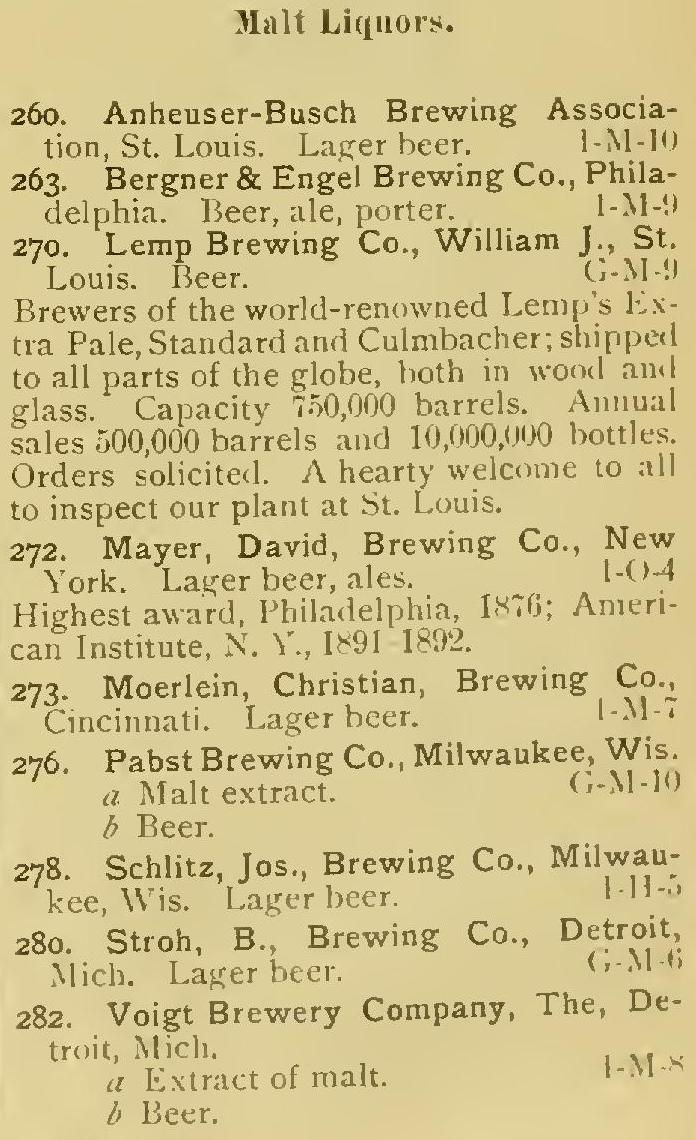
American Breweries with exhibits at the World's Columbian Exposition of 1893. Stroh Bohemian Lager Beer won the blue ribbon against these competitors

Bernhard Stroh Jr. took charge of the brewery on the death of his father, changing the brewery's name to the B. Stroh Brewing Company. With the introduction of pasteurization and refrigerated rail cars, Stroh was able to ship some of his beer as far as Florida and Massachusetts. In 1893 Stroh Bohemian Beer won a blue ribbon at the Columbian Exposition in Chicago. The company's name was changed to The Stroh Brewery Company in 1902. In 1905 Stroh's purchased the Ruoff Brewery, which happened to be next door on Gratiot Avenue. In 1908, Bernhard Stroh's brother Julius Stroh took over the brewery. After a tour of famous European breweries, he introduced the European fire-brewing method in the Stroh brewery. Common in Europe before World War I, the fire-brewing process uses a direct flame rather than steam to heat beer-filled copper kettles. The company claims that the resulting higher temperatures bring out more of the beer's flavor.

=== Prohibition ===
During Prohibition, Julius Stroh operated the business under the name The Stroh Products Company, producing near beer (beer with its alcohol extracted), birch beer, soft drinks, malt products, ice cream, and ice. Though production of most of these items ceased when Prohibition ended in 1933, a special unit of the brewery continued to make Stroh's Ice Cream (this facility remained in Detroit until February 2007, when the operation was moved to Belvidere, Illinois, though the distribution facility in Detroit still remains).

=== Growth and expansion ===
Upon Julius Stroh's death in 1939, his son Gari Stroh assumed the presidency. Gari's brother John succeeded him in 1950 and became Stroh's chairman in 1967. Gari's son Peter, who had joined the company following his graduation from Princeton University in 1951, became president in 1968.

In 1964, the company made its first move toward expansion when it bought the Goebel Brewing Company, a rival across the street. The company had decided it could no longer compete as a local brewer and was about to move into the national scene. One reason was a costly statewide strike in 1958 that halted Michigan beer production and allowed national brands to gain a foothold. When Peter Stroh took over the company in 1968, it still had not regained the market share lost in the strike ten years earlier.

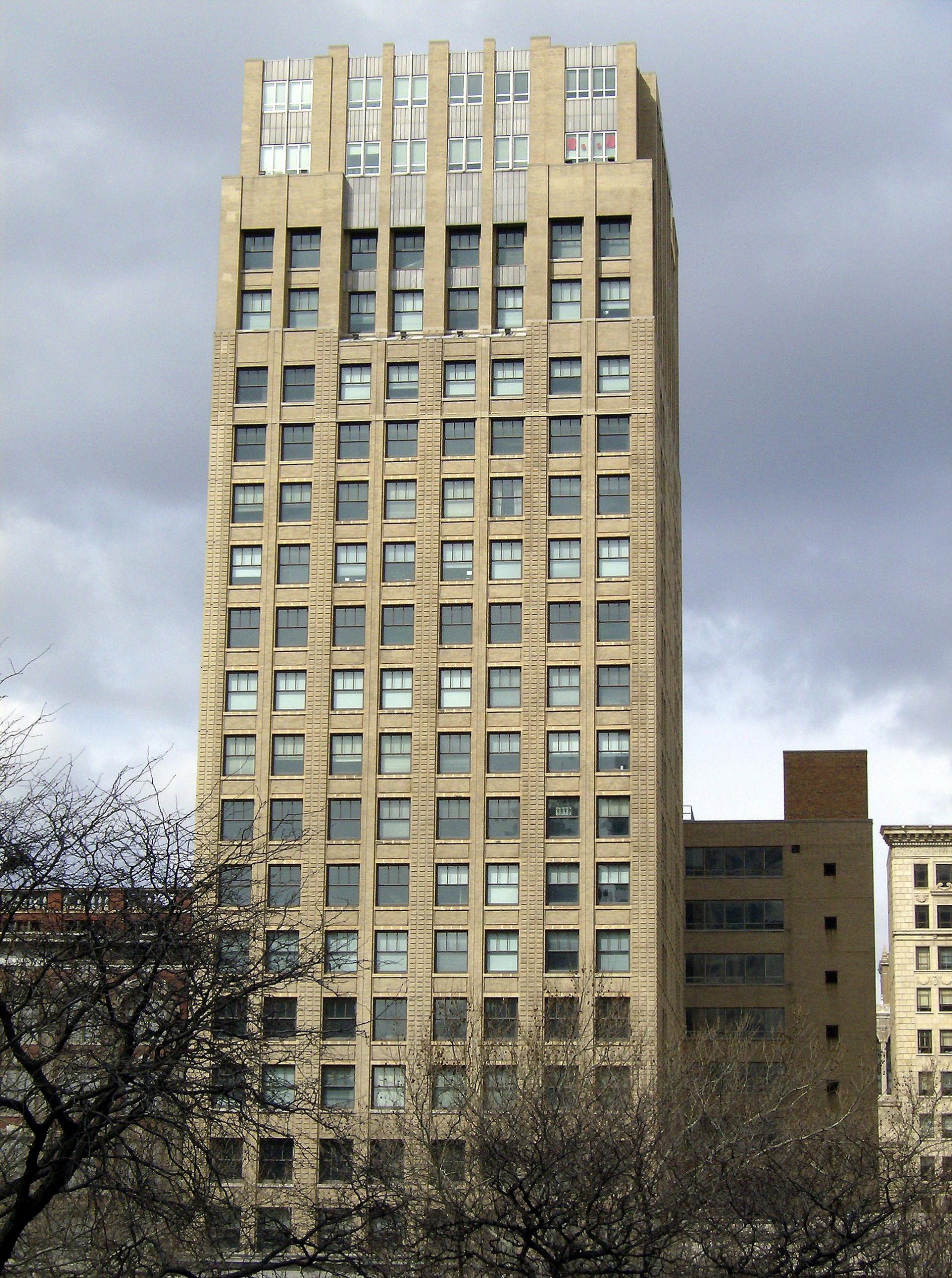
Stroh's head office (here pictured in 2007) used to be located at Grand Park Centre near Grand Circus Park and Woodward Avenue

Stroh ended a 40-year relationship with a local advertising agency for a large national agency and began targeting the larger national market. Led by creative director Murray Page, Stroh's came up with the slogan "The One Beer...", and by 1971, Stroh Brewery had moved from 15th to 13th place nationally. In 1972, it entered the top 10 for the first time. A year later it hit eighth place. Peter Stroh's willingness to depart from years of tradition introduced Stroh's to new markets, but the changes were hard to swallow for many of Stroh's fans and employees. Stroh broke the company's tradition of family management and recruited managers from companies such as Procter & Gamble and PepsiCo. He also introduced a light beer, Stroh Light.

By 1978, Stroh's served 17 states and produced 6.4 million US beer barrels (750,000 m^{3}) of beer. By this time, the original Detroit facility was 128 years old and had a capacity of seven million US beer barrels (820,000 m^{3}) annually. As it became difficult to make efficient shipments to new markets in the East, the company recognized that it required a new brewery. The F. & M. Schaefer Brewing Company had fallen victim to the Miller "low calorie" beer wars and Stroh's absorbed Schaefer's by purchasing all of its stock. In 1981, the combined breweries ranked seventh in beer sales. In addition, Stroh was able to take advantage of Schaefer's distributors in the northeastern part of the country. The acquisition also brought Stroh three new brands: Schaefer and Piels beers, and Schaefer's Cream Ale. The company now had a volume of over 40,000,000 US beer barrels (4,700,000 m^{3}) and 400 distributors in 28 states, Washington D.C., Puerto Rico, and other Caribbean islands.

In 1982, Stroh bid for 67 percent of the struggling Schlitz Brewing Company. By spring of that year, Stroh had purchased the entire company, making Stroh's the third largest brewing enterprise in America: it owned seven brewing plants and according to Forbes reached the market value of $700 million in 1988. During the takeover, Schlitz fought a fierce battle in the courts trying to remain independent. Schlitz finally accepted the takeover when Stroh raised its offer from an initial $16 per share to $17, and the U.S. Justice Department approved the acquisition once Stroh agreed to sell either Schlitz's Memphis or Winston-Salem breweries.

On February 8, 1985, Stroh announced that it would close its 135-year-old brewery on Detroit's east side. Chairman Peter Stroh said that the facility was simply outdated and had no room to expand. The structure was imploded the following year.

=== Turnaround and decline ===
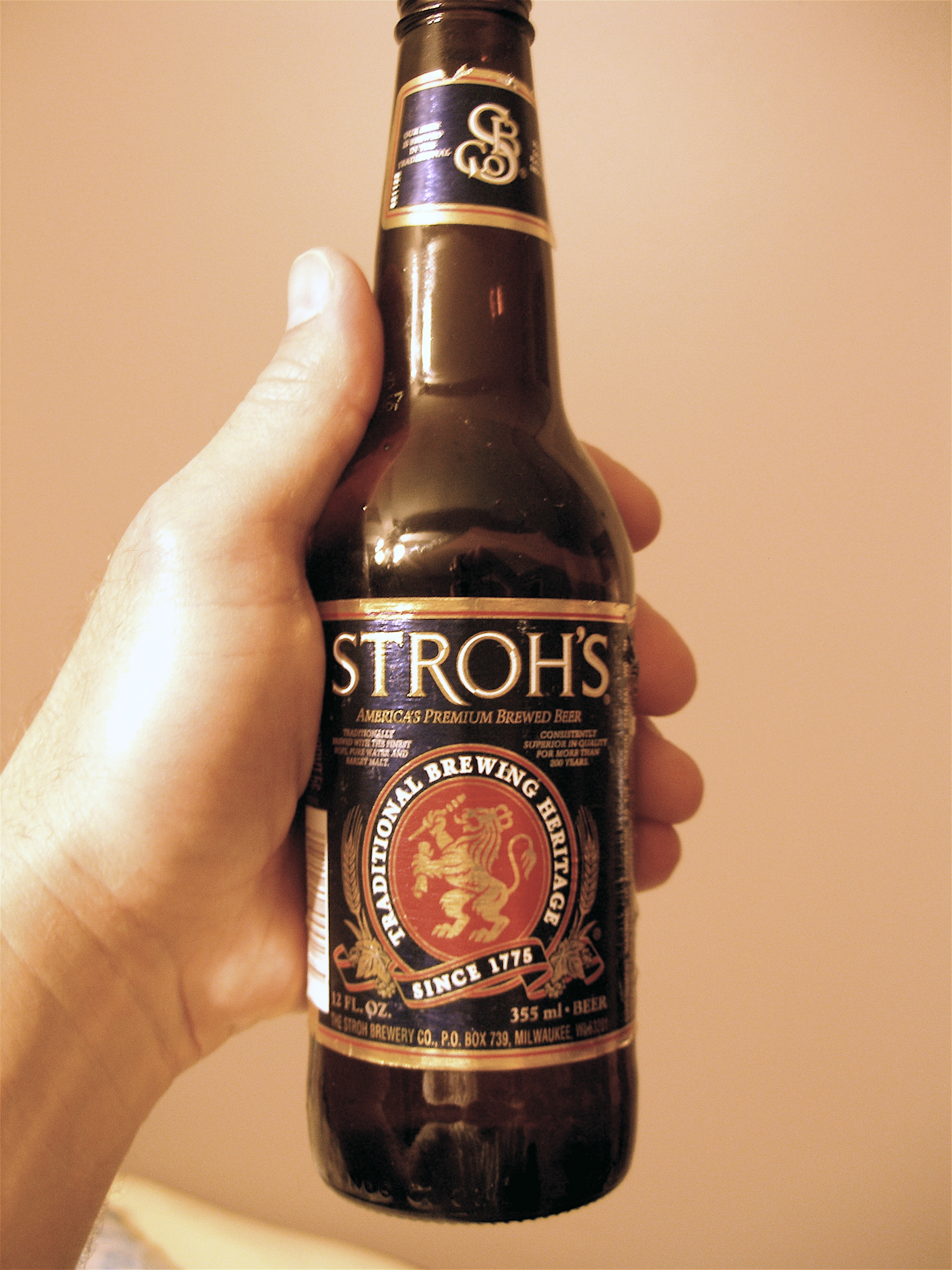
A Stroh's 12 U.S. fl oz (355 mL; 12.5 imp fl oz) bottle in 2009

A Stroh's 12 U.S. fl oz (355 mL; 12.5 imp fl oz) can in 2007

Stroh's had taken on a heavy debt burden to finance the Schlitz acquisition, but found itself unable to compete nationally with the likes of Anheuser-Busch, Miller, and Coors. Stroh's began to lose market share and profit margins, leading it to begin laying off employees. After Coors passed Stroh's in size, Peter Stroh agreed to sell the company's operations to Coors, but the deal ultimately fell through. In the aftermath, Stroh sought to address the company's cash flow problems through real estate development of the company's former headquarters and by diversifying into other beverages—such as White Mountain Cooler, a fruit-flavored drink with 5 percent alcohol, and Sundance sparkling-water fruit drink. These efforts met with little success, and Stroh's sold its ice cream operation to Dean Foods Company in 1988.

Stroh then implemented a three-pronged revitalization strategy: developing new products, brewing beer under contract for other brewers, and expanding overseas. The new product area was critical because the explosion in beer brand and types of beer in the 1990s undermined the market share for all established brands. Stroh's strategy when seeking to enter the market for a new type of beer was to extend one or more of its existing brands. In the increasingly popular non-alcoholic beer segment, for example, Old Milwaukee Non-Alcoholic was introduced in 1991, while Stroh's Non Alcoholic debuted in 1993. Old Milwaukee NA quickly became one of the top three selling non-alcoholic brews. In the ice beer category, Stroh launched Old Milwaukee Ice, Schlitz Ice, Schlitz Ice Light, Bull Ice, and Schaefer Ice, all in 1994. Another hot category in the early and mid-1990s was the packaged "draft" beer; Stroh made its presence felt in this category as well with Stroh's Draft Light, Old Milwaukee Genuine Draft, and Schlitz Genuine Draft.

Another important new product area was specialty beer. Its popularity in the 1990s was led by the emergence of hundreds of microbreweries and producing craft beers, not by the industry leaders. Stroh and the other giants sought to compete not by changing their flagship beers but buying microbreweries producing various specialty beers. Stroh did both. It purchased the Augsburger brand in 1989 and over the next several years developed and introduced both specialty and seasonal brews under the Augsburger name. In 1994, Stroh launched Red River Valley Select Red Lager, a regional premium specialty beer produced by a division of the company's St. Paul, Minnesota, brewery called Northern Plains Brewing Company. Two years later, Red River Honey Brown Ale was introduced.

The international market provided growth opportunities for Stroh that were very limited in the hyper-competitive U.S. market. In 1986, the company created Stroh International, Inc., initially targeting Canada, India, Japan, Mexico, and Russia. From 1992 through 1995, Stroh's international sales grew each year at rates exceeding 50 percent. In 1994, the company entered into a licensing agreement with Rajasthan Breweries, Ltd. (located outside Delhi) to produce, distribute, and market Stroh's and Stroh's Super Strong beers in India, an industry first, as was being sold in cans. Rajasthan Breweries sold Stroh's all over India; the brand is still recognized and remembered in India despite it not having been sold there for several years. The following year, the company reached an agreement with Sapporo Breweries Ltd. of Tokyo whereby Sapporo began distributing Stroh's beer nationwide in Japan. By 1995, exports accounted for more than 10 percent of overall Stroh sales.

In early 1995, William Henry assumed Peter Stroh's CEO position to become the first non-Stroh family member to hold that position for the company. The following year Stroh finally landed a long-sought-after target when it acquired the G. Heileman Brewing Company of La Crosse, Wisconsin for about $290 million. The purchase brought more than 30 brands to the Stroh family, many recently acquired by Heilman during the intense industry consolidation still underway, including Colt 45 malt liquor, which when combined with Schlitz Malt Liquor, gave Stroh more than half of the malt liquor market.

Stroh had borrowed heavily to grow, and while it increased its market share, it had not increased its cash flow in a worsening market.

In a bid for cash, Stroh Canada, was sold to Sleeman Breweries in Guelph, Ontario in 1999. Sleeman, a division of Sapporo Breweries, gained Canadian rights to manufacture and distribute a folio of brands which included Stroh's, Old Milwaukee and Pabst.

An attempt to rejuvenate the core Stroh's brand in the US backfired, causing the steepest decline in American brewing history. Stock prices fell, and dwindling income had to be diverted to service an increasingly burdensome debt. Stroh's proved unable to withstand the pressures of the larger brewers and chose to sell off its labels rather than face bankruptcy.

=== Acquisition ===
State of Michigan Historical Site marker commemorating the site of Stroh's Brewery of Detroit

The end finally came on February 8, 1999, when Stroh announced that the 149-year-old brewer was selling its labels to the Pabst Brewing Company and Miller Brewing Company. John Stroh III, then company president and chief executive, said of the decision to sell: "Emotionally, it was an extremely difficult one to make, knowing that it would impact our loyal employees, and recognizing that it would mean the end of our family's centuries old brewing tradition that had become, in essence, an important part of our identity." The Stroh family lost over $700 million, decimating its fortune.

After the company's dissolution in 2000, some Stroh brands were discontinued, while others were purchased by other breweries. The Pabst Brewing Company acquired the most Stroh/Heileman brands. As of that year it produced Colt .45 malt liquor, Lone Star, Schaefer, Schlitz, Schmidt's, Old Milwaukee, Old Style (under contract with City Brewery, the original Heileman facility in La Crosse, WI), Stroh's, and St. Ides. The Miller Brewing Company got Mickey's Malt Liquor and Henry Weinhard's. Most other Stroh/Heileman brands disappeared after 2000.

As of 2009 some Stroh brands, such as Old Milwaukee and Pabst Blue Ribbon, were still brewed in Canada by Sleeman Breweries Ltd.

=== Brand revival ===
In August 2016, Pabst partnered with a brewery in Detroit's Corktown neighborhood called Brew Detroit to begin brewing batches of Stroh's Bohemian-Style Pilsner, a beer derived from an original 1850s Stroh's recipe. The first batch was shipped to area bars, restaurants, and liquor stores on August 22, with special events all across metropolitan Detroit on the 26th.

On May 4, 2018, Stroh's released its Perseverance IPA, as a Michigan exclusive.

A version of Stroh's brewed elsewhere (evidently by Pabst) was set to be reintroducted to the Detroit area in 2022.

== Advertising ==
=== Commercials ===
Stroh TV commercials included the following:

- The 1970s featured several commercials with references to Stroh's being the choice of "real beer lovers". Frequently heard on television commercials was the slogan, "From one beer lover to another, Stroh's." One such commercial featured a ragged man crawling across a desert who happens upon a campsite. After asking for a Stroh's and being offered "some nice cold water" instead, the man says, "No thanks, I really had a thirst for a Stroh's." As the man crawls away, a camper muses, "Now there goes a real beer lover."
- In the 1980s, Stroh's was known for its humorous "Alex the Dog" commercials, where Alex would fetch a Stroh's from the refrigerator for its owner. One commercial ended with Alex lapping a liquid after pouring two glasses of Stroh's, with his owner shouting "Alex, you'd better be drinking your water!".
- 1980s commercials for Stroh Light often featured a subject who wins a competition, such as darts or a poker game, with the tagline, "Looks like a Stroh Light night."
- Comedian Brian Regan describes being booed out of a hockey arena during a publicity campaign in which he was the campaign manager for Alex the Dog for president.

=== Sponsorships ===
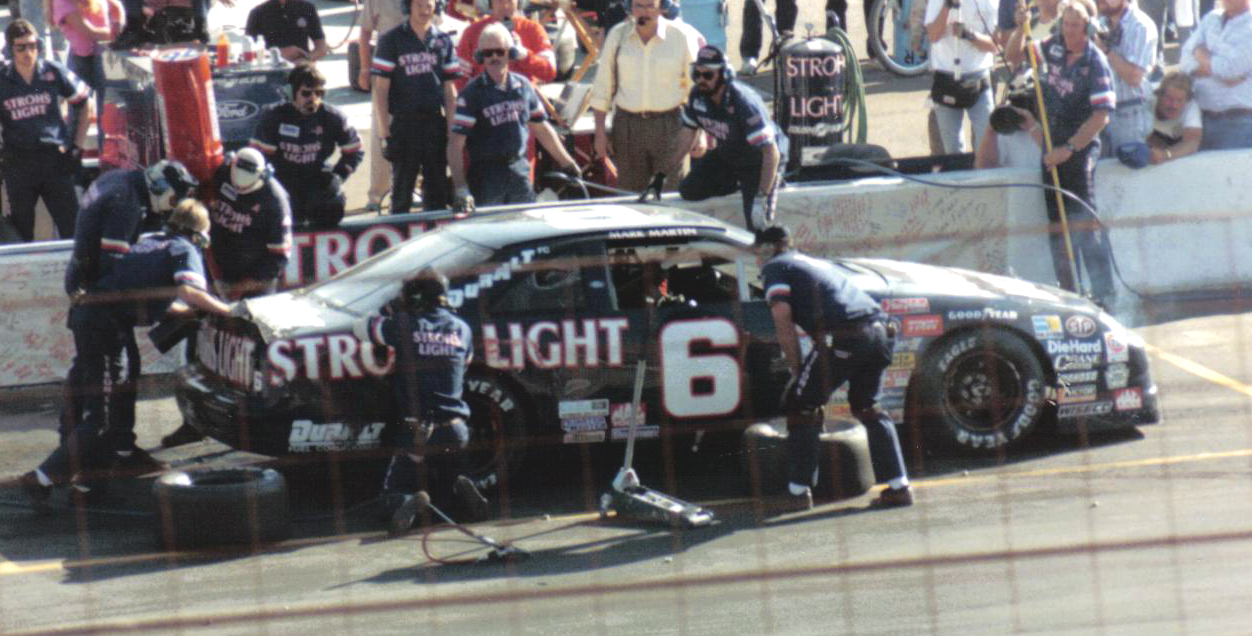
1989 Winston Cup car on pit road at Phoenix

Locally in Michigan, the company was the longtime sponsor for the Detroit Tigers baseball team's radio broadcasts, a relationship that began in 1960.

In the 1980s, the company also turned to corporate sponsorship to gain needed national publicity. Stroh was a sponsor of the 1982 World's Fair in Knoxville, Tennessee, an event that strengthened Stroh's new national standing considerably. For many years Stroh had received little television exposure because of an agreement between the major networks and Anheuser-Busch and Miller Brewing Company which allowed the two top brewers exclusive advertising rights. Stroh fought the agreement and in 1983 was allotted advertising time on ABC's Monday Night Baseball, on two NBC boxing events, and on other popular U.S. television sports shows. Confronted with nearly prohibitive network costs, the company began "The Stroh Circle of Sports" on cable television and independent stations. The program featured live events with reporting and analysis. For increased publicity opportunities, Stroh also turned to such sports as hockey—which had been overlooked by Anheuser and Miller—and sponsored broadcasts of National Hockey League games on the USA cable network. The company also sponsored the 1984 Dallas Grand Prix, an event considered an important boost for Stroh's international name recognition. "High Rollers", a contest for amateur bowlers, was also developed and sponsored by the company. Stroh's most popular non-sports promotion during this period was the "Schlitz Rocks America" concert series. It also sponsored NASCAR legend Mark Martin in the Winston Cup Series during the 1988 and 1989 seasons. Hall of Fame center Mario Lemieux signed a two-year deal with Stroh's on October 20, 1997, that allowed Lemieux to appear in print ads and in public appearances but allowed him to remain away from television ads. Lemieux's image was also featured on several Stroh's commemorative cans.

== Alcohol content/nutritional value ==
type	alcohol by volume	energy (per 12 fl. oz.)		
type	alcohol by volume	Carb	Cal	kJ
Stroh's	4.5% (5% in Canada)	13	143	600
Stroh's Light	3.5%	7	113	470
Stroh's Bohemian-Style Pilsner	5.5%	--	170	710

== See also ==
- List of defunct breweries in the United States
- Izze (drink)
