= Alex the Dog =

Advertising mascot

- Other name: Banjo
- Breed: Golden Retriever and Irish Setter
- Sex: Male
- Born: 1984
- Died: 1989
- Cause of death: Cancer
- Years active: 1984–1989
- Known for: Advertising mascot for Stroh's

Alex the Dog was the advertising mascot for Stroh's beer in the 1980s.

Alex's most famous advertisement depicted him retrieving beer for a man playing poker before the sound of Alex drinking it is heard offscreen. The character of Alex drove a hot rod shaped like a beer can. Stroh's also created merchandise such as shirts and posters depicting Alex. In the 1988 United States presidential election, Stroh's launched a mock presidential campaign for Alex, with comedian Brian Regan serving as his campaign manager. Alex and Regan traveled to bars throughout the United States to advertise Stroh's and encourage people to register to vote.

The popularity of Alex caused Stroh's to fear that their product would be too closely associated with dogs, so they ceased using him in advertising campaigns. This left the market open for Spuds MacKenzie, the dog mascot of Bud Light beer.

== See also ==
- List of individual dogs
