= Inauguration of Ronald Reagan =

Inauguration of Ronald Reagan may refer to:

- First inauguration of Ronald Reagan, 1981
- Second inauguration of Ronald Reagan, 1985

== See also ==
- The full text of Ronald Reagan's First Inaugural Address at Wikisource
- The full text of Ronald Reagan's Second Inaugural Address at Wikisource
