= Wine cooler =

Alcoholic beverage made from wine and fruit juice

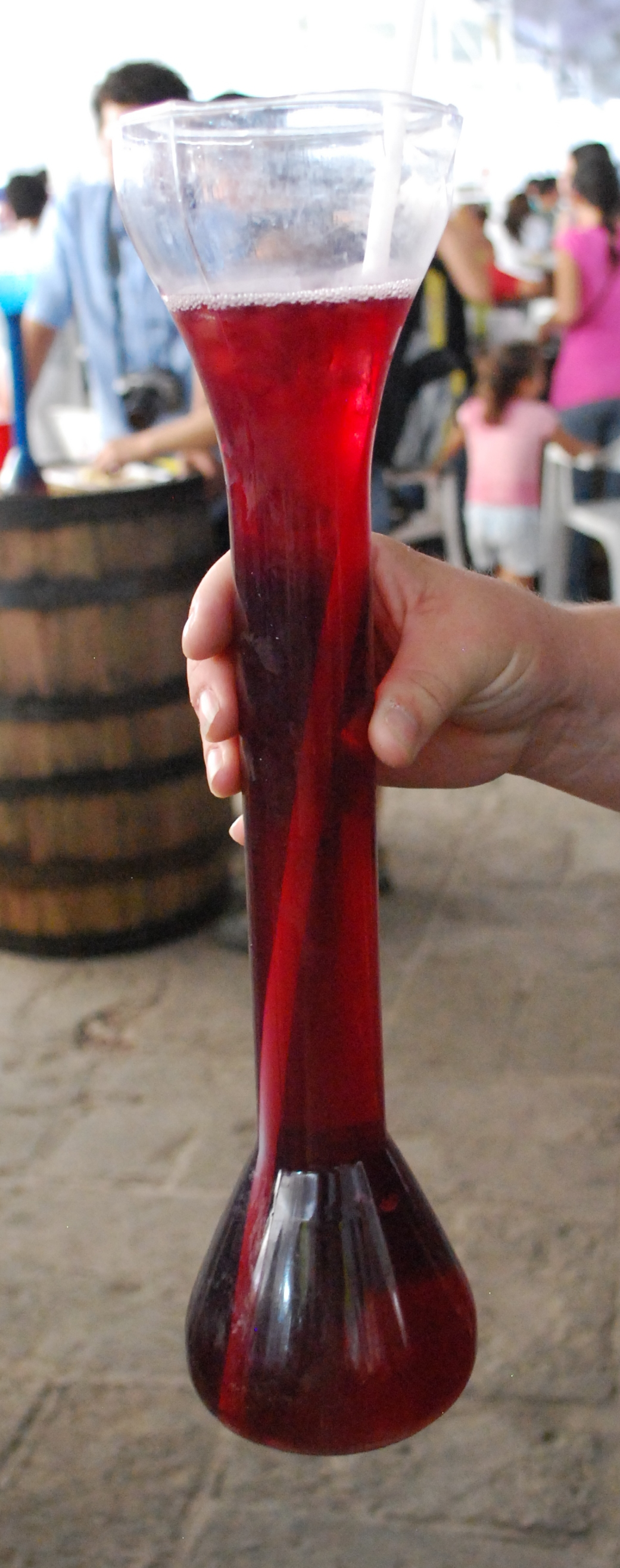
Wine cooler served in a half yard of ale glass

A wine cooler is an alcoholic beverage made from wine and fruit juice, often in combination with a carbonated beverage and sugar.

== History ==
Wine coolers were first marketed in California in 1976, with the introduction of California Cooler. During their peak in the mid-late 1980s they made up 20 percent of all wine sold in the United States, before fading in the 1990s due to heavy excise tax rises on wines.

In Germany, wine coolers became popular in 2004, when the German government imposed an extra duty on alcopops (pre-mixed spirits) of 0.80 to 0.90 euro per bottle, effective 1 August 2004. To circumvent higher taxation, some German producers have switched to wine coolers, which are being marketed in the same way as alcopops.

== Commercially-made ==
Traditionally home-made, wine coolers have been bottled and sold by commercial distributors since the early 1980s, especially in areas where their alcohol content, lower than wine, causes them to come under less restrictive laws than table wines.

Because most of the flavor in the wine is obscured by the fruit and sugar, the wine used in wine coolers tends to be of the cheapest available grade. Since January 1991, when the United States Congress quintupled the excise tax on wine, most producers of wine coolers dropped wine from the mix, substituting it with cheaper malt liquor. These malt-based coolers, while sometimes referred to as "wine coolers", are in a different category of beverage—sometimes called "malt beverage", "malternative", or just "cooler". Bartles & Jaymes refers to its malt beverage as a "flavored malt cooler".

== See also ==
- Malternative
- Mimosa (cocktail)
- Kir (cocktail)
- Sangria
- Spritzer
- Tinto de verano
