= Spuds MacKenzie =

Dog mascot of Bud Light beer

Advertisement of Spuds Mackenzie.

Spuds MacKenzie ("The Original Party Animal") is an English Bull Terrier dog character used for an extensive advertising campaign marketing Bud Light beer in the late 1980s. The Spuds MacKenzie mascot and campaign was the idea of a 23-year-old art director, Jon Moore. At the time, he was working at Needham, Harper, and Steers, a Chicago advertising agency. The dog first showed up in a Bud Light Super Bowl XXI advertisement in 1987.

Shortly after Spuds' rise to fame, it was learned that the dog, portrayed as male in the advertisements, was actually female. The dog was portrayed by a female Bull Terrier named Honey Tree Evil Eye, or Evie for short. Evie was from Woodstock, Illinois, and lived in North Riverside, Illinois, with her owner's family, where she died in 1993. Anheuser-Busch sponsored many dogs from the kennel in Illinois where Evie was born.

In the advertisements, Spuds is portrayed as the life of the party, partaking in many activities, such as drumming, skiing, and other extreme sports. He is always the center of attention, being surrounded by many attractive young women.

== Controversy and retirement ==
The Spuds McKenzie advertising campaign was not without its share of controversy. Politicians and advocacy groups criticized the advertisements for promoting consumption of alcohol by children. Soon after the advertisements first aired in 1987, Senator Strom Thurmond began his own media campaign, claiming that the beer maker was using Spuds to appeal to children in order to get them interested in their product at an early age. By Christmas 1987, more legal action resulted from Bud Light's use of advertisements featuring Spuds dressed as Santa Claus. Advertisements for alcohol beverages cannot make reference to Santa Claus in states such as Ohio.

In 2017, the character appeared in Bud Light's Super Bowl LI advertisement (voiced by Carl Weathers) as a ghost who helps a man named Brian reunite with his friends. The advertisement was a homage to Charles Dickens' A Christmas Carol. The house number in this advertisement's last segment is 1989, the year Spuds was retired.

== See also ==
- Alex the Dog
- List of individual dogs
- Bullseye (mascot)
