= Morning in America =

1984 political campaign advertisement for Ronald Reagan

- Language: English
- Release date: 1984
- Written by: Hal Riney
- Directed by: John Pytka
- Country: United States

"Prouder, Stronger, Better", commonly referred to by the name "Morning in America", is a 1984 political campaign television commercial, known for its opening line, "It's morning again in America." The ad was part of that year's presidential campaign of Republican Party candidate Ronald Reagan. It featured a montage of images of Americans going to work, and a calm, optimistic narration that suggested that the improvements to the U.S. economy since the 1980 election were due to Reagan's policies. It also asked voters why they would want to return to the pre-Reagan policies of Democrats.

The phrase "It's morning again in America" is used both as a literal statement (people are shown going to work as they would in the morning), and as a metaphor for renewal.

== Details ==
Full text of the ad:

It's morning again in America. Today more men and women will go to work than ever before in our country's history. With interest rates at about half the record highs of 1980, nearly 2,000 families today will buy new homes, more than at any time in the past four years. This afternoon, 6,500 young men and women will be married, and with inflation at less than half of what it was just four years ago, they can look forward with confidence to the future. It's morning again in America, and under the leadership of President Reagan, our country is prouder and stronger and better. Why would we ever want to return to where we were less than four short years ago?

The ad was written and narrated by ad man Hal Riney, who also wrote and narrated Reagan's resonant "Bear in the woods" ad (titled "Bear") as well as his "America's Back" ad. To many, his rich, avuncular voice represented wholesomeness and authenticity. Bernie Vangrin of Hal Riney & Partners was the Art Director of the ad, which was directed and filmed by John Pytka of Levine/Pytka Productions.

=== Locations ===
"Morning In America" was filmed in Petaluma, California.

== Resonance ==
This advertisement won industry awards and praise from the political and advertising world. Republican strategist Dan Schnur said of Riney's work: "Most political advertising hits viewers over the head, while his work makes just as strong a point but in a less confrontational and a more soothing manner."

=== Adaptations and references ===
During Super Bowl LIII, Hulu aired a trailer for the third season of The Handmaid's Tale that was inspired by "Morning in America". It used similar narration to the original commercial (with a particular focus on women and their newborn children), but is interrupted by scenes of the series' dystopian and totalitarian Republic of Gilead—where women are required to act as sex slaves—and concluding with lead character June Osbourne / Offred stating "Wake up America, morning's over."

=== 2016 presidential election ===
During the 2016 presidential primaries, Republican Party candidates Marco Rubio and Ted Cruz both referenced "morning in America" rhetoric in attempts to reflect the politics and spirit of Reagan. Rubio's "Morning Again in America" television ad, which features montage footage of everyday American life in both cities and suburbs, drew widespread criticism for opening with a shot of Vancouver, British Columbia, Canada. Ted Cruz used variations of the phrase throughout his campaign, often at concluding or climactic points in his speeches. After winning the Republican caucus in Iowa on February 1, 2016, Cruz said: "Tonight Iowa has proclaimed to the world: morning is coming." Cruz used the phrase again in a speech in South Carolina as he competed with Rubio for second place in the state's Republican primary election on February 20: "We can bring back morning in America", he declared. Years earlier, Cruz had used a similar line when he spoke at the 2014 Conservative Political Action Conference (CPAC): "We will bring back morning in America. That's why we're here and that's the future for the young and everybody else in this country."

In Hillary Clinton's Democratic nomination acceptance speech, referencing Donald Trump's acceptance speech the previous week, she said: "He's taken the Republican Party a long way from 'Morning in America' to 'Midnight in America'. He wants us to fear the future and fear each other."

=== 2020 presidential election ===
During the 2020 presidential campaign, The Lincoln Project released the ad "Mourning in America" with themes related to deaths from COVID-19 and the debatable inaction of Pres. Donald Trump; versions featuring specific states were released as "Mourning in Iowa", "Mourning in Florida", "Mourning in Pennsylvania" and "Mourning in Ohio", as well as a version called "Mourning in Republican Party" that laments the party's change of direction.

=== 2026 midterm election ===
Following the 2026 midterm election, New York City mayor Zohran Mamdani released a video titled "It's morning again in America.," reflecting on the results of the election and the numerous Democratic wins, stating that the American people made their voice heard and that it was time for the newly elected Democrats to work to deliver on their promises. He concluded the video with the titular phrase.

== See also ==
- 1984 United States presidential election
- "Bear in the woods"
- Make America Great Again
