= Hal Riney =

American advertising executive (1932–2008)

- Born: Hal Patrick Riney; July 17, 1932; Seattle, Washington, U.S.
- Died: March 24, 2008 (aged 75); San Francisco, California, U.S.
- Education: University of Washington
- Occupation: Advertising executive
- Known for: Morning in America

Hal Patrick Riney (July 17, 1932 – March 24, 2008) was an American advertising executive.

== Early life ==
Riney grew up in Longview, Washington. He graduated from the University of Washington in 1954 with a degree in art. Riney was a member of Theta Chi fraternity.

== Career ==
After serving two years in the United States Army doing public relations in Italy, he joined BBDO San Francisco, moving from the mail room to head art director and finally creative director in 1968.

In 1970, he hired Paul Williams to write a song for a Crocker Bank commercial, which was later recorded by The Carpenters and became the hit "We've Only Just Begun". In 1976 he joined Ogilvy & Mather, building their West Coast office from scratch. In 1984, Riney created and did voiceover for the noted "Morning in America" and "Bear in the Woods" television commercials for the successful Ronald Reagan 1984 presidential re-election campaign. After creating the Bartles & Jaymes campaign for E & J Gallo Winery, Riney resigned the account, but soon was awarded the launch campaign for Saturn Corporation. The agency was sold to Publicis in 1998.

Founder of the advertising agency Hal Riney & Partners (now Publicis & Hal Riney), Riney was named #30 on the Advertising Age 100 people of the 20th century. He was inducted into the Advertising Hall of Fame in 2001.

== Personal life ==
Riney was married five times.

Riney died at age 75 in 2008, from cancer, at his home in San Francisco.
