= Dick Snider =

American journalist (1921–2004)

Richard Snider Sr. (March 20, 1921 – November 20, 2004) was an American newspaper columnist, oil executive, television producer, and founder of NCAA Films (now called NCAA Productions). He is most widely known for his humor column in the Topeka Capital-Journal, and he was campaign manager for former University of Oklahoma football coach Bud Wilkinson's failed 1964 US Senate campaign. He later joked that "We were never ahead despite Bud having 95 percent name recognition in the state. Man, I could make people forget Santa Claus."

== Early life ==
Snider was born on March 20, 1921, in Oakwood, Oklahoma, where his father, Daniel William Snider, owned a pharmacy. As a young boy, he and his family were forced to leave Oakwood by the Ku Klux Klan, who burned a cross on their lawn for being Roman Catholic. He attended St. Gregory's High School in Shawnee, OK, and went on to study at Oklahoma State University and Columbus School of Law. After briefly working for the Federal Bureau of Investigation, he served in the United States Navy during World War II teaching aircraft mechanics.

== Career ==
Snider held a variety of jobs throughout his life, working in journalism, politics, sports, and the oil industry. He got his start in journalism in the 1950s as a sports editor for the Topeka Capital-Journal. After being promoted to managing editor, he went on to work for president John F. Kennedy as administrator of the President's Council on Physical Fitness and Sports. From there, he founded NCAA films, where he produced the television show "College Football," the first Sunday morning show to nationally broadcast college football highlights. With his background in communications, he was then hired to be Vice President of Communications for Vickers Oil in Wichita, Kansas. He retired in 1985, returning to the newspaper business to write a thrice-weekly column for the Topeka Capital-Journal for the next seventeen years. His column became well known for its cynical humor. Though usually aimed at people in power, his comical attacks were often directed at friends, family, and himself. In 2002, the column was picked up by the Metro News, where he wrote until his death in 2004.

== Death ==
Snider died of cancer on November 20, 2004, at his home in Topeka, Kansas. Because of his popular mockery of Topeka-based Westboro Baptist Church, the church picketed his funeral. He was survived by his wife, five children, and nine grandchildren.
