= Bartles & Jaymes =

American brand of fruit-flavored and malt beverages

Bartles & Jaymes original flavor

Bartles & Jaymes is a flavored wine cooler and malt beverage line produced by the E & J Gallo Winery in the United States, introduced in 1985, and available in various fruit flavors.

Initially producing wine-based coolers, Bartles & Jaymes switched to solely malt-based coolers in 1991, when the federal excise tax on wine was raised. In 2019 Gallo resumed making wine-based coolers, although the product line remains mostly malt-based.

== TV commercials ==
The product line is remembered for its folksy television commercials, created by Hal Riney, which ran from 1984 to 1991. Two older gentleman characters, Frank Bartles and Ed Jaymes, sat on a front porch and related their new discoveries or projects on which they were working. The characters were patterned after the winery's founders, Ernest and Julio Gallo. Occasionally ads would be a twist on the idea of senior citizens or folksiness, such as having the pair fly an old-fashioned biplane over a beach, then airdrop crates of their product which were received by grateful young party animals. Bartles did all the talking, and ended each commercial with the tagline "and thank you for your support."

David Rufkahr played Frank Bartles and Dick Maugg played Ed Jaymes. Neither Rufkahr nor Maugg was an actor. Rufkahr, a career Air Force veteran and cattle rancher from Redmond, Oregon, won the job in a talent search. Maugg was a general contractor from Santa Rosa, California.

Rufkahr died of a heart attack in 1996, in Bend, Oregon, aged 61. Maugg died of cancer in Santa Rosa in 2015..
