= Haffenreffer =

Haffenreffer is a German surname. It may apply to:

== Organizations ==
- Haffenreffer Brewery, a former brewer in Jamaica Plain, Massachusettses, established in 1870
- Haffenreffer Museum of Anthropology, a teaching and research museum at Brown University
- Narragansett Brewing Company, a Rhode Island brewer that acquired Heffenreffer Brewing in 1965

== People ==
- Rudolf F. Haffenreffer, a Rhode Island industrialist and philanthropist
