= Cynthia Fisher =

American businesswoman, entrepreneur and corporate board director

Cynthia A. Fisher
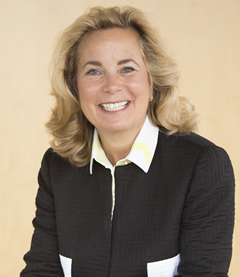
- Born: January 16, 1961 (age 65)
- Occupations: Businesswoman, healthcare policy advocate

Cynthia Fisher (born January 16, 1961) is an American businesswoman and public policy advocate. She was a pioneer in the stem cell industry, founding the cord blood stem cell banking company, ViaCord, Inc., in 1993. She serves as a director of The Boston Beer Company, which was founded by her husband, Jim Koch. She is also active in public advocacy relating to price transparency in healthcare.

== Career ==
=== Healthcare technology ===
Fisher began her career at IBM in sales and marketing in 1983. After receiving her MBA in 1990 from Harvard Business School, she joined Haemonetics and was marketing manager of the Blood Bank Division. In 1993, Fisher set up ViaCord, Inc., a company that tests, types, freezes and stores the umbilical cord blood of newborns for its potential use in treating some cancers, blood disorders, and genetic diseases. She served as CEO from ViaCord’s inception until 2000.

In 2000, Fisher co-founded and was president of ViaCell, a cellular medicines company. ViaCord then became a division of ViaCell. ViaCell went public in 2005 at a $260 million valuation. Fisher’s role in the "rearing" of ViaCell was the subject of a Harvard Business School case study. PerkinElmer acquired ViaCell in 2007 for $300 million for its ViaCord business. Fisher served on the Board of Directors of ViaCord and ViaCell. From 2002 to 2004, she was Chair of the Board of the Massachusetts Biotechnology Council.

=== Advisory and director roles ===
Since 2000, Fisher has founded, advised, and invested in several privately held enterprises. She mentors entrepreneurs and is a guest lecturer at several graduate schools of business (Harvard Business School, Brandeis University, Bentley University, and Boston University).

In 2011, she set up WaterRev, LLC, an investment firm focused on companies with novel technologies that enable sustainable practices of water use. Through 2018, Fisher was on the board of Water.org, the nonprofit organization founded by Gary White and Matt Damon.

Fisher became a director in 2012 of The Boston Beer Company, the maker of Samuel Adams Beer, Angry Orchard Cider, and Twisted Tea. She was the first woman on the company's board, but her appointment was criticized because she was married to Jim Koch, the company's founder.

Since 2015, Fisher has been a director of Easterly Government Properties, a real estate investment trust focused on Class A commercial properties leased to U. S. Government agencies.

=== Policy advocacy ===
In 2016, Fisher co-founded FitMoney, Inc., a nonprofit organization providing K-12 curriculum for financial literacy.

In 2017, Fisher was appointed by Speaker of the House Paul Ryan to the Health Information Technology Advisory Committee.

The same year, Fisher set up PatientRightsAdvocate.org, a nonprofit organization that advocates for patients and employers to access price transparency in healthcare, to reduce the cost of care for patients, employers, and the government. Her commentaries advocating for price discovery have been reported in The Boston Globe, U.S. News & World Report, Issues & Insights, and RealClearHealth.

In 2018, Fisher was appointed to the Board of Directors of the National Park Foundation.

== Education ==
Fisher received an MBA from Harvard Business School. She has a B.S. in Biophysics from Ursinus College, where she was awarded an Honorary Doctorate in Science in 2006.

== Personal life ==
Fisher is married to Jim Koch.
