= Harry M. Rubin =

American businessman (born 1952)

- Education: Stanford University (B.A.); Harvard Business School (M.B.A)
- Occupation: Co-founder of Boston Beer Company

Harry Meyer Rubin (born 1952) is an American beverage and entertainment executive. He is known for being one of the founders of Boston Beer Company, the producer of Samuel Adams beer.

== Career ==
Rubin served as Vice President of Strategic Planning and Video Coordination at RCA. In 1984, he became one of the founding partners of Boston Beer Company, which produces Samuel Adams. In 1991, Rubin and his wife, a former marketing director at Columbia Pictures, co-created the board game, "Let's Buy Hollywood". The game is similar in structure to Monopoly, players had to build an entertainment empire, incorporating all aspects of the industry. In 1994, Rubin became Chief Financial Officer of GT Interactive and later Executive Vice President and General Manager of International Division and Business Affairs for the company. In 1998, he became President of GT Interactive's International Division. In 1999, GT Interactive was purchased by Infogrames and Rubin became Senior Executive Vice President and Chief Operating Officer. In 2006, he became a board director of Synthesis Energy Systems Inc. (Nasdaq: SYMX). He is currently Chairman of Henmead Enterprises, Inc.

== Education ==
He attended Stanford University and Harvard Business School.
