= Gregg A. Tanner =

Gregg A. Tanner was the chief executive officer of Dean Foods Company from 2012 through 2016. Tanner died on January 24, 2019.

== Early years ==
Tanner grew up in Dodge City, Kansas and graduated with a BS from Kansas State University.

== Career ==
From 1980 to 1987, Tanner worked as a Project Engineer for Ralston Purina.

In 2001, Suiza Dairy bought Dean Foods and changed its name to the Dean Foods Company. From November 2007, he served as the chief supply chain officer of Dean Foods and from January 2012, he served as the president of Fresh Dairy Direct for the company.

== Board memberships ==
Tanner was a board member of the Dean Food Company, having joined in November 2012, and of the Boston Beer Company Inc., having joined in October 2007.
