= Angry Orchard =

American cider company

Coordinates: 41.59001°N 74.22406°W

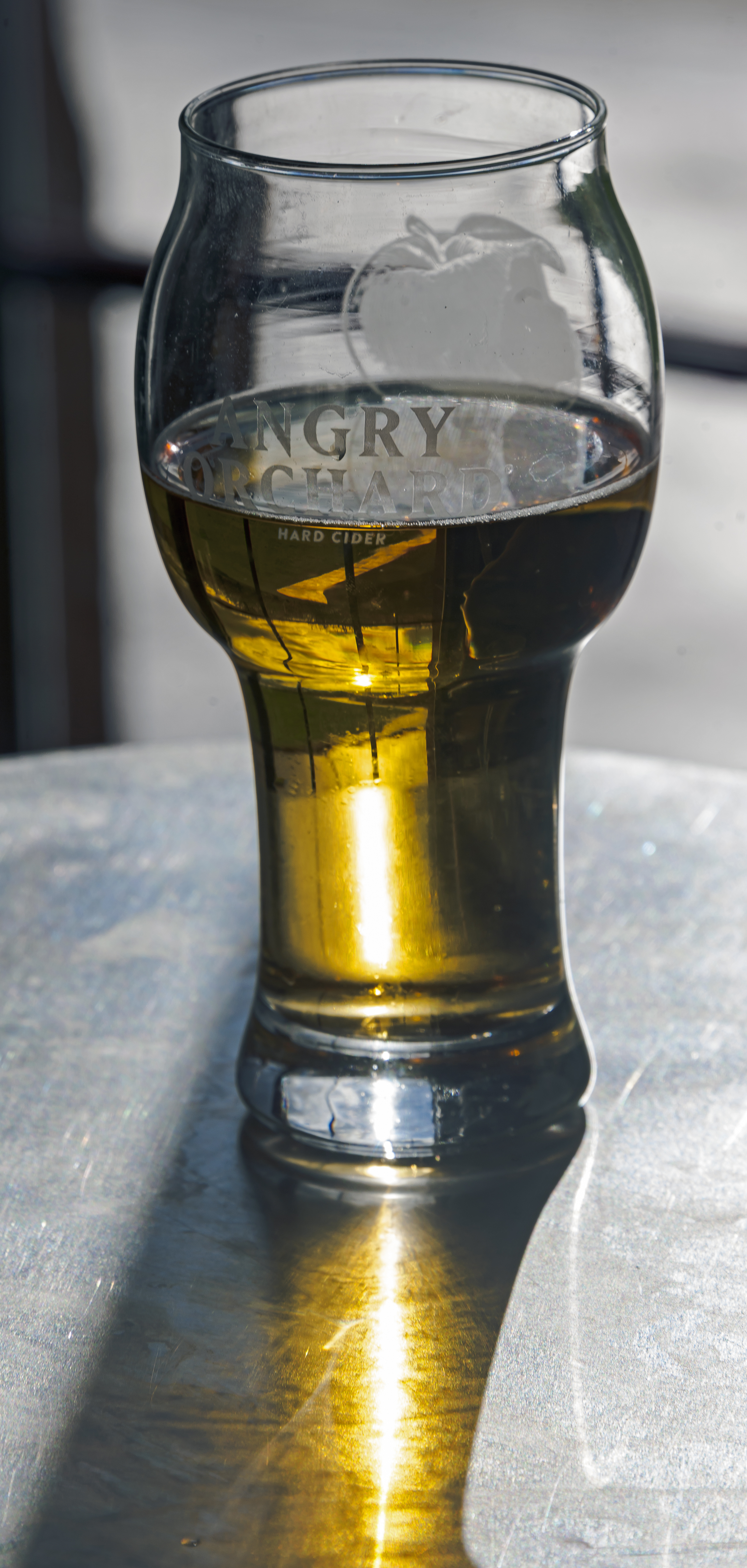
- Cider in a tasting glass at the company's Walden facility
- Interactive map of Angry Orchard
- Type: Hard cider company
- Location: Walden, New York, United States
- Owner: Boston Beer Company
- Website: Official website

Angry Orchard is a hard cider company located near Walden, New York, United States, owned by the Boston Beer Company. It makes hard cider using apples from its own 60-acre orchard located in the Hudson Valley, New York. The company is credited for making cider a widely-distributed drink in restaurants and retail chains in the US, paving the way for the development of the regional ciders market.

== History ==
The "orchard" in the name Angry Orchard refers to a 60-acre orchard in the middle of the Hudson Valley-based cidery. "Angry" is an allusion to cider apples often being ugly in comparison to hand apples, and their acidic and tannic taste.

In its first year, the cider was only available in New England, Colorado, Maryland, and New York. In 2012, it was introduced nationwide (with its three flagship flavors, Crisp Apple, Traditional Dry, and Apple Ginger). By June 2013, Angry Orchard overtook Woodchuck as most-sold cider in the US. It quickly captured 40% of the United States hard cider market, rising to 50% by 2014 and comprising 20% of the Boston Brewing Company's output.

In 2016, Angry Orchard teamed with treehouse builder Pete Nelson to create a treehouse tasting room on Animal Planet's Treehouse Masters. In March 2019, Angry Orchard launched their Cider+Food App, a first-of-its-kind augmented reality experience that brings cider and food pairings to life. Users of the app can scan their phones over Angry Orchard's bottles of their core styles—Crisp Apple, Rosé, Easy Apple and Pear, with the digital experience guided by head cidermaker Ryan Burk.

In 2020, Angry Orchard was the top-selling cider brand in the United States, with sales of $222.4 million that year and held a 50% share on the US cider market in 2021 (down from 60% in 2016).

== Recall ==
On August 4, 2015, Angry Orchard had a voluntary recall of select cases of its hard cider due to concerns of refermentation in the bottles. This decision was made after consumer inquiries about bottles that were broken or overflowing when opened, as well as several follow-up quality tests.
