= Microsoft campus =

Corporate headquarters of Microsoft

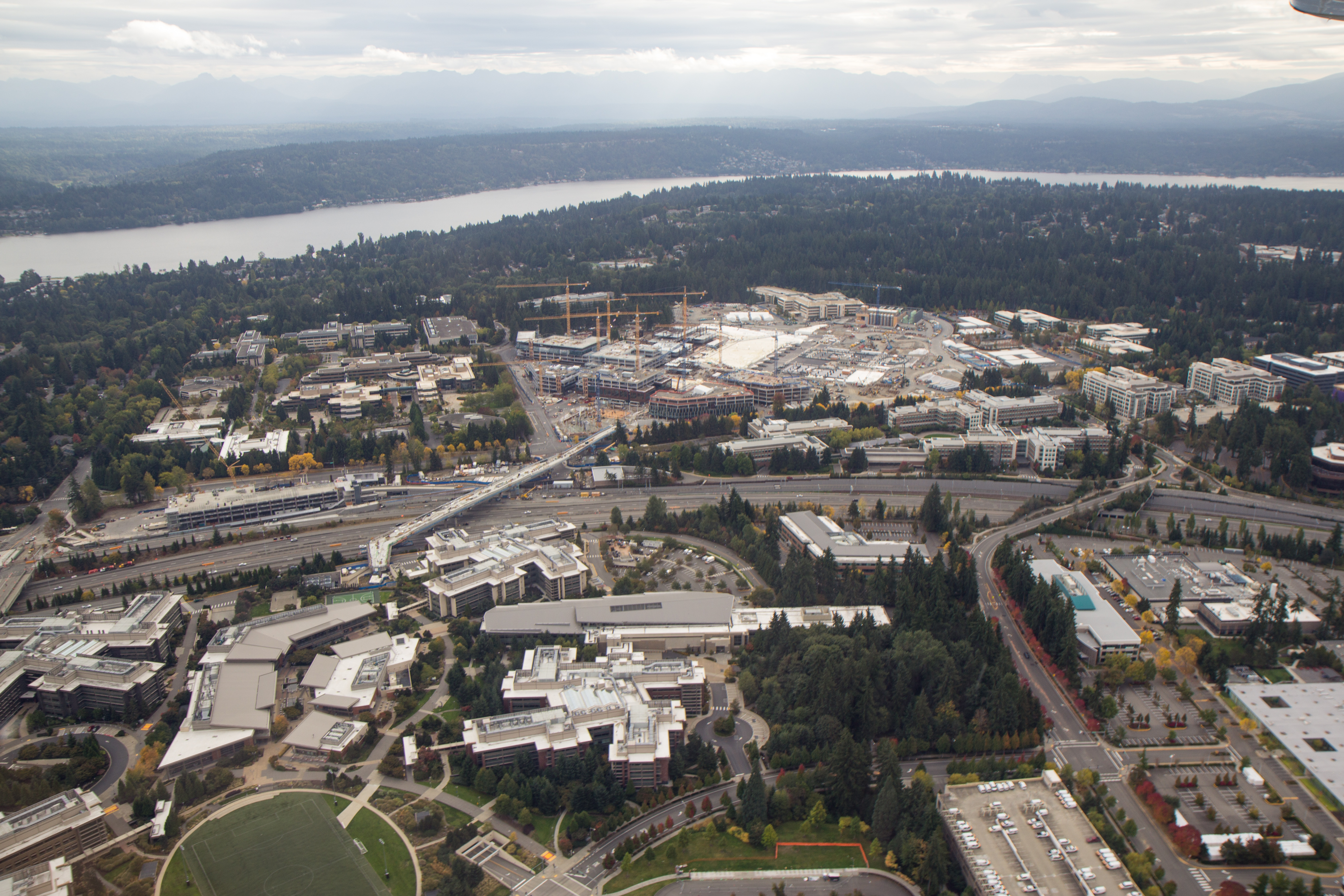
- Aerial view during redevelopment of the East Campus
- Built: 1986
- Location: Redmond, Washington, U.S.
- Coordinates: 47°38′31″N 122°07′38″W
- Industry: Technology
- Employees: 53,576
- Buildings: 83
- Area: 502 acres (203 ha)
- Owner: Microsoft

The Microsoft campus is the corporate headquarters of Microsoft Corporation, located in Redmond, Washington, United States, a part of the Seattle metropolitan area. Microsoft initially moved onto the grounds of the campus on February 26, 1986, shortly before going public on March 13. The headquarters has undergone multiple expansions since its establishment and is presently estimated to encompass over 8 million square feet (740,000 m^{2}) of office space and has over 50,000 employees.

As of November 2018, the campus holds 83 buildings. Additional offices in the Eastside suburbs of Seattle are located in Bellevue and Issaquah. Building 92 on the campus contains a visitor center (with interactive exhibits) and a store that is open to the public.

== History ==
Microsoft chose to move its headquarters from Bellevue to nearby Redmond in January 1985, selecting a 29-acre (12 ha) plot of land that would be developed by Wright Runstad & Company. Construction began on August 9, and Microsoft moved into the $25 million facility on February 26, 1986, several weeks before the company's initial public offering. The move generated some concerns about increased traffic congestion on the unfinished State Route 520 freeway between Bellevue and Redmond; a new freeway interchange at Northeast 40th Street would later be built in 2000 to service the campus, after lobbying and partial funding from Microsoft.

The initial campus was situated on a 30-acre (12 ha) lot with six buildings and was able to accommodate 800 employees, growing to 1,400 by 1988. The site was once home to chicken farms in the 1920s that were ultimately demolished. The campus was originally leased to Microsoft from the Teachers Insurance and Annuity Association, a pension fund manager, until it was bought back in 1992. The original buildings were given sequential numbers, except for 7, due to a delay in permitting that became indefinite. A pond between the original buildings was nicknamed "Lake Bill" for Bill Gates and was used for post-project celebrations, namely, managers being thrown in after a successful launch.

The first major expansion of the campus came in 1992, bringing the total amount of office space to 1.7 million square feet (160,000 m^{2}) across 260 acres (110 ha) of land. Microsoft also announced its intention to contain most of its future growth within Redmond, while retaining some offices in Downtown Bellevue and its Factoria district. Hundreds of rabbits were spread around the Redmond campus in the late 1990s. A moratorium on development was implemented by the city government of Redmond, which prevented further campus expansion. In 2001, Microsoft announced plans for a satellite campus in Issaquah for 12,000 workers, but later reduced its scope. An expansion in Redmond was considered after options in Seattle's South Lake Union neighborhood were rejected.

In January 2006, Microsoft announced the purchase of Safeco's Redmond campus after the company had begun consolidating its offices at the Safeco Tower in Seattle's University District a year earlier. The following month, Microsoft announced that it intended to expand its Redmond campus by 1,100,000 square feet (100,000 m^{2}) for $1 billion and said that this would create space for between 7,000 and 15,000 new employees over the following three years. The campus expansion also included more prominent branding and additional recreation areas.

In 2009, a shopping mall called "The Commons" was completed on the campus, bringing 1.4 million square feet (130,000 m^{2}) of retail space as well as restaurants, a soccer field, and a pub to the West Campus. A set of treehouses was built on the campus in 2017 by American treehouse builder Pete Nelson, as well as an elevated outdoor lounge named the Crow's Nest.

=== East Campus redevelopment ===
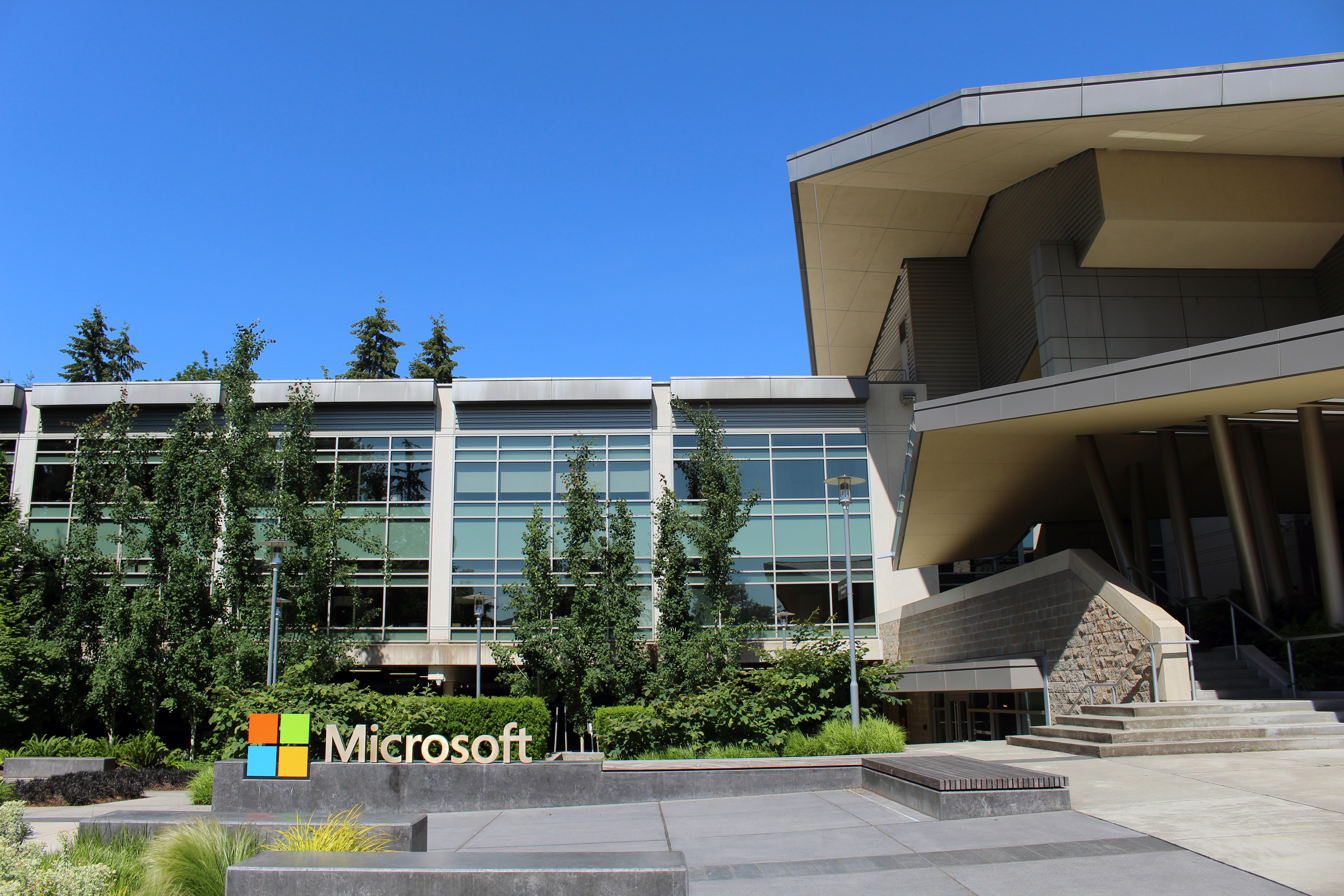
Building 92, home to the Microsoft Visitor Center

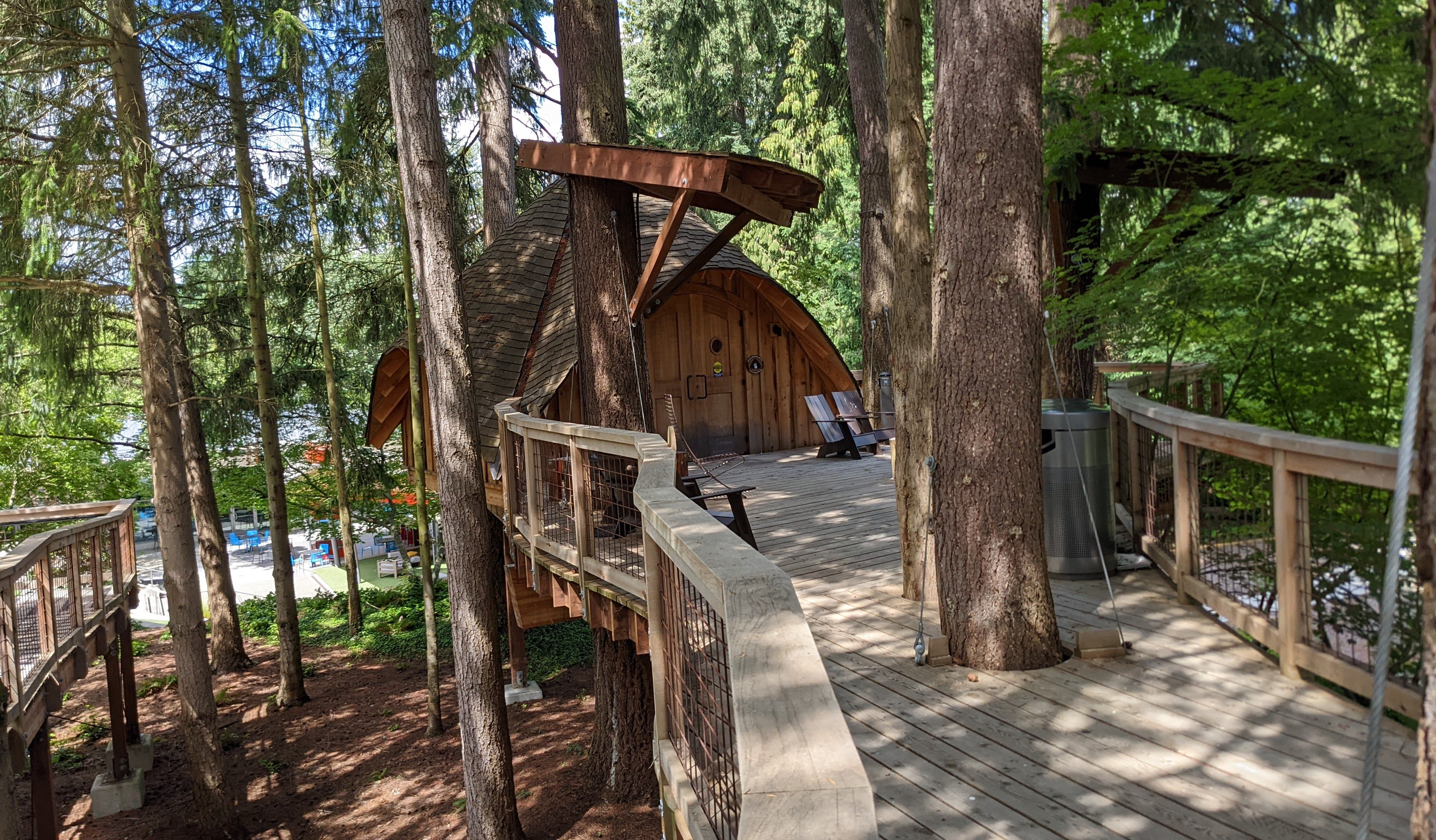
One of the two treehouses built by Pete Nelson, near Building 31

In September 2015, The Seattle Times reported that Microsoft had hired architecture firm Skidmore, Owings & Merrill to begin a multibillion-dollar redesign of the Redmond campus, using an additional 1.4 million square feet (130,000 m^{2}) permitted by an agreement with the City of Redmond. The City of Redmond had also approved a rezone in February that year to raise the height limit for buildings on the campus from six stories to ten.

In November 2017, Microsoft unveiled plans to demolish 12 buildings on the older East Campus and replace them with 18 new buildings, housing 8,000 additional employees and raising the total number of buildings on the campus to 131. The newer buildings would be arranged like an urban neighborhood, centered around a 2-acre (0.81 ha) open space with sports fields (including a cricket pitch), retail space, and hiking trails. Demolition of the original buildings, including all of the original X-shaped offices built in the 1980s, began in January 2019 and was completed that September.

The redevelopment includes plans for 17 buildings and four floors of underground parking with capacity for 6,500 vehicles. As of February 2026, the final five buildings were on hold, and Microsoft said it had no short-term plans to construct them. The garage sits below a pedestrianized environment between the buildings, which are part of five "villages". A 1,100-foot (340 m) pedestrian bridge connects the new campus buildings to the Redmond Technology light rail station and the West Campus area. A set of 875 wells to harness geothermal energy will provide heating and cooling to buildings on the campus through 220 miles (350 km) of water pipes that comprise a geoexchange system.

== Transportation ==
The campus is located on both sides of the State Route 520 freeway, which connects it to the cities of Bellevue and Seattle, as well as downtown Redmond. The two sides of the campus are connected by a series of pedestrian and vehicle overpasses that cross State Route 520. Microsoft partially covered the cost for an overpass over the freeway at NE 36th Street to relieve congestion on other cross-streets in the area. Two more pedestrian bridges were jointly funded by Microsoft, the city government, and Sound Transit to connect the campus's light rail stations.

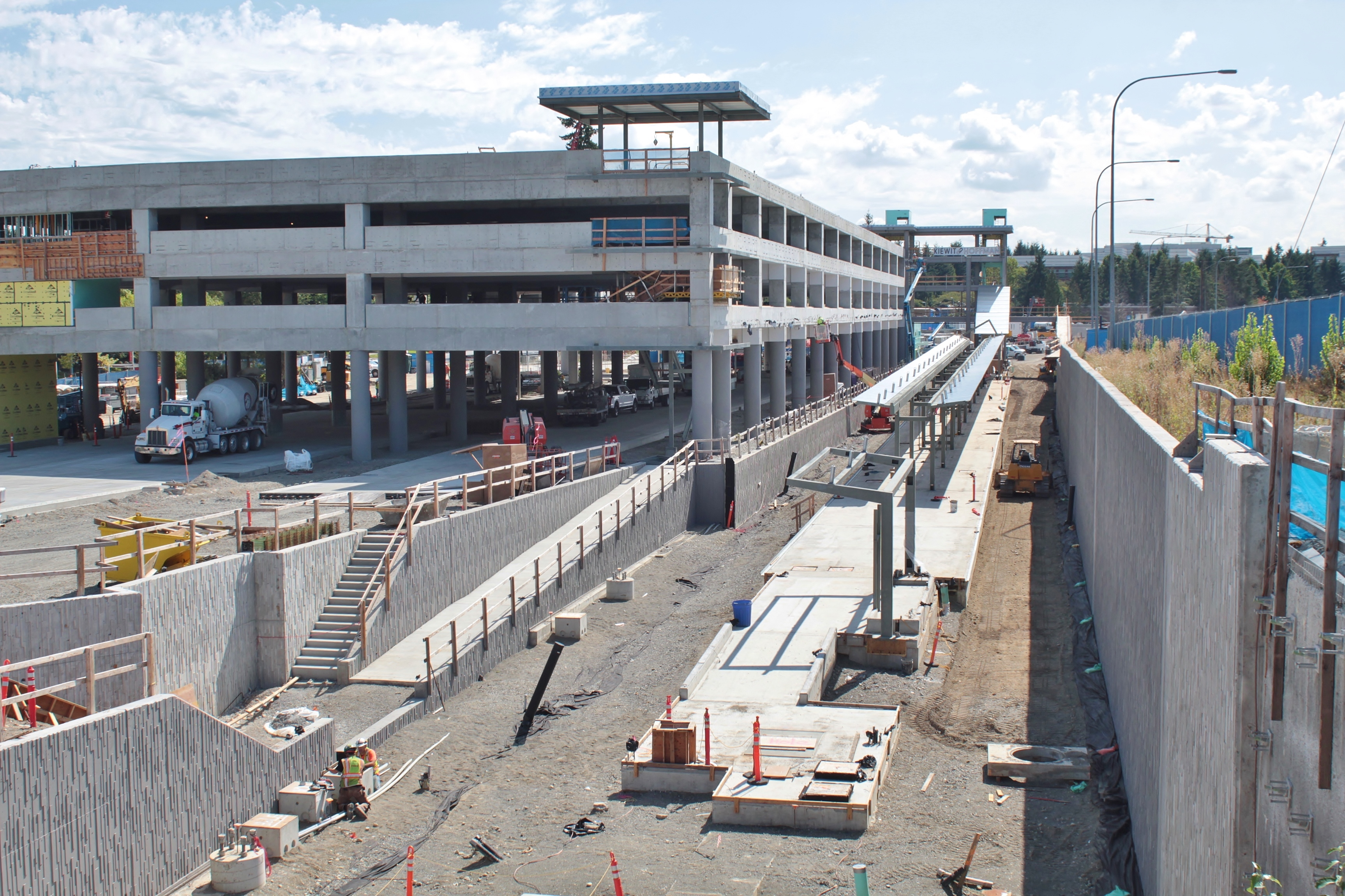
Redmond Technology station, a Link light rail station on the Microsoft campus, was under construction in September 2019.

The campus is served by Seattle-area buses operated by Sound Transit and King County Metro that serve stops on State Route 520 and a central hub at Redmond Technology station. The RapidRide B Line also runs through the campus, connecting to downtown Bellevue and Redmond. The Overlake Transit Center opened in 2002 and was replaced by the new Redmond Technology station, which opened on April 27, 2024, to serve Link light rail trains on the 2 Line.

For employees, Microsoft also operates a private commuter bus service called Connector that provides express service from the Redmond campus to neighborhoods in Seattle, the Eastside, and Snohomish County. The company also runs a shuttle bus service, called the "Shuttle Connect", between buildings on the campus. Microsoft had proposed its own bus service as early as 1998 to augment existing public transit routes that serve the campus. The service launched in September 2007 and grew into a network of 19 routes within two years; the buses have on-board Wi-Fi and are operated by MV Transportation. The shuttles were targeted in early 2014 as a symbol of gentrification in a similar fashion to the San Francisco tech bus protests that same year. The Connector system is allowed to use King County Metro bus stops in Seattle as part of a permit system for corporate shuttles established by the city government in 2017.
