= Rudolf F. Haffenreffer =

American businessman and philanthropist

Rudolf F. Haffenreffer III (c. 1902 – April 28, 1991) was a Rhode Island industrialist whose family businesses included the Narragansett Brewing Company, of which he was president and chairman. He also gained ownership of the Mount Hope Bridge through receivership in 1931. In 1955, he donated 376 acres (1.52 km^{2}) of wooded shorefront property in Bristol, Rhode Island to Brown University to create what became the Haffenreffer Museum of Anthropology.

== See also ==
- Haffenreffer Brewery
- Private Stock (malt liquor)

== Weblinks ==
- Nora Sobich. "Der Häuptling und der Bierbrauer". Deutschlandfunk-Kultur-Sendung „Zeitfragen Geschichte“ (in German).
