= Private Stock (malt liquor) =

Haffenreffer Private Stock (commonly referred to as P-Stock, The Green Death, Head Wrecker, Heffy's, Haffen-Wrecker or The Golden Cap) is a brand of malt liquor first brewed in 1953 at the Haffenreffer Brewery in Jamaica Plain, Boston. In 1965, production of the brand moved to Narragansett Brewing Company in Rhode Island and then to the Falstaff Brewing Company. It was brewed in Latrobe, Pennsylvania and Utica, New York under license from Haffenreffer & Co.

Known for its tagline "The malt liquor with the imported taste", it contained 5.9% alcohol by volume, and commonly was found in 16 oz cans and 40 oz bottles, it is also available in six packs.

Over the years, Private Stock was associated with both celebrities and athletes. Wilt Chamberlain promoted Private Stock with the tagline "Nobody does it bigger."

One notable aspect of Private Stock packaging is that the undersides of Private Stock bottle caps contained words or Rebus puzzles.

Private Stock was discontinued in 2013.

== Cultural references ==
The song Juicy by the rapper Notorious B.I.G. mentions Private Stock in the lyrics. The song Old School by the rapper Tupac mentions Private Stock in the lyric, "You diggy don't stop, sippin on that Private Stock".
