= Jim Koch =

American businessman and founder of Boston beer company

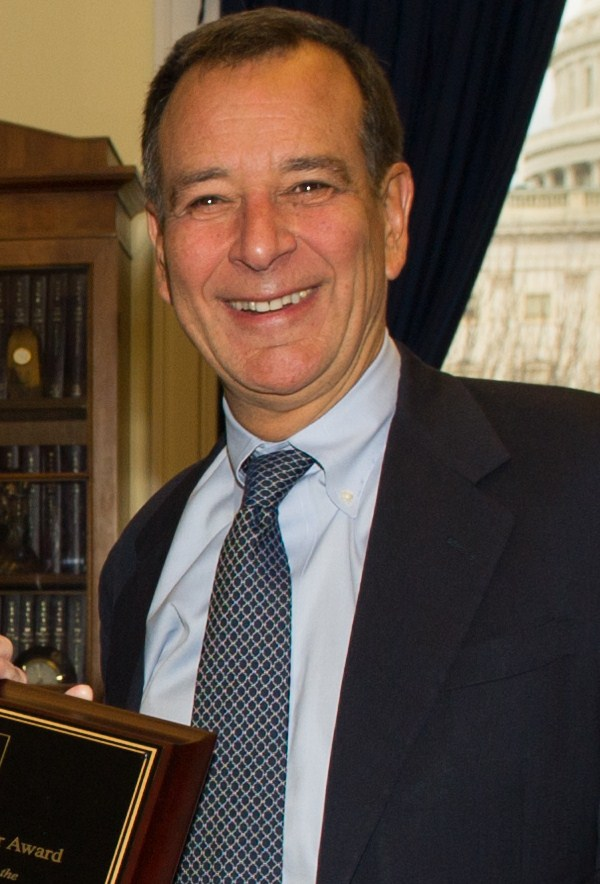
- Koch in 2013
- Born: Charles James Koch; May 27, 1949 (age 76); Cincinnati, Ohio, U.S.
- Education: Harvard University (BA, MBA, JD)
- Occupation: Businessman
- Known for: Co-founder and chairman of the Boston Beer Company
- Spouses: Susan (divorced) Cynthia Fisher (m. 1994)
- Children: 4

Charles James Koch (/kʊk/ KUUK; born May 27, 1949) is an American businessman who is the co-founder and chairman of the Boston Beer Company, the producers of Samuel Adams beer. Koch is widely considered to be a founding father of the American craft brewing movement.

== Early life ==
Koch was born in Cincinnati, Ohio, to German-American parents Charles and Dorothy (née Kautz) Koch. Charles was a fifth-generation brewer. Koch earned Bachelor of Arts, Master of Business Administration, and Juris Doctor degrees from Harvard University.

== Career ==
Koch is a former consultant with the Boston Consulting Group. He was formerly an Outward Bound instructor. In 1984, Koch co-founded the Boston Beer Company, the producers of Samuel Adams beer.

Koch took Boston Beer company public in 1995 and owns a 19.5% stake in the company, giving him a net worth of over $1 billion. In 2023 he was ranked #1905 in Forbes Billionaires 2023.

In 2016, Koch published Quench Your Own Thirst: Business Lessons Learned Over a Beer or Two, in which he discussed how he left his career as a management consultant to start his own brewery using his great-great-grandfather's recipe.

At an August 2018 dinner with U.S. President Donald Trump, Koch said the corporate tax cut of 2017 played a major role in making the Boston Beer Company more competitive in regard to foreign competitors: "When I started Sam Adams, American beer was a joke, and it pissed me off. And now, American brewers make the best beer in the world. And the tax reform was a very big deal for all of us, because 85 percent of the beer made in the United States is owned by foreign companies." Koch faced criticism after he made the comments.

== Personal life ==
Koch's marriage to his first wife, Susan, ended around the time he started the Boston Beer Company. He remarried to entrepreneur Cynthia Fisher in 1994. He has two children from his first marriage and two from his second. They live in Newton, Massachusetts.

Koch is unrelated to Stone Brewing Co. cofounder Greg Koch.
