= Treehouse Masters =

- Title card (season 8)
- Genre: Reality
- Country of origin: United States
- Original language: English
- No. of seasons: 11
- No. of episodes: 100

Production
- Executive producer: Bradford Holt
- Running time: 43 minutes
- Production company: Stiletto TV (2013–2015) Wilma TV, Inc (2015–2018)

Original release
- Network: Animal Planet
- Release: May 31, 2013 – September 29, 2018

Treehouse Masters is an American reality television series that aired on Animal Planet and starred Pete Nelson, a master treehouse builder and owner of Nelson Treehouse and Supply. Each episode, Nelson and his team design and build custom treehouses for clients across the country. The show debuted on May 31, 2013 and ended on September 29, 2018.

== Cast ==
- Pete Nelson – Master treehouse designer, builder, and self-proclaimed "tree whisperer" who loves nature and spending time in the woods. He believes trees have personalities and that treehouses are "the ultimate return to nature."
- Daryl McDonald – Lead Foreman at Nelson Treehouse and Supply
- Charlie Nelson – Pete's son and Nelson Treehouse and Supply Carpenter
- Henry Nelson – Pete's son and Nelson Treehouse and Supply Builder
- Alex Meyer – Carpenter and Project Manager; has a background in rock climbing
- Chuck McLellan – Craftsman at Nelson Treehouse and Supply
- Seanix Zenobia – Carpenter at Nelson Treehouse and Supply
- Tory Jones – Art Director and on-camera interior designer Seasons 1 – 8
- Christina Salway – Art Director and on-camera interior designer Seasons 9 – 11

== In popular culture ==
Treehouse Masters was mentioned as a favorite show of lead character Jimmy Shive-Overly on FXX's You're The Worst.

Daniel Tosh spoofed the show in the 2016 Tosh.0 episode "Tree Fall Kid."

== Series overview ==
Season	Episodes	First Aired	Last Aired
1	10	May 31, 2013	August 2, 2013
2	8	December 23, 2013	February 21, 2014
3	12	May 30, 2014	September 19, 2014
4	11	December 26, 2014	April 17, 2015
5	10	July 10, 2015	September 18, 2015
6	9	December 18, 2015	March 11, 2016
7	8	July 8, 2016	September 16, 2016
8	6	December 23, 2016	February 3, 2017
9	9	August 4, 2017	September 22, 2017
10	9	January 5, 2018	March 3, 2018
11	8	August 17, 2018	September 29, 2018

== Episodes ==
=== Season 1 (2013) ===
No. overall	No. in season	Title	Original release date
1	1	"Backyard Bungalow"	May 31, 2013
With their daughter ready to return from college, an Oregon family calls on Pete to expand their home to include a treehouse guesthouse.
2	2	"Canopy Clubhouse"	June 7, 2013
Money is no object for a Bedford, NY family who hires Pete to design a clubhouse with a BBQ patio and lofted playroom.
3	3	"Spirit House Retreat"	June 14, 2013
A writer hires Pete to build a gold-leafed retreat in her New York cedar tree.
4	4	"Sky High Spa"	June 21, 2013
A ranch retreat hires Pete to build an elaborate spa treehouse in Austin, Texas.
5	5	"Twenty-Ton Texas Treehouse"	June 28, 2013
Pete is asked to build the biggest treehouse he has ever taken on – a ranch style treehouse in Waco, Texas.
6	6	"Love is in the Air"	July 5, 2013
A couple unable to book a room at Treehouse Point for their wedding inspires Pete to build a Honeymoon Suite.
7	7	"Tree Taphouse"	July 12, 2013
Pete builds a brewery in the trees with the help of some Amish locals in Ohio.
8	8	"Luck o' the Irish Cottage"	July 19, 2013
Nelson Treehouse and Supply builds a Celtic-themed cottage for an Irish family featuring a circular design and a fireplace.
9	9	"View from Above"	July 26, 2013
Pete builds a children's treehouse for a family with four kids – two with special needs. During the build he takes a look back on previous episodes with his carpentry team.
10	10	"Ultimate Treehouses"	August 2, 2013
Pete travels the globe looking for the biggest, baddest, craziest treehouses.

=== Season 2 (2013–2014) ===
No. overall	No. in season	Title	Original release date
11	1	"Santa's Workshop"	December 23, 2013
Pete and the crew build an Alpine-style treehouse for a Christmas-obsessed family.
12	2	"Temple of Adventure"	January 10, 2014
Pete builds a treehouse for an adventurous Pennsylvania family complete with a rock climbing wall and suspension bridges.
13	3	"Black Bear Bungalow"	January 17, 2014
Two sisters recruit Pete to build an observation treehouse so they can watch the local black bears explore their large property.
14	4	"Wild Butterfly Escape"	January 24, 2014
Pete builds a therapeutic treehouse with a butterfly theme for a hope center in Ohio.
15	5	"Sky High Redwood Retreat"	January 31, 2014
Pete and his crew accept a challenge to build a permanent residence 60 feet up in a handful of giant redwood trees.
16	6	"Levitating Lighthouse"	February 7, 2014
Materials arrive by barge to a steeply graded property along the Washington coast for a nautical lighthouse treehouse.
17	7	"Ultimate Treehouses II: The Roots"	February 14, 2014
A look at the history and evolution of treehouses including a Papua, New Guinea, tribal treehouse built by hand, a 200 year-old backyard treehouse, a New York luxury treehouse and a Costa Rican re-purposed airplane fuselage.
18	8	"Record High Recording Studio"	February 21, 2014
A Seattle family asks for a recording studio in cedar trees at Bear Creek Studio. When it's done, Pete gets a visit from CeeLo Green, a Grammy-winning singer ready to break it in.

=== Season 3 (2014) ===
No. overall	No. in season	Title	Original release date
19	1	"Mile High Mancave"	May 30, 2014
Pete builds a manly treetop getaway for a Texas dad with three daughters.
20	2	"African Safari Hut"	June 6, 2014
A Kenyan author calls in Pete and company to build an African-inspired circular treehouse in his property’s Douglas fir trees.
21	3	"Bionic Treehouse"	June 13, 2014
Pete stops by at his former home to rehabilitate his old treehouses for their current owners.
22	4	"Scottish Sky Garden"	June 20, 2014
A Tulsa couple hires Pete to create a treehouse that combines their two interests: gardening and their Scottish heritage.
23	5	"Birds Nest"	June 27, 2014
An Arkansas grandmother reaches out to Pete to build a treehouse designed with tree branches to look like a bird’s nest. Roderick Romero assists with the nest construction.
24	6	"Towering Treetop Teahouse"	July 11, 2014
Nelson Treehouse and Supply is inspired by Buddha’s teachings to complete a traditional Japanese Teahouse in Seattle.
25	7	"Treehouse Masters International: Japan"	July 18, 2014
Pete joins Japan's most beloved treehouse builder, Takashi Kobayashi, for a tour of the country's coolest treehouses.
26	8	"Vincent Van Treehouse"	July 25, 2014
Three siblings call on Pete to build a Scandinavian-style Art Studio treehouse as a surprise for their parents.
27	9	"Canopy Island Camp"	August 1, 2014
A Washington family brings in Pete to build the Native American-inspired summer camp treehouse of their dreams.
28	10	"View from Above II"	August 8, 2014
Pete and Daryl team up with an inventive designer to create a 30-sided geodesic globe suspended by wires.
29	11	"Country Superstar Speakeasy"	August 15, 2014
Brian Kelley, of Florida Georgia Line, brings in Pete to build a speakeasy treehouse for him and his new wife.
30	12	"AJ's Wish Treehouse"	September 19, 2014
Pete teams up with a local fire department and Make-A-Wish to give an 8-year-old a treehouse inspired by the movie The Boxtrolls.

=== Season 4 (2014–2015) ===
No. overall	No. in season	Title	Original release date
31	1	"Treetop Candy Kitchen"	December 26, 2014
Pete and the crew build an 80,000 lb stainless steel kitchen as a Christmas gift for a family of candy makers.
32	2	"The Coolest Treehouse Ever Built"	January 9, 2015
Pete makes a treehouse with a full wall of windows for a pair of Maine tastemakers.
33	3	"Meditating Maple"	January 16, 2015
Pete and company channel their chakras to build a Seattle meditation space 20 feet up in the air.
34	4	"Treehive Beehive"	January 23, 2015
Pete and the guys build a beehive-inspired structure up in a Douglas fir.
35	5	"Treehouse Masters International: Germany"	January 30, 2015
Pete joins two renowned local treehouse builders, Christopher Richter and Andreas Wenning, for a tour of Germany’s finest treehouses.
36	6	"Kentucky Climber's Cottage"	February 6, 2015
Pete builds a treehouse for a tree-climbing school run by a couple that loves trees almost as much as he does.
37	7	"Lost in the Forest"	February 13, 2015
A behind the scenes look at footage left on the cutting room floor.
38	8	"Sky High Pirate Hideout"	February 20, 2015
A couple brings in Pete to build a pirate-inspired treehouse with a rope bridge and hidden compartments.
39	9	"Ultimate Treehouses III: American Masters"	February 27, 2015
Pete travels across the US visiting treehouses with fellow builders David Geisen, Attie Jonker, and Roderick Romero.
40	10	"Triple Decker Record Setter"	March 6, 2015
Pete builds his biggest treehouse yet, a three level village in Louisiana.
41	11	"Ultimate Giveaway Treehouse"	April 17, 2015
Pete and his crew build a treehouse for the winner of the Ultimate Treehouse Giveaway.

=== Season 5 (2015) ===
No. overall	No. in season	Title	Original release date
42	1	"Nelson Family Treehouse"	July 10, 2015
Nelson Treehouse and Supply builds a treehouse for Pete’s daughter, Emily, and her boyfriend, Patrick, who is carpenter for Nelson Treehouse & Supply.
43	2	"High Noon Saloon"	July 17, 2015
NTS builds a Tolkien-inspired fantasy treehouse for a family along the waters of Lake Chelan.
44	3	"Mindbending Silver Maple"	July 24, 2015
A wild west treehouse is this week’s assignment and the client is NTS electrician, Walker.
45	4	"Treehouse Masters International: Brazil"	July 31, 2015
Pete pays a visit to South American treehouse master Ricardo Brunelli for a look at Brazil’s best treehouses.
46	5	"Twin Fix"	August 7, 2015
Pete returns to two treehouses he built, one for his good friend John in 1998 another for Lolly, an aspiring painter, in 2002.
47	6	"Ultimate Treehouses IV: Engineering and Ingenuity"	August 14, 2015
Pete explores treehouses with impressive engineering feats and does some engineering repair on one of his own treehouses.
48	7	"Sunrise Day Camp Clubhouse"	August 21, 2015
A New York summer camp for kids battling cancer brings in Pete to construct a new treehouse for the campers and their siblings.
49	8	"Magical Party Pad"	August 28, 2015
Pete builds a treetop castle complete with a turret for sisters with property in the lush woods of Nebraska.
50	9	"Workshop Edition"	September 11, 2015
Pete and company build a treehouse for a group of young carpenters at Sawhorse Revolution.
51	10	"Home Tree Home"	September 18, 2015
A graduate of Pete’s Treehouse Workshop calls him in to build an oceanside treehouse in Oregon.

=== Season 6 (2015–2016) ===
No. overall	No. in season	Title	Original release date
52	1	"Merry Fishmas!"	December 18, 2015
Pete and his crew journey to Dogwood Canyon in Lampe, Missouri to build a treehouse for Bass Pro Shop’s John Morris.
53	2	"Texas-Sized Treehouse"	January 15, 2016
A Texas couple brings in NTS to build a giant treehouse to use as a cozy hangout with their family.
54	3	"Rustic English Re-tree-t"	January 22, 2016
On a farm where goats are born and raised, a North Carolina couple brings in Pete to build a cottage in the trees.
55	4	"Treehouse "Z""	January 29, 2016
Pete’s friends call Nelson Treehouse and Supply to build a meditative treehouse in the Blue Ridge Mountains.
56	5	"View From Above III"	February 5, 2016
Pete hosts some of his crew for a campfire look at back at some of their favorite treehouses they’ve built.
57	6	"Apres Skihouse Treehouse"	February 19, 2016
A ski-loving family recruits Pete to create a cozy winter Ski Chalet treehouse.
58	7	"Treehouse Takeover: The Roderick Experience"	February 26, 2016
Roderick Romero makes a special appearance to build a treehouse out of salvaged materials.
59	8	"Camo Treehouse"	March 4, 2016
A competitive family in Texas hires Pete to build a treehouse to be used as a prize for an upcoming survival game.
60	9	"Magical Modern Treehouse"	March 11, 2016
Pete takes a call from a breast cancer survivor to build a healing treehouse in Georgia.

=== Season 7 (2016) ===
No. overall	No. in season	Title	Original release date
61	1	"Bone-Appe-Treehouse"	July 8, 2016
The Laurel Tree French restaurant in Texas brings in Pete to build a dining room in the trees.
62	2	"Adventure Headquarters"	July 15, 2016
Adventurous friends Mike and Monica bring in Pete to build a treehouse headquarters.
63	3	"How 'Bout Them Apples"	July 22, 2016
The Angry Orchard Cider Company calls on Pete to build a treehouse tasting room.
64	4	"Frank Lloyd Lakehouse"	July 29, 2016
Frank Lloyd Wright is the inspiration for a three-story treehouse in Kentucky.
65	5	"Treehouse Point 2.0"	August 26, 2016
Pete is ready to expand his treehouse empire in the form of a new resort and spa in the trees.
66	6	"Swiss Family Surprise"	September 2, 2016
A 40th wedding anniversary is the occasion that brings Pete and his crew to Marion, Michigan.
67	7	"Ultimate Treehouses V"	September 9, 2016
Pete explores treehouses around the world that are used to enrich the mind, body and spirit.
68	8	"Zac Brown's Space Crab"	September 16, 2016
Country star Zac Brown joins Pete to build a treehouse at an arts camp for kids.

=== Season 8 (2016–2017) ===
No. overall	No. in season	Title	Original release date
69	1	"Appalachian Christmas Treehouse"	December 23, 2016
Pete and the guys build a treehouse for NTS carpenter Mike Reynolds in North Carolina.
70	2	"Treehouse Masters International: Scandinavia"	January 6, 2017
Pete stops by the TreeTop Hotel in Norway before checking out a handful of Swedish treehouses.
71	3	"Nature's Super HQ"	January 13, 2017
Amy and Nicole of the For-Mar Nature Preserve and Arboretum call on Pete to create a treehouse classroom.
72	4	"Glasshouse Treehouse"	January 20, 2017
Two workaholics in New York enlist Pete to build a treehouse getaway in glass.
73	5	"The Owl Treehouse"	January 27, 2017
A Montessori school asks Pete to build an owl-themed treehouse library.
74	6	"Treehouse Masters: Surprise Makeover Edition"	February 3, 2017
Contest winners are surprised with $20,000 treehouse renovations.

=== Season 9 (2017) ===
No. overall	No. in season	Title	Original release date
75	1	"A Treehouse Fit for a Viking"	August 4, 2017
Pete takes on his first international tree house in Norway; working alongside a local builder named Frode, the one-of-a-kind, 24-foot-high retreat accommodates eight and allows for stunning views of the nearby lake.
76	2	"Hill Country Hideout"	August 4, 2017
Pete and his gang ride out to the Lone Star State to build a double-decker hideout in Texas Hill Country; Pete creates rustic perfection in six live oak trees with a saloon-style first floor for sippin' sarsaparilla and a glass floor for views below.
77	3	"Glamorous Glamping Retreat"	August 11, 2017
The NTS team leave their tents behind and head to New Jersey to build a campers retreat for an outdoor-loving couple with a screened-in porch, floating barbecue deck and cozy hanging bed, this Adirondack style tree-cabin puts glamping in the trees.
78	4	"Thrill 'n' Chill Treehouse"	August 18, 2017
Pete descends upon western Washington to make a tree house for action and relaxation; with a 55-foot-long bouncy-bridge entryway into a 20-foot-high structure and a zip line that travels through the forest, this tree house generates non-stop thrills.
79	5	"Jeffersonian Honeymoon Suite"	August 25, 2017
Pete and his team descend upon Virginia for the first time to bring the tree house revolution to Bella Rose Plantation; drawing on the architectural innovations of Thomas Jefferson, Pete designs a luxurious two-story tree house with colonial columns.
80	6	"The Bird Barn Treehouse"	September 1, 2017
Two retirees get a retreat on their 100-acre Wisconsin farm; Pete builds a barnlike birdhouse with three separate pods – an art studio, an office and a lounge – complete with a screened-in porch and a deck overlooking their stable of alpacas.
81	7	"City Sleeker Treehouse"	September 8, 2017
Pete is back in Texas to build a sophisticated, sleek-and-chic treehouse in the heart of Dallas; Daryl and the NTS team put treehouse engineering to the ultimate test at Washington State University, proving down-to-the-pound the power of the TAB.
82	8	"Grace VanderWaal's Got Treehouse"	September 15, 2017
When asked in 2016 what she would do with her winnings, America's Got Talent Season 11 winner Grace Vanderwaal said she wanted a tree house built by Pete Nelson; the 13-year-old singer-songwriter's wish comes true.
83	9	"Alaskan Mountain Treehouse"	September 22, 2017
It's the finale in Denali. Pete travels to Alaska to build a mountaineering lodge in the shadow of North America's highest peak, constructing an A-framed masterpiece for the Mt. McKinley Princess Wilderness Lodge with breathtaking views of Denali.

=== Season 10 (2018) ===
No. overall	No. in season	Title	Original release date
84	1	"Double Treehouse Extravaganza"	January 5, 2018
A couple wants a treehouse inspired by a children's book with a grown-up twist, and at the same time, Pete and the team build a whimsical Tudor-style theatre treehouse.
85	2	"Off-the-Grid Getaway"	January 12, 2018
Pete creates an off-the-grid escape that's all about peace, love, and treehouses, man; building a stunning treehouse made from re-purposed materials, while the client, Sarah Jay, adds her own touch – a massive dream net hammock in the trees.
86	3	"Rusty Rooted River Shack"	January 19, 2018
Pete and the team travel to Trempealeau, Wis., to build a rustic river shack-themed tree house for two parents who yearn for an easy escape after a long day.
87	4	"The Alaskan Treetop Sauna"	January 26, 2018
Pete creates an arboreal abode for an adventurous Alaskan couple that offers all the warm fuzzies they get from the outdoors without having to brave the bitter mountain cold, and heats things up by installing a sauna in the trees!
88	5	"Treehouse Utopia"	February 2, 2018
Pete partners up in Utopia, Texas, for his first joint venture: a tree house bed-and-breakfast built for romance; a French-inspired chapel of love has a 25-foot steeple and the biggest bathroom Pete has built to date.
89	6	"Treetop Medieval Fortress"	February 17, 2018
Come one, come all, come hither to observe a grand treehouse of medieval proportions! It was a treat to build this playful, castle-themed treehouse in Texas for Ronnie, Ty, and their three teenage children. Ty and Ronnie are leaders in their community: Ty is a pastor and Ronnie is running for US Congress. The couple are also avid fans of Game of Thrones and longed to build their own treetop "war room" where they could dream up plans and gather with friends.
90	7	"Mountainside Bulldog Bungalow"	February 24, 2018
Building a pooch-friendly backyard treehouse for Ed, Gail, and their bulldogs was so much fun. Ed and Gail's home sits atop a towering hill, which offers sweeping views of the valley below. With its roomy deck, dual French doors, and large windows, this treehouse is the perfect place to soak in the vast vistas.
91	8	"Shaq's Treetop Speakeasy"	March 3, 2018
Shaquille O'Neal asked for a treetop man-cave where he could gather with friends for card games and libations. Throw in a pinch of moody Prohibition-era decor, a soaring ceiling, and the coolest custom details (like a nine-foot-tall door, extra-long stair treads, and a regal portrait), and you've got a treehouse fit for this Superman.
92	9	"Visiting France"	March 3, 2018
Tours of unique French treehouses.

=== Season 11 (2018) ===
No. overall	No. in season	Title	Original release date
93	1	"Hawaiian Island Treehouse Adventure"	August 11, 2018
Pete journeys to Kauai to build a sky-wave tree house for a couple who ditched the mainland for a laid-back lifestyle; he transforms a bohemian tree house for two former professional surfers into a masterpiece with a crows nest 60 feet above ground.
94	2	"Hot Tub Rumpus Room"	August 25, 2018
Pete's fun-loving friend, and forklift supplier, is the lucky recipient of a treehouse built strictly for good times. The team builds a dream of a treehouse complete with a wine bar, a loft, and their first-ever hot tub in the woods of Western Washington.
95	3	"Never Too Old for a Treehouse"	August 25, 2018
Dreams are coming to life in Oregon as Pete builds for an exceptional client named Marlene, who at 81-years-young is finally getting one of her greatest wishes fulfilled: a treehouse. Marlene's giddy with excitement for this new adventure.
96	4	"Antonio Brown's Steel City Skybox"	September 8, 2018
Pete makes a treehouse touchdown in Pittsburgh for Antonio Brown, wide receiver for the Steelers. The game plan: to build a luxury skybox with a 2-story window wall that overlooks a basketball court and football field.
97	5	"Super Spy Treehouse"	September 8, 2018
Pete heads to Alabama's Appalachia to build a super spy treehouse! There, he pulls out all the stops to make the client's espionage-themed dreams come true. We're talking gadgets, hidden passageways, secret rooms and more.
98	6	"View from Above IV"	September 22, 2018
Taking a look back at builds from the past is always a joy for Pete and the carpenters of NT&S. Pete and a few crew members gather around to poke fun at one another about the shenanigans they shared when building high up in the trees.
99	7	"Lifted Lodge Treehouse"	September 22, 2018
The NTS crew travels to an alpaca farm to build a lodge in the trees inspired by our National Parks. They create a structure to take in the mountain views with a 50-foot-long cable bridge entrance and a deck devoted entirely to hammock lounging.
100	8	"Semper Fi in the Sky"	September 29, 2018
Pete answers the call of duty to build a treehouse in Pennsylvania that focuses on the children of Marines. Cargo netting off the deck provides an exciting entry, while even more nets inside form a bridge to access a private loft space.
