= Haffenreffer Museum of Anthropology =

Teaching museum in Rhode Island, US

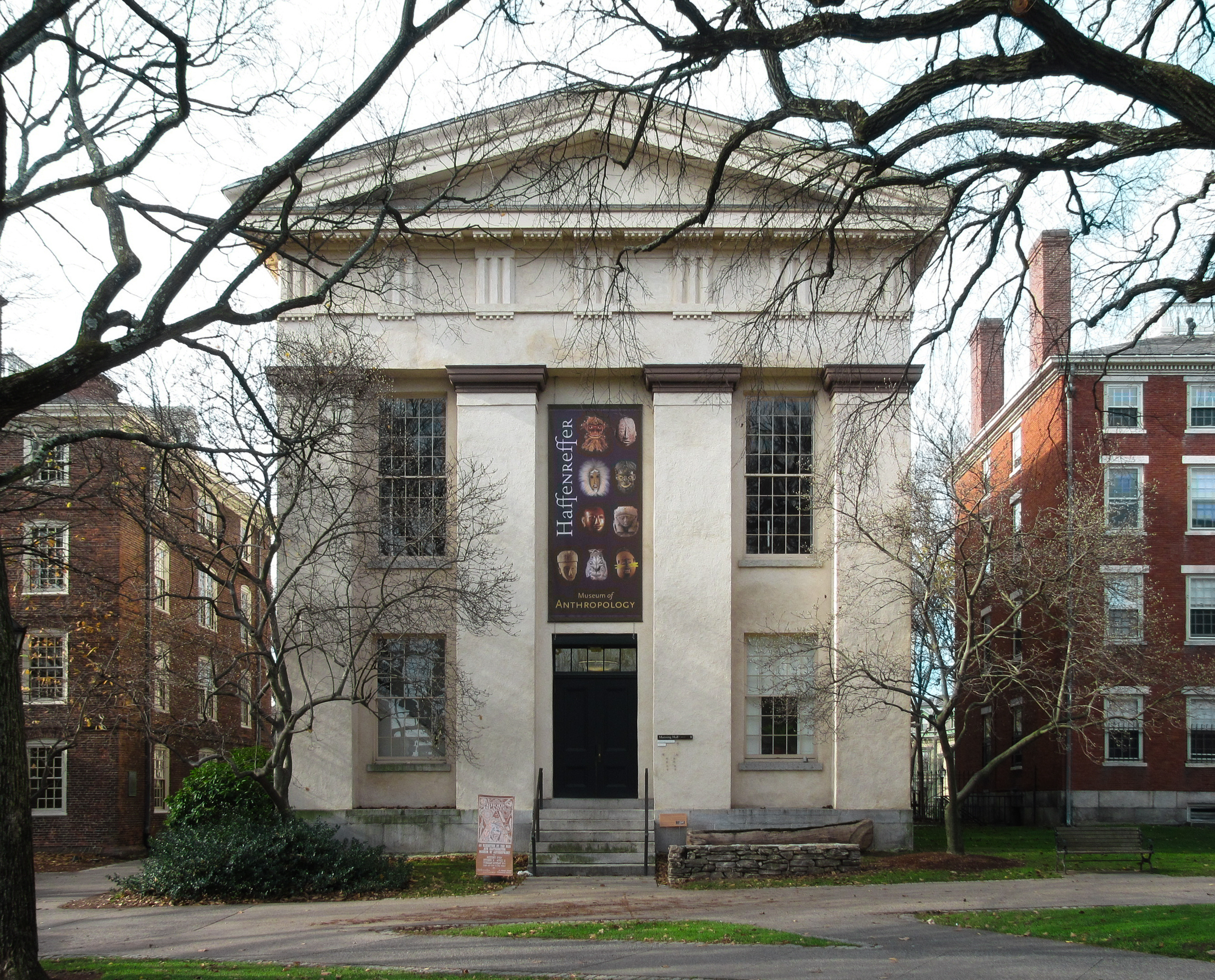
- Haffenreffer Museum of Anthropology, housed in Manning Hall.
- Established: 1955
- Location: Providence, RI; Bristol, RI
- Type: Teaching museum
- Owner: Brown University
- Website: hma.brown.edu

The Haffenreffer Museum of Anthropology is Brown University's teaching and research museum. The museum has a 2,000-square-foot (190 m^{2}) gallery in Manning Hall on Brown's campus in Providence, Rhode Island. Its Collections Research Center is located in nearby Bristol, Rhode Island.

== Background ==
=== History ===
The Haffenreffer Museum's origins lie in the private collection of industrialist Rudolf F. Haffenreffer. In 1917, Haffenreffer acquired the Mount Hope Grant, a Bristol estate that encompassed the home of Wampanoag sachem Metacomet. Haffenreffer discovered a number of artifacts on the property and acquired others during trips through the Western United States. In 1928, he constructed the Haffenreffer Museum of the American Indian to house his collection. Following his death in 1954, Haffenreffer's family donated his collection and estate to Brown University. Under the tenure of founding director J. Louis Giddings, the museum's scope expanded to include artifacts from the Arctic, Africa, and the Pacific.

In 1995 Brown, under the leadership of President Vartan Gregorian, purchased the Old Stone Bank and Benoni Cooke House as part of a plan to relocate the museum's collection and galleries to Downtown Providence. Brown sold the bank building in 2009, abandoning the plan.

In 2006, the Haffenreffer Museum opened a gallery in Manning Hall on Brown's central campus. In 2019, the museum again announced a plan to relocate its collection from Bristol to a consolidated site in Providence, adjacent to the Brown campus. The inventory and planned relocation of the museum's collections is supported by a grant from the Andrew W. Mellon Foundation.

=== Mission ===
The Haffenreffer Museum of Anthropology is Brown University’s teaching museum. A resource across the university, it aims to inspire creative and critical thinking about culture by fostering an interdisciplinary understanding of the material world. It provides opportunities for faculty and students to work with collections and the public, teaching through objects and programs in classrooms, in the CultureLab and exhibitions in Manning Hall, and at the Collections Research Center.

=== Exhibitions ===
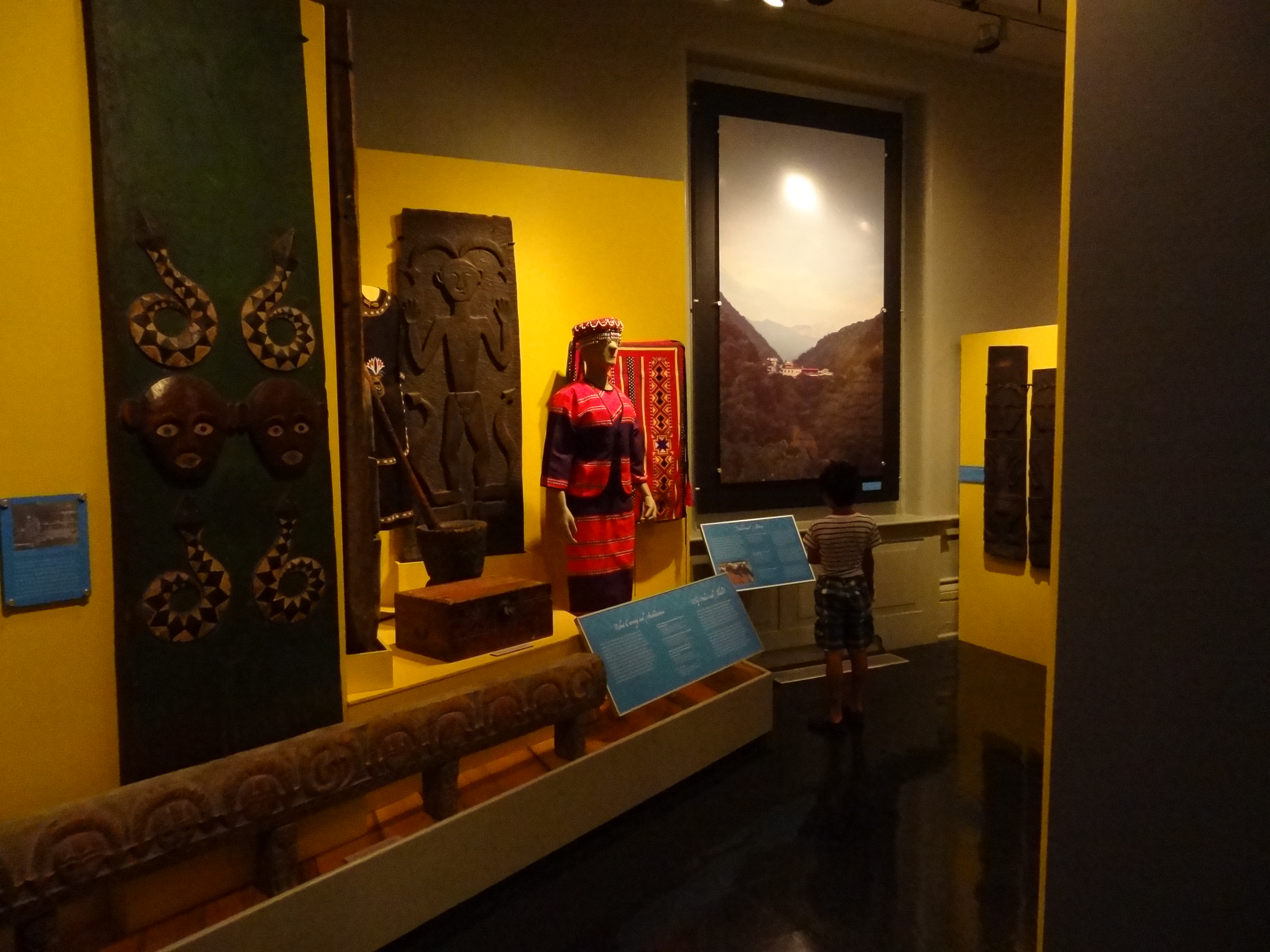
The exhibit Crafting Origins: Creativity and Continuity in Indigenous Taiwan

Changing exhibitions in the museum’s gallery in Manning Hall, at the center of Brown University's campus, highlight the museum's collections from around the world and the work of Brown University faculty, staff and students. The museum also offers public lectures, performances, symposia, festivals, school activities, and a broad range of programs and events for all ages.

=== Educational programs ===
In addition to extensive educational programs for Brown students, centered in the CultureLab in the Manning Gallery, the Museum provides structured group programs delivered to local schools and an extensive array of public lectures.

== Collections ==
=== Artifacts ===
The Museum's holdings total approximately one million items. While strongest in Native North American materials, the museum also contains significant material from Latin America, Africa, the Middle East, and Asia, including:

- 900,000 archeological artifacts excavated by Arctic researchers from National Park Service and Bureau of Land Management lands in Alaska (a federal repository)
- 70,000 archeological and 6,000 ethnological objects from elsewhere in North America
- 2,500 archeological and 3,000 ethnological items from South and Central America
- 40 archeological and 3,000 ethnological items from Africa, some by contemporary artisans
- 400 archeological and 400 ethnological items from Europe
- 1,100 ethnological items from Asia
- 1,500 ethnological items from Oceania

=== Images ===
The Haffenreffer Museum Research Collections Center's photographic archive, in addition to collection record shots, contains photographs from the founder's archives, the Spinden collection of images of Central and South America, and field photographs that accompanied collections. The Center library has some 10,000 volumes. Highlights of the collection include:

- Herbert Spinden Photographic Archive, with over 20,000 images and documents related to Central American archaeology and ethnography from the early 20th century, including many images of important archaeological sites that have since been altered or destroyed.
- The Kensinger Collection has over 5,000 photographs and related field notes and texts from anthropologist Ken Kensinger's research with the Cashinahua of Peru from 1960 to 1996
- The Conti Collection has over 3,000 photographs dating from the late 1950s through to the early 1970s taken by Rhode Island photographer Gino Conti, primarily on the Hopi, Apache and Navaho reservations and in Mexico.
- Photographs of Southwest prehistoric petroglyphs taken by Salvatore Mancini, many of which are published by the Museum in the book Terra Incognita.
- Lithographs, serigraphs, and two dimensional artwork by and about the Inuit, the Ainu, Plains Indians and many others.

== See also ==
- John Whipple Potter Jenks
