= Haffenreffer Brewery =

- U.S. National Register of Historic Places
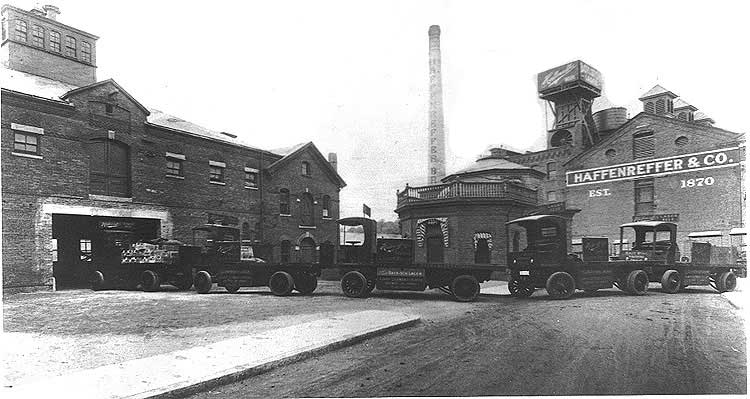
- An undated photograph of the Haffenreffer brewery, which once had a famous tap that poured out free beer day and night. The area was bustling, and on many days the smell of hops filled the air.

- Location within Massachusetts Location within the United States
- Location: Germania Street; Boston, Massachusetts
- Coordinates: 42°18′52″N 71°6′15″W
- Area: 5 acres (2.0 ha)
- Built: 1877
- Architect: M.W. Fitzsimmons et al.
- NRHP reference No.: 82004453
- Added to NRHP: May 2, 1982

The Haffenreffer Brewery, was established in 1870, in Jamaica Plain, Massachusetts. The Haffenreffer Brewery was founded by Rudolph Frederick Haffenreffer, a German immigrant who arrived in Boston after the Civil War.

== History ==
Following Rudolph's death on March 8, 1929, the business became turned over to his sons, Rudolf F. Haffenreffer Jr. (1874–1954) and Theodore Carl Haffenreffer (1880–1956). The brewery was subsequently run by other members of the Haffenreffer family, including Rudolph Frederick Haffenreffer III (1902–1991), his brother Carl W. Haffenreffer (1906–1999), and their first cousin, Theodore Carl Haffenreffer III (1917–2008). Having survived the era of Prohibition and operating for nearly a century, the brewery closed by 1965 leaving Massachusetts at the time without a brewery for the first time in 300 years. Since its close some brands like Haffenreffer Lager Beer, Pickwick Ale and Pickwick Bock Beer became the property of the Narragansett Brewing Company. Other brands included Haffenreffer Private Stock, a legacy of the original Haffenreffer & Co. product line, was a brand of malt liquor that ceased production in 2013. The company's brands had several historical nicknames: The "Haffenwrecker", "The Green Death", due to relatively high alcohol content and "The Green Monster", (referring to the left field wall at Fenway Park). It was notable due to the Rebus puzzles under the bottle cap and due to the label recommendation of consuming it "on the rocks" or over ice.

The first Haffenreffer bottles were plate mold bottles and were produced by Karl Hutter of New York and had the traditional lightning stop tops. According to Haffenreffer company records later in 1876 the Haffenreffer Brewery contracted with Dean Foster and Company of Boston to aid in the production of bottles for the brewery and the growing demand. Starting in 1893, all Haffenreffer bottles were produced with Karl Hutter stoppers.

=== Haffenreffer complex ===
At its pinnacle the complex contained 14-buildings with a tower building, main brewery, storage building, paymaster's office, stables, and an extensive bottling plant, etc.

The main brewery building has been on the National Register of Historic Places since 1982.

=== Real estate development ===
The Jamaica Plain Neighborhood Development Corporation (JPNDC) which owns and operates it today, redeveloped and has rehabbed the entire Haffenreffer complex. Situated blocks from the Stony Brook MBTA station, and the 1980s redeveloped 4-mile long Southwest Corridor Park between Forest Hills and Back Bay; the Boston Beer Company, brewer of Samuel Adams beer, has been an anchor tenant and investor in the complex since the mid-1980s and offers tours of the brewery there.

The top of the smokestack from the old Haffenreffer Brewery crumbled and had been partially restored to current building codes- so the letters on its side read FENREFFER BREWERS for more than 30 years. In late 2016, a local artist installed a circular steel frame on the top with the letters HAF, which restored the smokestack to its full name.

Among those businesses sharing the facilities today along with Boston Beer are:

- Bella Luna Restaurant
- Bikes Not Bombs
- City Life/Vida Urbana
- Children's Music Center of JP
- Keshet
- Kenyon Woodworking
- JP School of Dance
- Mike's Fitness
- The Parent Review
- ULA Cafe
- Women in the Building Trades

== See also ==
- Economy of Boston
- Stony Brook (Charles River tributary, Boston)
- Neighborhoods of Boston
- Private Stock (malt liquor)
- National Register of Historic Places listings in southern Boston, Massachusetts
