= Narragansett Brewing Company =

Rhode Island brewery founded 1890

- Interactive map of Narragansett Brewing Company
- Type: Private company
- Location: Providence, Rhode Island 271 Tockwotton Street
- Coordinates: 41°52′37″N 71°23′21″W
- Opened: 1890
- Annual production volume: 100,000 US beer barrels (120,000 hl) in 2022
- Owner: Mark Hellendrung
- Website: narragansettbeer.com

The Narragansett Brewing Company (/ˌnærəˈɡænsɪt/ neh-ruh-GAN-set) is an American brewery founded in 1890 in Cranston, Rhode Island, and currently based in Providence. Known for its flagship product, Narragansett Lager, the brewery contracts lager production to the Genesee Brewing Company in Rochester, New York. During the mid-20th century, Narragansett was the largest producer of lager beer in New England.

The company has undergone significant transformations, including growth in the early 20th century, adaptations during Prohibition, acquisition by the Falstaff Brewing Corporation in 1965, and the closure of its Cranston facilities in 1983. Revived in 2005, the brand reintroduced its classic beers and established limited production facilities in Providence for small-batch and specialty products.

Narragansett is associated with its slogan, "Hi, Neighbor, have a 'Gansett!", popularized by Boston Red Sox announcer Curt Gowdy. The modern iteration of the company primarily distributes to the Southern New England regional market and produces a variety of lagers, ales, and seasonal offerings.

== History ==
=== Founding and early expansion (1890–1920) ===
The Narragansett Brewing Company was founded in 1890 in Cranston, Rhode Island, by six German-American entrepreneurs including John H. Fehlberg, Augustus F. Borchardt, Herman G. Possner, George M. Gerhard, Constand A. Moeller, and Jacob Wirth. The brewery's name, "Narragansett", is derived from the indigenous Narragansett people, a Native American tribe historically based in the area that is now Rhode Island. The name reflects the region's cultural and historical heritage, as many locations and landmarks in Rhode Island, such as Narragansett Bay and the coastal town of Narragansett, bear the same name. The company was established with an initial capital investment of $150,000, intended to produce lager beer modeled after traditional German brewing methods. Construction of the brewery began in 1889 and included a brewhouse, stables, a blacksmith shop, and storage facilities.

Production at Narragansett began in December 1890, and the company was formally incorporated the following year. In its first year, the brewery produced 397 barrels of beer, growing to 27,887 barrels in the second year. By 1901, Narragansett's production had risen to 115,000 barrels, making it the largest lager beer brewery in New England at the time. Over its first 25 years, the company invested over $4 million in facility expansion, developing a 42-acre site with over 30 buildings. In 1914, Narragansett Brewing constructed a bottling plant and maintained its own ice production plant; modern refrigerated train cars and delivery vehicles were adopted for expanded regional distribution.

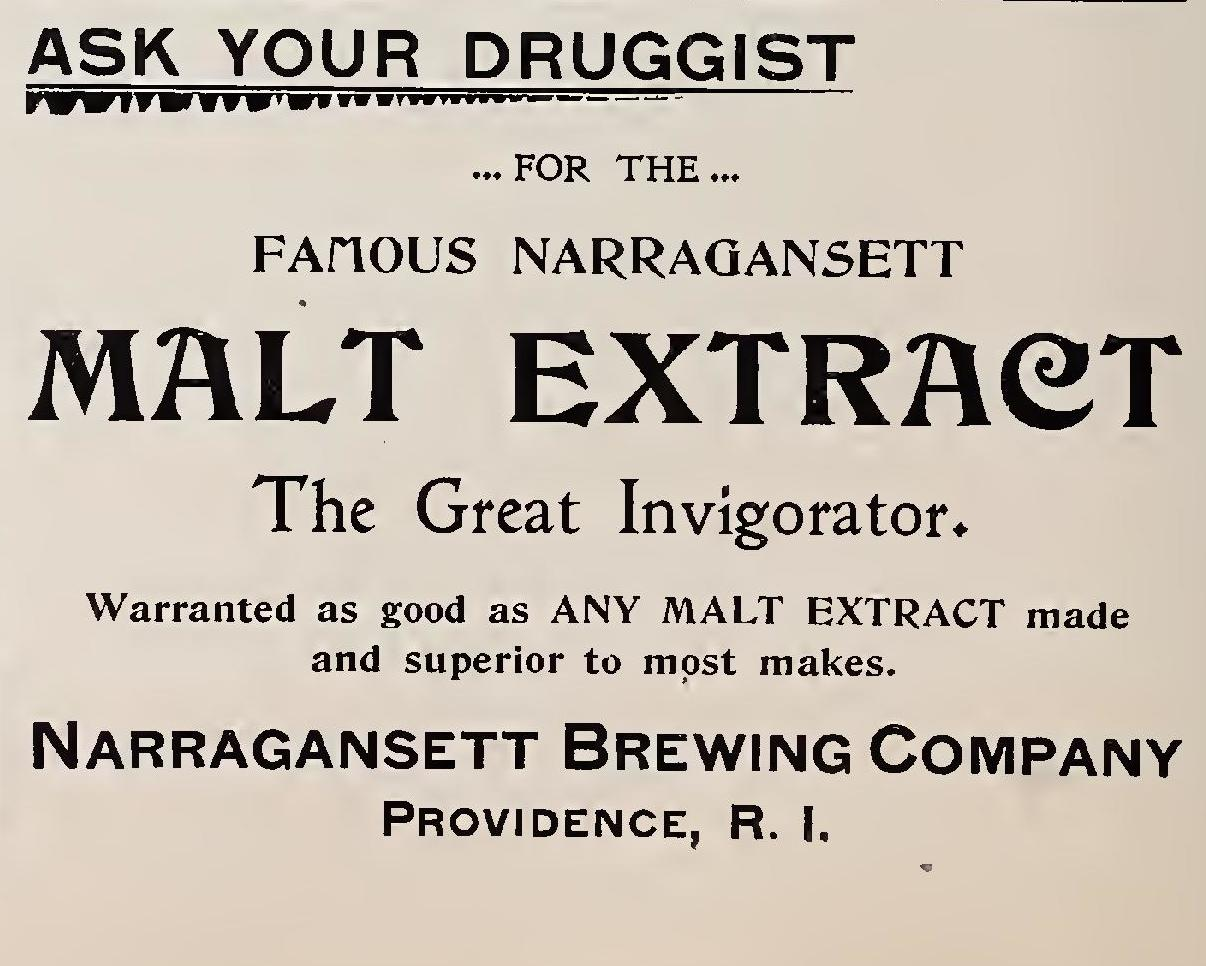
Narragansett Brewing Company Malt Extract was sold during Prohibition

=== Prohibition (1920–1933) ===
During the Prohibition era, the Narragansett Brewing Company adapted its operations to comply with the nationwide ban on alcoholic beverages. The company diversified its product offerings to include non-alcoholic beverages such as ginger ale, sarsaparilla, root beer, and malt extract. Narragansett produced a near beer beverage called "Gansett", with minimal alcohol content. The brewery leveraged its on-site ice production facility and provided cold storage services, delivering 25 tons of ice daily to over 1,500 customers.

Despite diversification efforts, Narragansett Brewing faced significant operational challenges during Prohibition. The brewery had to modify its facilities to accommodate the production of non-alcoholic products and ensure compliance with federal regulations; maintaining financial stability was arduous, as the profit margins from non-alcoholic goods were generally lower than those from beer sales. In 1931, with the anticipated repeal of Prohibition, the Narragansett Brewing Company sought financial assistance and managerial expertise to upgrade its facilities in preparation for renewed beer production; the company approached Rudolf F. Haffenreffer Jr., who had inherited the Haffenreffer Brewery in Boston after his father's passing in 1929. Recognizing the potential for growth, Haffenreffer was appointed the president and chairman of Narragansett and agreed to provide the necessary fiscal support, facilitating significant modernization of the Cranston plant. Following the repeal of Prohibition in December 1933, the company quickly restored lager operations at its Cranston facility. Investment in new equipment allowed for increased production efficiency.

=== Post-Prohibition and mid-century growth (1933–1970) ===
Under Haffenreffer's leadership, Narragansett Brewing Company implemented marketing strategies and expanded its market presence. In 1944, Narragansett became the official beer sponsor of the Boston Red Sox, the first sponsorship of its kind by a regional brewery. This partnership significantly boosted brand visibility through radio broadcasts where Red Sox announcer Curt Gowdy popularized the slogan, "Hi, Neighbor, have a 'Gansett!" The sponsorship continued for over two decades. To accommodate increasing demand, the company relocated to a new plant at Cranston and Garfield Avenues in Cranston, which included a modern bottling plant, in 1951. Haffenreffer would remain president of the company until his death in 1954. By 1959, the brewery's output reached 1 million barrels annually, once again making it the largest lager beer brewery in New England at the time.

By the early 1960s, Narragansett remained a significant regional player but faced increasing operational costs and aging facilities. Competition from national beer brands such as Budweiser and Miller began to intensify, gradually eroding its market share. The company began to evaluate strategies to maintain its market position, including potential mergers and acquisitions. The Haffenreffer brewery in Boston survived until 1965, which had previously licensed products to Narragansett Brewing. In 1965, the Falstaff Brewing Corporation, then the fourth-largest beer producer in the United States, sought to expand its market presence by acquiring the Narragansett Brewing Company, the leading beer seller in New England with approximately 20% of the regional market share. July 15, 1965, Falstaff Brewing purchased the Narragansett Brewing Company for $17 million in cash and $2 million in Falstaff common stock. Two days before the sale, the U.S. government initiated an antitrust lawsuit against Falstaff, expressing concerns that the acquisition could reduce competition in the New England beer market. The government suggested that Falstaff should either distribute its products from existing breweries or construct a new facility in the region to enter the market independently.

=== Legal issues and decline (1970–2005) ===
The case, United States v. Falstaff Brewing Corp., reached the U.S. Supreme Court, which, in 1973, reversed the lower court's decision and remanded the case for further proceedings. The Court held that the District Court erred in assuming that, because Falstaff would not have entered the market de novo, it could not be considered a potential competitor. The Court stated that the District Court should have considered whether Falstaff was a potential competitor in the sense that its position on the edge of the market exerted a beneficial influence on the market's competitive conditions. Despite the ongoing legal challenges, Falstaff proceeded with the acquisition, operating Narragansett as a separate subsidiary during the litigation. In October 1974, nine years after the initial agreement, Falstaff completed the acquisition of Narragansett Brewing Company.

Following the acquisition, the Narragansett brewery faced operational challenges, with increased competition from national brands. The 1970 opening of Anheuser-Busch's facility in Merrimack, New Hampshire, introduced advanced production capabilities and aggressive marketing strategies into the New England market. By the mid-1970s, Narragansett's Cranston facility was operating at maximum capacity, producing approximately 1.7 million barrels annually; however, the plant's outdated equipment and infrastructure hindered efficiency and increased operational costs. Efforts to modernize the facility were limited, and the brewery struggled to compete with the distribution of its national competitors. In On April 8, 1975, Paul Kalmanovitz, a San Francisco-based investor, gained control of the Falstaff Brewing Corporation, Narragansett's parent company. Soon after the purchase, Falstaff's corporate headquarters moved from St. Louis, Missouri to San Francisco, California. Under new ownership, the company sought tax relief and other concessions to mitigate financial challenges but faced difficulties in securing long-term solutions. Additionally, there was a lack of significant investment in marketing and facility upgrades, further contributing to the brand's decline.

Labor disputes emerged as union workers sought better wages and benefits amid the company's financial struggles. By 1980, Narragansett's share of the regional beer market had fallen from approximately 65.5% in 1963 to about 17%. These disputes, coupled with escalating operational costs and declining sales, led to the cessation of production at the Cranston brewery on July 31, 1981, resulting in the layoff of 350 workers. Following the closure of the Cranston facility, production of Narragansett beer was moved to Falstaff's plant in Fort Wayne, Indiana, in 1982. This relocation led to perceptions of diminished product quality among consumers, accelerating the decline in sales, with some referring to it pejoratively as "Nasty Narry". In 1985, Falstaff Brewing was acquired by the Pabst Brewing Company, which included the Narragansett brand. Narragansett's association with New England weakened, and its market presence continued to erode throughout the 1980s and 1990s. After remaining abandoned for over a decade, demolition of the main brewery buildings in Cranston began on October 27, 1998. The last surviving structure, the Narragansett Brewing trolley barn that was formerly used for interurban freight traffic in the early 20th century, was initially spared for redevelopment but was eventually demolished in June 2005. The original signage for the brewery was repurposed as a welcome sign for the town of Narragansett, Rhode Island, with it being relocated to the Route 1 rotary. The Cranston Municipal Courthouse and the Sanford-Brown Institute were both built on the site of the brewery proper. By the early 2000s, Narragansett Beer had become largely obscure, with minimal distribution. The brand was kept alive as minor regional label under Pabst, with fewer than 5,000 cases being produced in 2003.

=== Brand revitalization (2005–present) ===
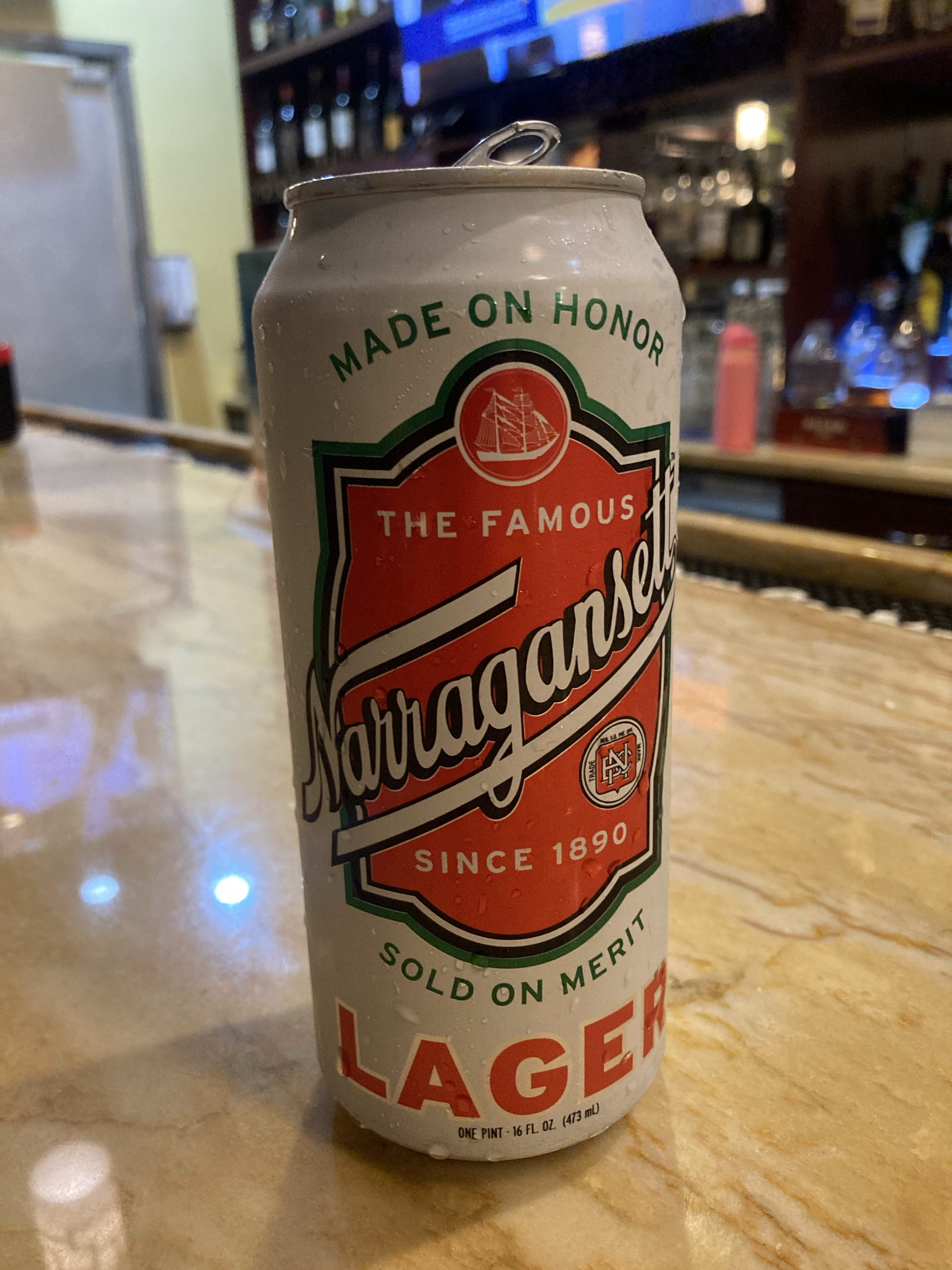
Current Narragansett Lager branding

In October 2005, a group of Rhode Island investors led by Mark Hellendrung acquired the Narragansett Beer brand. Hellendrung, formerly associated with Nantucket Nectars, worked with former Narragansett brewer Bill Anderson to recreate the original recipes. Lager production was contracted to the Genesee Brewing Company in Rochester, New York. This move allowed for immediate distribution while plans for local brewing facilities were developed. New packaging and branding for the lager was developed, with the new iteration of the lager being released to the Southern New England market in Spring 2006. In the years following the reintroduction of the lager, the company expanded its product line to include limited craft offerings that were contracted to third-party breweries in Providence, Rhode Island and Pawcatuck, Connecticut. On April 3, 2016, it was announced that craft brewing operations would be relocating to an industrial site in Pawtucket, Rhode Island to increase production under a co-op agreement. Brewing in Pawtucket began early in 2017, with the first batch produced in March 2017. By 2017, Narragansett had become New England's fifth-largest and the country's 37th-largest craft brewery, with nearly two-thirds of its production dedicated to the Rochester-produced lager.

In 2021, Narragansett Brewing completed the construction of a new 18,000-square-foot brewery and taproom located at Fox Point in Providence, Rhode Island; all craft brewing operations moved from Pawtucket to the Fox Point facility the same year. Distribution of Narragansett Lager was expanded to markets outside of New England during the 2020s. In 2022, the company reported a total depletion volume growth of 5%, returning to its pre-pandemic volume of over 100,000 barrels. This growth was driven across a wide geography, with markets including New York, Virginia, Washington, D.C., and North Carolina. In the first quarter of 2023, Narragansett reported an 8% increase in depletions, an acceleration from the 6% growth observed in the fourth quarter of 2022. This growth was led by their flagship lager, which saw an 11% increase. As of 2023, Narragansett Brewing Company is ranked as the 27th largest craft brewery in the United States.

== Operations and products ==
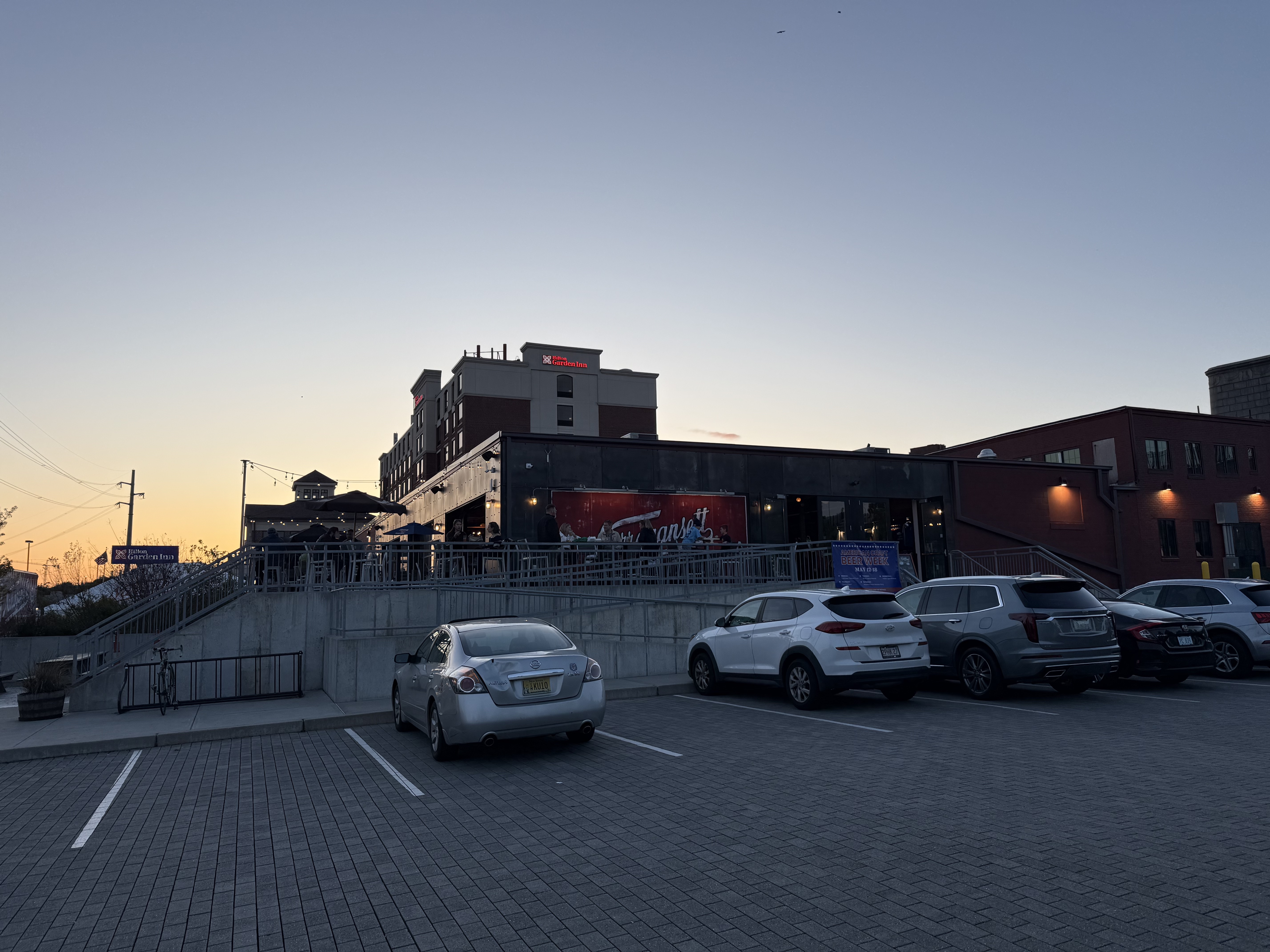
Narragansett Brewing's present-day taproom and headquarters in Providence, Rhode Island

The modern iteration of Narragansett Brewing differs from its 20th century model, with the company being classified as a large-scale independent craft brewing operation, specifically due to the company not being owned or controlled by a significant portion (typically less than 25%) by a larger beverage alcohol company as well as produces less than 6 million barrels of product annually. Since 2021, the Narragansett Brewing Company operates corporate offices from its primary brewery and taproom in Providence, Rhode Island. The Fox Point brewery serves as the company's production hub for small-batch and specialty beers while also operating as the flagship taproom for the brand. Large-scale production, particularly for Narragansett Lager, continues to be contracted to the Genesee Brewing Company in Rochester, New York. This hybrid approach enables the company to maintain cost efficiencies for its high-demand products while maintaining a local Rhode Island brewing presence through its limited craft production in Providence; however, this model has elicited criticism from industry observers that argue that outsourcing production diminishes the authenticity and local identity of the brand, which was originally established in Rhode Island.

Over the years, the company has expanded its product offerings to include a variety of styles that have seen limited distribution:

- Narragansett Atlantic Light Lager: Initially introduced in 2006 as Narragansett Light, a lower-calorie version of the classic lager.
- Del's Shandy: A seasonal collaboration with Del's Lemonade that combines Narragansett Lager with natural lemon flavor, launched in 2014.
- Fresh Catch: A blonde ale brewed with citra hops, designed as a light and crisp beer, marketed as an ideal for pairing with seafood.
- Autocrat Coffee Milk Stout: A collaboration with Autocrat Coffee Syrup, pays homage to the Rhode Island's official drink, coffee milk.
- Narragansett White Christmas Winter Warmer: A Bing Crosby licensed spiced brown ale, sold seasonally.

Additional rotations of small-batch specialty beers are brewed and served on-site at the Fox Point brewery which are not distributed to third-party vendors. The Fox Point facility is prohibited from producing or serving the classic Narragansett Lager itself due to contractual restrictions with the Genesee Brewing Company. On May 30, 2025, Grove Bay Concessions opened the Narragansett Kitchen & Bar, a full-service restaurant insideT.F. Green International Airport which licenses the Narragansett branding.

=== Distribution ===
While maintaining a strong presence in traditional markets like Rhode Island, Massachusetts, and Connecticut, the company has extended its reach to other regions, including the Mid-Atlantic, South, and Midwest. In 2012, the company launched in Wisconsin; in 2015, Narragansett entered markets in Maryland, Delaware, and Pennsylvania, including major cities like Pittsburgh and Erie. By 2018, distribution expanded further into Georgia. In August 2020, Narragansett began distributing in Indiana. The company's product lineup, which includes the flagship Narragansett Lager, Del's Shandy, and seasonal offerings, is widely available in cans, bottles, and on draft. Narragansett partners with retail chains, local stores, and bars to make its beers accessible, and consumers can use the company's online beer finder tool to locate products near them. Within New England, Narragansett Lager is often recognized as a regional macro-scale American lager product (comparable to mass-produced brands like Budweiser or Pabst Blue Ribbon) and is known for its affordability in most markets.

== Advertising and media ==
Under Haffenreffer's leadership post-prohibition, Narragansett greatly expanded its market presence through strategic advertising initiatives into the mid-1900s. In the 1940s, Theodor Geisel, later known as Dr. Seuss, developed advertising materials for the company, including the character "Chief Gansett", which was featured on promotional items such as posters and trays. In addition to sponsoring the Boston Red Sox, Narragansett simultaneously sponsored the Boston Braves during the same time. The "Hi Neighbor! Have a 'Gansett" campaign was introduced after World War II and appeared in newspapers, billboards, and on trolley cars throughout New England.

The Braves switched sponsors to P. Ballantine & Sons in 1950, while the Red Sox retained their relation with Narragansett. Broadcast announcers Jim Britt, Curt Gowdy and Kevin Baker became the unofficial spokespeople for the brand during the mid-century. The first televised commercials for Narragansett beer were produced by Mike Nichols and Elaine May in the early 1960s. In the late 1960s, Narragansett was replaced by F & M Schaefer Brewing as the official sponsor of Red Sox Baseball.

In Steven Spielberg's 1975 film Jaws, the character Captain Quint, portrayed by Robert Shaw, is depicted crushing a can of Narragansett lager. This inclusion was not a result of paid product placement, rather, the beer's inclusion in the film was likely a matter of convenience. The production was filmed on the island of Martha's Vineyard, Massachusetts, and Narragansett was widely available in New England during that time, making the lager a practical prop for the filmmakers to easily acquire on the island. There is no evidence to suggest that the beer's inclusion was the result of a deliberate regional authenticity-driven decision by the filmmakers; however, by the 2010s the brand became widely associated with the film. In October 2012, Narragansett reintroduced a can design from 1975, which was featured in Jaws. By the mid-2020s, the brand would include the likeness of Robert Shaw as Captain Quint within marketing materials alongside the slogan "Crush it Like Quint." In summer 2025, Narragansett offered a "Crush it Like Quint Summer Blockbuster Giveaway" sweepstakes in commemoration of the fiftieth anniversary of the Jaws film.

During the 1980s, the company's marketing efforts were insufficient to counteract the challenges posed by outdated facilities and the growing dominance of national brands. The 1990s saw the brand largely dormant, with minimal to no marketing until the brand was relaunched in 2005. While conducting market tests for the new iteration of Narragansett Lager during this time, the company introduced rebus puzzles (often depicting common phrases or jokes) on the underside of bottle caps and coasters, which later became an iconic aspect of the brand that is continued into the present day. In 2008, Narragansett partnered with Marlo Marketing to develop a public relations campaign aimed at reeducating consumers and reestablishing the brand as a regional beer.

Narragansett has been featured in several small-scale productions, such as the 2020 film The Block Island Sound, the third episode of the 2020-21 miniseries The Stand, the 2021-22 miniseries Dexter: New Blood, the 2025 limited series Sirens, and the first episode of the 2026 second season of Dexter: Resurrection. Narragansett sponsors the NecronomiCon Providence conference, and produced related H. P. Lovecraft-themed beer releases. Most marketing for the modern iteration of the Narragansett Brewing Company is conducted through social media engagement. The brand offers extensive lines of merchandise, ranging from product signage, glassware, barware and clothing.

== See also ==
- Boston Beer Company
- Rudolf F. Haffenreffer
