= Pete Nelson =

American treehouse builder

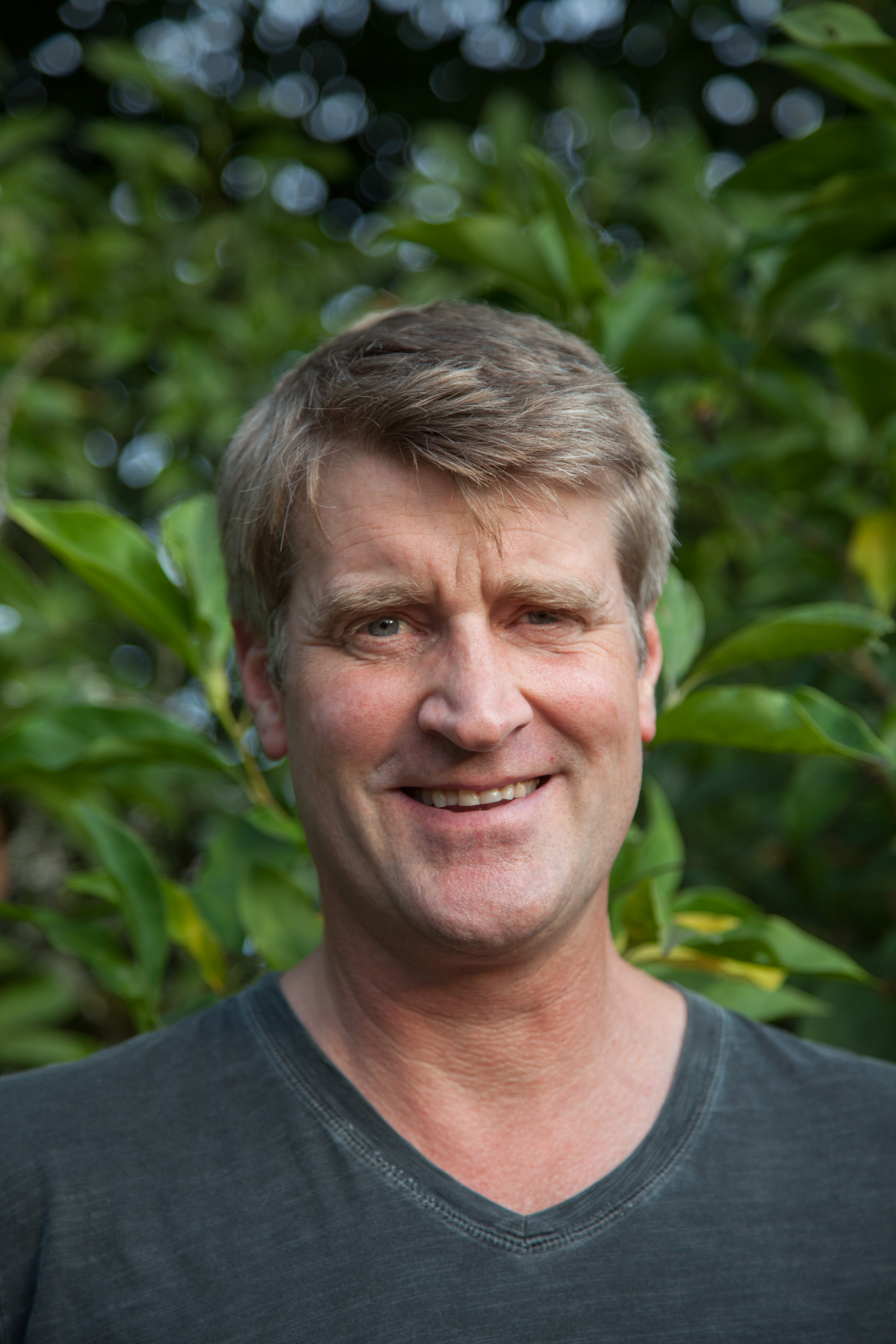
- Born: Peter Nelson; June 4, 1962 (age 64); Ridgewood, NJ
- Occupations: Master treehouse builder, television host, author
- Known for: Host of Animal Planet's Treehouse Masters, builder, author
- Notable work: As author: Treehouses: The Art and Craft of Living Out on a Limb (as Peter Nelson, pub. 1994), Home Tree Home: Principles of Treehouse Construction and Other Tall Tales (with Gerry Hadden, Penguin Books, 1997), The Treehouse Book (by Peter & Judy Nelson, Universe, 2000), Treehouses of the World (Harry N. Abrams, 2004), New Treehouses of the World (Harry N. Abrams, 2009), Be in a Treehouse: Design / Construction / Inspiration (2014)

Pete Nelson (born June 4, 1962) is an American master treehouse builder, author, and, from 2013 to 2018, host of the Animal Planet television show Treehouse Masters.

== Personal life ==
Nelson became excited about treehouses at the age of 5 when his dad built him a tree fort behind the garage of their Ridgewood, New Jersey home, but it wasn't until 1987 that he built his first adult treehouse in his Colorado Springs backyard. He is a graduate of Deerfield Academy and Colorado College in Colorado Springs.

Nelson runs Nelson Treehouse and Supply, a treehouse building and supply company, and Treehouse Point, a treehouse Bed & Breakfast located outside of Seattle. Until 2018, Nelson hosted Animal Planet’s television series, Treehouse Masters.

He lives with his wife, Judy, in Fall City, Washington and has three adult children, all of whom work in the family treehouse-building business.

== Career ==
In 1987, Nelson's dream of a career in treehouses was rekindled by the book How to Build Treehouses, Huts and Forts by David Stiles that was sent to him by a high school friend and shortly thereafter, he built his first adult treehouse in his back yard in Colorado Springs, moving to Washington State that same year, where he built homes and started writing books about treehouses.

Nelson owns and operates Nelson Treehouse & Supply in Fall City, WA, 30 miles outside of Seattle and the company is a family affair, with wife Judy, daughter Emily and sons Charlie and Henry, all involved.

The 1994 publication of Treehouses: The Art and Craft of Living Out on a Limb inspired him to write 5 more books on the subject. His latest book, titled Be in a Treehouse, details the technical aspects of building in the trees along with showcasing treehouses from all over the world.

In 1997 Nelson co-founded the Tree-House Workshop. In 2006, Nelson opened Treehouse Point, a bed-and-breakfast composed entirely of treehouses, near Fall City outside of Seattle, WA. In 2011, he founded Nelson Treehouse and Supply, a high end treehouse design, construction and supply business based out of Fall City, Washington.

In 2013, Animal Planet launched Treehouse Masters, a documentary series which shows Nelson and his crew traveling the world, building treehouses. As of 2015, the show was averaging 1.3 million viewers per episode.

In 2016, Nelson collaborated with country music star Zac Brown to build a 1,300 square foot treehouse at Brown's Camp Southern Ground, a non-profit designed to serve children with neuro-developmental disorders as well as children from military families struggling with PTSD.
