= Samuel Adams (beer) =

American brand of beer

Samuel Adams Boston Lager
- Type: Lager
- Manufacturer: Boston Beer Company
- Origin: United States
- Introduced: 1984
- Alcohol by volume: 5.0%
- Color: Amber
- Website: Official website

Samuel Adams (often shortened to Sam Adams) is the flagship brand of the Boston Beer Company. It is named after US Founding Father Samuel Adams, who inherited his father's brewery on Boston's King Street (modern day State Street) and worked as a brewer or maltster. Samuel Adams beer is brewed by the Boston Beer Company, which was founded by Jim Koch in Cambridge, Massachusetts, where he started the micro-brewery in his home. Koch comes from a long line of Cincinnati brewers, and Samuel Adams beer was started using a recipe now known as Samuel Adams Boston Lager.

== Beers ==
=== Year-round ===
Beer	Pack	% ABV	IBU	Description
Boston Lager	6, 12, 24, 28 (bottles, 12 oz. & 16 oz. cans)	5.0	30	An amber lager and the flagship product of Boston Brewing Company. Boston Lager is brewed according to Boston Brewing Company founder Jim Koch's great-great grandfather's recipe. "Remastered" in 2023 via a change in the brewing process to be "easier-drinking." Also available in the "Beer Fest" variety pack.
American Light	6, 12, 24 (bottles, 12 oz. cans, 24 oz. cans)	4.2	7	A light American-style lager. Also available in the "Primetime Beers" and "Beers of Summer" variety packs.
New England Juicy IPA	6, 12 (12 oz. cans, 16 oz. cans, 19.2 oz. cans)	7.0	35	A juicy New England-style India pale ale.
Cherry Wheat	6 (bottles)	5.3	23	An American-style wheat ale brewed with Michigan cherries and honey.
Just the Haze IPA	6, 12 (12 oz. cans)	< 0.5	35	A non-alcoholic hazy IPA, with 98 calories per 12 oz.
Golden	6 (12 oz. cans)	0.5	12	A non-alcoholic lager, with 98 calories per 12 oz.

=== Seasonal ===
Beer	Pack	% ABV	IBU	Availability	Description
Cold Snap	6, 12 (bottles, 12 oz. cans)	5.3	10	January	An unfiltered white ale brewed with orange peel and spices, reformulated in 2023 to be "smoother and more refreshing." Also available as part of the "Primetime Beers" variety pack.
Breakaway Blonde Ale	6, 12 (bottles, 12 oz. cans)	4.7	15	January	A blonde, light-bodied ale. Also available as part of the "Primetime Beers" variety pack.
Postseason IPA	Spring variety pack (12 oz. cans)	4.5	30	January	A session IPA with tropical notes. Available exclusively in the "Primetime Beers" variety pack.
Summer Ale	6, 12, 24 (bottles, 12 oz. & 16 oz. cans)	5.3	8	April	A wheat ale brewed with citrus and grains of paradise. Also available in the "Beers of Summer" variety pack.
Porch Rocker	6, 12 (bottles, 12 oz. cans)	4.5	8	April	A radler brewed with lemon purée. Also available in the "Beers of Summer" variety pack.
Blueberry Lager	Summer variety pack (12 oz. cans)	5.5	15	April	A lager brewed with blueberry juice. Available exclusively in the "Beers of Summer" variety pack.
OctoberFest	6, 12, 24 (bottles, 12 oz. cans)	5.3	16	August	A Marzen brewed for the start of fall. Also available in the "Beer Fest" variety pack.
Jack-O	6, 12 (bottles, 12 oz. cans)	4.4	8	August	A pumpkin ale. Also available in the "Beer Fest" variety pack.
Flannel Fest	Fall variety pack (12 oz. cans)	5.2	20	August	A Munich-style Dunkel. Available exclusively in the "Beer Fest" variety pack.
Winter Lager	6, 12 (bottles, 12 oz. cans)	5.6	22	November	A spiced wheat bock brewed in celebration of the holiday season. Also available in the "Beers for Cheers" variety pack.
Holiday White Ale	6, 12 (bottles, 12 oz. cans)	5.8	8	November	A spiced white ale, formerly marketed as "White Christmas." Also available in the "Beers for Cheers" variety pack.
Old Fezziwig	6 (bottles, 12 oz. cans)	5.9	25	November	A spiced winter warmer. Also available in the "Beers for Cheers" variety pack.
Oaked Vanilla Porter	Winter variety pack (12 oz. cans)	5.8	35	November	A porter with notes of chocolate, coffee, and vanilla. Available exclusively in the "Beers for Cheers" variety pack.

=== Utopias ===
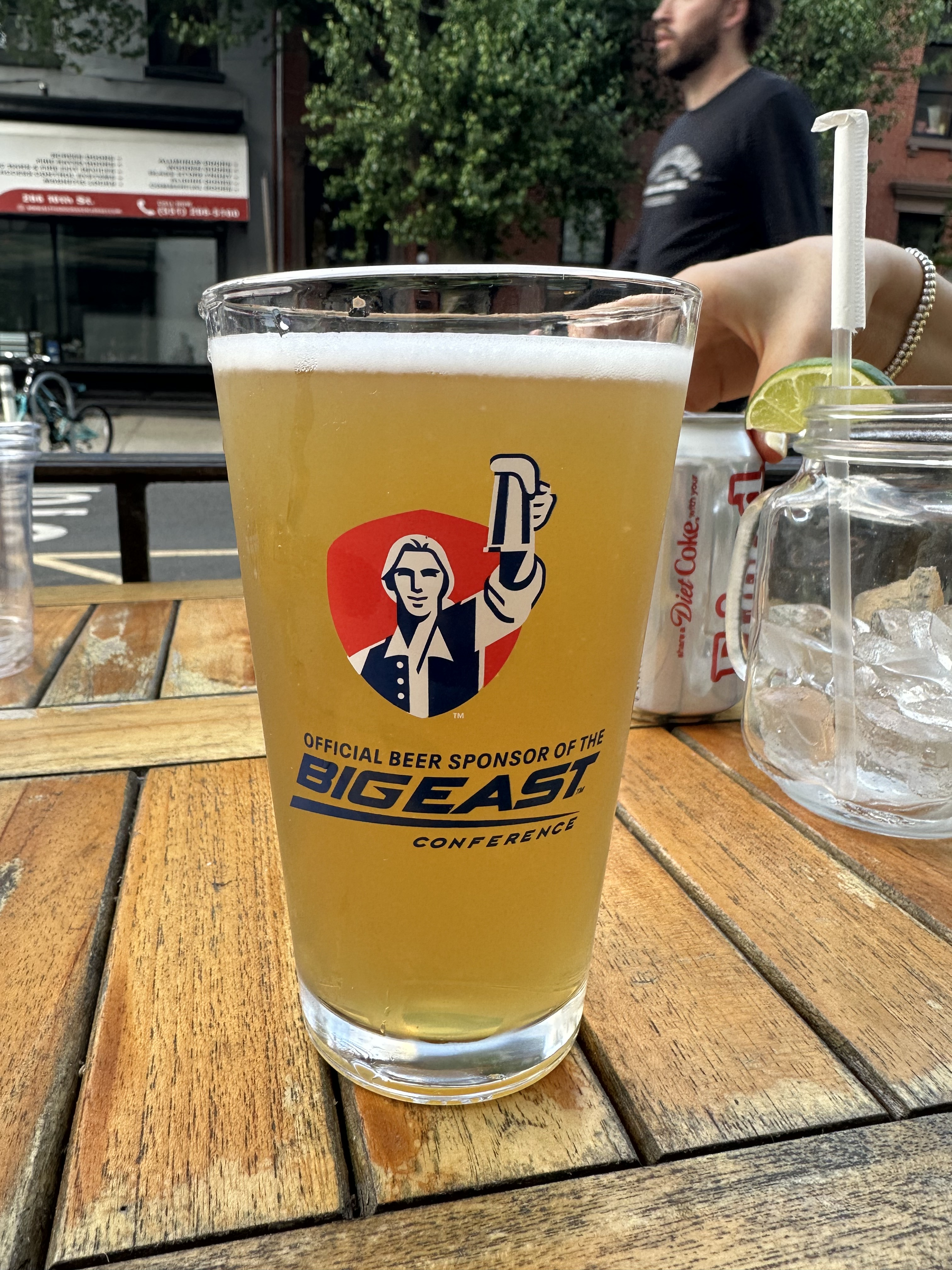
A pint of Sam Adams Summer Ale

In 2002, the company released Utopias. At 24% abv, it was marketed as the strongest commercial beer in the world (a mark that has since been challenged). The company subsequently released new "vintages" of Utopias annually, increasing the alcoholic content to 27% abv by 2007, and increasing further to 28% abv in 2019.

Utopias is made with caramel, Vienna, Moravian and Bavarian smoked malts, and four varieties of noble hops: Hallertauer Mittelfrüh, Tettnanger, Spalter, and Saaz hops. The beer is matured in scotch, cognac and port barrels for almost a year. A limited number of bottles are released each year; in 2007, only 12,000 bottles were produced, and in 2009, only 9,000 bottles were released. Sold in a ceramic bottle resembling a copper-finished brewing kettle, a single bottle of Utopias cost $100 in 2002, $150 in 2009, $200 in 2017, and $210 in 2019.

Because of legal restrictions, Utopias is not offered in the states of Alabama, Arkansas, Georgia, Idaho, Missouri, Mississippi, Montana, New Hampshire, North Carolina, Oklahoma, Oregon, South Carolina, Utah, Vermont, or West Virginia.

== Official beer of the Red Sox ==
Beginning with the 2018 season, Samuel Adams became the official beer of the Boston Red Sox replacing Budweiser. The eight-year deal was slated to last through the 2025 season and include signage at Fenway Park. The agreement also allows Boston Beer to use the Red Sox logo for marketing purposes, as well as to conduct Red Sox related contests with tickets to games. In 2025, the agreement was extended for an additional ten years, and will thus culminate in 2035, unless renewed again.

As of 2020, Samuel Adams's Wicked Fenway IPA (formerly Fenway Faithful IPA), a session IPA offered at 5.5% ABV, is the official beer of the Boston Red Sox. Samuel Adams also created beers featuring cans with the likenesses of Red Sox players Alex Bregman and Garrett Crochet.

== Brewery ==
The Boston Brewery opened in 1987 and, aside from the Boston Lager, is where every beer was first made. There are two other breweries, located in Cincinnati, Ohio and Lehigh Valley, Pennsylvania. The Boston Brewery facility located at the Haffenreffer–JPNDC Brewery Small Business Complex in the neighborhood of Jamaica Plain is open for public tours and tastings.

=== Taproom(s) ===
In 2020 the company saw the opening of a prominent Sam Adams Boston taproom situated in Faneuil Hall Plaza, adjacent to Boston City Hall (along Congress Street) and located steps from downtown Boston's iconic statue of Samuel Adams landmark.

== Media ==
Samuel Adams beer has gained attention in the media for its various beers. In a list of "Best Christmas/Winter Beer in Each State", Samuel Adams' Fezziwig brew won in Massachusetts. Additionally, Samuel Adams brewery itself was named the best brewery in all of Massachusetts according to a Yelp-based Buzzed article.

In the 2015 musical Hamilton, in the song "Aaron Burr, Sir," John Laurens sings "I'm John Laurens in the place to be, two pints of Sam Adams, but I'm workin' on three".

== See also ==
- Truly (brand)
