= Boston Beer Company =

American beverage company

Coordinates: 42.3145°N 71.1030°W

The Boston Beer Company, Inc.
- Type: Public
- Traded as: NYSE: SAM (Class A); S&P 600 component
- Industry: Alcoholic beverage
- Founded: 1984
- Founders: Jim Koch, Rhonda Kallman
- Headquarters: Boston, Massachusetts, U.S.
- Key people: Jim Koch; Chairman, President and Chief Executive Officer; Diego Reynoso; Chief Financial Officer and Treasurer; Phil Hodges; Chief Supply Chain Officer; Michael Crowley; Chief Sales Officer; Annette Fritsch; Vice President of Product Design, Research and Development
- Production output: 5.3 million US beer barrels (6,200,000 hL) in 2019
- Brands: Samuel Adams; Twisted Tea; Angry Orchard; Truly Hard Seltzer; Coney Island Brewing; Angel City Brewery; Dogfish Head Brewery
- Revenue: ▲US$1.329 billion (2019)
- Operating income: ▲US$144.91 million (2019)
- Net income: ▲US$110.04 million (2019)
- Total assets: ▲US$1.054 billion (2019)
- Total equity: ▲US$735.64 million (2019)
- Number of employees: 2,128 (2019)
- Subsidiaries: Dogfish Head Brewery
- Website: www.bostonbeer.com

The Boston Beer Company is an American brewery founded in 1984 by James "Jim" Koch and Rhonda Kallman. Boston Beer Company's first brand of beer was named Samuel Adams after Founding Father Samuel Adams, an American revolutionary patriot. Since its founding, Boston Beer has started several other brands, and in 2019 completed a merger with Dogfish Head Brewery.

The Boston Beer Company is the fourth largest brewer in the United States, with products available throughout the United States and internationally.

== History ==
=== Early history ===
The Boston Beer Company was founded in 1984 by James "Jim" Koch and Rhonda Kallman. The initial beer offering was Samuel Adams Boston Lager, a 4.8% abv amber or Vienna lager. Koch, the sixth-generation, first-born son to follow in his family's brewing footsteps, brewed his first batch of the beer in his kitchen, using the original family recipe for Louis Koch Lager. At the time, Koch was working at Boston Consulting Group after receiving BA, MBA and JD degrees from Harvard University. While serving in his role as a manufacturing consultant at BCG, Koch developed a business plan for a locally focused beer company. He invested $100,000 of his own money and raised additional funds from investors, family members, and friends including former classmates and BCG colleagues. The company was organized as a limited liability partnership; most early investors did not have active roles in the company. However, one early investor, John B. Wing, held a board seat until 2002.

Koch named his beer after the Boston patriot Samuel Adams, who fought for American independence, and who also had inherited a brewing tradition from his father. In March 1985, Koch introduced the beer as Samuel Adams Boston Lager over Patriot's Day weekend, which honors the first battle of the American Revolution and today is more widely known for the running of the Boston Marathon. Six weeks later, Samuel Adams was voted "Best Beer in America" at the Great American Beer Festival, in which 93 national and regional beers competed. The beer was first put on tap at Doyle's Cafe in Jamaica Plain.

Initially, Koch rented excess capacity and brewed the beer at the Pittsburgh Brewing Company, best known for their Iron City brand of beer. As sales increased Koch developed other contract arrangements at various brewing facilities with excess capacity, ranging from Stroh breweries, Portland's original Blitz-Weinhard brewery (shuttered in 1999), Cincinnati's Hudepohl-Schoenling brewery (eventually purchased by the Boston Beer Company in early 1997), and industry giant SABMiller. The Boston Beer Company also has a small R&D brewery located in Boston (Jamaica Plain), Massachusetts, where public tours and beer tastings are offered. The brewery occupies part of the premises of the old Haffenreffer Brewery.

=== 1990s–present ===
In 1997, Jim Koch returned to his hometown of Cincinnati to purchase the Hudepohl-Schoenling Brewery, where his father apprenticed in the 1940s. This was also an important step the company took to reduce reliance on contract brewing.

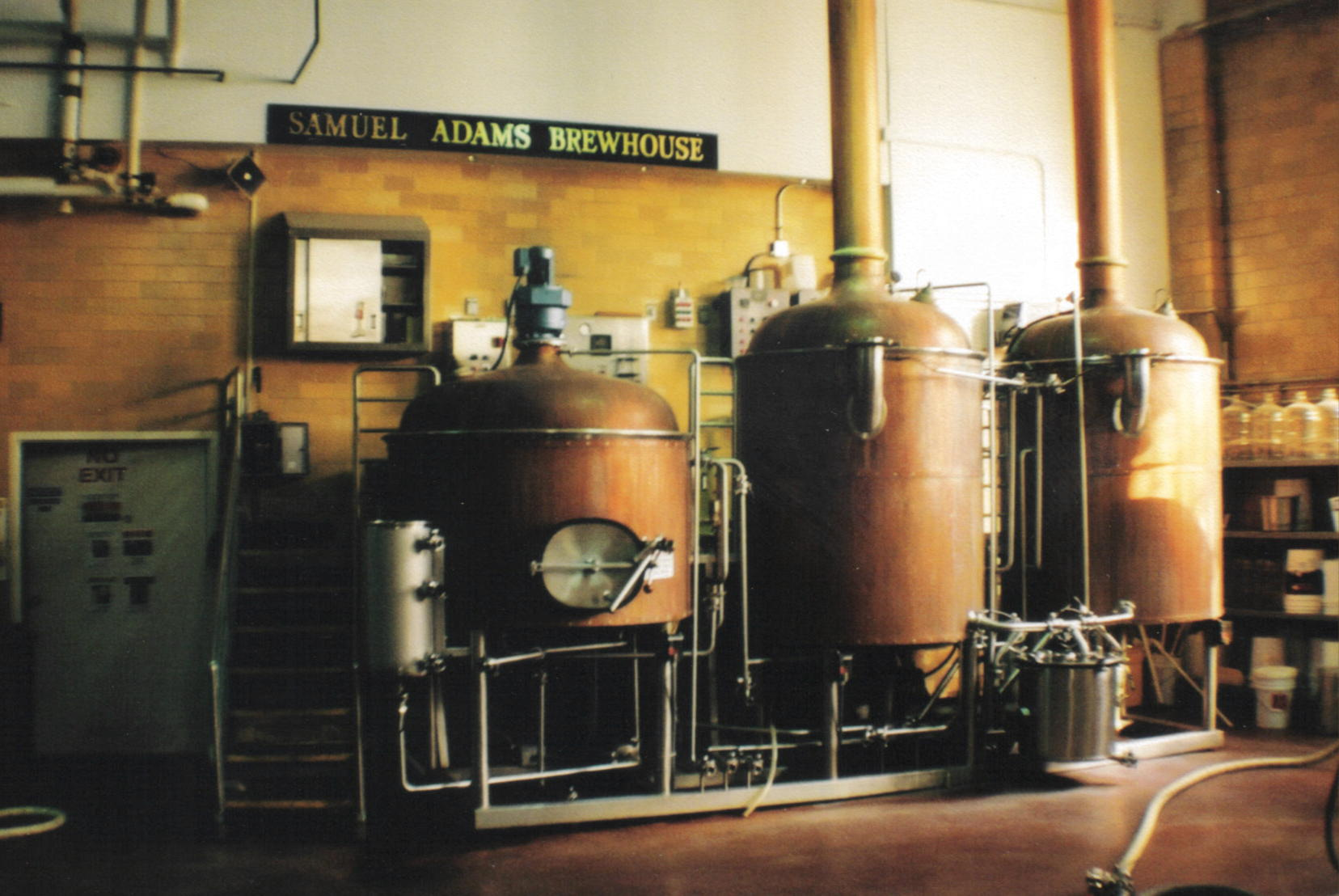
Brew kettles at the Samuel Adams Boston Brewery

The Boston Beer Company went public, selling shares of Class A Common Stock on the New York Stock Exchange, under the ticker symbol, "SAM". These shares, however, have no voting rights, while the company is controlled through its Class B Common Stock, of which Koch owns 100% of the shares.

Boston Beer launched Hardcore Cider in 1997, and Twisted Tea brand in 2000. In 2007, the Boston Beer Company purchased the former F. & M. Schaefer Brewing Company brewery in Breinigsville, Pennsylvania, in the Lehigh Valley. The brewery had been owned by Diageo North America, Inc. and used for the production of Smirnoff Ice malt beverages since 2001. By 2012, Samuel Adams was producing two-thirds of all its beer at the Breinigsville facility, and it has increased brewing capacity there. In 2012 Boston Beer Company launched the Angry Orchard hard cider company based in Cincinnati, Ohio.

From 2000 to 2002, the company sponsored a radio show on WNEW-FM in New York called Opie & Anthony. The hosts created a promotion called "Sex for Sam", in which hosts Opie and Anthony encouraged couples to have sex in notable public places in New York City. On August 15, 2002, a Virginia couple was charged with public lewdness after attempting to have sex in a vestibule at St. Patrick's Cathedral; this led to the firing of the radio hosts a week later.

In October 2007, in an incident referred to by The Wall Street Journal as "Sam Adams v. Sam Adams", the Boston Beer Company demanded that control of the domain names "samadamsformayor.com" and "mayorsamadams.com" be turned over to the company. The domains had been purchased by an employee of the Portland, Oregon radio station NewsRadio 1190 KEX for the campaign of Portland mayoral candidate, Sam Adams. In a cease-and-desist letter, the company expressed concern that consumers might confuse the mayoral candidate with their beer. In an interview with the Associated Press the company said it was willing to discuss Adams' use of his name on his Web sites, "probably for the length of the time the election is being held".

In April 2008, the Boston Beer Company issued its first product recall because of potential defects found in certain 12-US-fluid-ounce (350 ml) glass bottles manufactured by a third-party supplier which, at the time, supplied about a quarter of the bottles the Boston Beer Company used. The Boston Beer Company stated that they believed fewer than 1% of bottles from the supplier could contain small pieces of glass and issued a recall for the safety of consumers. There were no reports of injuries. News of the recall led to shares of the company temporarily dropping by more than 3%.

On July 4, 2013, a video commercial for Sam Adams beer was rolled out on the July 4th holiday that created controversy over an omitted phrase. The manufacturer decided to leave out "endowed by their creator" in its invocation of the Declaration of Independence which outraged critics. But Sam Adams said they were just following trade association rules. The company said in a statement: "The Beer Institute Advertising Code says, 'Beer advertising and marketing materials should not include religion or religious themes.' We agree with that and try to adhere to these guidelines."

As of 2014, the company had 1,325 employees at its breweries in Boston, Massachusetts; Cincinnati, Ohio; and Breinigsville, Pennsylvania.

In 2018, the company pushed for changes to the definition of "craft brewery" in order to accommodate a continuing shift away from beer-only operations toward other brewed products including ciders.

On May 9, 2019, Boston Beer Company acquired Delaware-based Dogfish Head Brewery for $300 million. As part of the merger, Dogfish Head owner Sam Calagione and his wife, Mariah, became the second largest non-institutional owners of Boston Beer Company.

In 2020, Boston Beer Company invested $85 million in its Cincinnati plant to quadruple its canning capacity of Samuel Adams, Angry Orchard, Twisted Tea, and Truly Hard Seltzer.

== Products ==
Samuel Adams Boston Lager

Following Jim Koch's great-great grandfather's recipe, Samuel Adams continued to use traditional brewing processes, including decoction mash (a four vessel process) and krausening (a secondary fermentation). Boston Lager is also dry hopped using the Hallertau Mittelfrueh and Tettnang Tettnanger hops.

Samuel Adams Rebel IPA

First brewed in 2014, Samuel Adams Rebel IPA is a West Coast style India pale ale. The beer is brewed with five American hops—American Cascade, Simcoe, Chinook, Centennial, and Amarillo. In early 2015, Samuel Adams released Rebel Rouser, a double India Pale Ale, and Rebel Rider, a session India Pale Ale. Rebel IPA is no longer brewed outside of occasional taproom releases, and the Samuel Adams brand now sells New England Juicy IPA nationally, and Samuel Adams East Coast IPA regionally.

Sam Adams Light

Introduced in 2001, Sam Adams Light was the second light beer the company brewed. The company previously sold Boston Lightship, which was introduced in 1987.

Samuel Adams Barrel Room Collection

These Belgian style beers are left in large wood barrels to age and pick up some of the flavors of the wood. The beers in this collection are American Kriek, New World, Stony Brook Red, Thirteenth Hour and Tetravis.

Samuel Adams Utopias

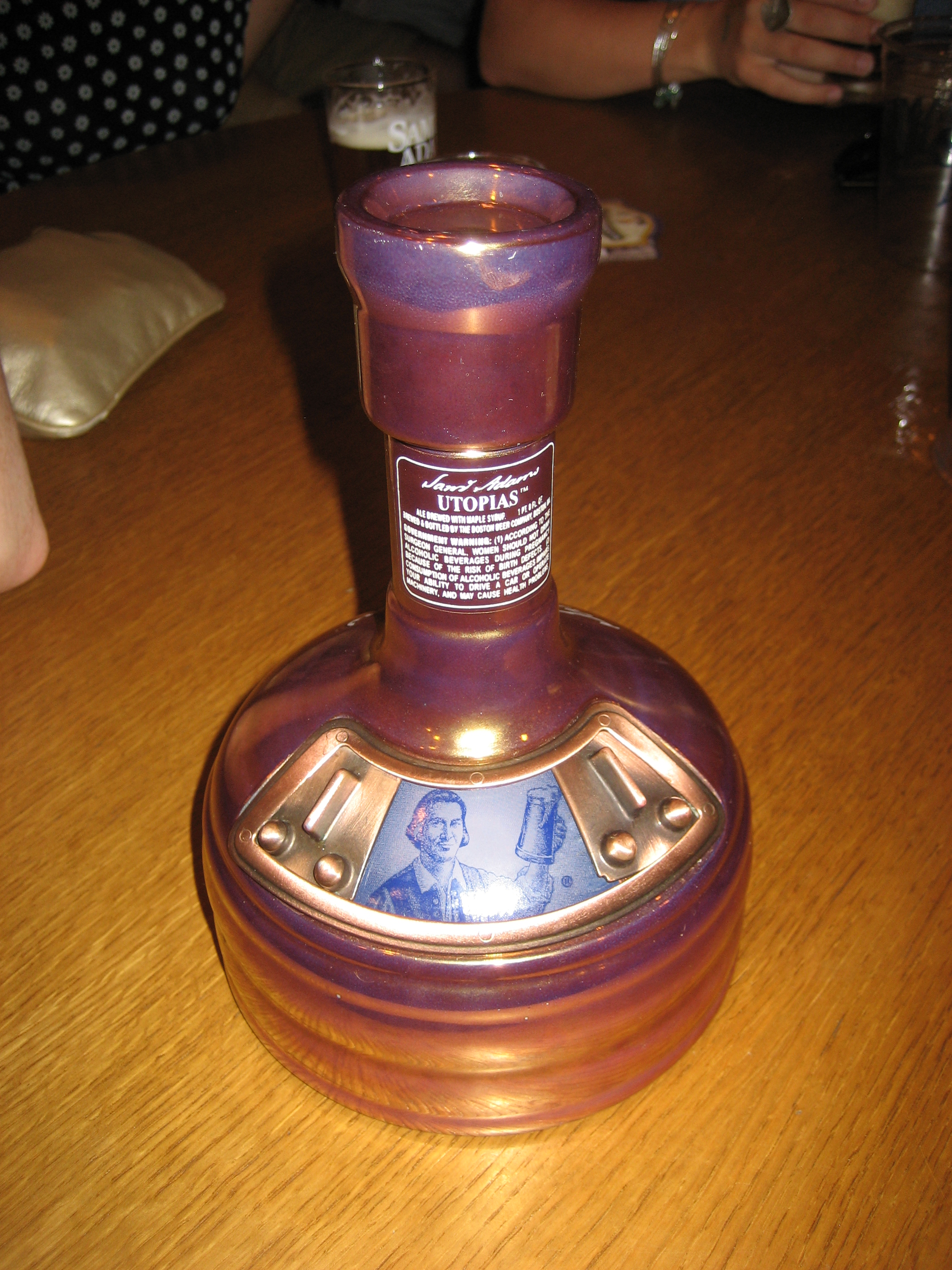
A Samuel Adams Utopias beer bottle

The company followed this up in 2002 with Utopias; at 24% ABV, it was marketed as the strongest commercial beer in the world (a mark that has since been challenged). The company subsequently released new "vintages" of Utopias annually, increasing the alcoholic content to 27% ABV by 2007. The 2025 edition had a 30% ABV.

Utopias is made with caramel, Vienna, Moravian and Bavarian smoked malts, and four varieties of noble hops: Hallertauer Mittelfrüh, Tettnanger, Spalter, and Saaz hops. The beer is matured in scotch, cognac and port barrels for the better part of a year. A limited number of bottles are released each year; in 2007, only 12,000 bottles were produced, and in 2009, only 9,000 bottles were released. Sold in a ceramic bottle resembling a copper-finished brewing kettle, a single bottle of Utopias cost $100 in 2002, $150 in 2009, and $240 in 2025.

Because of legal restrictions, Utopias is not offered in the states of Alabama, Georgia, Idaho, New Hampshire, North Carolina, Oregon, South Carolina, Vermont, or West Virginia.

Cranberry Lambic

Since 1990, the company has produced a seasonal fruit beer labeled "Cranberry Lambic". "Lambic" describes a spontaneously fermented beer generally produced in Brussels or the nearby Pajottenland region, and the Samuel Adams product is not spontaneously fermented, consumers and brewers charged that "Cranberry Lambic" was mislabeled and could cause consumer confusion. Michael Jackson, a leading beer critic, called it "a misleading name". Grant Wood, Senior Brewing Manager at Boston Beer, defended the name, saying, "I wouldn't consider it mislabeling. Whenever I have served the Cranberry Lambic, I have always been really up front about it. Is it a true lambic made in that region in Belgium? No. Does it taste like one? Yes. So it's sort of our homage to the style without the pain and agony of it."

Triple Bock

Triple Bock was released in 1994, 1995, and 1997. It has a black, opaque color, no carbonation, and at 17.5% ABV it was the strongest beer brewed at the time it was introduced. Maple syrup was added in the brewing process. Triple Bock was a "forerunner" of later strong beers from Samuel Adams—Millennium (21% ABV released in 1999 only), and Utopias (24–26% ABV first released in 2002).

Seasonal beers

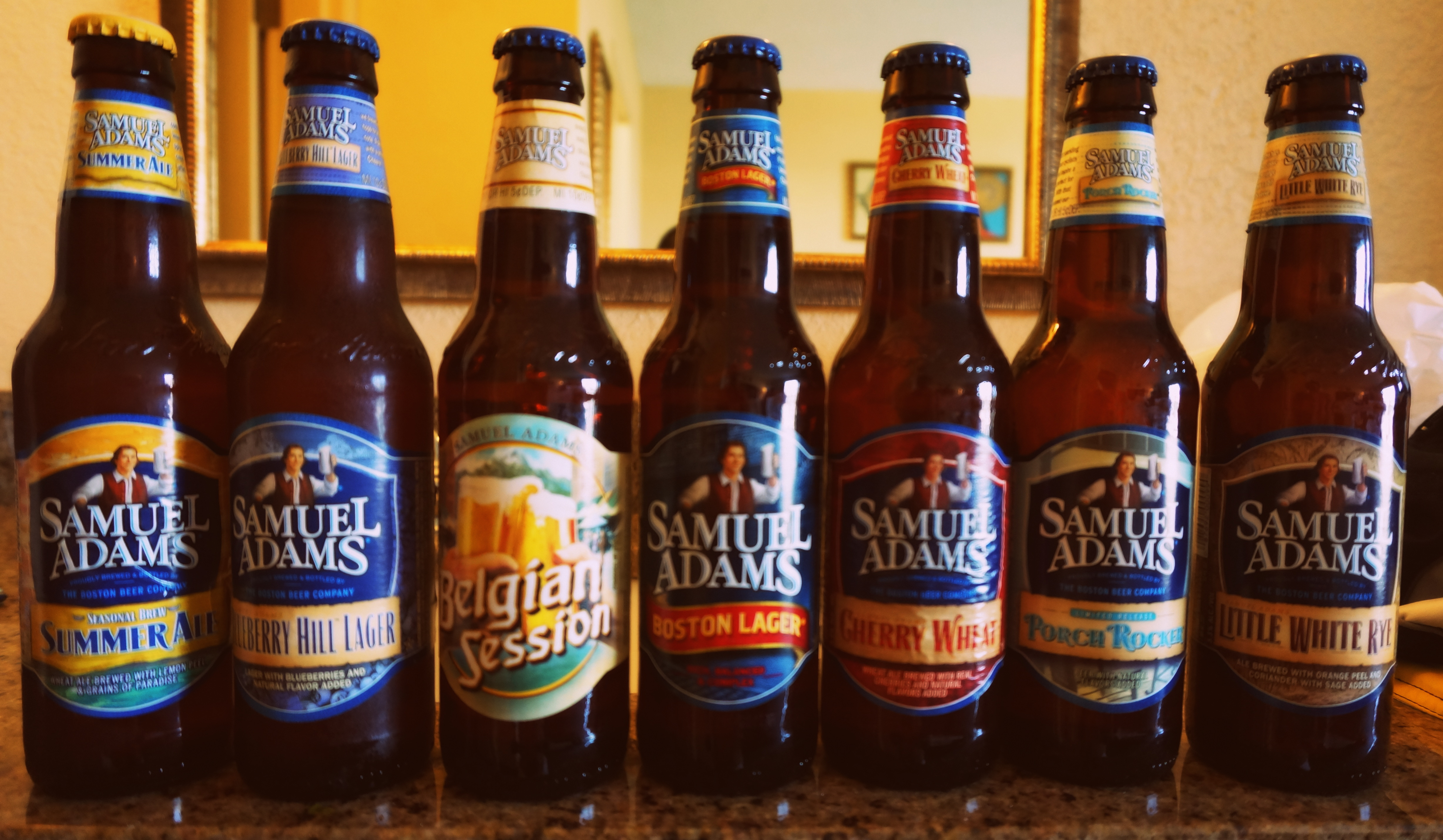
A variety of Samuel Adams seasonal beer

In addition to year-round offerings, Samuel Adams also has four seasonal offerings. The spring seasonal beers are Cold Snap, a witbier and Escape Route, a kölsch. The spring seasonals are sold from January to March. The Summer offerings are available from April through August and include Summer Ale, a wheat ale and Porch Rocker, a radler. The Autumn seasonal beers are available August through October and are Octoberfest, a marzen and Pumpkin Batch, a saison with pumpkin. The Winter/Holiday seasonal beers are available November through December and are, Winter Lager, a bock, and White Christmas, an ale.

Samuel Adams also offers seasonal variety packs that include a mix of year-round and seasonal offerings.

Hard cider

Samuel Adams began offering ciders in 1995. The company has both year-round and seasonal cider offerings, which since 2012 have been sold under the Angry Orchard brand name.

Twisted Tea

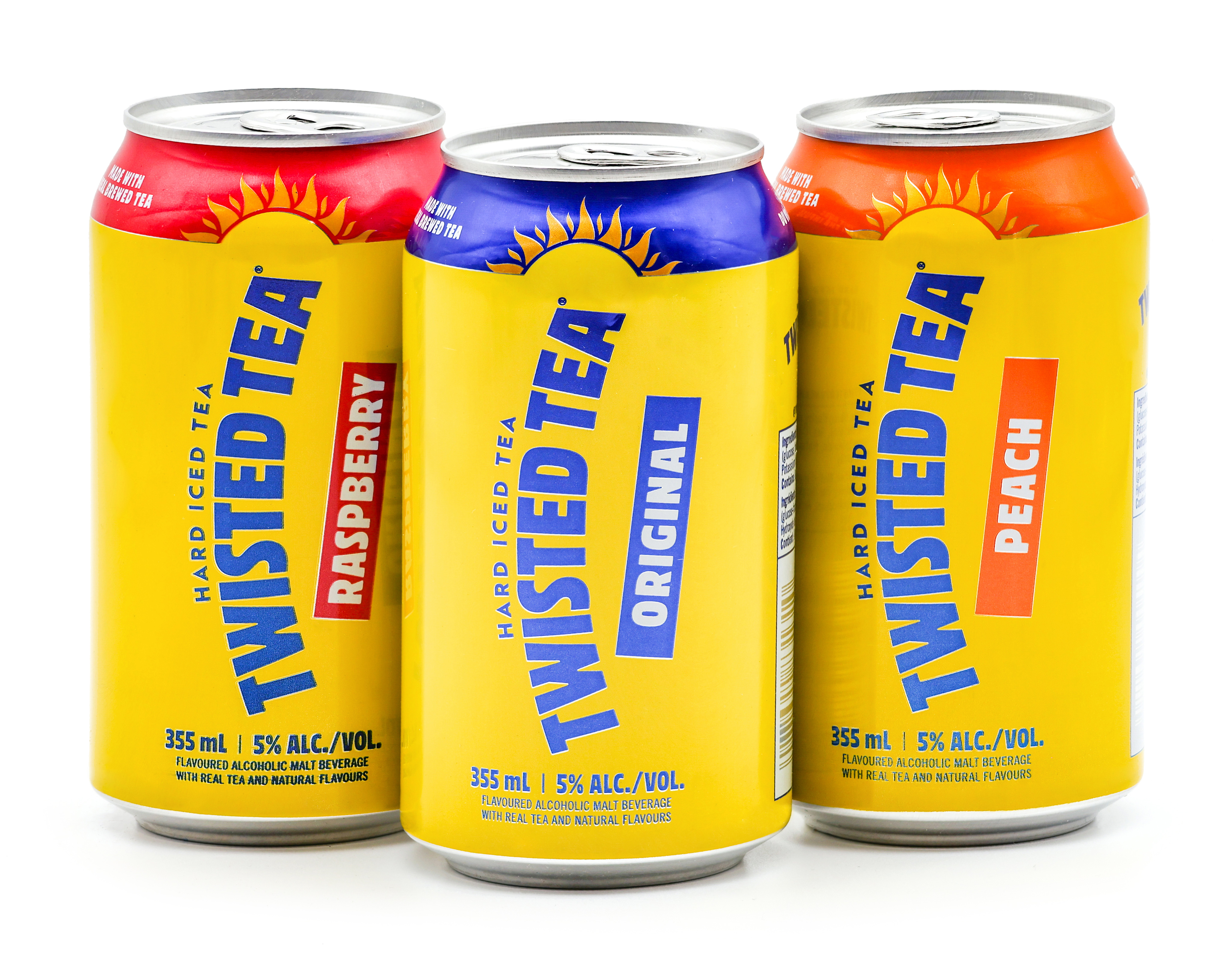
Three flavors of Twisted Tea: Raspberry, Original, and Peach

Beginning in 2001, Boston Beer began to produce Twisted Tea, a 5% abv malt beverage marketed as a "hard iced tea". Its brand portfolio has since grown to include a number of flavored varieties, including a "half and half" variant designed to mimic an Arnold Palmer, and is primarily marketed in the American southeast as well as the Canadian province of Alberta.

Hard seltzer

Truly is a brand of hard seltzer and vodka produced by the Boston Beer Company introduced in 2016.

Subsidiaries

Boston Beer operates a number of other sub-brands, including The Traveler Brewing Company (which focuses on shandy variants), Coney Island Brewing Company (purchased from Schmaltz Brewery and brewing a nationally available line of hard sodas in addition to beer exclusive to the New York City market), and also owns the Los Angeles-based Angel City Brewery and the Concrete Beach Brewery in Miami.

== Weihenstephan partnership ==
In October 2009, the Boston Beer Company announced a two-year project with German brewery Bayerische Staatsbrauerei Weihenstephan to jointly produce a new craft beer named Infinium, to be marketed in both Germany and the U.S. The brewers described the beer, which was sold in corked bottles and had alcohol content of 10.3% abv, as a Champagne-like "crisp pale brew". Approximately 15,000 cases were released in North America in December 2010 at a suggested retail price of $20 per 750 mL bottle, Marketed towards drinkers who would rather toast with beer than Champagne on New Year's Eve, Infinium is described by the brewers as "the first new beer style created under the Reinheitsgebot in over a hundred years". This contract ended in 2011.

== Philanthropy ==
=== Samuel Adams Brewing the American Dream ===
In 2008, Jim Koch created the Brewing the American Dream program. As of 2015, the company had helped more than 4,000 entrepreneurs and together with their lending partner, Accion, made close to 400 loans totaling $400 million.

=== 2008 Hops shortage ===
In early 2008, amidst a worldwide shortage of hops—a key ingredient in beer—Boston Beer Company agreed to sell 20,000 pounds of its hops, at cost, to craft brewers throughout the United States. The company selected 108 craft brewers to divide the 20,000 pounds they had spare.

Samuel Adams shared their hops again in June 2012.

=== LongShot American Homebrew Competition ===
Created in 1996, the Samuel Adams LongShot American Homebrew Competition is an annual competition among amateur homebrewers. Homebrewers submit their brew to a series of judging and taste tests with the chance to see their creation in larger-scale production and sold on store shelves as part of a Samuel Adams mixed 6-pack the following year.

== Sponsorship ==
Starting in the 2018 season, Boston Beer Company's Samuel Adams became the official beer of the Boston Red Sox, replacing Budweiser. The eight-year deal will last through the 2025 season and include signage and a Sam roof deck. The agreement also allows Boston Beer to use the Red Sox Logo for marketing purposes, run Red Sox related contests with tickets to games.

Since the 2021 season, Twisted Tea has been the naming sponsor of Team Twisted Tea Suzuki in the AMA Motocross and Supercross championships.

== Works cited ==
- Koch, James (2016). Quench Your Own Thirst: Business Lessons Learned Over a Beer or Two. New York: Flatiron Books. ISBN 978-1-250-07050-0. LCCN 2015046334.
