= List of breweries in Tennessee =

This is a list of active and former breweries in Tennessee.

== Active breweries ==
=== Chattanooga area ===
- Tanasi Brewing & Supplies – Chattanooga
- Chattanooga Brewing Company – Chattanooga
- Five Wits Brewing Company - Chattanooga
- Hutton & Smith Brewing Company – Chattanooga
- Mad Knight Brewing Company – Chattanooga
- Monkey Town Brewing Company - Chattanooga
- OddStory Brewing Company – Chattanooga
- Empyreal Brewing - Chattanooga
- Dynamo Brewing - Chattanooga
- TailGate Brewery - Chattanooga
- Wanderlinger Brewing Company - Chattanooga
- Cherry Street Brewpub - Chattanooga

=== Clarksville area ===
- Blackhorse Pub & Brewery - Clarksville
- Old Abe’s Brew House - Clarksville
- Strawberry Alley Ale Works - Clarksville
- The Fallen Brewery - Clarksville 2/19/2022 - 11/1/2025
- The Star Spangled Brewing Co - Clarksville

=== Cookeville area ===
- Hix Farm Brewery – Cookeville closed
- Jig Head Brewing Company – Cookeville closed
- Red Silo Brewing Company – Cookeville

=== Knoxville area ===
- Alliance Brewing Company – Knoxville
- Balter Beerworks – Knoxville
- Blackhorse Pub & Brewery - Knoxville
- Chisholm Tavern Brewery – Knoxville
- Clinch River Brewing – Knoxville, Norris
- Crafty Bastard Brewing – Knoxville
- Elst Brewing Company – Knoxville
- Fanatic Brewing – Knoxville
- Geezers Brewery – Knoxville
- Hexagon Brewing Company – Knoxville
- Last Days of Autumn Brewery – Knoxville
- Pretentious Beer Company – Knoxville
- Printshop Beer Company – Knoxville
- Schulz Bräu Brewing – Knoxville
- Smoky Mountain Brewery – Knoxville
- Woodruff Brewing Company – Knoxville

=== Memphis area ===
- Bosco's Restaurant and Brewing Company – Memphis
- Crosstown Brewing Company – Memphis
- Ghost River Brewing – Memphis
- High Cotton Brewing Company– Memphis
- Memphis Made Brewing Company – Memphis
- Rock’n Dough Pizza & Brew Company Company – Memphis
- Soul and Spirit Brewing Company
- Wiseacre Brewing Company [also purchased and brews the Bearded Iris brand] – Memphis

=== Murfreesboro area ===
- Cedar Glade Brews – Murfreesboro
- Middle Ground Brewing Co – Murfreesboro

=== Nashville area ===
- Barrique Brewing & Blending - Nashville
- Bassline Brewing Co - Nashville
- Black Abbey Brewing Company – Nashville
- Blackstone Brewing Company- Nashville
- Broadcast Brewing – Nashville [soft opening 4/13/2024]
- Crazy Gnome Brewery – Nashville [moved/opened in new location 4/26/2025]
- East Nashville Beer Works – Nashville
- Fait La Force Brewing - Nashville
- Fat Bottom Brewing Company – Nashville
- Jackalope Brewing Company – Nashville [acquired 10/9/2024 by Tacoma and Hoyt LLC investment firm]
- Living Waters Brewing Company - Nashville
- Marble Fox Brewing Company – Nashville
- New Heights Brewing Company – Nashville
- Smith & Lentz Brewing – Nashville
- Southern Grist Brewing Company – Nashville [to be taken over by XUL Beer Company by year end]
- Stoke Haus Brewing & Barbecue - Nashville [opened 8/6/2025, in former Crazy Gnome location]
- TailGate Brewing – Nashville
- Tennessee Brew Works – Nashville
- Tennfold Brewing – Donelson

=== Tri-Cities area (Bristol/Johnson City/Kingsport) ===
- Bristol Station Brews & Taproom – Bristol, VA
- Elder Brew – Bristol, TN
- Great Oak Brewing – Johnson City
- Gypsy Circus Cider Company – Kingsport
- Holston River Brewing Company – Bristol, TN
- Johnson City Brewing Company – Johnson City
- JRH Brewing – Johnson City
- Little Animals Brewery – Johnson City
- State Street Brewing – Bristol, VA
- Watauga Brewing Company - Johnson City
- Yee-Haw Brewing Company – Johnson City

=== East Tennessee ===
- Bankwalker Brewing Co - Pikeville
- Clinch River Brewing – Norris, Knoxville
- Creekside Brewing Company - Crossville
- Depot Street Brewing – Jonesborough
- Lilly Pad Hopyard Brewery – Lancing
- MoCo Brewing Project - Wartburg
- Monkey Town Brewing Company – Dayton, Loudon
- Peaceful Side Brewery - Maryville
- Round 6 Brewing – Maryville
- Sawbriar Brewing - Jamestown
- Sequatchie Valley Brewing Company - Dunlap
- Smoky Mountain Brewery – Gatlinburg, Maryville, Oak Ridge, Pigeon Forge, Sevierville, Knoxville
- Swing On Brewing Company - Crossville
- Tri-Hop Brewery – Maryville

=== Middle Tennessee ===
- Bad Idea Brewing - Columbia
- BS Brew Works - Springfield
- Calfkiller Brewing Company - Sparta
- Cedar City Brewing Company - Lebanon
- Common Law Brewing Co - Spring Hill
- Common John Brewing Co - Manchester
- Curio Brewing Company - Franklin
- Flytes Brewhouse - Pleasant View
- Half Batch Brewing Company – Hendersonville
- Happy Trails Brewing Co. – Sparta
- Granite City Food & Brewery - Franklin
- Mill Creek Brewing Company – Nolensville [Closed 11/11/2019. Reopened under new ownership 5/15/2020]
- Ole Shed Brewing Company – Tullahoma
- One19 Craft Kitchen & Brewery (beer branded Furnace Brewing) - Dickson
- Tenn Lakes Brewing Company - Lebanon
- Twisted Copper Brewing Company - Mt Pleasant
- Yazoo Brewing Company – Madison

=== West Tennessee ===
- Meddlesome Brewing Company – Cordova
- Hub City Brewing – Jackson
- Reelfoot Brewing Company - Trimble

== Former breweries ==
- Nashville Brewing Company - Nashville 1859-1890
- Tennessee Brewery - Memphis 1887-1954
- Big River Grille & Brewing Works - Nashville 1996-2013
- Boscos Restaurant & Brewing Co - Nashville 1994-2014
- O'Possum's Irish Pub - Murfreesboro 2012 - 3/27/2017
- Green Dragon Pub and Brewery - Murfreesboro 9/23/2017 (brewery) - 7/13/2019
- Mantra Artisan Ales - Franklin 11/13/2015 - 9/1/2019 [former location of Turtle Anarchy Brewing Co.]
- Mill Creek Brewing Company (experimental and specialty brewing only) - Franklin 9/18/2019 - 11/11/2019 [former location of Mantra Artisan Ales]
- Steel Barrel Brewery / Mantra Artisan Ales / Humulus Project (parent company Life is Brewing) at Hop Springs Beer Park – Murfreesboro 12/20/2018 (Mantra 9/1/2019) - 03/2020
- Depot Bottom Brewery - McMinnville 2018-2020
- Rock Bottom Restaurant & Brewery – Nashville 2013-2021
- Various Artists Brewing – Nashville 2018-2021
- Cool Springs Brewery – Franklin 10/2009 - 1/11/2022
- Terminal Brewhouse – Chattanooga 2009 - 4/21/2022
- Furnace Brewing - Dickson 9/1/2019 - 6/21/2022 [New owners 12/2021. 6/21/2022 name changed to One19 Craft Kitchen & Brewery (beer still named Furnace)]
- Honky Tonk Brewing Company – Nashville 10/2014 (taproom 1/2015) - 7/2/2022
- Gladiator Brewing Co. - Clarksville opened 2018(?) (closed 9/2019, reopened in new location w/ taproom(?) 8/7/2020) - 9/11/2022
- Perrylodgic Brewing Company – Paris 4/2015 - 12/7/2022
- Tennessee Valley Brewing Company - Clarksville 7/14/2017 - 10/14/2023 [reopened with new owner as Old Abe’s Brew House 12/31/2023]
- Huckleberry Brewing Co – Franklin 4/2022 - 9/2023
- Bold Patriot Brewing Company - Nashville 5/30/2020 - 9/2023
- Kings Bluff Brewery - Clarksville 2/2/2019 - 9/2/2023
- Big River Grille & Brewing Works – Chattanooga 9/1993 - 10/29/2023
- Marrowbone Creek Brewing Co - Ashland City 11/2020 - 11/18/2023
- Harding House Brewing Company – Nashville 10/20/2018 - 3/2/2024
- Big Trouble Brewing Company - Gallatin 8/16/2021 - 8/3/2024
- Asgard Brewing Company – Columbia 10/1/2016 - 8/16/2024
- Panther Creek Brews - Murfreesboro 6/20/2020 - 10/5/2024
- Mayday Brewery – Murfreesboro 11/30/2012 - 11/16/2024
- Czann's Brewing Company – Nashville 03/2013 (production) / 6/19/2014 (taproom) - 11/24/2024
- Hi-Wire Brewing – Nashville 8/18/2023 - 12/29/2024
- Naked River Brewing Company – Chattanooga 11/5/2018 - 7/22/2025
- Bearded Iris Brewing Company – Nashville 2/7/2016 - ~8/1/2025 [see Wiseacre Brewing Company]

== See also ==
- Beer in the United States
- List of breweries in the United States
- List of microbreweries
