= Gösser =

Brand of beer

Coordinates: 47°21′44″N 15°05′41″E

Göss Brewery
- Location: Leoben, Styria, Austria
- Opened: 1860
- Owned by: Brau Union
- Parent: Heineken International
- Website: goesser.at

Gösser (German pronunciation: [ˈɡœsɐ]) beer is the main brand of Göss Brewery in Leoben, one of the largest and most-well known in Austria. The brewery is part of Brau Union, the largest Austrian brewer, whose majority shareholder is the Dutch brewing company Heineken.

== History ==
Back in the Middle Ages, beer brewing was common at Göss Abbey in Styria, where a first brewmaster was documented in a 1459 deed. After the monastery's dissolution in the course of the Josephinist reforms, the tradition was resumed in 1860, when 28-year-old Max Kober, who had been a master brewer with Żywiec (Saybusch) Brewery in Galicia (present-day Poland), purchased the premises and re-established the brewery.

Göss quickly became the largest brewery in Upper Styria and by 1892 was producing ca. 60,000 barrels per year. In the 1920s the brewery began selling pasteurized beer in crown corked glass bottles permitting Gösser to market their beer outside of Austria. By 1930 the company was producing ca 340,000 barrels per year and had exceeded 850,000 barrels per year by 1973.

In 1977 Gösser joined the Steirerbrau group, which merged into rivalling Brau-Beteiligungs-AG (BBAG) in 1991. From 1993 both companies operated under Brau Union Austria. In 2003, Gösser with Brau Union was taken over by Heineken International Zoeterwoude.

== Beers produced ==
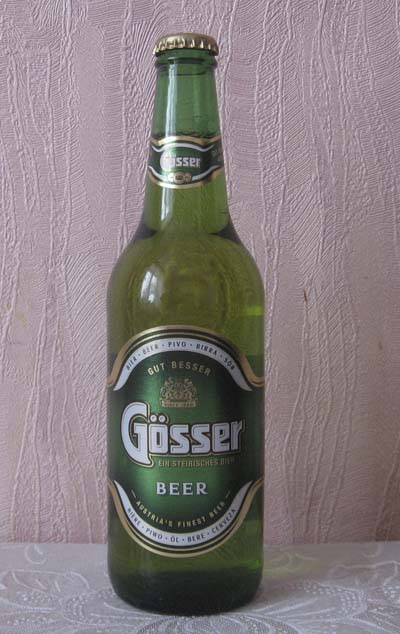
A bottle of Gösser beer

- Märzen
- Gold
- Spezial
- Stiftsbräu
- Bock
- Zwickl
- Dunkles Zwickl
- Naturradler
- Kräuterradler
- Naturgold (Alcohol Free)
- Gösser Kracherl (Alcohol Free)

The Spezial is proudly noted by the company as having been served at the gala dinner at the signing of the 1955 Austrian State Treaty.

== Slogan ==
Since the 1960s the brand's slogan has remained the same -- Gut. Besser. Gösser. (Good. Better. Gösser.)
