= 1910 Kentucky Derby =

Horse race

36th Kentucky Derby
- Kentucky Derby
- Grade I stakes race
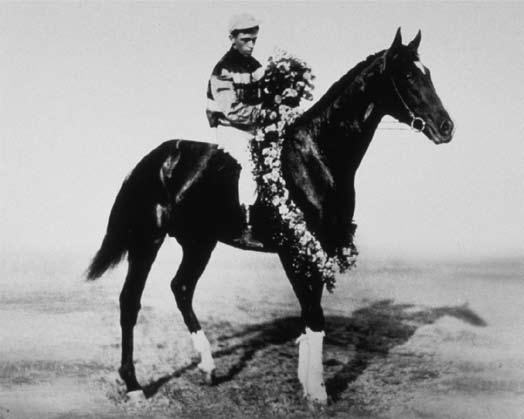
- 1910 Kentucky Derby winner Donau
- Location: Churchill Downs
- Date: May 10, 1910
- Winning horse: Donau
- Jockey: Frederick Herbert
- Trainer: George Ham
- Owner: William Gerst Sr.
- Surface: Dirt

The 1910 Kentucky Derby was the 36th running of the Kentucky Derby. The race took place on May 10, 1910, held at Churchill Downs racecourse in Louisville, Kentucky and was the first year in which the race times were counted in fifths of a second instead of quarters of a second in hopes of having a more accurate race duration time of the horses. The winning horse's name is Donau who was jockeyed by Frederick Herbert. Donau was awarded $4,850, second place horse (Joe Morris) received $700, and third place horse (Fighting Bob) received $300.

== Final results ==
Finished	Post	Horse	Jockey	Trainer	Owner	Time / behind
1st	7	Donau	Frederick Herbert	George Ham	William Gerst Sr.	2:06.40
2nd	1	Joe Morris	Vincent Powers	Auval John Baker	Robert H. Anderson	1/2
3rd	4	Fighting Bob	Stanley B. Page	James Gass	George Reif	Head
4th	3	Boola Boola	Ted Rice	J. Oliver Baker	Johnson N. Camden Jr.	Nose
5th	5	Topland	Dale Austin	Charles C. Van Meter	Charles C. Van Meter	15
6th	2	John Furlong	Richard Scoville	Walter Grater	J. C. Rogers	2
7th	6	Gallant Pirate	Bert Kennedy	Fred Luzader	J. R. Wainwright	8

- Winning Breeder: Milton Young; (KY)
- Horse Eye White was scratched before the race.

== Donau history ==
Donau, the 1910 Kentucky Derby winner, was jockeyed by Frederick Herbert, bred by Col. Milton Young, owned by William Gerst Sr. and trained by George Ham. Donau was breeder, Col. Milton Young's, second Derby winning horse following the 1887 winning horse named Montrose. Donau was purchased at one year old for $350 and sent off to Gerst's Vinehill stables for race preparations. In his second year of racing, Donau placed in the top three thirty five out of forty one races. Once he matured enough for Derby eligibility, he was entered at 3 years old in 1910, ultimately winning the 1910 Kentucky Derby.

== 1910 Derby day ==
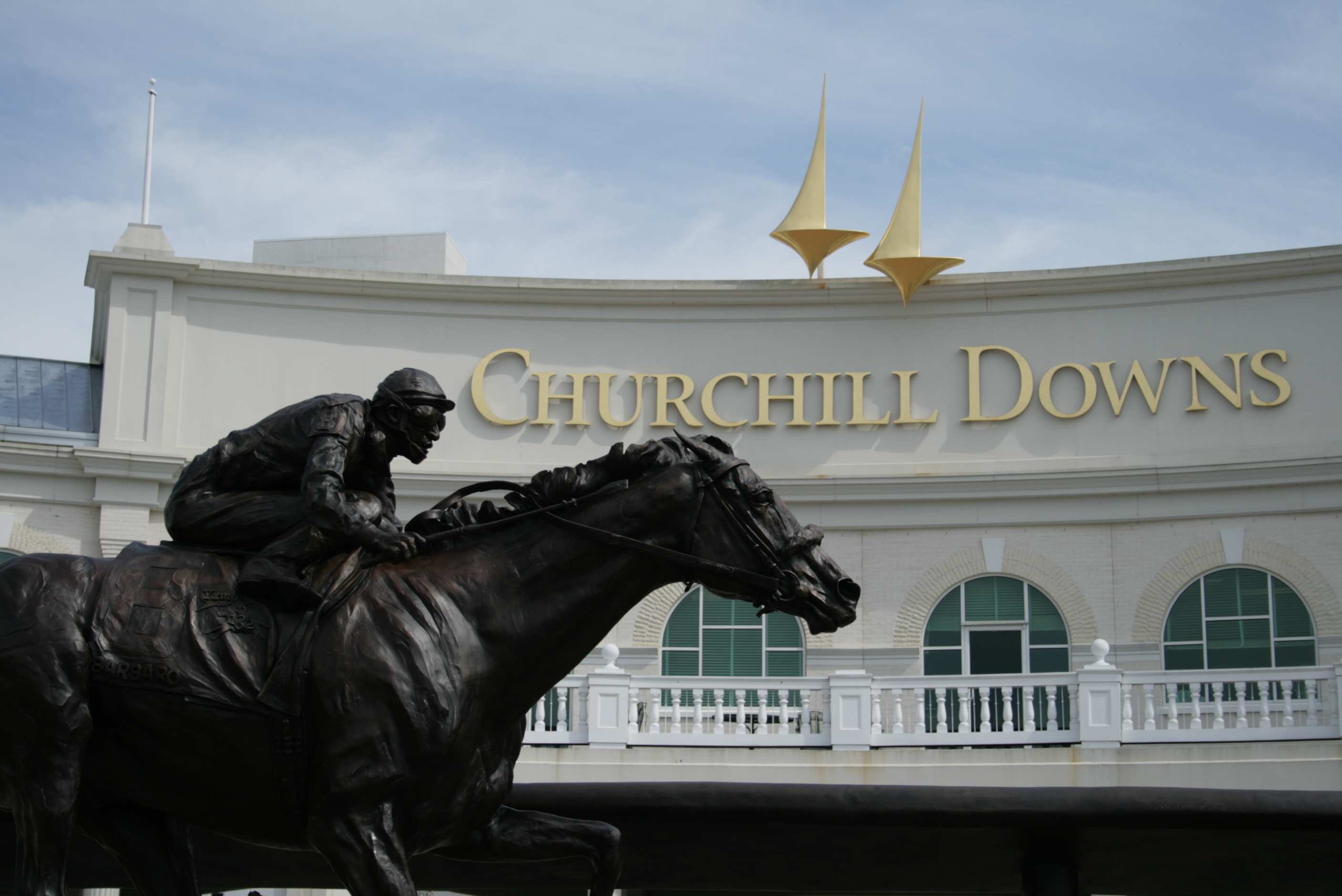
Churchill Downs racecourse in Louisville, Kentucky, United States.

The track is about 1.25 miles in length and usually averages about 2 minutes in length, hence the nickname "the greatest two minutes in sports". The order in which the horses arrived to the starting gate were as follows: Joe Morris, Donau, Boola Boola, Gallant Pirate, Fighting Bob, John Furlong, and Topland. After the race had begun and the horses were nearing the end of one quarter of a mile, Donau was already in the lead closely followed by Joe Morris and Topland. By the three-quarter of a mile mark, Donau continued to lead the race whilst Joe Morris and Topland were now separated by nearly four feet. Towards the one mile mark, Donau was still ahead, but not by much, with Joe Morris and Fighting Bob on his tail. Over the last quarter of a mile and into the home stretch, Donau was able to hold onto his lead followed by Joe Morris and Fighting Bob who took second and third place respectively.

== Payout ==
Post	Horse	Win	Place	Show
7	Donau	$13.25	7.50	7.50
1	Joe Morris		7.50	7.50
4	Fighting Bob			8.50

- The winner received a purse of $4,850.
- Second place received $700.
- Third place received $300.
