= Bavaria Brewery =

Bavaria brewery may refer to:

- Bavaria Brewery (Colombia), now a division of AB InBev
- Bavaria Brewery (Netherlands), now part of Royal Swinkels
- Bavarian Brewing Company, in Kentucky, United States, closed 1966
- Bavaria – St. Pauli Brewery (Bavaria- und St. Pauli-Brauerei), now part of Holsten
