= Gerst Brewing Company =

American beer brewing company

William Gerst Brewing Company
- Industry: Alcoholic beverage
- Founded: 1890-1954
- Headquarters: South High Street (6th Ave. South); Nashville, Tennessee; United States
- Products: German-American beers
- Owner: William Gerst

The William Gerst Brewing Company was a beer-maker located in Nashville, Tennessee. Originally named the Nashville Brewing Company, which opened in 1859, the operation was purchased in 1890 and operated as the William Gerst Brewing Company. The Nashville Brewing Company was occasionally renamed, with other company names including the Nashville Brewery, Stifel & Pfeiffer Brewery, South Nashville Lager Beer Brewery, and Moerlein-Gerst Brewing Company. I 1893 it became the William Gerst Brewing Company, in a facility completely rebuilt on the same property, which remained in operation until the company closed in 1954.

After the brewery closed, a German restaurant called the Gerst Haus was started by Gerst's grandson and operated in several locations from 1955 until 2018. Although the brewery has been closed for decades, Gerst Amber has been contract brewed by several different breweries since the 1990s.

== History ==
=== Foundation as Nashville Brewing Company (1859–1892) ===
The city of Nashville, Tennessee was designated to be the capital of the state in 1843. This prompted a population boom, including a number of German immigrants who came to the area in the 1850s with a cultural preference for beer drinking, contributing to the growth of a market for beer that was more freshly brewed than the product that could typically be imported from other states. Among these immigrants was Jacob Stifel, who in 1859 opened a small brewery, which would eventually become the Nashville Brewing Company, and which was "the first production brewery in Nashville". The company's facilities were initially located on South High Street, which later became Sixth Avenue South.

Production was interrupted during the American Civil War, but the company resumed operations in 1864, with Stifel taking on Louis Pfeiffer as a business partner, and the brewery being renamed the South Nashville Brewery, as there was also a small brewery in North Nashville (Germantown) called the North Nashville Brewery. An 1873 news article referred to the brewery as a "mammoth establishment", being "of proportions much larger than one would suppose who had not visited it".

Pfeiffer died suddenly in April 1876, and the company was then sold in an auction. The purchaser was J.B. Kuhn, who took over its operations and changed the name to South Nashville Ale and Lager Beer Brewery. In 1878, Kuhn sold the company to C.A. Maus and Brothers, who in 1880 sold it to John Burkhardt. Burkhardt then changed the name to the Nashville Brewing Company. During one period in 1880, the company advertised an offer to pay $100 "to any person who can produce a better and purer quality of beer than we are now manufacturing in our brewery". In 1882, Burkhardt entered into a partnership with two Scottish brothers from Cincinnati, William and Archibald Walker. The brothers bought complete control of the company from Burkhardt in 1885, but Archibald Walker died in 1889, prompting surviving brother William to convey ownership of the company again in 1890.

=== Ownership by Moerlein Brewing (1890-1892) ===
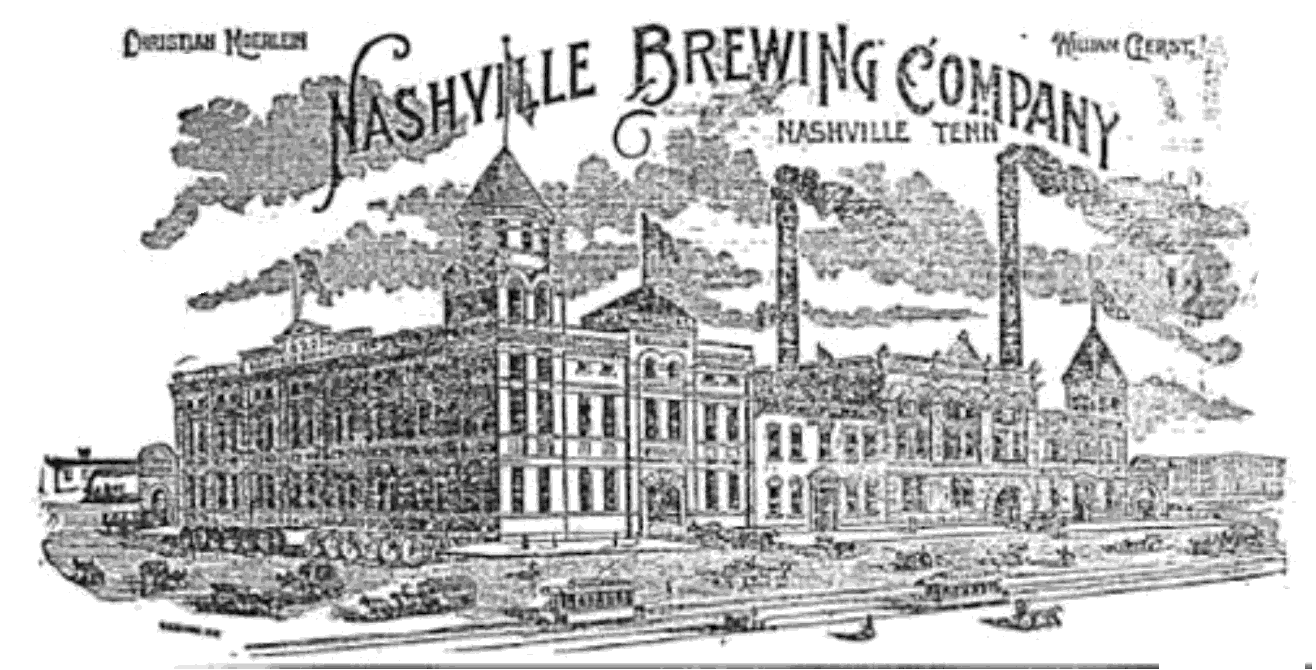
Illustration of the Nashville Brewing Company from an 1891 advertisement, after it had been rebuilt by Moerlein-Gerst in 1890

In 1890, the business and the property were purchased by Christian Moerlein of Cincinnati, proprietor of the famous Christian Moerlein Brewing Co., and his apprentice William Gerst. The existing facility was razed, and Moerlein and Gerst initially planned to invest "between $250,000 and $500,000 into the Nashville Brewing Company", by their own account to "erect the finest and largest brewery in the whole Southern Country" on the property.

=== Operations as Gerst Brewing (1893–1919) ===
In 1893, Gerst, who had moved to Nashville while Moerlein remained in Cincinnati, "assumed sole operations", changing the name of the company to the William Gerst Brewing Company. The brewery continued its success in Nashville and won the Gold Award at the Tennessee Centennial Exposition of 1897. By the turn of the century, the brewery was considered one of the largest in the South.

William Gerst was viewed as a prominent citizen of Nashville and got into race horses as a hobby. In 1910, his horse Donau was the Kentucky Derby. On April 1, 2022 (William Gerst's 175th birthday) the Metro Nashville Historical Commission installed a Historical Marker at Vine Hill to memorialize Donau. The marker was sponsored by Scott Mertie, Nashville brewery historian and owner of the Nashville Brewing Company.

=== Prohibition (1919–1933) ===
Unfortunately, the Temperance Movement was strong in Tennessee and the brewery was forced to market lower alcohol beers. By 1913, the state went dry, six years before National Prohibition. William Gerst retired and moved back to Cincinnati, where his wife's family lived. Gerst's four sons continued operations by making non-alcoholic malt beverages and other sodas, such as Orange Crush under the name the Gerst Bottling Works.

William Gerst died on March 10, 1933, shortly before the end of Prohibition. He is buried at the Spring Grove Cemetery in Cincinnati.

=== Post-Prohibition (1933–1954) ===
After the repeal of Prohibition in 1933, the William Gerst Brewing Company started brewing beer again. In 1940, the brewery had a large 50 year anniversary (1890-1940) marketing campaign featuring a large "Gay 90's" parade through Nashville. However, the brewery would never see the success it had prior to prohibition. Due to national advertising budgets of larger breweries, the William Gerst Brewing Company closed in 1954.

=== The Gerst Haus restaurants (1955–2018) ===
in 1955, a year after the closing of the brewery, William Gerst's grandson, William J. (Bill) Gerst bought the M&A Café in downtown Nashville. The restaurant, which its name changed to the Gerst House, was located at 315 Second Ave North, near the Courthouse. It was a popular lunchtime spot for lawyers and politicians, serving deli-style sandwiches and oyster rolls. William J. Gerst died November 12, 1968, leaving the restaurant to his daughter, Gene Gerst Ritter (great-granddaughter of William Gerst) and her husband Eugene Ritter. The couple was known as Gene and Gene.

In 1970, the Ritters moved the restaurant across the Cumberland River to 228 Woodland Street. By this time it was known as the Gerst Haus, serving traditional German food in addition to its regular menu. The Gerst Haus was decorated with original lithographs and other advertising pieces from the William Gerst Brewing Company. The restaurant continued to be a favorite among Nashvillians with beer served in "fishbowls" and German oompah and polka entertainment on the weekends.

In 1988, ownership of the Gerst Haus was sold to brothers Jim and Jerry Chandler. The Chandlers owned several other restaurants in the Nashville area including the Sportsman's Grille. The Chandlers operated the Gerst Haus in Nashville until the football stadium was constructed for the Tennessee Titans. At that time in 1999, the Chandlers opened the Gerst Bavarian Haus in Evansville, Indiana, where they were having their Gerst Amber contracted brewed. Mary Hance of the Tennessean says that Gerst House was best known "for was its fishbowls of beer and the German food — Bratwurst, Bavarian pizza, kielbasa and pumpernickel bread, Reuben sandwiches, oyster rolls, and pig knuckles." There were beer boys serving beer while waitresses served food orders.

The Gerst Haus reopened in August 2000 in its third location, 301 Woodland Street, across from the new Tennessee Titan's stadium. The Gerst Haus would operate in this location until March 2018, when it permanently closed due to slow sales. The Evansville Gerst Bavarian Haus continues to operate.

=== Gerst Amber Beer (1992–present) ===
In the early 1990s, the Chandler brothers, who owned the Gerst Haus at the time, contracted with the Evansville Brewing Company to brew Gerst Haus Premium Amber to be sold at the restaurant. This was an amber lager loosely based on Gerst Old Amber Premium Beer that was originally released in 1950. Due to the success of the beer sales at the Gerst Haus, the Chandlers decided to have the beer bottled for retail sale in 1992 and marketed it as Gerst Amber for sales in Nashville TN and Evansville IN.

The Evansville Brewing Company eventually closed and their brands were sold to the Iron City Brewing Company (aka Pittsburgh Brewing Co). The Chandlers contracted with the Pittsburg Brewing Company to continue brewing Gerst Amber. The beer was only available on draft at the Gerst Haus and other restaurants operated by the Chandler brothers in Nashville and Evansville. Eventually the Pittsburg Brewing Co declared bankruptcy and production of Gerst Amber once again ceased.

In 2011, the Chandlers contracted with Yazoo Brewing Company to bring Gerst back to Nashville. Gerst Amber Ale was developed and brewed by Yazoo to be sold in bottles and draft in the Nashville market. Being an ale, the beer has its differences from the original Amber lager brewed by Gerst, as well as the ones brewed by the Evansville and Pittsburg Brewing Companies. The current label design is based on an original pre-prohibition label that was used by Gerst in the early 1900s.

=== Cultural impact and research ===
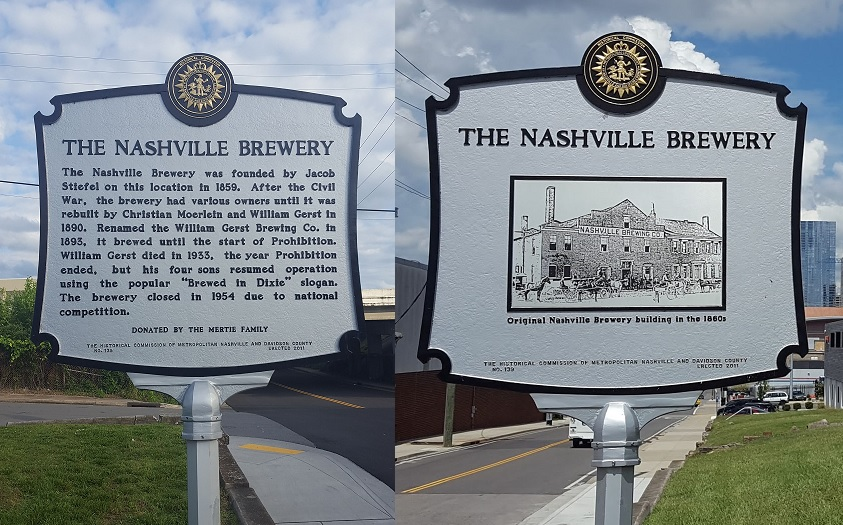
The front and back of the Nashville Brewery Historical Marker located in Nashville, Tennessee

In 2006, local businessman and historian Scott R. Mertie (owner of the Nashville Brewing Company) wrote a book on Nashville's brewing history, titled Nashville Brewing (Arcadia Publishing, 2006). The book spanned from the early 19th century to the modern day micro-breweries in Nashville, but the majority of the book was about the life of William Gerst and his brewery. In 2011, Mertie coordinated with the Metro-Nashville Historical Commission to erect a Historical Marker where the Nashville Brewing Company/Gerst Brewing Company once operated.

In May 2019, Mertie and Vanderbilt University anthropology professor John Janusek used ground-penetrating radar to map the area beneath downtown Nashville's 6th Avenue South, in an attempt to locate tunnels and cellars thought to have been used by the original Nashville Brewing Company, and its successor, the William Gerst Brewing Company. The results of that search will determine whether the Vanderbilt University anthropology department will begin an archaeological excavation.
