= Donau (horse) =

American-bred Thoroughbred racehorse

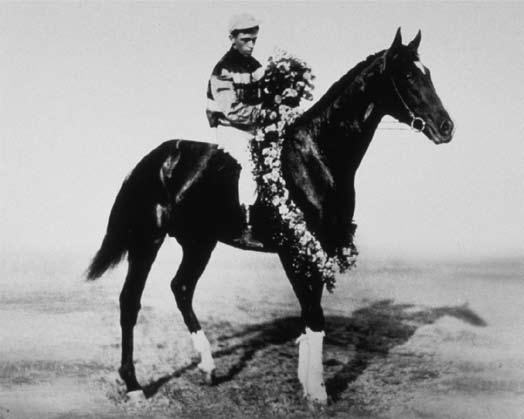
- 1910 Kentucky Derby winner Donau
- Sire: Woolsthorpe
- Grandsire: Tibthorpe
- Dam: Al Lone
- Damsire: Albert
- Sex: Stallion, eventually Gelding
- Foaled: 1907
- Country: United States
- Colour: Bay
- Breeder: Col. Milton Young
- Owner: 1) Col. Milton Young; 2) William Gerst
- Trainer: 1) James Blute; 2) George Ham
- Record: 111: 30-18-30
- Earnings: $20,156

Major wins
- Wakefield Stakes (1909); Camden Handicap (1910); South Carolina Selling Stakes (1912) American Classics wins: Kentucky Derby (1910)

Donau (1907–1913) was an American Thoroughbred racehorse and was the winner of the 1910 Kentucky Derby. Donau was known for his often temperamental and difficult personality, which led to him being gelded at the end of 1910. Donau started in 111 races over his three-year flat racing career and was in the process of being retrained for steeplechasing when he died at the age of six years in February 1913 at the Nashville farm of his owner William Gerst of the William Gerst Brewing Company.

== Background ==
=== Origins and parentage ===
Donau was bred by Colonel Milton Young, who owned Donau's sire. At the time of Donau's birth, Col. Young and Thomas Piatt had a racing partnership. Piatt owned Brookdale Farm in Kentucky, a Thoroughbred stud farm located on Greendale Pike approximately seven miles northwest of Lexington, where Donau was foaled in 1907.

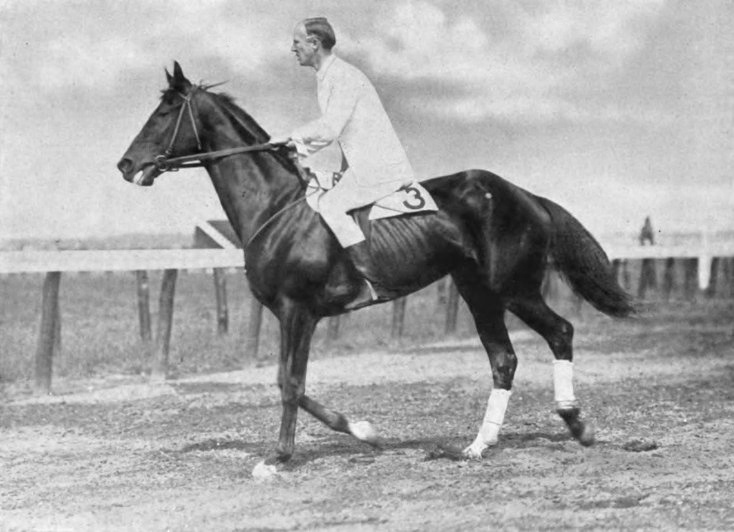
Donau's full-brother Wooltex being ridden by his owner George S. Patton in 1914.

Donau's sire Woolsthorpe was imported from Britain by Col. Young and his racing partner Charles F. McMeekin (or according to another source Eugene Leigh) in the summer of 1900. Woolsthorpe raced for 10 seasons, from 1890 to 1899 in Britain, winning nine races out of 63 starts for his breeder Prince Peter Soltykoff. Woolsthorpe was the sire of over 200 racing winners before his death at the age of 22 at the Lexington farm of John D. Carr on July 15, 1910, about a month after Donau won the Kentucky Derby.

Donau's dam, Al Lone, was bred by H. B. Douglas and was foaled in Fayetteville, Tennessee in 1894. Al Lone was a semi-successful selling-plater with sixteen minor racing wins to her credit in 128 starts that was purchased by Thomas Piatt after her racing career ended in 1903. Al Lone produced Donau's full-brother, Wooltex, in 1909 at Brookdale Farm. Wooltex was later gelded and was a successful steeplechaser in the 1910s. Wooltex was bought by George S. Patton for $2,100 in 1912 and from Patton's personal correspondence, the gelding had a nervous and flighty personality similar to his older brother Donau.

=== Personality and attributes ===
According to Thomas Piatt, Donau had a fiery temper as a yearling, repeatedly kicking any other colt that would come near him. Piatt typically reared his yearlings in group pens, but Donau's fractious behavior led Piatt to separate him from other horses. Piatt raised Donau at Brookdale Farm until September 1908, when he was sold to William Gerst for $350. Gerst emigrated to the United States from Germany as a child and was the co-founder of the Gerst Brewing Company in Nashville, Tennessee. William Gerst named the colt Donau after the Danube River.

William Gerst remarked on Donau's qualities and personality, "[he] has the speed of a sprinter, the courage of a bulldog, and the gameness of a fighting cock." Fred Herbert, Donau's jockey in the Derby, said of the often temperamental horse, "he likes to be in company and don't fret a bit when he comes on the track with another horse, while just alone he is a bit nervous."

== Racing career ==
=== 1909: two-year-old season ===
Donau spent much of his early racing career in California. Donau started 41 times as a two-year-old, which was considered excessive by many horsemen, even at a time when racehorses were normally raced hard at a very young age. Donau's first major stakes win was the 1909 Wakefield Stakes, run at the Empire City Race Track in Yonkers, where he also started in three other races over a period of eight days. After winning the Wakefield Stakes on July 22, trainer James Blute decided the colt needed to be rested. It was thought he would return for September's Flatbush Stakes which the Daily Racing Form said was a race which could determine that year's two-year-old champion. Donau did not compete and the race was won by Waldo who would receive 1909 Co-Championship honors with Sweep. Trainer James Blute would be replaced by the owners for the 1910 racing season.

=== 1910: three-year-old season ===
Ridden by Canadian-born jockey Fred Herbert, Donau won the 1910 Kentucky Derby in a close finish over Joe Morris at a time of 2:06 2/5 on a fast track, winning a total of $4,850 for Gerst. William Gerst had previously achieved a second-place finish in the 1907 Derby with his colt Zal and a third-place finish in the 1904 Derby with Brancas. Donau's trainer, George Ham, remarked on the colt's Derby win "The colt performed in a most remarkable manner and showed that he could go over a distance of ground, even though hard pressed by game opponents."

After the Derby win, Donau's unruly behavior worsened to a point where he would lie down on the track if prompted too harshly by racetrack employees or trainers. In September 1910, Gerst temporarily retired Donau to his farm in Nashville with commentary in the Daily Racing Form suggesting that the break from racing was due to Donau being a "track demon" with a "disposition to do nothing asked of him." Donau was gelded at the end of his three-year-old season in an attempt to curb his behavior, but he was still fractious. However, in March 1912 he won the South Carolina Selling Stakes at Palmetto Park in Charleston, South Carolina. Donau was retired from flat racing in December 1912, at age five.

== Retirement and death ==
Donau was in the process of being re-trained for steeplechasing when he died suddenly in February 1913 during an epidemic that killed three and sickened 18 other horses at the Nashville farm of William Gerst. On April 1, 2022 (William Gerst's 175th birthday) the Metro Nashville Historical Commission installed a Historical Marker at Vine Hill to memorialize Donau. The marker was sponsored by Scott Mertie, Nashville brewery historian and owner of the Nashville Brewing Company.

== Pedigree ==
Pedigree of Donau (US), Bay colt, 1907
Sire Woolsthorpe (GB) Bay, 1888	Tibthorpe; 1864	Voltigeur	Voltaire
Sire Woolsthorpe (GB) Bay, 1888	Tibthorpe; 1864	Voltigeur	Martha Lynn
Sire Woolsthorpe (GB) Bay, 1888	Tibthorpe; 1864	Little Agnes	The Cure
Sire Woolsthorpe (GB) Bay, 1888	Tibthorpe; 1864	Little Agnes	Miss Agnes
Sire Woolsthorpe (GB) Bay, 1888	Light of Other Days; 1882	Balfe	Plaudit^
Sire Woolsthorpe (GB) Bay, 1888	Light of Other Days; 1882	Balfe	Bohemia
Sire Woolsthorpe (GB) Bay, 1888	Light of Other Days; 1882	Meteor	Thunderbolt
Sire Woolsthorpe (GB) Bay, 1888	Light of Other Days; 1882	Meteor	Duty
Dam Al Lone Bay, 1894	Albert (GB); 1882	Albert Victor	Marsyas
Dam Al Lone Bay, 1894	Albert (GB); 1882	Albert Victor	Princess of Wales
Dam Al Lone Bay, 1894	Albert (GB); 1882	Hawthorn Bloom	Kettledrum
Dam Al Lone Bay, 1894	Albert (GB); 1882	Hawthorn Bloom	Lady Alice Hawthorn
Dam Al Lone Bay, 1894	Fronie Louise; 1883	Glengarry (GB)	Thormanby*^
Dam Al Lone Bay, 1894	Fronie Louise; 1883	Glengarry (GB)	Carbine
Dam Al Lone Bay, 1894	Fronie Louise; 1883	Rosa Clark	Australian
Dam Al Lone Bay, 1894	Fronie Louise; 1883	Rosa Clark	Kitty Clark

*^ Donau is inbred 5S x 4D to the stallion Thormanby, meaning that he appears fifth generation (via Plaudit)^ on the sire side of his pedigree and fourth generation on the dam side of his pedigree.
