= Lucky Saint =

Low-alcohol beer brand

- Type: Low-alcohol beer
- Manufacturer: Not Another Beer Co Ltd
- Origin: United Kingdom
- Introduced: October 2018; 7 years ago
- Alcohol by volume: 0.5%
- Style: Pale lager
- Variants: Hazy IPA, Lemon Lager, Weissbier
- Website: luckysaint.co

Lucky Saint is a brand of low-alcohol pale lager, launched in the United Kingdom in 2018 and produced in Germany by Not Another Beer Co Ltd.

== History ==
Lucky Saint was developed by Luke Boase in collaboration with an established brewery in the German state of Bavaria, after two years of collaborating with several breweries across Europe to develop a new low-alcohol beer. Unlike previous attempts, this beer was left unfiltered. Lucky Saint is brewed in Germany for the UK market, because UK law requires that if it were produced domestically it would have to contain no more than 0.05% alcohol in order to be labelled "alcohol-free", however this does not apply to products produced in the EU where the limit is only 0.5%.

The Lucky Saint brand was officially launched in the UK in October 2018. In January 2020, Lucky Saint launched on draught, and by January 2024 was available on tap in over 1,000 pubs across the UK. In December 2023, a "Hazy IPA" variety was introduced, also at 0.5%. In 2023, Lucky Saint opened a pub in Marylebone, London, providing customers with a range of low-alcohol and alcohol beer produced by Lucky Saint as well as competitor brands.

=== Name ===
The name "Lucky Saint" is an acknowledgement of the luck required to get the idea for the brand off the ground, and the saintly virtuousness of abstaining from alcohol. The brand's logo is a golden ladybird, a traditional symbol of good luck.

== Ownership ==
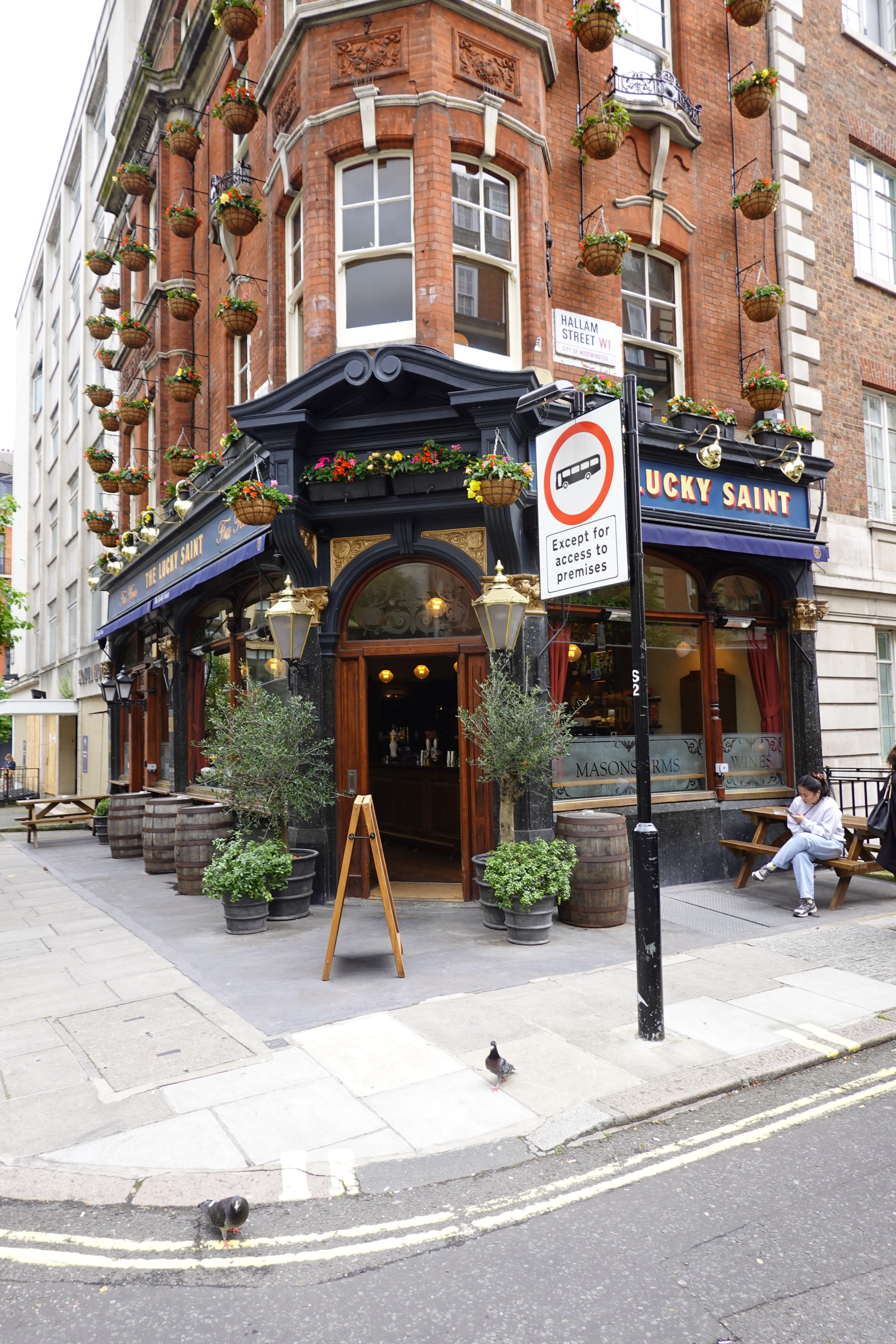
The Lucky Saint pub in Marylebone London.

The Lucky Saint is a brand of Not Another Beer Co Ltd, a private limited company incorporated in the UK in August 2017. Its founder Luke Boase continues in his role at the helm of the company. Not Another Beer Co Ltd is certified as a B Corporation, employing 53 people as of December 2023.

== Marketing campaigns ==
Lucky Saint has had a number of high visibility marketing campaigns targeted towards the growing market for zero-alcohol and low-alcohol beer. This includes being the official beer partner of the Dry January campaign, and a large public campaign of the Lucky Saint brand targeted at moderate drinkers in 2023-24.
