= Burger Brewing Company =

American brewery

- Interactive map of Burger Brewing Company
- Location: Cincinnati, Ohio, United States
- Coordinates: 39.1031°N 84.5120°W
- Opened: 1883
- Closed: 1973 (Purchased by Hudepohl)
- Key people: Charles Burger, Louis Burger, and W.J. Huster
- Owned by: Hudepohl-Schoenling Brewing Company
- Parent: Christian Moerlein Brewing Company

Active beers
Name	Type
Burger Classic	Lager
Burger Light	Light beer

The Burger Brewing Company was an American brewery based in Cincinnati, Ohio, and one of the staple breweries of the region through the 1960s. At the company's peak, it was deeply associated with the Cincinnati Reds and then-broadcaster Waite Hoyt through marketing campaigns. Burger Classic and Burger Light were brought back to local ownership in 2009 and are now owned by the Christian Moerlein Brewing Company.

== History ==
=== Early history ===
Brothers Charles and Louis Burger had been in the malting business in Cincinnati after immigrating from Germany. Opening their company, Burger Brothers Malting Company in 1880, it was family run for decades. Once Prohibition ended the company, now led by president W.J. Huster, felt it was time to directly enter the brewing business. In 1934, Burger began to occupy the former Lion Brewery on Central Parkway, which was originally owned and operated by the Windisch-Muhlhauser Brewery. The first beers the company produced were under the Burger and Buckeye brand names as well as a Red Lion Ale as a nod to its brewery's predecessor. After a legal battle with the Buckeye brand name, it was dropped as was Red Lion in favor of Burger's own ale. By 1942, fewer than ten years after the founding of the brewery, Burger produced 460,000 barrels and was the 28th largest brewery in the United States.

=== World War II ===
The war prevented the brewery from capitalizing on its success with expansion. The brewery also distanced itself from its German heritage in marketing due to anti-German hysteria. The brewery removed the umlaut from its name and removed a Germanic character from the label of its Burger Brau beer. The brewery was one of roughly forty brands that were permitted toaa (a Table of Allowance (TOA)) beer for shipment to military personnel.

=== Post-war growth ===
After World War II, the advent of television along with the use of radio in marketing presented challenges for Burger. The company now faced competition outside of the Cincinnati region from brands such as Schlitz, Pabst, and Anheuser-Busch. The brewery undertook a number of upgrades and expansions upon the facility to keep pace with others, doubling its capacity to one million barrels. The company also added a new 300,000 squarest bottling and shipping building nearby. This expansion was met with success as output by 1951 was 710,000 barrels sold, good enough for second largest in Cincinnati. Burger also was unique, in that the company brewed Munich's own Löwenbräu under contract after WWII.

During this time Burger became the sponsor of the Cincinnati Reds radio broadcasts. This lasted from 1942, when broadcaster and former major league pitcher Waite Hoyt was hired, until 1965. Many Reds fans became familiar with Hoyt exclaiming during a home run at Crosley Field that the ball was, "Headed for Burgerville!" Despite dealing with a lifelong battle with alcoholism, Hoyt was the most valuable part of Burger's marketing success. Broadcast on over 27 networks across Burger's core market, the "Burger Beer Network" as Hoyt referred to it, helped Burger keep its market position for years.

After enough time had past, the company began to return aspects of its German past to its products. The slogan, "Vas you ever in Zinzinnnati?" returned in the 1950s as the company began to stress Cincinnati's brewing heritage compared to Milwaukee and St. Louis. The old style bavarian character also returned to the Burger Brau brand.

In 1956, Burger purchased the Burkhart Brewing Company in Akron for $2 million. This expansion allowed Burger to grow its capacity and compete better in the Cleveland and Detroit markets. It also distinguished Burger as the only Cincinnati brewery to expand outside of the region. However, by 1964 it was no longer financially effective to maintain this additional brewery, and Burger closed the facility.

=== Hard-times and sale ===
By the mid-1960s competition from national rivals began to catch up to Burger. Increased marketing and distribution from other breweries forced Burger to spend more and more on marketing to stay relevant. Additionally, costly upgrades to equipment and facilities were necessary, which further harmed the profitability of the company. In 1965, the brewery added Bohemian Tap Beer, which proved to be popular. This was not enough and in a move to maintain profitability the company purchased four Pepsi-Cola bottling plants around the country.

The final mistake made by the company was changing its water source. In 1968, the brewery switched to using water from a well under the property from city water. Despite the spin to a beer made with, "artesian spring water" the change in taste proved to be unpopular with the public, with sales in Cincinnati dropping 14 percent. The company never rebounded and by 1973 its assets were sold to rival Hudepohl Brewing Company.

=== Under new management ===
Hudepohl bought the brands of Burger for $650,000 at the time of sale. The company introduced Burger Light in 1980 and when Hudepohl merged with Schoenling in 1986 much of the landscape of brewing had changed in Cincinnati and across the US. After Hudepohl-Schoenling sold its brewery to the Boston Beer Company in 1997, Burger continued to be brewed at the facility until 2001. From 2001 to 2004 Burger was brewed under contract in LaCrosse, Wisconsin by City Brewing Company. During this time, Burger was reformulated and renamed as Bürger Classic, returning the long since absent umlaut.

Eventually the Hudepohl-Schoenling brands were purchased by Christian Moerlein Brewing Co. and on May 29, 2009 Bürger Classic and Bürger Light were officially relaunched at an event hosted at the Cincinnati Reds Hall of Fame and Museum. As of 2020, the beer is brewed under contract by the Latrobe Brewing Company.

== Beers ==
=== Former Beers ===
- Bürger Beer
- Bürger Bohemian
- Bürger Bräu
- Red Lion Ale
- Burger Ale
- Burger Bock
- Burger Tap
- Bohemian Tap
- Red Lion Malt Liquor
- Bürger Ice

=== Current Beers ===
- Bürger Classic
- Bürger Light
- Muskie Lager
