= Frederick Herbert (jockey) =

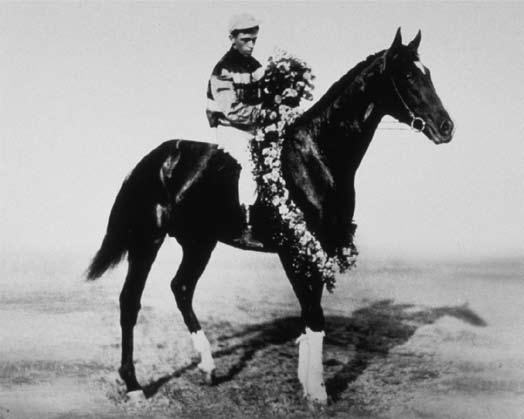
- Fred Herbert at the 1910 Kentucky Derby

Personal information
- Born: 1887 Hamilton, Ontario, Canada
- Died: 1955 (aged 67–68) Maidenhead, Berkshire, United Kingdom
- Occupation: Jockey

Horse racing career
- Sport: Horse racing

Major racing wins
- United States / Canada: King Edward Gold Cup Handicap (1909); Camden Handicap (1910); Demoiselle Stakes (1910); Mount Vernon Handicap (1910); England: May Maiden Plate (1912); Wokingham Stakes (1913); Cesarewitch Handicap (1913); Norfolk Stakes (1913); Great Metropolitan Handicap (1915); American Classics wins: Kentucky Derby (1910)

Significant horses
- Donau, Fiz-Yama, Hapsburg

Robert Frederick "Fred" Herbert (1887 – June 8, 1955) was a Canadian-born jockey, sometimes given the sobriquet "Brusher". From a riding career that lasted fifty years until he retired in 1947, his first big race win came aboard Donau in the 1910 Kentucky Derby.

Fred Herbert was the first Canadian jockey to win the Kentucky Derby but opportunities to earn a living in American horse racing were severely restricted when the New York Legislature under Republican Governor Charles Evans Hughes passed the Hart–Agnew anti-betting legislation with penalties allowing for fines and up to a year in prison. As a result, in 1912 Fred Herbert went to England where his father had been born. There, he would begin winning top level races, notably capturing the May Maiden Plate at Leicester Racecourse, the Wokingham and Norfolk Stakes, the Cesarewitch Handicap in 1913 and the Great Metropolitan Handicap in 1915.

Fred Herbert was living in Maidenhead, Berkshire when he died at age 68.

A 1995 article in the Chicago Tribune said that according to his daughter, he raced in Canada, Germany, Romania, France and in Moscow, where he placed second in the Moscow Derby. Also, an April 28, 1922 Daily Racing Form article reported Herbert had ridden in Australia, New Zealand, India and South Africa.
