= Christian Moerlein Brewing Co. =

Brewery in Cincinnati, Ohio

Christian Moerlein Brewing Company
- Interactive map of Christian Moerlein Brewing Company
- Type: Private
- Location: 242 W McMicken Ave, Cincinnati, Ohio
- Coordinates: 39.1198°N 84.5222°W
- Opened: 1853 (founded); 1981 (reintroduced)
- Key people: Christian Moerlein; Greg Hardman
- Owner: Jay Woffington
- Subsidiaries: Hudepohl-Schoenling Brewing Company
- Website: christianmoerlein.com

Active beers
Name	Type
Lager	Pale lager
Pitch Pilsner	German pilsner

Seasonal beers
Name	Type
Radler	Blood orange radler

Christian Moerlein Brewing Co. is a private beer company that began production in 1853 in Cincinnati, Ohio, by German immigrant Christian Moerlein. Before closing its doors in 1919 as result of prohibition, Christian Moerlein was among the ten largest American breweries by volume. In 1981, the brand was revived by the Hudepohl Brewing Company as a "better beer" a precursor to the craft beer category and is considered a pioneer craft beer of the craft beer movement. In 1999, Hudepohl-Schoenling Brewing Co. sold out to a group of investors, a sale that included the Christian Moerlein craft beer brand.

In 2004, Greg Hardman, a Cincinnati resident, purchased Christian Moerlein, as well as 65 other historic Cincinnati brands, returning local ownership to Cincinnati and eventually relocated brewing to the Over-the-Rhine neighborhood in 2010. Hardman also led the opening of the Christian Moerlein Lager House at The Banks development in February 2012.

In late 2019, a new group led by Jay Woffington purchased an ownership stake in the company renaming the enterprise to Cincinnati Beverage Company (CinBev). In part due to the COVID-19 pandemic and reports of slipping product quality the company closed the Moore Street brewing facility and fired Greg Hardman in early December 2020. In March 2021 a complete rebrand of the lineup of beers was announced.

== Early history & Hudepohl years ==
Christian Moerlein was a Bavarian immigrant born in Truppach, Kingdom of Bavaria, in 1818. He traveled to America in 1841 after becoming an apprentice brewer and blacksmith. He settled in the neighborhood of Cincinnati Ohio known as Over-the-Rhine, a heavily populated neighborhood of mostly Germans and German-Americans. In 1853, Moerlein opened the Christian Moerlein Brewing Company.

In its first year of production, the Christian Moerlein Brewing Company produced 1,000 barrels of beer. Just over a decade later, 26,000 barrels were being produced annually. When production reached its peak, Christian Moerlein beer was being shipped to places as far as Europe and South America and was the only Cincinnati beer exported internationally. In 1890, Moerlein also purchased the Nashville Brewing Company in Nashville, Tennessee, which was managed by Moerlein's apprentice William Gerst, who "assumed sole operations" in 1893, changing the name to the William Gerst Brewing Company. Moerlein died in 1897, but the Christian Moerlein Brewing Company continued until Prohibition began.

The company never recovered from Prohibition, and the brewery sat idle until the brand was reintroduced in 1981 by the Hudepohl Brewing Company. The new Christian Moerlein Brewing Company is part of the craft beer movement. The Christian Moerlein Select Lager was the first American beer to certifiably pass the Reinheitsgebot, the Bavarian Purity Law of 1516, shortly after the brand's revival.

== Rebirth ==
In 2004, the Christian Moerlein brand was purchased by Greater Cincinnati resident Greg Hardman. Over a period of five years, Hardman also acquired Hudepohl, Hudy Delight, Hudy 14-K, Burger, and Little Kings, the best-known of the Cincinnati brands. He purchased not only those, but 65 other long-forgotten brand names, such as Top Hat, Hauck, and Windisch-Muhlhauser, bringing many of the historical Cincinnati Brands under the same roof. Since the purchase, Christian Moerlein has reintroduced several classic Cincinnati brands including Hudepohl and Burger.

In 2010, Hardman purchased the former Husman Potato Chip factory at 1621 Moore Street. The location is just blocks from the original site of Christian Moerlein brewery in Over-the-Rhine. The first beer brewed in the new location was the 1861 Porter, which was made available on New Year's Eve 2010, in recognition of the 150th anniversary of Cincinnati's longest continuously running bar, Arnold's Bar and Grill.

A Christian Moerlein Lager House restaurant was opened on the Banks development in February 2012. This sits along the new Riverfront Park in Downtown Cincinnati and adjacent to Great American Ball Park, home of the Cincinnati Reds. The 15,000-square-foot (1,400 m^{2}) site is two stories tall and has multiple beer gardens. Approximately 500 seats are inside and an additional 600 can be seated outside. A large beer garden adjoins an outdoor event lawn on the new Riverfront Park. The building serves as a restaurant and a working microbrewery. Food featured on the menu replicates 19th-century German cuisine prominent in Over-the-Rhine's historic beginnings. The site provides live entertainment.

In 2013 the Christian Moerlein production brewery opened to full operations. It is in the site of the historic Kauffman Brewery and a former Husman Potato Chip factory. The brewery had the capacity to brew 15,000 barrels in its first year (2013) with plenty of additional space to add capacity.

Since Greg Hardman's ownership of Christian Moerlein Brewing Co., they have acquired all remaining brands of the Hudepohl-Schoenling Brewing Company, and Moerlein is the first American craft brewery of the current era to gather a city's heritage beer brands under one ownership. The current Hudepohl-Schoenling Brewing Company is a subsidiary of the Christian Moerlein Brewing Co.

Two of the modern company's breweries are located close to the route of the new Cincinnati Streetcar. In 2015 Brad Thomas, a member of the Southwest Ohio Regional Transit Authority board, convinced four different brewers with breweries near the streetcar's route to each brew a new specialty beer to honor the delivery of the first five vehicles. The two Christian Moerlein brews were the Christian Moerlein Tap Room and the Moerlein Lager House.

=== Produced beers ===
The following is a non-exhaustive list of beers produced and canned under the Hardman-led era of Christian Moerlein. Since the 2021 rebrand, it was announced that a variety of the former beers would still be kept available at the Moerlein Lager House. A great variety of more rotated beers was frequently featured at the Lager House, which has its own brewing facilities.

==== Annual ====
- Barbarossa
- Bay of Bengal
- Big Hazy
- Exposition Vienna Style Lager
- OTR Ale
- Original Lager
- Power Stoutage
- Third Wave IPA

==== Seasonal ====
- Emancipator Doppelbock
- Fifth & Vine Oktoberfest
- Glier's Goetta Lager
- Christkindl Ale
- Saengerfest Lager
- Strawberry Banana Pig

== Rebrand & ownership change ==
In late 2019 a new ownership group bought a stake in the company, renaming it Cincinnati Beverage Company (CinBev). In mid-2020 the company released two new varieties of Little Kings Cream Ale: a Blood Orange and Agave Lime variety.

In December 2020, it was announced that the company would halt production at their OTR facility, in part due to the financial stresses brought on by the COVID-19 pandemic. At the same time it was reported that former owner Greg Hardman was also let go. Owner Jay Woffington, who joined the company in early 2020, announced that the company would continue to brew with a contract brewer for the immediate future.

At the same time, the ownership group undertook a complete rebrand of the lineup of beers provided by Moerlein. In March 2021 the new lineup of beers was announced. The company did announce that a handful of the former beers would be kept available seasonally at the Moerlein Lager House.

After the Cincinnati Bengals completed a historic playoff run to Super Bowl LVI, the company resurrected the "Hu-Dey" cans which had been previously produced by Hudepohl during previous Super Bowl runs in 1981 and 1989. Only 2,800 6-packs were planned to be produced and long lines wrapping around city blocks in Over the Rhine.
