= Blackstone Brewing Company =

Craft brewery in Nashville Tennessee

- Industry: Alcoholic beverage
- Founded: 1994
- Headquarters: 2312 Clifton Ave; Nashville, Tennessee; United States
- Products: Ale and lager beer
- Owner: Kent Taylor
- Website: blackstonebrewing.com

The Blackstone Brewing Company is a craft brewery in Nashville, Tennessee, United States. Founded by Kent Taylor and Stephanie Weins in 1994, it claims to be Nashville's oldest craft brewery. The original brewpub, called Blackstone Restaurant and Brewery, opened on New Year's Eve 1994 and operated until 2016. In 2011, the company built a production brewery nearby and opened a tap house for the public in 2016. Blackstone also brews traditional European lagers for the Nashville Brewing Company. Blackstone Brewing Company has received more awards than any other brewery in Nashville, winning multiple medals at the World Beer Cup and the Great American Beer Festival.

== Brewpub (1994–2016) ==
On December 31, 1994, Blackstone Restaurant and Brewery opened to the public as a joint venture between Kent Taylor and Stephanie Weins. Weins ran the day-to-day operations of the restaurant while Taylor, a CPA, handled the finances. The restaurant was known for serving wood-fired pizzas, fish and chips, burgers, and other high-end pub food. The entrance had a lintel engraved with "Licensed to Brew Ales, Porters & Stouts". The flagship beers were originally homebrews developed by Taylor. Weins and Taylor recruited Dave Miller to be the brewmaster; he brewed in a 15 bbl Century-made brewhouse. Miller was a well-known brewer in St. Louis and the author of several books on homebrewing.

Blackstone's St. Charles Porter, a brown porter named after Taylor's son, Charles, won Gold at the 1996 World Beer Cup. It would go on to win eight Great American Beer Festival Awards, making it one of the most awarded beers, and the most awarded Brown Porter, in the country. Other flagship beers included Chaser Pale, a Kölsch beer named after Weins' son Chase, and Nut Brown Ale; both of which have won multiple national awards.

Weins died of lung cancer in February, 2014, and a non-profit organization called "Stephanie's Fight" was founded with the sole purpose of raising money for lung cancer research. Later that year, a limited release Belgian Dubbel called "Stephanie's Dubbel" was brewed, with 100% of the proceeds going to lung cancer research. A year and a half after Weins' death, the brewpub closed and all operations moved to the production brewery.

== Production brewery (2011–present) ==
Taylor and Weins built a large production brewery in 2011 a mile (1.6 km) from the brewpub. The brewery is equipped with a state-of-the-art 30-barrel brewhouse built by ROLEC GmbH from Chieming, and a bottling line built by KRONES AG from Neutraubling, both from Germany. In 2015, Blackstone became the first brewery in Tennessee to install a centrifuge as part of its beer filtration system. The Alfa Laval Brew 250, a Swedish made centrifuge, uses centrifugal force to remove small particles from the beer.

Several years after the production brewery opened, Miller retired as brewmaster. Chase Wilkerson (son of Stephanie Weins) now runs the daily operations of the production facility. Blackstone Brewing Company distributes its beers across the state of Tennessee. The Blackstone Taphouse, which overlooks the brewing operations, opened to the public in 2016, the day after the brewpub closed. The Taphouse features a permanent food truck, a converted bus known as the B-Stone Bus, which serves some of the favorites from the original brewpub.

== Historical significance of location ==
Both Blackstone Restaurant and Brewery and Blackstone Brewing Company were built on the original land tract that was home to Nashville's first brewery. The Nashville Porter and Ale Brewery was founded by T.M. Burland in 1815 and operated for several decades, obtaining water from nearby Cockrill Spring. Beer historian and owner of the Nashville Brewing Company, Scott Mertie, sponsored a historical marker in 2019 recognizing the Nashville Porter and Ale Brewery, as well as memorializing Weins' role with Blackstone Brewing Co.

== Beers ==
Blackstone's flagship beers include Chaser Pale (Kolsch), Nut Brown Ale and St. Charles Porter. Other brews include a series of India Pale Ales, stouts, Sour Ex-Girlfriend (a series of sour beers), as well as seasonal and other specialty beers.

In 2016, Taylor and Wilkerson partnered with long-time friend, Scott Mertie, to brew traditional European-style lagers through the historic Nashville Brewing Company. These award-winning lagers are brewed in Blackstone's German brewhouse. They studied the production methods of the original company, which operated from 1859 to 1890, in order to produce the same lager beers that immigrants would have brewed in the late 19th century.

== Major awards ==
Blackstone Brewing Company has won numerous awards at the Great American Beer Festival and World Beer Cup. Blackstone's St. Charles Porter is the most awarded Brown Porter in the country. Their Nut Brown Ale and Chaser Pale have also won awards.
