= Low-alcohol beer =

Type of beverage

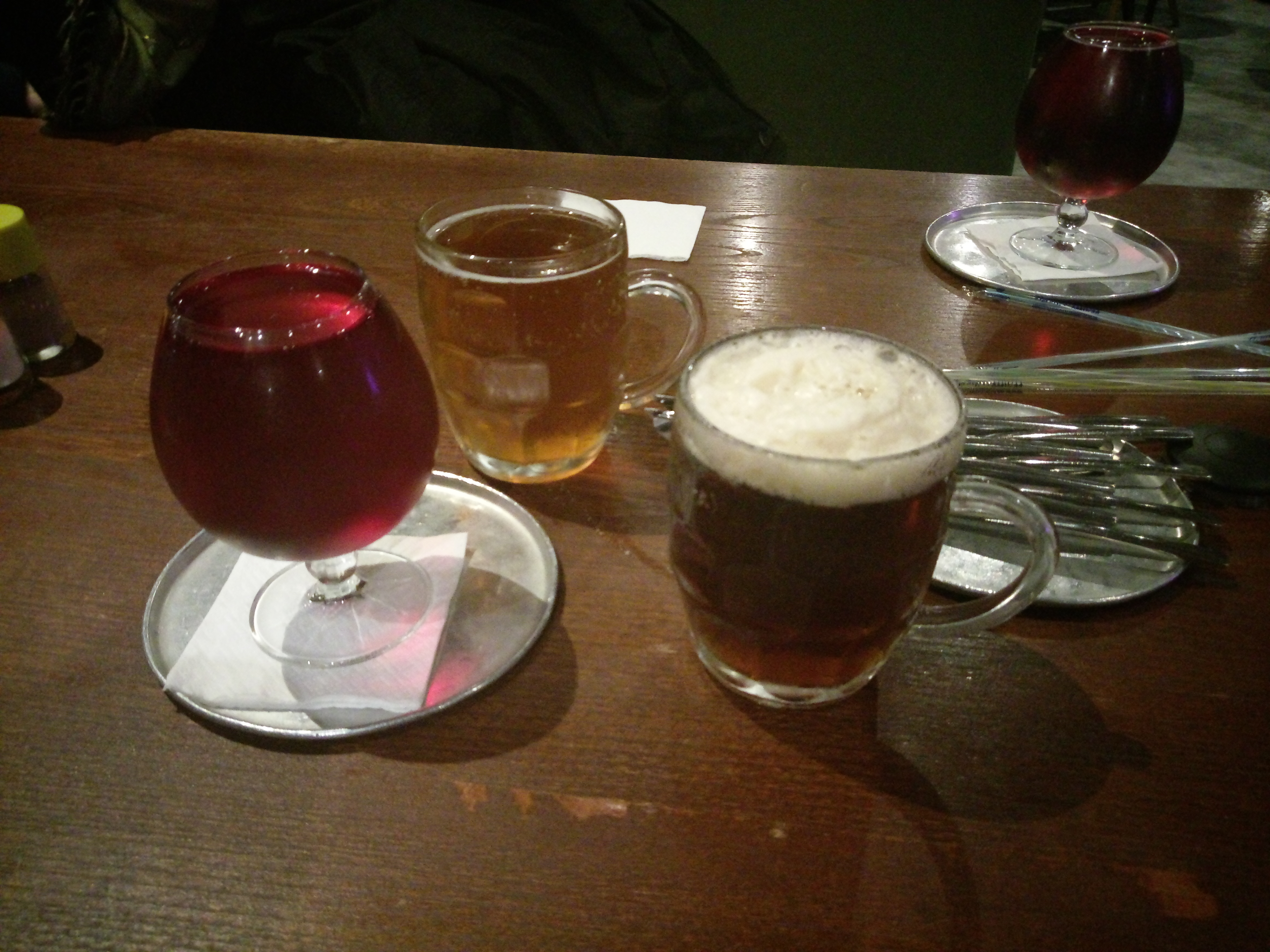
Examples of zero-alcohol beer in Iran. Per the Iranian interpretation of fiqh, purchasing and consuming alcoholic drinks is prohibited in the country.

Low-alcohol beer is beer with little or no alcohol by volume that aims to reproduce the taste of beer while eliminating or reducing the inebriating effect, carbohydrates, and calories of regular alcoholic brews. Low-alcohol beers can come in different beer styles such as lagers, stouts, and ales. Low-alcohol beer is also known as light beer, non-alcoholic beer, small beer, small ale, or near-beer.

== History ==
Low-alcohol brews such as small beer date back at least to medieval Europe, where they served as a less risky alternative to polluted water supplies (which were often polluted by faeces and parasites) and were less expensive than higher-quality, higher-alcohol brews like stouts, porters, and ales.

More recently, the temperance movements and the need to avoid alcohol while driving, operating machinery, taking certain medications, etc. have led to the development of non-intoxicating beers.

In the United States, according to John Naleszkiewicz, non-alcoholic brews were promoted during Prohibition. In 1917, President Wilson proposed limiting the alcohol content of malt beverages to 2.75% to try to appease avid prohibitionists. In 1919, Congress approved the Volstead Act, which limited the alcohol content of all beverages to 0.5%. These very-low-alcohol beverages became known as tonics, and many breweries began brewing them in order to stay in business during Prohibition. Since removing the alcohol from the beer requires just one extra step, many breweries saw it as an easy change. In 1933, when Prohibition was repealed, breweries simply omitted this extra step.

By the 1980s and 1990s, "light" beers became more popular. Declining consumption has also led to the introduction of mass-market non-alcoholic beverages, dubbed "near beer". Low-alcohol and alcohol-free bars and pubs have also been established to cater for drinkers of non-alcoholic beverages.

In the UK, the introduction of a lower rate of beer duty for low-strength beer (of 2.8% ABV or less) in October 2011 spurred many small brewers to revive old styles of small beer and create higher-hopped craft beers at the lower alcohol level to be able to lower the cost of their beer to consumers.

At the start of the 21st century, alcohol-free beer has seen a rise in popularity in the Middle East (which now makes up a third of the market). One reason for this is that Islamic scholars issued fatawa which permitted the consumption of beer as long as large quantities could be consumed without getting drunk. By 2022, craft hop water has become a market unto itself in the United States, with one Southern California brewer regarding it as not being beer at all.

== Pros and cons ==
Positive features of non-alcoholic brews include the ability to drive after consuming several drinks, the reduction in alcohol-related illness, and fewer severe hangover symptoms. Low-alcohol and alcohol-free beers are usually lower in calories than equivalent full-strength beers.

Many alcohol free beers are labelled as isotonic, leading some to support the consumption of these drinks after exercise, especially intense cardio sessions. However, given the sodium levels are not sufficiently high to replenish what may be lost through sweat, experts advise caution in advertising this as a recovery drink.

Some common complaints about non-alcoholic brews include a loss of flavor, addition of one step in the brewing process, sugary taste, and a shorter shelf life. There are also legal implications. Some state governments, e.g. Pennsylvania, prohibit the sale of non-alcoholic beers to persons under the age of 21. A study conducted by the department of psychology at Indiana University said, "Because non-alcoholic beer provides sensory cues that simulate alcoholic beer, this beverage may be more effective than other placebos in contributing to a credible manipulation of expectancies to receive alcohol", making people feel "drunk" when physically they are not.

There is little to no research on consequences of drinking such products in pregnancy, but as they may contain trace amounts of alcohol, in rare cases even higher than 1% (despite labelling as 0%), one paper advises against drinking this type of non-alcoholic beverage during pregnancy.

== Categories ==
In the United States, beverages containing less than 0.5% alcohol by volume (ABV) were legally called non-alcoholic, according to the now-defunct Volstead Act. Because of its very low alcohol content, non-alcoholic beer may be legally sold to people under age 21 in many American states.

In the United Kingdom, Government guidance recommends the following descriptions for "alcohol substitute" drinks including alcohol-free beer. The use of these descriptions is voluntary:

- No alcohol or alcohol-free: not more than 0.05% ABV
- Dealcoholized: over 0.05% but less than 0.5% ABV
- Low-alcohol: not more than 1.2% ABV

In some parts of the European Union, beer must contain no more than 0.5% ABV if it is labelled "alcohol-free".

In Australia, the term "light beer" refers to any beer with less than 3.5% alcohol.

=== Light beer ===
Light beers are beers with reduced caloric content compared to regular beer, and typically also have a lower alcoholic content, depending on the brand and where they are sold. The spelling "lite beer" is also commonly used. Light beers are manufactured by reducing the carbohydrate content, and secondarily by reducing the alcohol content, since both carbohydrates and alcohol contribute to the caloric content of beer.

Light beers are marketed primarily to drinkers who wish to manage their calorie intake. However, these beers are sometimes criticized for being less flavorful than full-strength beers, being "watered down" (whether in perception or in fact), and thus advertising campaigns for light beers generally advertise their retention of flavor.

In Australia, regular beers have approximately 4%-5% ABV, while reduced-alcohol beers have 2.2%–3.2%.

In Canada, regular beers typically have 5% ABV, while a reduced-alcohol beer contains 2.6%–4.0% ABV and an "extra-light" beer contains less than 2.5%.

In the United States, most mass-market light beer brands, including Bud Light, Coors Light, and Miller Lite, have 4.2% ABV, less than ordinary beers from the same makers which are 5% ABV.

In Sweden, low alcohol beer is either 2.2%, 2.8% or 3.5%, and can be purchased in an ordinary supermarket whereas normal strength beers of above 3.5% must be purchased at Systembolaget. Beer containing 2.8-3.5% ABV (called Folköl or "Peoples' Beer") may be legally sold in any convenience store to people over 18 years of age, whereas stronger beer may only be sold in state-run liquor stores to people older than 20. In addition, businesses selling food for on-premises consumption do not need an alcohol license to serve 3.5% beer. Virtually all major Swedish brewers, and several international ones, in addition to their full-strength beer, make 3.5% folköl versions as well. Beer below or equaling 2.25% ABV (lättöl) is not legally subject to age restrictions; however, some stores voluntarily opt out from selling it to minors anyway.

Similarly, in Norway, beer with an alcohol content of up to 4.7% ABV can be sold in ordinary supermarkets, though within restricted hours. Any beer exceeding this limit, as well as wine and spirits, must be purchased at the state-run Vinmonopolet. Due to high alcohol taxes, there is also a wide variety of low-alcohol beers (known as lettøl) available in supermarkets, as these are significantly more affordable for consumers.

=== Low-point beer ===
Low-point beer, which is often known in the United States as "three-two beer" or "3 point 2 brew", is beer that contains 3.2% alcohol by weight (equivalent to about 4% ABV).

The term "low-point beer" is unique to the United States, where some states limit the sale of beer, but beers of this type are also available in countries (such as Sweden and Finland) that tax or otherwise regulate beer according to its alcohol content.

In the United States, 3.2 beer was the highest alcohol content beer allowed to be produced legally for nine months in 1933. As part of his New Deal, President Franklin D. Roosevelt signed the Cullen–Harrison Act that repealed the Volstead Act on 22 March 1933. In December 1933, the Twenty-first Amendment to the United States Constitution was passed, eliminating a federal level prohibition on the production and sale of alcoholic beverages and returning to the states the power to regulate them within their borders.

After the repeal of Prohibition, a number of state laws prohibiting the sale of intoxicating liquors remained in effect. As these were repealed, they were first replaced by laws limiting the maximum alcohol content allowed for sale to 3.2 ABW. As of 2026, Minnesota is the last state where 3.2 ABW beer is still necessary. Yet only general establishments such as supermarket chains and convenience stores are required to conform to this limit. These stores are facing shortages because 3.2 ABW only remained in production to meet the once-widespread legal limit. In the 2010s, Colorado, Kansas, Oklahoma, and Utah revised state laws to end this practice.

Missouri also has a legal classification for low-point beer, which it calls "nonintoxicating beer". Unlike Minnesota and Utah, Missouri does not limit supermarket chains and convenience stores to selling only low-point beer. Instead, Missouri's alcohol laws permit grocery stores, drug stores, gas stations, and even "general merchandise stores" (a term that Missouri law does not define) to sell any alcoholic beverage; consequently, 3.2% beer is rarely sold in Missouri.

=== Near beer ===
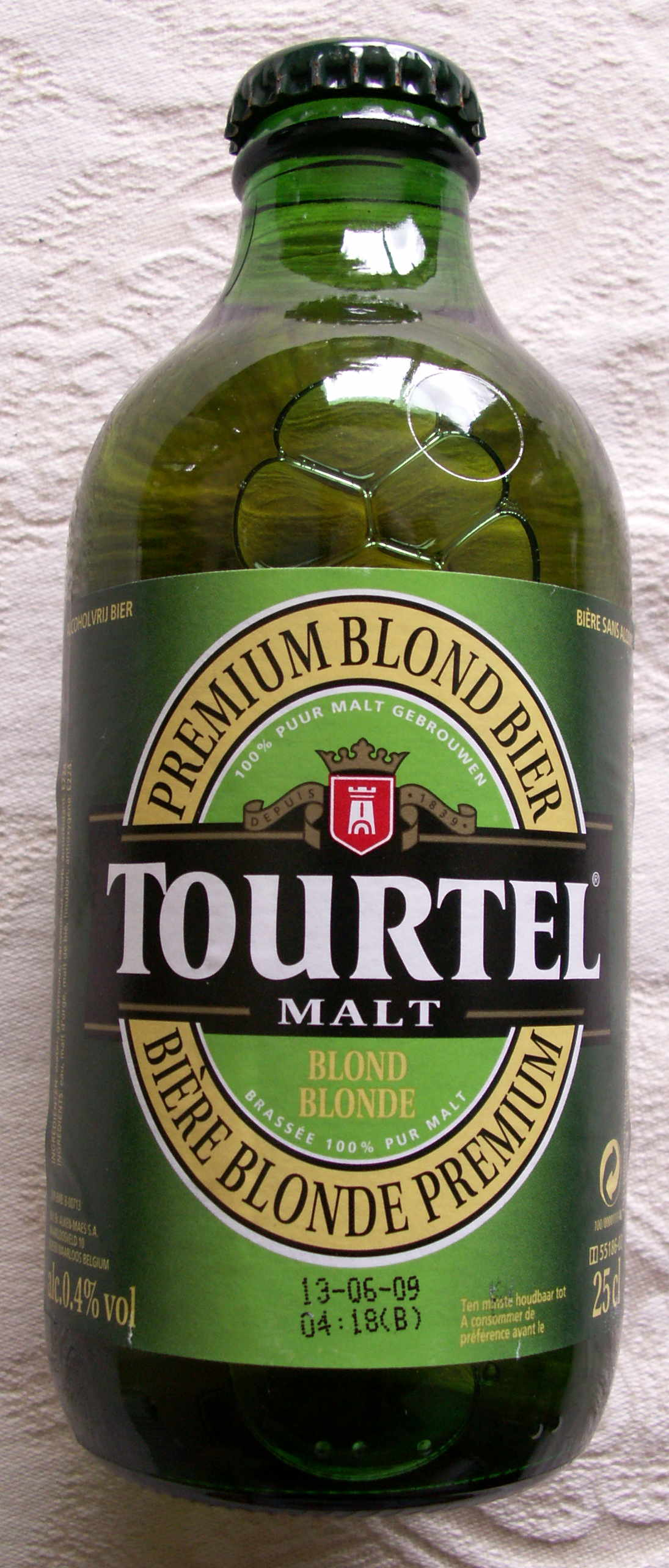
Tourtel, a near-beer which has 0.4% ABV

"Near beer" was a term for malt beverages containing little or no alcohol (less than 0.5% ABV), which were mass-marketed during Prohibition in the United States. Near beer could not legally be labeled as "beer" and was officially classified as a "cereal beverage".

The most popular "near beer" was Bevo, brewed by the Anheuser-Busch company. The Pabst company brewed "Pablo", Miller brewed "Vivo", and Schlitz brewed "Famo". Many local and regional breweries stayed in business by marketing their own near-beers. By 1921, production of near beer had reached over 300 million US gallons (1 billion L) a year (36 L/s).

A popular illegal practice was to add alcohol to near beer. The resulting beverage was known as spiked beer or needle beer, so called because a needle was used to inject alcohol through the cork of the bottle or keg.

Food critic and writer Waverley Root described the common American near beer as "such a wishy-washy, thin, ill-tasting, discouraging sort of slop that it might have been dreamed up by a Puritan Machiavelli with the intent of disgusting drinkers with genuine beer forever."

In the early 2010s, major breweries began experimenting with mass-market non-alcoholic beers to counter with declining alcohol consumption amid growing preference for craft beer, launching beverages like Anheuser-Busch's Budweiser Prohibition Brew, launched in 2016.

A drink similar to "near beer", "bjórlíki" was quite popular in Iceland before alcoholic beer was made legal in 1989. The Icelandic variant normally consisted of a shot of vodka added to a half-a-litre glass of light beer.

=== Small beer ===
Small beer (also, small ale) is a beer/ale that contains very little alcohol. Sometimes unfiltered and porridge-like, it was a favored drink in Medieval Europe and colonial North America as opposed to the often polluted water and the expensive beer used for festivities. Small beer was also produced in households for consumption by children and servants.

However, small beer/small ale can also refer to a beer made of the "second runnings" from a very strong beer (e.g., scotch ale) mash. These beers can be as strong as a mild ale, depending on the strength of the original mash. This was done as an economy measure in household brewing in England up to the 18th century and is still done by some homebrewers. One commercial brewery, San Francisco's Anchor Brewing Company, also produces their Anchor Small Beer using the second runnings from their Old Foghorn Barleywine. The term is also used derisively for commercially produced beers which are thought to taste too weak.

=== Non-alcoholic beer ===
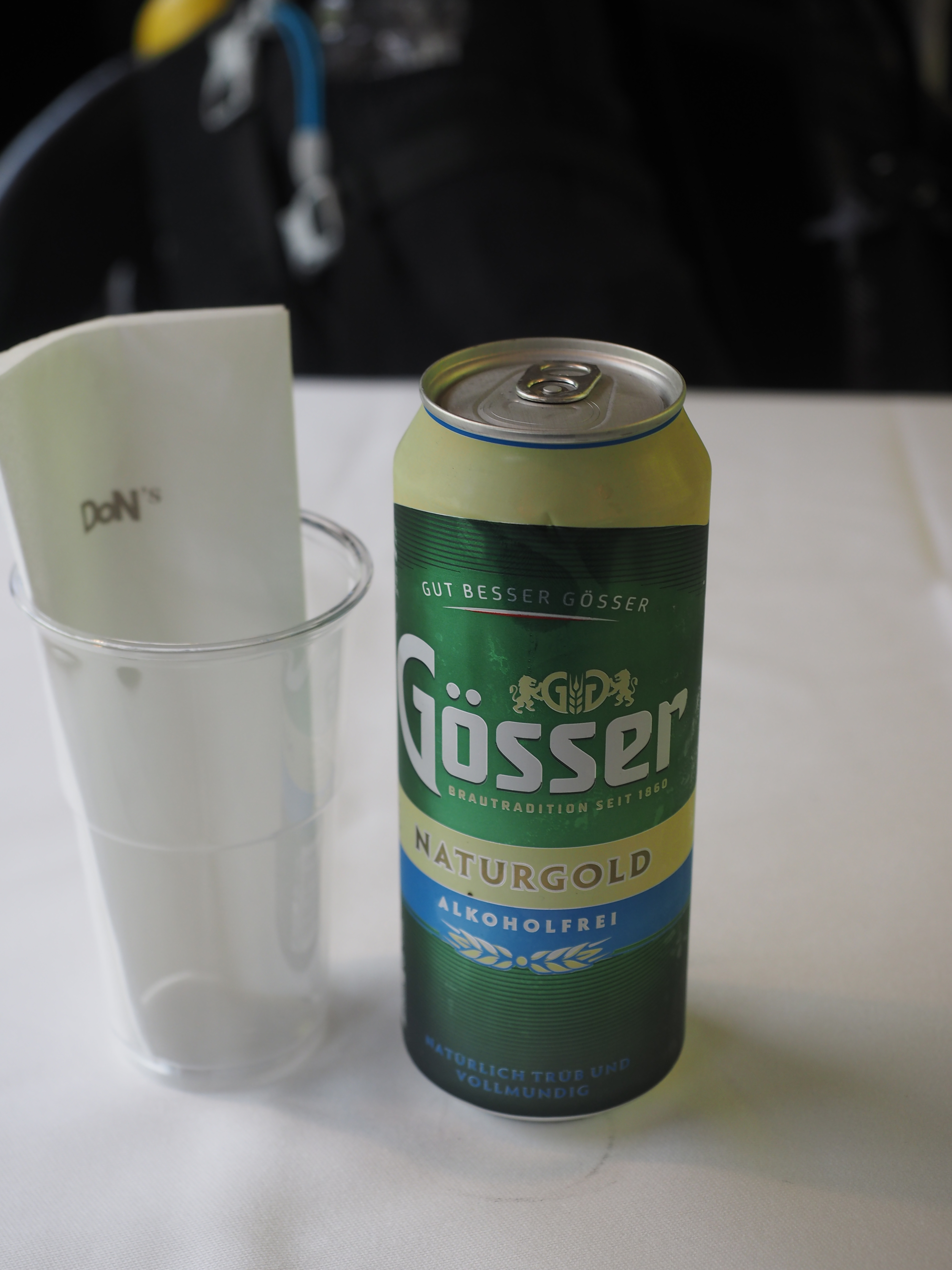
A can of non-alcoholic beer from the Austrian brewery Gösser

As more people consume non-alcoholic beverages for health reasons, social reasons, or because they want to enjoy the taste of beer without the effects of alcohol, the global non-alcoholic beer market was expected to double by 2024 from the level in 2018.

==== Arab world ====
The Middle East accounts for almost a third of worldwide sales of nonalcoholic and alcohol-free beer.

==== Malaysia ====
The market for nonalcoholic beer in Malaysia has been slow in comparison to other Muslim-majority countries, and as of 2015, the Malaysian government has not approved any non-alcoholic beers as halal.

According to the Malaysian Islamic Development Department (JAKIM), beverages made with the same intention and process as liquor are considered non-halal, regardless of alcohol content. A minister in the Prime Minister's Department stated that using the name "alcohol-free beer" is confusing to Muslims because the production process is the same as for alcoholic products.

==== Iran ====
In 2008, the sale of non-alcoholic beers in Iran continued its high performance with double-digit growth rates in both value and volume and is expected to more than double its total volume sales between 2008 and 2013.

==== India ====
Non alcoholic beer sales in India are relatively low.

==== United States ====
The United States has seen a rise in non-alcoholic beer consumption from 2013 to 2023.

==== Europe ====
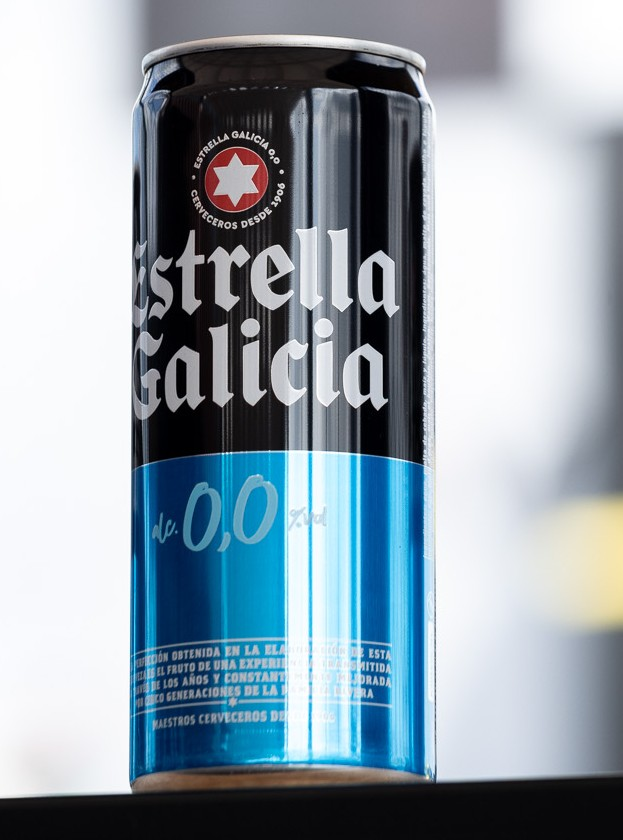
A can of Estrella Galicia 0,0, a non-alcoholic beer from Spain

In 2014 Spain was the main consumer and producer of low-alcohol beer in the European Union.

==== United Kingdom ====
As of March 2020, sales of alcohol-free beer were up by 30% since 2016, with younger generations shunning alcoholic beverages. Brewers have introduced low or no alcohol varieties of established brands to meet the increased demand for low-alcohol beers, and new low-alcohol brands such as Lucky Saint have seen success in the UK market.

== Legal drinking age in the US ==
Beers that are labeled "non-alcoholic" still contain a very small amount of alcohol. Thus, some US states require the purchaser to be 21 years old, which is the legal drinking age in the United States. Exceptions include:

- In Texas, the law does not prohibit minors from consuming or buying non-alcoholic beer, but does specify that a beverage containing more than 0.5% ABV is an alcoholic beverage and thus will follow the same restrictions as regular beer.
- In Minnesota, non-alcoholic beer (less than 0.5% ABV) does not fit in the category that the state defines as an alcoholic beverage and can be purchased by those under the legal drinking age.
- In Wisconsin, the law does not regulate non-alcoholic beer (less than 0.5% ABV), which can be purchased without any age restriction.
- In New Jersey, the law governs only beverages of at least 0.5% ABV.
- In Illinois, beverages with under 0.5% ABV are not governed by the Illinois Liquor Control Act and can be purchased and consumed by minors.
- In the District of Columbia, the District's alcohol laws apply to all beverages and food products that have 0.5% ABV or higher, and prohibit their purchase by anyone under 21. The laws do not reference products labeled as "non-alcoholic beverage."
- In Alaska, "...non-alcoholic beer and wine (containing less than 0.5% alcohol by volume)" are not considered alcoholic beverages.
- In Hawaii, Hawaii State Liquor Law §281-1 defines liquor as "...containing one-half of one per cent or more of alcohol by volume...," and a minor as "any person below the age of twenty-one years."

== Production process ==
According to the Birmingham Beverage Company, the brewing process of traditional brews consists of eight basic steps, nine for brewing non-alcoholic brews.

1. Malting – Barley is prepared by soaking it in water and allowing the grain to germinate or "sprout". This allows the tough starch molecules to be softened and begin converting to sugars. Next, the sprouts are dried in a kiln; the temperature at which the sprouts are dried will affect the flavor of the finished brew.
2. Milling – Next the malted grain is ground to a cornmeal-like consistency, which allows the sugars and remaining starches to be more easily released when mixed with water.
3. Mashing – The finely-ground malted grain is mixed with water and pulverized. By pulverizing the slurry, most of the remaining starches are converted to sugars due to enzymes present in the malt, and the sugars then dissolve into the water. The mix is gradually heated to 75 °C (167 °F) in a mash tun. The slurry is then filtered to remove the majority of particulates. This filtered sugary liquid is called "wort".
4. Brewing – The wort is brought to a boil for roughly one to two hours. During this time, other grains that contribute flavor, color, and aroma to the brew are added. Boiling allows several chemical reactions to occur and reduces the water content in the wort, condensing it.
5. Cooling – The wort is filtered to remove the majority of the grains and hops and then immediately cooled to allow the yeast to survive and grow in the next step.
6. Fermenting – The cooled wort is saturated with air, and yeast is added in the fermentation tank. Different strains of yeast create different styles of beer. This step takes around ten days.
7. Maturation – The freshly fermented uncarbonated beer is placed into a conditioning tank and, in a similar process to wine making, is allowed to age. If this step is rushed the beer will have an off flavor (acetaldehyde) that beer experts sometimes refer to as "green beer" because of its resemblance to green apples. During this process of aging, the majority of the residual particulates will settle to the bottom of the tank.
8. Alcohol removal – Typical low- and non-alcohol beers go through an alcohol-reducing step right before finishing.
9. Finishing – The beer is filtered one last time; it is then carbonated and moved into a storage tank for either bottling or kegging.

Typical low- and non-alcohol beer starts out as regular alcoholic beer, which is then processed to remove the alcohol.

- The simplest (and cheapest) method is to merely add water to it until the desired alcohol level is reached.
- Older processes heat the beer to evaporate most of the alcohol. Since alcohol is more volatile than water, as the beer is heated alcohol boils off first. The alcohol is allowed to escape and the remaining liquid becomes the product, in what is essentially the opposite of the process used to make distilled beverages.
  - Most modern breweries utilize vacuum evaporation to reduce the boiling temperature which better maintains flavor: the beer is placed under a light vacuum to facilitate the alcohol molecules going into the gaseous phase. If a sufficient vacuum is applied, it is not necessary to "cook" the beer at a temperature that destroys the flavor. Some heat must nevertheless be supplied to counter the heat lost to enthalpy of vaporization.
- A modern alternative process uses reverse osmosis to avoid heating the product at all. Under pressure, the beer is passed through a polymeric filter with pores small enough that only alcohol and water (and a few volatile acids) can pass through. A syrupy mixture of complex carbohydrates and most of the flavor compounds are retained by the filter. Alcohol is then distilled out of the filtered alcohol-water mix using conventional distillation methods. The water and remaining acids are added back into the syrup left behind on the filter, followed by the normal finishing process of carbonation and bottling.
- Another modern process is "dual-stage vacuum filtration". Flavor and aroma is captured first in a low vacuum stage, then the beverage is placed into an even lower vacuum until water and ethanol separate. The flavor, aroma and remaining beverage are then recombined to create a non-alcoholic stream of the input beverage (beer, wine, or cider), preserving the flavor, aroma, and color; the ethanol can be used to make a mostly flavorless hard seltzer base. In the United States, the technology is classified as a "filter" by the TTB, and therefore requires no additional permits or licensing.

A different approach to making 0.5% non-alcoholic beer is to reduce the formation of alcohol in the first place, so that craft brewers do not need to pay the expense of having to dealcoholize a beer. Methods include using special low-sugar grains, yeast which converts less sugar to alcohol, or removing sugar from the wort before fermentation. These can be combined with limited fermentation, in which the fermentation process is stopped early.

In 2023, the Australian brand, sörzero, became among the first to release a "molecularly brewed" non-alcoholic beer with a true 0.00% ABV rating. Developed by a team of scientists at the University of New South Wales, the "molecular brewing" process relies on food chemistry rather than traditional fermentation.

== Identity ==
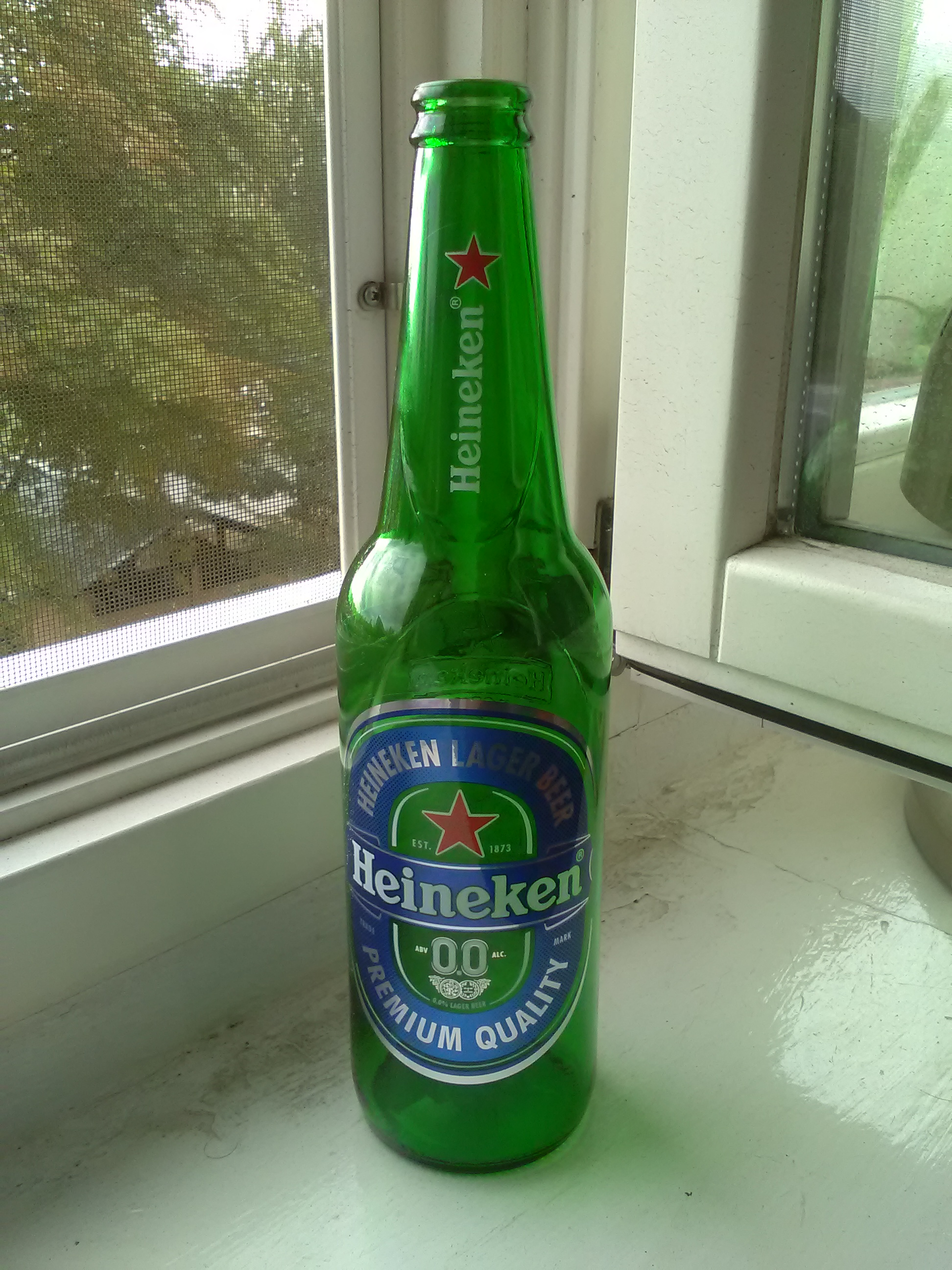
Example of Heineken 0.0%

In an attempt to create a readily recognizable identity for low-alcohol beer, some brands were incorporating the colour blue into the packaging design as of 2018, including Becks Blue, Heineken 0.0%, Ožujsko Cool and Erdinger Alkoholfrei.

== See also ==
- Light beer
- Alcohol by volume
- Barbican (drink)
- Beer
- Kvass
- Malzbier
- Malta (soft drink)
- Small beer
