= Nashville Brewing Company =

Brewery

- Industry: Alcoholic beverage
- Founded: 1859
- Headquarters: 2312 Clifton Avenue; Nashville, Tennessee; United States
- Products: European style lager beer
- Owner: Scott R. Mertie
- Website: nashvillebrewing.com

The Nashville Brewing Company originally operated from 1859 to 1890 in Nashville, Tennessee. It was later renamed the Gerst Brewing Company and operated until 1954. The brewery was revived in 2016 by beer historian Scott R. Mertie, who had written a history of the Nashville brewing industry a decade earlier.

== History ==
=== Foundation as Nashville Brewing Company (1859–1892) ===
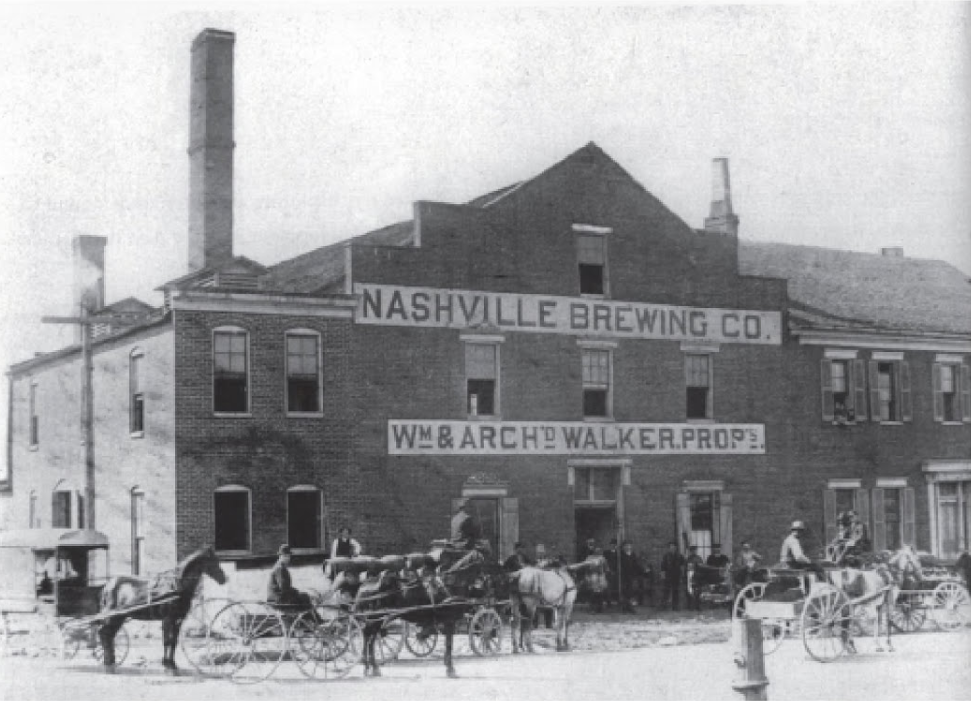
Photograph of the old Nashville Brewing Company facility circa 1885.

The city of Nashville, Tennessee was designated to be the capital of the state in 1843. This prompted a population boom, including a number of German immigrants who came to the area in the 1850s with a cultural preference for beer drinking, contributing to the growth of a market for beer that was more freshly brewed then the product that could typically be imported from other states. Among these immigrants was Jacob Stifel, who in 1859 opened a small brewery, which would eventually become the Nashville Brewing Company, and which was "the first production brewery in Nashville". The company's facilities were initially located on South High Street, which later became Sixth Avenue South.

Production was interrupted during the American Civil War, but the company resumed operations in 1864, with Stifel taking on Louis Pfeiffer as a business partner, and the brewery being renamed the South Nashville Brewery, as there was also a small brewery in North Nashville (Germantown) called the North Nashville Brewery. An 1873 news article referred to the brewery as a "mammoth establishment", being "of proportions much larger than one would suppose who had not visited it".

Pfeiffer died suddenly in April 1876, and the company was then sold in an auction. The purchaser was John B. (J.B.) Kuhn, who took over its operations and changed the name to South Nashville Ale and Lager Beer Brewery. In 1877, Kuhn sold the company to Clement Albert (C.A.) Maus and Brothers from Indianapolis, IN, who in 1880 sold it to John Burkhardt. Burkhardt then changed the name to the Nashville Brewing Company. During one period in 1880, the company advertised an offer to pay $100 "to any person who can produce a better and purer quality of beer than we are now manufacturing in our brewery". In 1882, Burkhardt entered into a partnership with William and Archibald Walker, two Scottish brothers from Cincinnati. The Walker brothers bought complete control of the company from Burkhardt in 1885. Archibald Walker died in 1889, prompting surviving brother William to convey ownership of the company again in 1890.

=== Ownership by Moerlein Brewing (1890-1892) ===
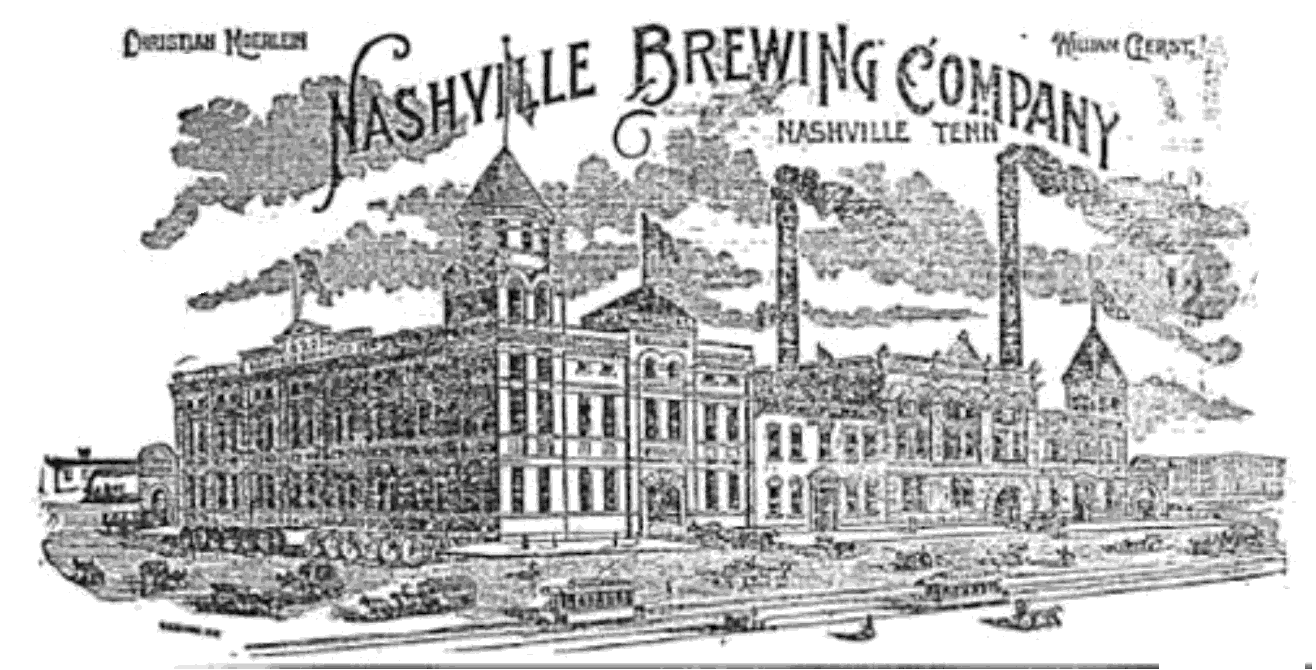
Illustration of the Nashville Brewing Company from an 1891 advertisement, after it had been rebuilt by Moerlein-Gerst in 1890

In 1890, the business and the property were purchased by Christian Moerlein of Cincinnati, proprietor of the famous Christian Moerlein Brewing Co., and his apprentice William Gerst. The existing facility was razed, and Moerlein and Gerst initially planned to invest "between $250,000 and $500,000 into the Nashville Brewing Company", by their own account to "erect the finest and largest brewery in the whole Southern Country" on the property. In 1893, Gerst, who had moved to Nashville while Moerlein remained in Cincinnati, "assumed sole operations", changing the name of the company to the William Gerst Brewing Company. The brewery continued operations through prohibition until closing in 1954.

=== Revival of the Nashville Brewing Co (2016-present) ===
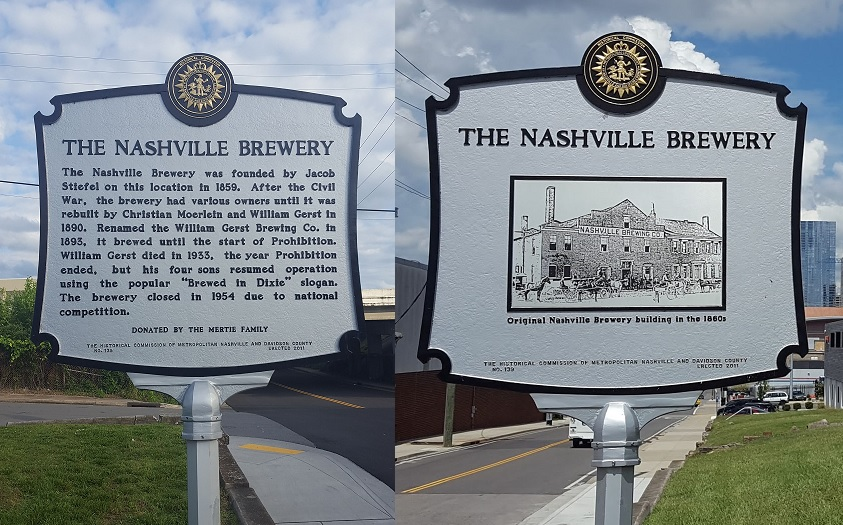
Historical Marker representing the Nashville Brewery

Local businessman and beer historian, Scott R. Mertie, wrote a book on Nashville's Brewing History, which was published in 2006. It spanned the period from the early 18th century to the modern day microbreweries in Nashville. In 2011, Mertie coordinated with the Metro Nashville Historical Commission to erect a historical marker where the Nashville Brewing Company/Gerst Brewing Company once operated.

In 2016, the Nashville Brewing Company was restarted by Mertie, who partnered with long-time friend Kent Taylor to have the historical European-style lagers brewed by Blackstone Brewing Company, Nashville's oldest craft brewery, having been established in 1994. They made an intense study of the production methods of the original company in order to produce the same lager beers that the immigrants would have brewed in the late 1800s.

In May 2018, the revived company won a silver medal at the prestigious World Beer Cup for its Nashville Lager, in the Munich Helles category. In September of the same year, the company won a bronze medal in the 2018 Great American Beer Festival competition's kellerbier/zwickelbier category for its NashZwickel, an unfiltered lager. The brewery has won numerous other awards for their traditional lagers.

In April 2019, the brewery was among the handful of local breweries to be featured in a Sports Illustrated piece, "The NFL Draft (Beer) Guide: Getting a taste of draft host Nashville's Craft Brewery Scene", published in conjunction with the 2019 NFL draft in Nashville.

In May 2019, Mertie and Vanderbilt University anthropology professor John Janusek used ground-penetrating radar to map the area beneath downtown Nashville's 6th Avenue South, in an attempt to locate tunnels and cellars thought to have been used by the original Nashville Brewing Company, and its successor, the William Gerst Brewing Company. The results of that search will determine whether the Vanderbilt University anthropology department will begin an archaeological excavation.

At the October 2020 Great American Beer Festival, the company won a silver medal for its Nashville Lager in the Munich Helles category.

== Beers ==
All of Nashville Brewing Company's beers are brewed in accordance with the Reinheitsgebot, the German Beer Purity Law of 1516. These traditional lagers are brewed with barley malt and hops, which are imported from Europe.

- Nashville Original Lager (Munich Helles - bright, golden lager)
- Nashville Amber Lager (pre-prohibition style lager brewed with Vienna malt)
- NashZwickel (Kellerbier-Zwickelbier, an unfiltered lager)
- Nashville Festbier (Oktoberfest-Märzen)
- Nashville 1897 Pilsner (Czech Pilsner)
- Nashville Dunkel (Munich Dunkel)
- Nashville Bock Beer (traditional winter Bock Beer)
- Nashville Holiday Bock (Bock with holiday spices)
- Nashville Smoked Beer (traditional Rauchbier of Bamberg, Germany)
- Nashville Black Lager (Schwarzbier)
- Various specialty and seasonal beers

== Awards ==
Nashville Light Category: (Light Lager)

- Gold - 2023 Great American Beer Festival

Nashville Original Lager Category: Munich Helles/Bavarian Helles

- Silver - 2020 Great American Beer Festival
- Silver - 2018 World Beer Cup
- Gold - 2019 Can Can Awards
- Gold - 2018 Can Can Awards
- Bronze - 2017 Can Can Awards
- Silver - 2019 All About Beer Magazine's Beer Army Beer Wars
- Silver - 2018 All About Beer Magazine's Beer Army Beer Wars
- Gold - 2017 All About Beer Magazine's Beer Army Beer Wars

NashZwickel Category: (Kellerbier-Zwickelbier)

- Bronze - 2018 Great American Beer Festival

Nashville Festbier Category: (Oktoberfest-Märzen)

- Gold - 2019 All About Beer Magazine's Beer Army Beer Wars
- Gold - 2018 All About Beer Magazine's Beer Army Beer Wars

Nashville Bock Beer Category: (Bock Beer)

- Gold - 2019 All About Beer Magazine's Beer Army Beer Wars
