= Yazoo Brewing Company =

Brewery in Nashville, Tennessee

- Industry: Alcoholic beverage
- Founded: 2003
- Headquarters: 900 River Bluff Drive Madison, Tennessee United States
- Products: Beer
- Owners: Linus and Lila Hall
- Website: www.yazoobrew.com

Yazoo Brewing Company is a regional brewery in Nashville, Tennessee, United States. It was co-founded in 2003 by brewmaster Linus Hall and his wife, Lila. It has since expanded operations and won several awards.

== History ==
The brewery was located in what was once the Marathon Motor Works factory building in downtown Nashville, but moved to The Gulch in March, 2010. The new brewery featured an expanded taproom with 18 taps and a patio for outdoor seating with a forty barrel brewing system. In spring of 2019 the brewery relocated to Madison, Tennessee. The new site overlooks the Cumberland River and is also home to the third Grillshack location.

Linus Hall and his wife Lila are both from Mississippi, and moved to Nashville in 1996. Linus Hall built the brewery.

As of October, 2026, Yazoo announced that Tailgate Brewery purchased it's physical assets. Tailgate Brewery's founder, Wesley Keegan, stated that Yazoo's beer would still be produced in the facility.

== Awards ==
- Embrace The Funk Cherry Deux Rouges won Bronze in the "Wood- and Barrel-Aged Sour Beer" category at the 2014 Great American Beer Festival.
- The Yazoo Hefeweizen won the gold medal in the "South German-Style Hefeweizen/Hefeweissbier" category at the 2004 Great American Beer Festival.
- Best Microbrewery, 2005 Best of Nashville, Nashville Scene.
- Best Local Beer, Yazoo Pale Ale, 2006 Best of Nashville, Nashville Scene.
- Best Underground Happy Hour, Yazoo Tap Room, 2007 Best of Nashville Nashville Scene.

== Etymology ==
The name Yazoo is taken from the Yazoo River, which meets the Mississippi River in Hall’s hometown, Vicksburg, Mississippi.

== Beers ==
- Pale Ale
- Dos Perros
- Hefeweizen
- Hop Perfect
- Sue
- Sly Rye Porter
- Onward Stout
- Various seasonal beers
- Embrace The Funk (Series of Sour and Wild beers)

== See also ==
- Barrel-aged beer
