= Kellerbier =

Type of German beer

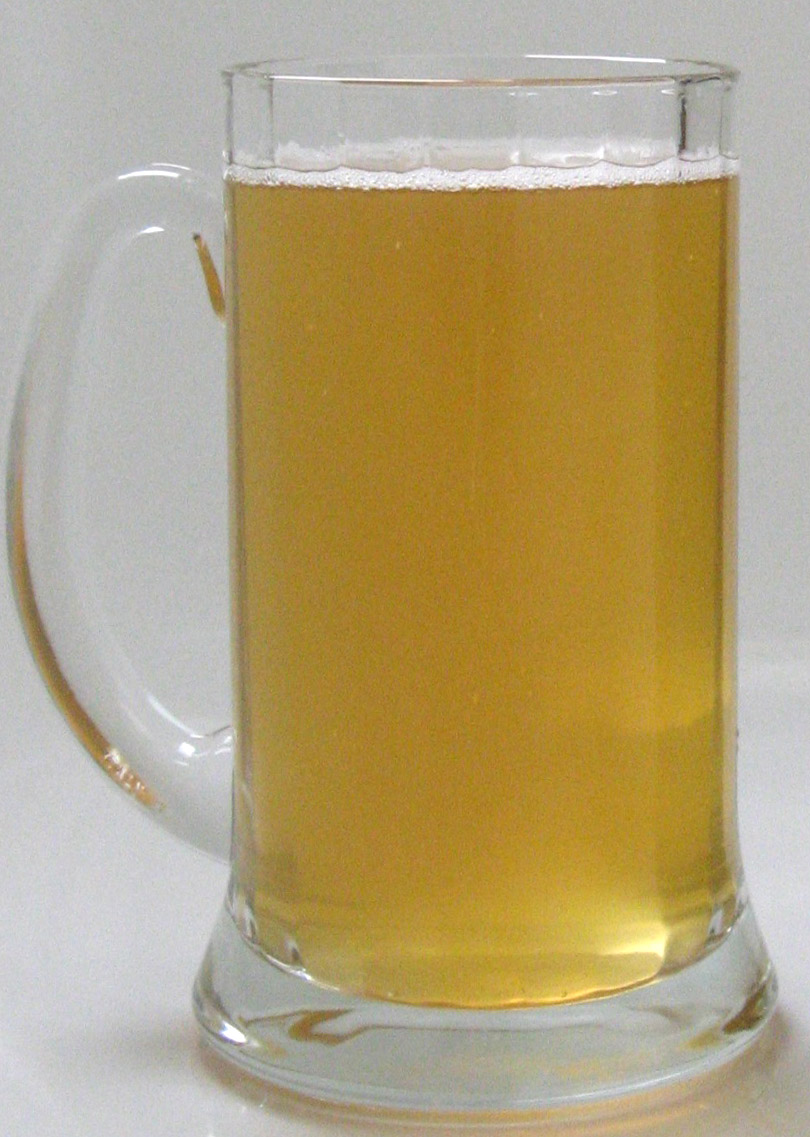
Kellerbier

Kellerbier (German: [ˈkɛlɐˌbiːɐ̯]; lit. 'cellar beer') is a type of German beer, an unfiltered lager originating in Franconia.

Kellerbier contains more of its original brewing yeast, held in suspension. As a result, it is distinctly cloudy, and is described in German as naturtrüb (naturally cloudy).

Kellerbier is often served directly from the barrel in a beer garden, but may be bottled as well.

== Zwickelbier ==
The term Zwickelbier (German: [ˈt͡svɪkl̩ˌbiːɐ̯]), regionally Zwickel or Zwickl, refers to a weaker and less full-flavored variant of Kellerbier. Originally, it was used to refer to the small amount of beer taken by a brewmaster from the barrel with the aid of a special siphon called the Zwickelhahn.

It is less hoppy, and typically not left to age as long as Kellerbier.
