= Bavarian Brewing Company =

- Type: Private
- Industry: Beverages
- Founded: 1866
- Founder: Julius Deglow
- Defunct: 1966
- Headquarters: Covington, Kentucky, United States
- Key people: William Riedlen; Lucia Riedlin Schott, William C. Schott, George Schott, Louis Schott, William R. Schott and Louis L. Schott
- Products: Beers, ales, malt liquors, soft drinks and ice.

- Bavarian Brewing Company
- U.S. National Register of Historic Places
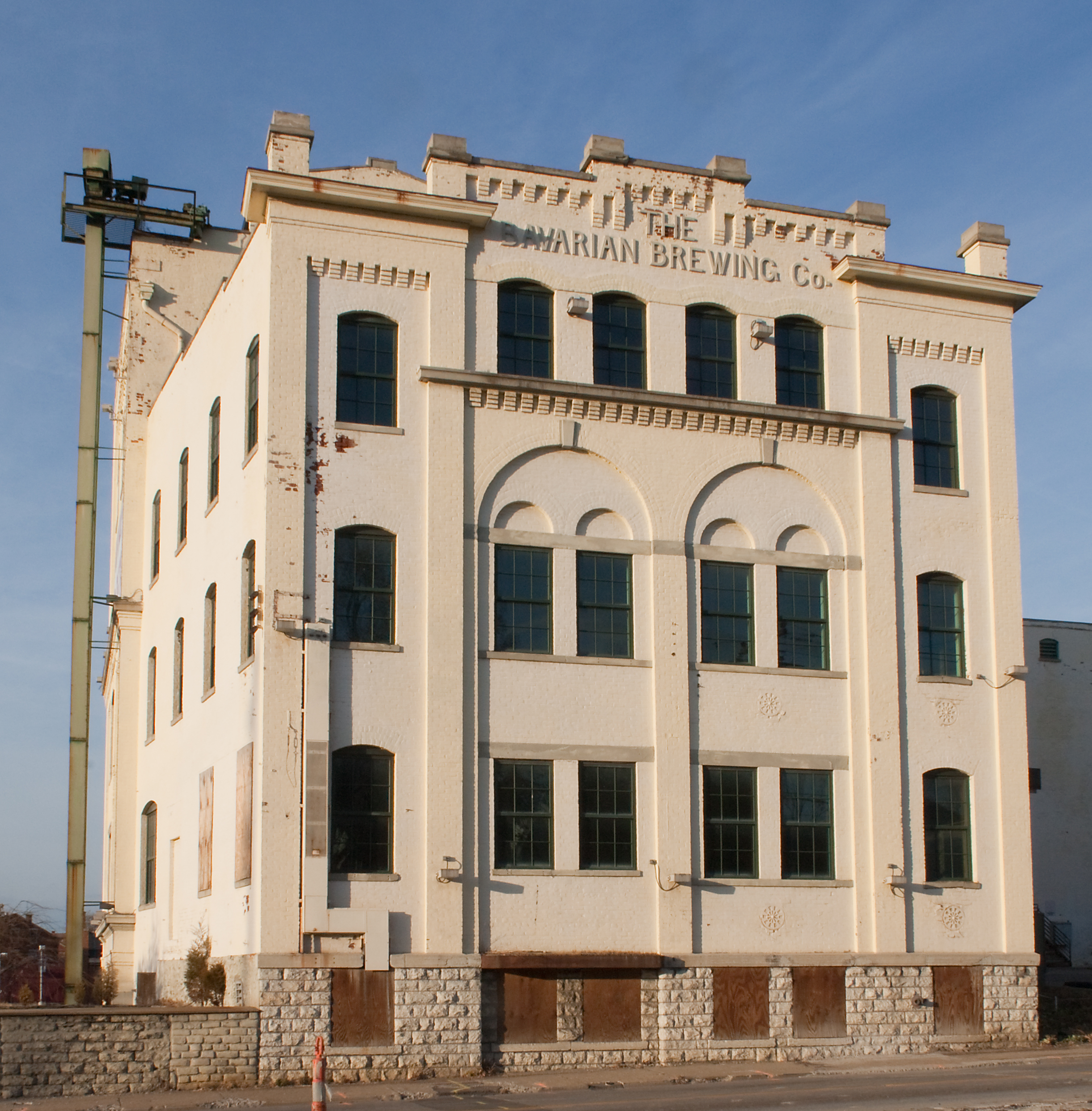

- Location within Kentucky Location within the United States
- Location: 522 W. 12th St., Covington, Kentucky
- Coordinates: 39°4′38″N 84°31′5″W
- Architectural style: Romanesque
- NRHP reference No.: 96000281
- Added to NRHP: March 21, 1996

Bavarian Brewing Company was a brewery established in Covington, Kentucky, in 1866 by Julius Deglow, but became known as the Bavarian Brewery around 1870. The brewery was originally located on Pike Street, but expanded to 12th Street within a decade. After John Meyer acquired the brewery in 1881, he sold an interest to William Riedlin in 1882. The company operated under the proprietorship of Meyer & Riedlin starting in 1884, before becoming incorporated as the Bavarian Brewery Co. in 1889 by William Riedlin. The company was family owned until it was acquired by International Breweries, Inc.(IBI) in 1959. However, it operated as the Bavarian Division of IBI and continued to produce its flagship beer, Bavarian's, until the facility closed in 1966. The property was placed on the National Register of Historic Places and renovated as a multipurpose complex for food, beverage and entertainment uses in 1996. It operated as the Brew Works at the Party Source and Jillian's, but closed in 2006. The former structure containing the Brew and Mill Houses, built in 1911, was repurposed into office space becoming part of the Kenton County Government Center, opening in 2019. This office complex has a Bavarian Brewery Exhibit and it is accompanied by a Bavarian Brewery (United States) website.

== Early history ==
After the brewery was established as DeGlow & Co., new ownership interests within just a couple of years resulted in several change to its name beginning in 1868, including DeGlow, Best & Renner. However, around 1870, it was established as the Bavarian Brewery Co. Over the next several years the brewery normally operated under this name, but ownership interests varied. John Meyer obtained controlling interest in the brewery in 1881. Then in 1882, a German immigrant named William Riedlin, who established a saloon and beer hall called Tivoli Hall in the Over-the-Rhine area of Cincinnati, entered into partnership with John Meyer. It operated as the Meyer-Riedlin Brewery beginning in 1884. Then, in 1889, the brewery was incorporated into the Bavarian Brewing Co., Inc., with William Riedlin becoming the President. A couple years later, Riedlin acquired John Meyer's ownership interest. Besides Bavarian Beer, the company also offered Riedlin Select Beer and Riedlin Blue Ribbon Beer. A large number of changes were made to the facility during Riedlin's tenure.

The brewery began in a building on Pike Street and its site also included two ice ponds, ice houses, lager cellars and various sheds. The brewery expanded to 12th Street, and within a couple decades had added new wagon sheds, a Malt House, a Brew House and a Boiler House. After the brewery incorporated, new construction included a new bottling plant in 1892, which took advantage of important bottling innovations including the crown bottle cap and pasteurization, which increased the shelf life of beer. This enabled beer to be distributed to a much wider area. A new Ice Plant was also built producing 100,000 pounds of ice daily. Ice was used in the lager fermentation process before refrigeration became available. It was also sold to the public and provided at no cost to saloons in exchange for selling Bavarian beverages. In the mid-1890s new stables, a Boiler House and an Engine Room were added. Starting around 1900, a new Ice Plant, manufacturing 200,000 pounds of ice daily, was built, as was a new Stock House. By 1913, the Boiler House, the Tall Stack, Engine Room, Brew/Mill Houses, Bottling Plant and Office Building had all been replaced and an addition was built onto the Stock House. By 1914, the brewery complex had evolved into a state of the art brewery facility comprising a total land area of six and one-half-acres. The annual beer production was 215,000 barrels, increasing from only 7,341 barrels in 1870, and the Bavarian Brewing Co. became the largest brewery in Kentucky.

Beer production in Kentucky was abruptly halted at the end of November, 1918, but the storage and sale of beer was permitted into mid 1919, even though Prohibition didn't officially begin until several months later. To prevent a complete closure of the brewery, arrangements were made to bottle non-alcoholic beverages under the name of the William Riedlin Beverage Company. However, William Riedlin died in early 1919. His son, William Riedlin Jr., died within only a couple weeks after his father. He had been a Vice President of the brewery and wasbriefly in charge of the company. Shortly after the deaths of the father and son, the brewery property produced near-beer, non-alcoholic beverages and malt extract. By the mid-1920s the buildings were closed and all the brewery equipment was liquidated.

== Post-Prohibition: 1930s and 1940s ==
Prohibition was repealed in 1933, but it wasn't until 1935 that the Bavarian Brewing Co. reopened under Murray L. Voorhees who had married Riedlin's granddaughter, Rosemary. The company struggled financially and went into receivership in 1937. The brewery and its assets were purchased U.S. District Court in December, 1937, by William C. Schott, the husband of Riedlin's daughter Lucia, and his three brothers, George, Lou and Chris. The brewery was incorporated under the new ownership in January, 1938. The Schott brothers were successful businessmen who owned and operated the Cincinnati Galvanizing Company and had previously been involved with J. M. Schott & Sons Cooperage Co., a business founded by their father that made wood barrels for the brewing industry.

In 1939, George was the company's President, William became Vice President, Chris resigned as Secretary and was replaced by Lou. In 1945, George resigned, Louis Schott became President and William R. Schott, the eldest son of Lucia Riedlin and William C. Schott, became Secretary /Treasurer. Key brand beer names bottled at the brewery included: Bavarian Beer (draft), Bavarian Master Brand (bottled), and Bavarian Bock Beer. Other offerings included Schott's Ale and, at a somewhat earlier period for only a short time, Cincinnati's Pride Brand Beer to commemorate the Cincinnati Union Terminal. The brewing company thrived between 1947 and 1952 when it operated around the clock to meet demand. During those prosperous years the company acquired the Bruckmann Brewery Plant on Spring Grove in Cincinnati for warehouse distribution in 1948 and the Heidelberg Brewery of Covington in 1949. In 1950, a new warehouse was built at Fricke Road and Beekman Street in Cincinnati.

== The 1950s and 1960s ==
However, in 1952 Bavarian raised its prices to offset their increased costs of operating of two plants. The following year beer annual production dropped from 350,000 barrels to just over 200,000 barrels. To reduce their costs, Bavarian decided they needed to consolidate operations in their main plant and make arrangements to dispose unnecessary property. In 1955, Lou Schott resigned as President. William C. Schott remained as Vice President, and his sons, William R. (Bill) Schott and Louis L. Schott, became President and Secretary/Treasurer, respectfully. It was during this period that Bavarian built a new bottling department at their main plant and liquidated their excess property. By the end of 1955 Bavarian had sold the smaller Heidelberg plant and one of the warehouse facilities in order to be more cost competitive. However, the brewery had still lost market share to local competitors and was under pressure from the national breweries.

In particular, Anheuser-Busch introduced Busch Bavarian Beer in 1954 and a year later it was clear that this brand would soon be expanded nationally, including the Cincinnati area. To defend their rights to their name, Bavarian brought suit against the St. Louis based brewery for trademark infringement and unfair competitive practices, in Bavarian Brewing Company v. Anheuser-Busch. The trial began in October 1956 and was pitted as a David and Goliath battle. In March, 1957, a final verdict was rendered that prohibited Anheuser-Busch from marketing the Busch beer in the tri-state region where Bavarian sold its beer. But Bavarian was denied exclusive use of the name and reimbursement for unfair competitive practice was also rejected by the court. Still, economies of scale made it difficult for smaller brewers like Bavarian to compete with the national breweries. In an effort to increase sales, there was a makeover of Bavarian's Old Style Beer in mid-1957 to Bavarian/s Select Beer, which had a much different logo and a contemporary ad campaign. In late 1957, a local young woman from Dayton, OH, Brenda Cotter, was hired to be an ambassadress for the brewery, becoming the Bavarian Girl. The combination of the newly designed packaging and extensive advertising improved Bavarian's image. Another effect is that it created some interest in the company by other brewers.

In hopes of associating with a larger enterprise that could bolster the brewery, Bavarian merged with International Breweries Inc. (IBI) in 1959. The patriarch for the Schott family, William C. Schott, retired from the brewery at that time. Bill Schott remained in charge of the Bavarian plant and became an Executive Vice President of IBI. His brother, Louis, who had been involved in developing the new Bavarian/s Select image, remained until 1961 and then joined the family's Cincinnati Galvanizing Co. A year before, IBI added a new state of the art, $500,000 bottling to the Bavarian plant. In 1962 Bavarian's Beer received a first-prize award at a European beer festival. In an effort to improve distribution and increase sales, IBI had bottled their other brands of beers and ales in the Bavarian plant including, FrankenMuth, Old Dutch, Silver Bar and Phoenix along with Tropical Ale, IBI Malt Liquor and Malta Huey. In addition, IBI tried to enlarge the distribution area of Bavarian/s Beer by producing it in their other plants located in Tampa, FL, Buffalo, NY and Findlay, OH. Yet, despite some success, operations for Bavarian were just short of breaking even in 1962 and by 1964 there was a yearly loss of $500,000. IBI's strategy proved unsuccessful and fell victim to the economic advantages of the larger national brewers. Bill Schott left IBI in 1965, thus ending the involvement of the Riedlin and Schott families at Bavarian spanning 83 years. IBI exited the brewery business and changed their name in 1966. The Bavarian Brewery in Covington, KY, was closed that same year, one hundred years after the origins of the brewery began.

== Past and present uses of the property ==
The landmark Bavarian Brewery building fell into disrepair over the next three decades. However, its accessibility and visibility from Interstate 75, just a couple exits from downtown Cincinnati, as well as its unique Romanesque and "castle like" architecture, made it an attractive economic development project for the City of Covington. In 1996 the property became listed on the National Register of Historic Places and was rehabilitated by Ken Lewis into the Brew Works at the Party Source for a couple of years. Then for eight years Jillian's operated it as a restaurant and nightclub, until it closed in 2006. The property was purchased in 2008 by Columbia Sussex, a casino and hotel company, with hopes that Kentucky would pass gambling laws, allowing the property to be converted as a casino. When that failed, the owner tried to tear down the main brewery structure, even though they had previously agreed to preserve it when they removed the former bottling plant and other ancillary buildings a few years earlier. This resulted in a "Save the Bavarian" movement to retain the brewery structure. At the same time, the administration offices for Kenton County had become outdated and alternative locations were being considered. After a study was conducted, Kenton County officials decided to purchase the former Bavarian Brewery property in 2016 for its own use. The former structure containing the Brew and Mill Houses was renovated and combined with a new building to form the Kenton County Government Center, opening in 2019. A Bavarian Brewery Exhibit, explaining the history of the brewery and property over 150 years, along with display cases showing artifacts, is located off of the main lobby of this office complex.
