= Kim Bingham =

Canadian musician

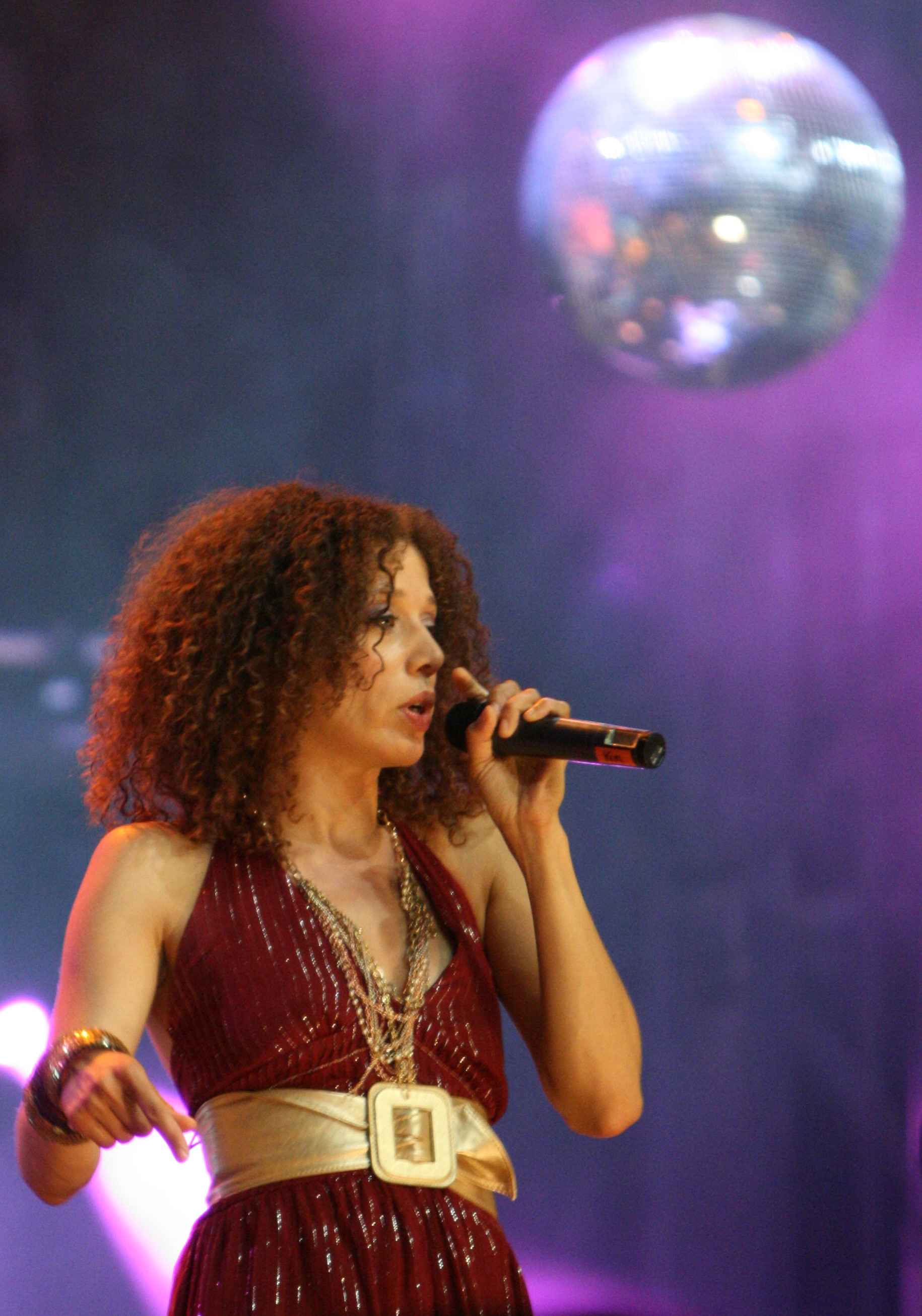
- Bingham at the Montreal Jazz Festival 2008

Background information
- Also known as: Mudgirl
- Origin: Montreal, Quebec, Canada
- Genres: Pop, rock, alt rock, third wave ska, film scores
- Occupations: Singer, musician
- Instruments: Vocals, guitar
- Years active: 1990s–present
- Label: Mudgirl Music Group
- Website: kimbingham.com

Kim Anna Bingham, also known by her stage names Mudgirl and The Kim Band, is a Canadian singer, guitarist, composer, songwriter and musician. She is known for her musical collaborations with Nelly Furtado, Bran Van 3000, and David Usher.

== Career ==
=== 1990–1994: Me Mom and Morgentaler ===
Bingham began her career in music as a member of the Montreal, Quebec, third-wave ska band Me Mom and Morgentaler formed in 1990. The band became known for elaborate live performances and spectacles of vaudevillian-styled performance art. With the band, Bingham recorded three works: Clown Heaven and Hell EP (1991), Shiva Space Machine (1993), and Live We Are Revolting: Live & Obscure 1990–1994 (1994).

=== 1994–1999: Mudgirl ===
In 1994, Bingham left Me, Mom, and Morgentaler and moved to Vancouver, British Columbia, where she formed the project Mudgirl with drummer/vocalist Glenn Kruger (Carly Rae Jepsen, the Paperboys, Bloody Chicletts), who enlisted bassist/vocalist Russell Less (from indie bands Innocents Abroad, the Ground), and upstart ingenue guitarist Lucas Truman. Her moniker "Mudgirl" was chosen based on "the title of a short story she wrote about a young waif made of mud" intended for children. She stated, "Mudgirl is an extension of myself where I get to be cartoony and a bit surreal." In 1996, Mudgirl released their debut five-song EP First Book which included three Canadian radio hits "This Day", "Adjusted", and "Contact" (written by Russell Less). Kim also produced a handful of popular videos for those single which were featured on MuchMusic, and performed some dates in the U.S., including a July 1996 performance with Mudgirl at Lilith Fair.

=== 1999–2006: The Kim Band ===
After five years as Mudgirl, Bingham decided to change the name of her collective to "The Kim Band". Under this moniker, she released the album Girlology (2001), produced by Steven Drake (The Odds, The Tragically Hip). The album featured the radio singles "What A Drag", "Valentine's Day", and "Quel Dommage". Her French version of "What A Drag," reached No. 1 on the French-Canadian radio charts.

=== Collaborations with David Usher, Nelly Furtado, and Bran Van 3000: 2000–2003: Touring, bands ===
From 2001 until 2003, Bingham worked with Canadian singer David Usher as a guitarist and backing vocalist. "Black Black Heart" is a song written by Usher and Jeff Pearce and for which the operatic female vocal is provided by Bingham, while the chorus samples The Flower Duet (Sous le dôme épais), a duet for sopranos from Léo Delibes' opera Lakmé, as a hook. "Black Black Heart" won two MuchMusic Video Awards for Best Post-Production and Best Pop Video in 2002.

In 2003 and early 2004, Bingham toured Europe and the U.S. with pop singer Nelly Furtado as a guitarist and backing vocalist in Furtado's band. Bingham also collaborated with Bran Van 3000 and is featured on the albums Rosé and The Garden. Bingham also toured in Canada as part of Bran Van 3000, including a concert as the main act at the Montreal Jazz Festival in 2008.

=== Les Invincibles 2005–2009 ===
From 2005 to 2009, Bingham composed the soundtrack for the television trilogy Les Invincibles with three seasons on the original Canadian television production (broadcast on Radio Canada) and two seasons on the reprised European versions, a Franco-Belgian-German production (broadcast on Arte). In 2007, Bingham's original music for the Canadian series was nominated for Best Original Score at the Prix Gémeaux television award; Bingham won the Best Theme Song award with the theme song "The Heroes Take", shared with co-writer and show creator Jean-François Rivard. Also in 2007, at the request of fans of the Canadian television show, Bingham performed and produced the soundtrack album Les Invincibles with the support of Warner Music Canada.

=== UP! and single releases 2010–2020 ===
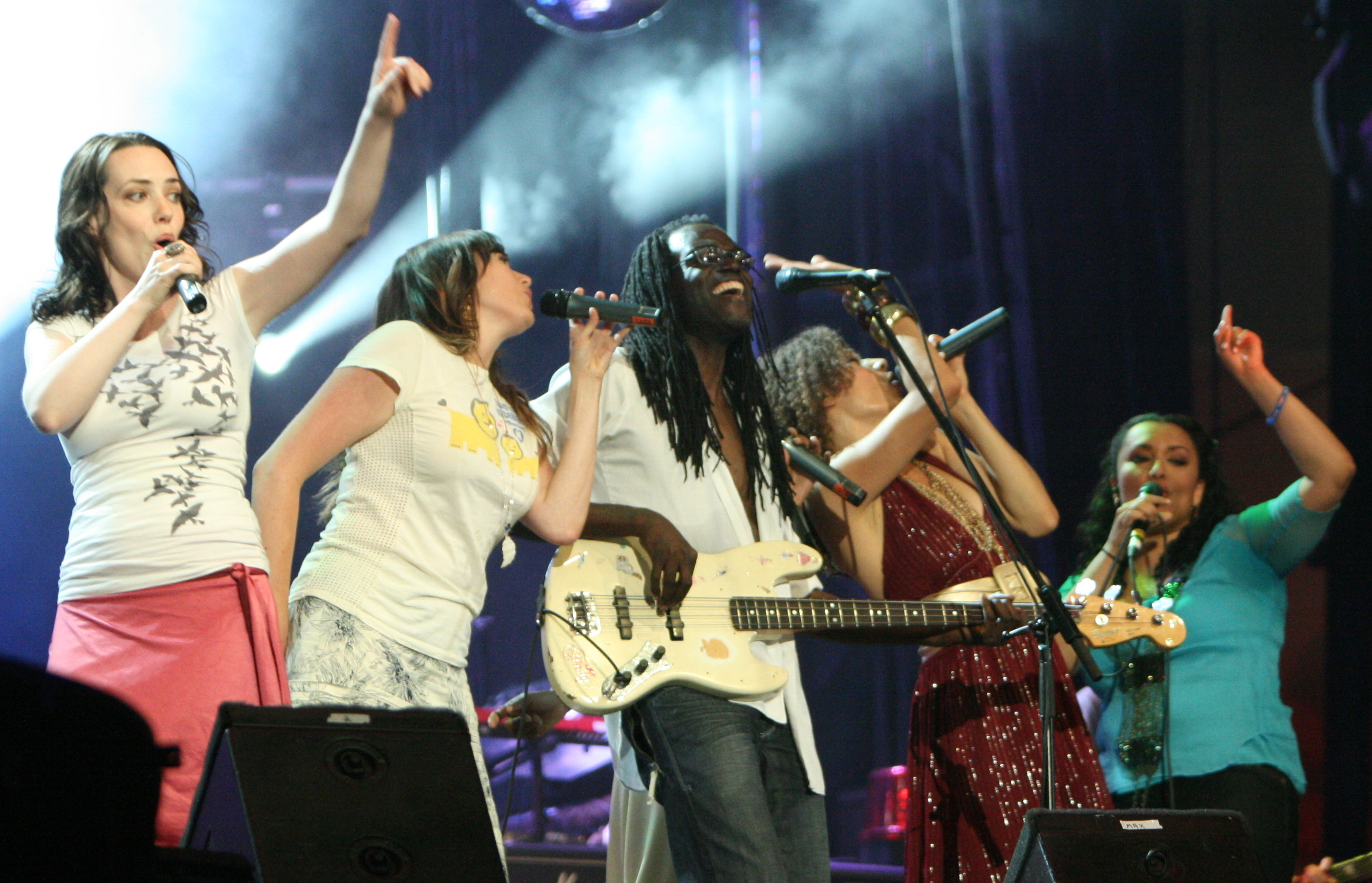
L–R: Jayne Hill, Sara Johnston, Gary McKenzi, Nick Hynes, Kim Bingham, Stéphane Moraille, at the Bran Van 3000 Concert @ Montreal Jazz Festival 2008

Bingham's next work, the full-length album UP!, was recorded in Los Angeles over the summer of 2010 with co-producer John Kastner (Doughboys, All Systems Go!) and with members of bands such as Queens of the Stone Age, Jellyfish, Blind Melon, and Masters of Reality. The album was released in May 2012 under Bingham's longstanding indie label, Mudgirl Music Group.

The stop-motion animation video for the single "UP!" won the Best Video award at the 2013 edition of the Independent Music Awards. The French version of "UP!" and the sole French single on the album, a song called "Party Girl", were once again radio hits for Bingham in French-speaking parts of Canada. In January 2019, "Bel Ami" was chosen as the theme song for the US television series Good Trouble. In the summer of 2019, Bingham released her first single, performed in both English and Italian, the upbeat pop song "Beppe Green".

== Style ==
According to The Spokesman-Review, Bingham "plays a musical style modeled after the eclectic pop of The The."

== Personal life ==
Bingham was raised in Montreal, Quebec, Canada, and presently lives in France.

== Awards ==
| Year | Award | Nominated work | Category | Result |
|---|---|---|---|---|
| 2007 | Prix Gémeaux | Les Invincibles | Best Original Score | Nominated |
| 2007 | Prix Gémeaux | "The Heroes Take" | Best Theme Song | Won |
| 2013 | Independent Music Awards | "Up!" | Best Short Form Video | Won |

== Discography ==
=== With Me Mom and Morgentaler ===
Albums

- 1991: Clown Heaven and Hell EP
- 1993: Shiva Space Machine
- 1994: We Are Revolting: Live & Obscure 1990–1994 (live)

=== Solo material ===
==== Albums ====
List of studio and live albums by Kim Bingham
| Year | Album title | Release details |
|---|---|---|
| 1996 | First Book EP by Mudgirl | Released: 1996; Label: Mudgirl Music Group; Format: CD, digital |
| 2001 | Girlology by The Kim Band | Released: 2001; Label: Mudgirl Music Group; Format: CD, digital |
| 2007 | Les Invincibles (Original Motion Picture Soundtrack) by Kim Bingham | Released: 5 June 2007; Label: Warner Music Canada; Format: CD, digital |
| 2007 | Intermede by Kim Bingham | Released: 27 August 2007; Label: Musik2Musik / Mudgirl Music; Format: CD, digital |
| 2012 | Up! by Kim Bingham | Released: 22 May 2012; Label: Mudgirl Music Group; Format: CD, digital |

==== Singles ====
Selected singles by Kim Bingham
| Year | Title | Album | Certifications |
|---|---|---|---|
| 1995 | "This Day" | First Book EP | |
| 1995 | "Adjusted" | First Book EP | |
| 1995 | "Contact" | First Book EP | |
| 2001 | "What a Drag!" | Girlology | No. 1 in Montreal |
| 2001 | "Valentine's Day" | Girlology | |
| 2001 | "Girlology" | Girlology | |
| 2003 | "Cœur de sable" | French single | Top 40 in Quebec |
| 2007 | "The Heroes Take" | Les Invincibles | Prix Gémeaux: Best Theme Song |
| 2008 | "Ticket pour l'amour" | French single | |
| 2012 | "Party Girl" | Promo single | |
| 2012 | "Up!" | Up! | |

=== TV scores ===
- 2005–09: Les Invincibles (Canada) – composer
- 2008–10: Les Invincibles (France-Germany) – composer
- 2019: Song "Bel Ami" used as theme music for Good Trouble (US) – composer

=== Guest appearances ===
Selected guest performances by Kim Bingham
| Year | Single name | Primary artist(s) | Album |
|---|---|---|---|
| 1999 | "Our Generation" (add. vocals by Bingham) | Marcy Playground | Shapeshifter |
| 2001 | "Black Black Heart" (ft. Kim Bingham) | David Usher | Morning Orbit |
| 2008 | Various tracks | Bran Van 3000 | Rosé |

== See also ==
- List of musicians from British Columbia
- List of Canadian musicians
