= Iron City Brewing Company =

Beer company located in Pennsylvania, US

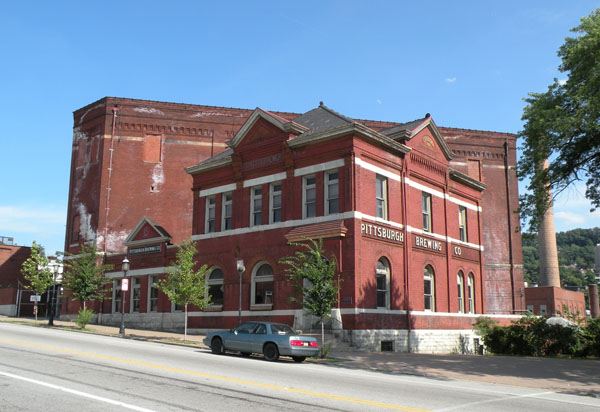
- Pittsburgh Brewing Company headquarters in the Lawrenceville neighborhood of Pittsburgh
- Interactive map of Iron City Brewing Company
- Location: 3340 Liberty Avenue, Pittsburgh, Pennsylvania
- Coordinates: 40.461822°N 79.965277°W
- Opened: 1861
- Annual production volume: 1.2 million US beer barrels (1,400,000 hl) (2004)
- Website: pittsburghbrewing.com

Active beers
Name	Type
Iron City Beer	American lager
I.C. Light	American light lager
I.C. Light Mango	Flavored light lager
Old German	American lager
Block House Brewing Pumpkin Ale	Pumpkin Ale
Block House Brewing Summer Break	Grapefruit-lemonade flavored lager
Block House Brewing Double Chocolate Bock	Chocolate-flavored lager
Pittsburgh Historic Designation
Type	Structure
Designated	April 16, 2010
Pittsburgh Landmark – PHLF
Designated	1979

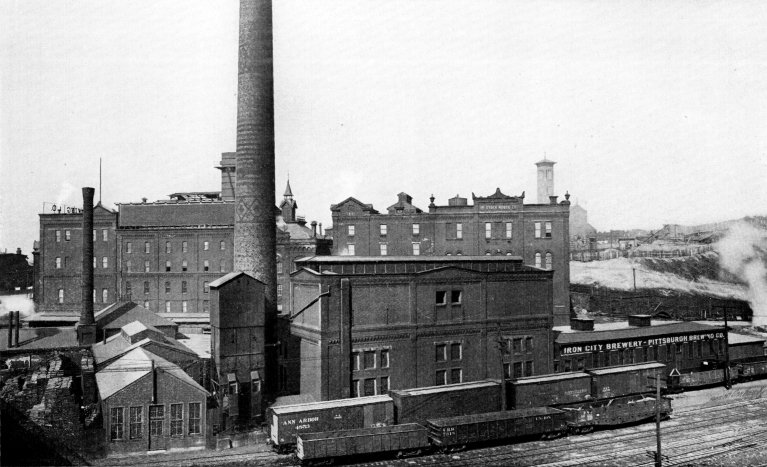
Iron City Brewery circa 1919

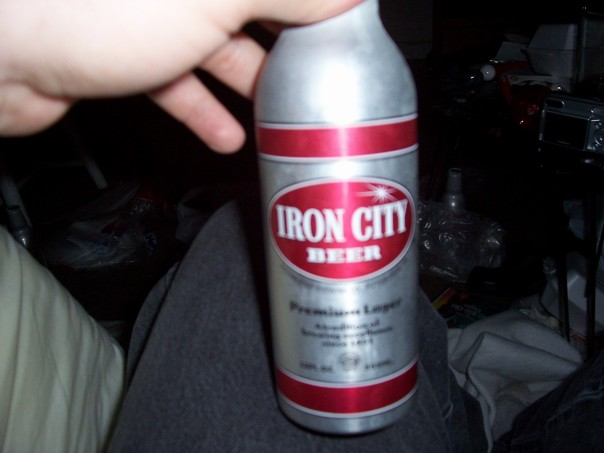
Distinctive Iron City space-bottle.

Pittsburgh Brewing Company (formerly known as Iron City Brewing Company) is a beer company headquartered in the Lawrenceville neighborhood of Pittsburgh, Pennsylvania, United States, best known for producing brands such as Iron City Beer, I.C. Light Beer, I.C. Light Mango, Old German, and Block House Brewing. Until August 2009, all production was conducted at its Lawrenceville facility. From August 2009 to 2021, their products were contract brewed at City Brewing Company in the facility that once produced Rolling Rock. On February 4, 2021, Iron City Beer's Instagram account announced that Pittsburgh Brewing Company would resume production of its own product in a new production brewery in Creighton, Pennsylvania, in the original Pittsburgh Plate Glass Company plant. At its opening, the facility is capable of producing 150,000 BBLs of beer annually.

== History ==
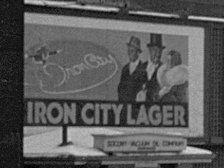
Billboard in Pittsburgh, 1936

In 1861, a young German immigrant, Edward Frauenheim, started the Iron City Brewery, one of the first American breweries to produce a lager, in the bustling river port known at the time as the "Smoky City". This founder of Frauenheim, Miller & Company started brewing Iron City Beer, now the flagship of the Iron City Brewing Company (PBC), in a city thriving on heavy industry and commerce.

By 1866, the brewery had begun to grow. The business outgrew its original facilities on 17th Street and moved into a four-story brick building that the company built at Liberty Avenue and 34th Street, then worth an estimated $250,000. Just three years later, Iron City Brewery erected an additional three-story building at the site.

The two buildings, carrying an average stock of about 10,000 barrels, used state-of-the-art brewing equipment. At the time, 25 of the operation's 30 skilled workmen were employed full-time, and Iron City Brewery continued to expand its markets to become the largest brewery in Pittsburgh.

Old German label

After the 1866 expansion, Leopold Vilsack, a Pittsburgh native who learned the brewer's trade at Pittsburgh's old Bennett Brewery, joined Frauenheim, Miller & Company. The young man later became a partner, investing his small wealth in the firm when Miller retired and another partner died. Iron City Brewery then became Frauenheim and Vilsack Company.

Frauenheim and Vilsack became well known throughout the American brewing industry because they had established one of the largest and most fully equipped breweries in the country. With an annual capacity of about 50,000 barrels, the Iron City Brewery operated on a scale that allowed it to compete in sales volume with any brewery west of the Atlantic Coast. Historians and newspapers documented the large size of the facility. At the time, the company's total valuation, from stock to raw materials, was about $150,000.

Leopold Vilsack (born Sebold Vilsack; the son of Alsatian immigrants) amassed considerable wealth from his involvement in the brewing industry (and from his ventures in other industries, including real estate, insurance, and banking). He became a prominent local philanthropist, donating money to Pittsburgh's St. Paul Cathedral and providing financial aid to victims of the Johnstown Flood of 1889. Remembered as a "staunch Democrat", he had an interest in politics though never ran for office. Vilsack died in 1907.

By 1886, the Iron City Brewery had about 500 large reception casks, each of which held 45 to 50 barrels of beer. And, the brewery had about 10,000 kegs in constant use.

=== Regional trust ===
During the latter part of the 19th century, trusts became the business vogue, and industries began to merge or form trusts to achieve stability through size and take advantage of economies of scale. The brewing industry was no exception.

On February 3, 1899, the Pittsburgh Dispatch reported that 12 local brewing firms applied to transfer their license to the trust known as Pittsburgh Brewing Company: Wainwright Brewing Company, Phoenix Brewing Company, Keystone Brewing Company, Winter Brothers Brewing Company, Phillip Lauer, John H. Nusser, Ebhardt & Ober Brewing Company, Hippely & Sons, Ober Brewing Company, J. Seiferth Brothers, Straub Brewing Company, and the Iron City Brewing Company.

In addition to these 12 Pittsburgh and Allegheny County breweries, nine breweries outside the county took part in the merger. In all, 21 breweries joined to make Pittsburgh Brewing Company the largest brewing operation in Pennsylvania and the third largest in the country. The combined facilities, worth about $11 million, provided a capacity of more than one million barrels. Greater efficiencies and more modern equipment made it practical to close many of the 21 breweries shortly after the incorporation without relinquishing capacities.

Prohibition, starting in 1920, forced many breweries, distillers and taverns to close, yet Pittsburgh Brewing Company survived. One of only 725 American breweries left when the movement was repealed in April 1933, PBC produced soft drinks, ice cream and 'near beer' and ran a cold storage business to endure those years. The brewery's creative efforts kept alive a Pittsburgh tradition and foreshadowed future innovations that would again restore security in times of struggle.

=== Post-prohibition ===
Soon after prohibition came to a close in the 1930s, the brewery was in search of a qualified brewmaster to help rebuild the business which thrived before prohibition laws were put into place. During prohibition, a local who was producing his own spirits had established relationships with some executives at the brewery. Soon after the close of prohibition, this led to his son being able to attain the position of brew master at Iron City brewing. Skills which had been learned while working with his father helped him catapult to the position. Quality over quantity was paramount to them and this carried well to those restarting production of alcohol at the brewery. Peter Zugel remained at the brewery as brew master until his retirement in 1973.

In the 1970s, the Pittsburgh Brewing Company acquired the Queen City Brewing Company (1901–1976) of Cumberland, Maryland. The Queen City Brewing Company was also known as the Old German Brewing Company and included the Cumberland Brewing Company (1890–1958), which was purchased by the brewery in 1958. At its peak, the Queen City brewery produced over 250,000 barrels of beer a year in Cumberland. The company prospered during the 1950s and 1960s; however, labor disputes and declining sales caused the Queen City Brewing Company to close in December 1974, transferring its Old German, Old Export, Heritage House, Old Dutch, Brown Derby, Gamecock Ale, and American brands to the Pittsburgh Brewing Company. The Queen City brewery was demolished in April 1975, ending a combined 152 years of brewing in Cumberland, Maryland. In January, 1974, the Pittsburgh Brewing Company acquired the Augustiner, Mark V, Robin Hood and Gambrinus brand names from August Wagner Breweries, Inc., Columbus, Ohio.

Cumberland Brewing Company motif

By 1977, Pittsburgh Brewing Company was one of just 49 breweries left in the U.S.A. To rebound from difficult years, the brewery introduced a new light beer, Iron City Light — or IC Light. IC Light's aggressive marketing campaign targeted the young beer drinker. Both men and women enjoyed the new beer, which quickly captured 80 percent of the local light-beer market. IC Light's popularity apparently also heightened the sales of regular Iron City beer, as it regained the position of southwestern Pennsylvania's favorite beer.

In 1986, Pittsburgh Brewing Company was acquired and merged with Alan Bond's Bond Brewing Holdings Ltd. of Perth, Western Australia, and two years later he integrated Pittsburgh Brewing into the structure of its corporate sister, G. Heileman Brewing Company. They were again separated in 1991 when A. Bond, suffering financially, sold Heileman, and he gave up the Pittsburgh brewery the next year to western Pennsylvania entrepreneur Michael Carlow, who made it a subsidiary of his Pittsburgh Food & Beverage Company.

When Carlow was forced to relinquish control of the brewery because of PNC Bank's allegations of fraud that would lead to his imprisonment, Pittsburgh native Joseph Piccirilli gained ownership of the brewery. The investment group J. Piccirilli represented, Keystone Brewing Company, closed the $29.4 million purchase September 12, 1995, at a hearing in U.S. bankruptcy court, showing a new commitment to Pittsburgh Brewing Company's products.

Piccirilli was dedicated to moving the brewery into the 21st century. He prompted many new ideas, most notably the aluminum bottle. However, the company struggled with labor issues and a sharp decline in sales. (PBC had been hovering around the 1 million barrel production mark, even through rough financial times). After producing fewer than 400,000 barrels in 2005, the company filed for Chapter 11 bankruptcy.

=== Brand relaunch ===
In 2007, the brewery was purchased and brought out of bankruptcy by Unified Growth Partners. They returned the brewery to its original name, "Iron City Brewing Company", and planned a rebound to full production.

In May 2009, Iron City Brewing signed a deal with the City Brewing Company to begin use the former Rolling Rock Latrobe Brewing Company's plant, with brewing started in June and bottling/kegging production resumed in July 2009.

In 2018 Rosebud Mining purchased "Pittsburgh Brewing" the company brewing Iron City Beer. Acquiring the old facility in Lawrenceville, with plans to rebuild the blockhouse to former glory. Construction began in 2019, bringing the copper trimmed building back to life.

As of 2023, production of beer has begun in the former PPG Industries Works 1 in Creighton, Pa. The plant closed in August, 2018 and was taken over by Rosebud. In addition, a distillery is now in operation on the same site.

== Products ==
Iron City Brewing Company's most popular products are Iron City Beer (a macro-style lager) and IC Light. PBC also produces American, American Light, Old German, and Blockhouse Brands (their craft beer line). In June 2011, IC Light Mango was launched. PBC introduced a higher ABV version on their Mango product (IC Pumped Mango 8.0%), IC Light Twist Cherry, and IC Light Twist Lime Coconut in the summer of 2019.

Iron City Brewing formerly held the rights for Wiedemann beer.

Iron City also brewed Samuel Adams beers under contract for the Boston Beer Company during the early years of that brewery.

== Gallery ==
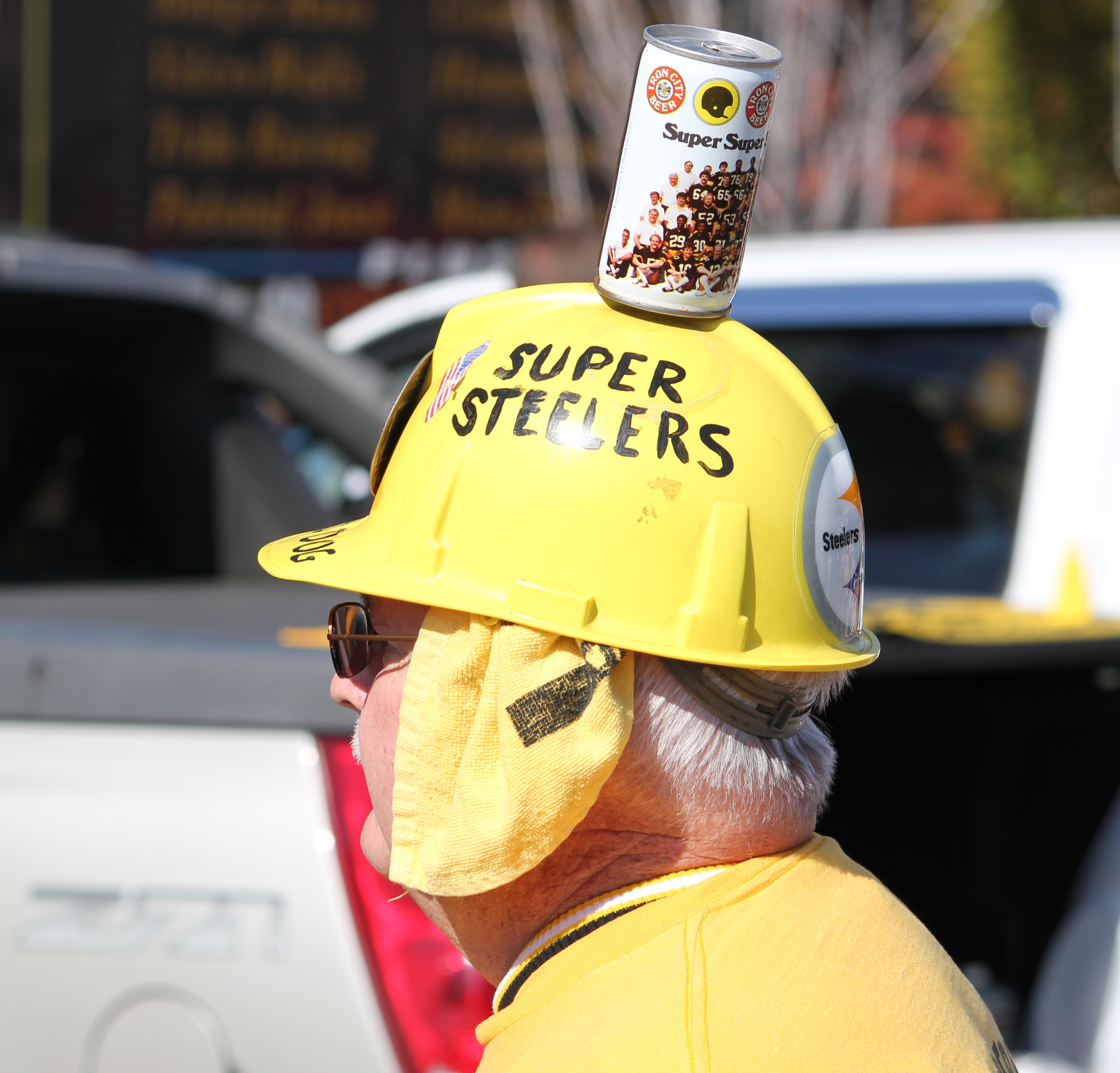
A Pittsburgh Steelers fan with a can of Iron City on his head

Circa 1895 embossed bottle

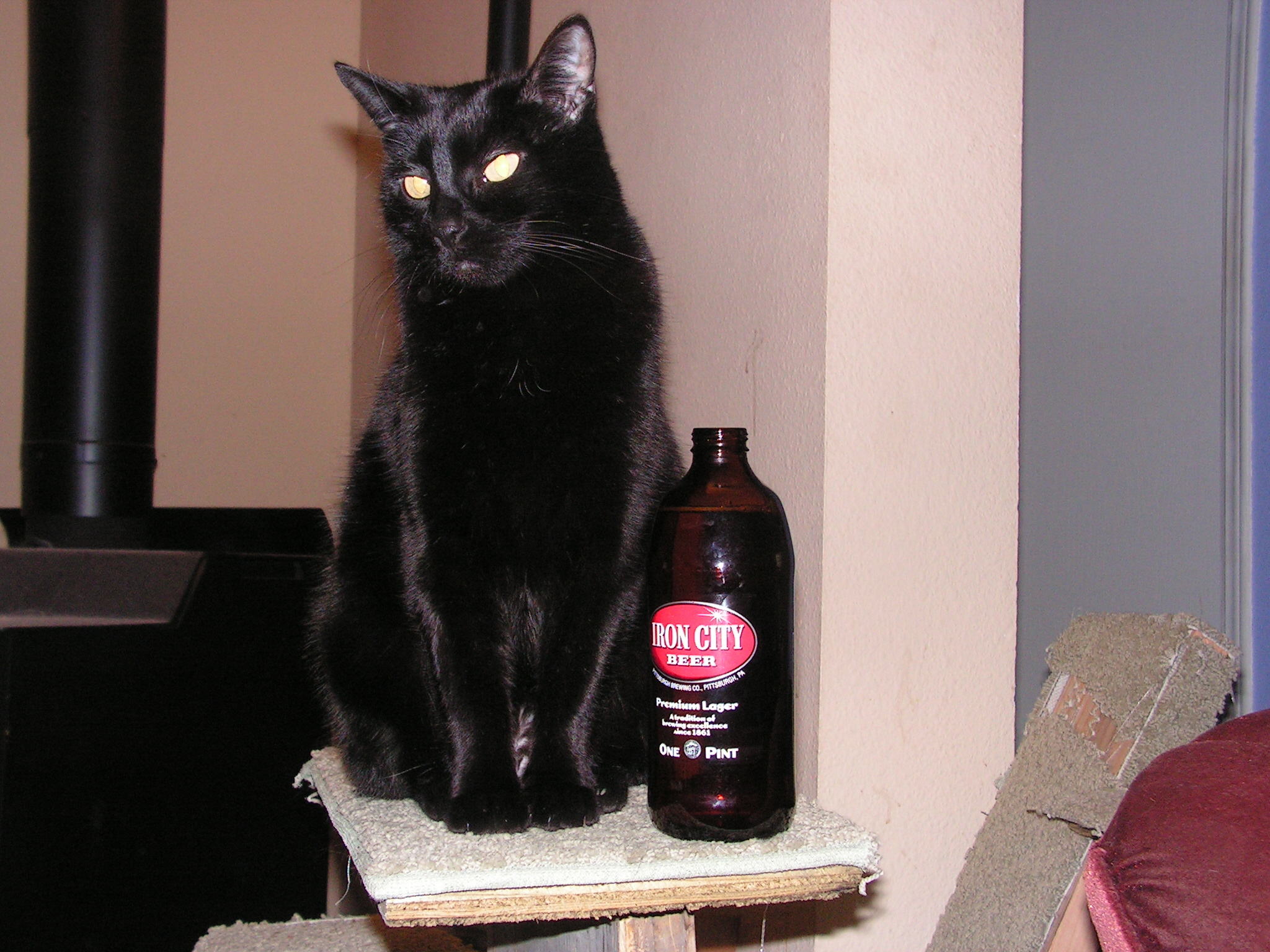
A current pint-bottle of Iron City, accompanied by a cat

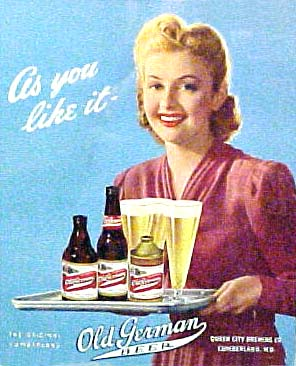
An Old German poster

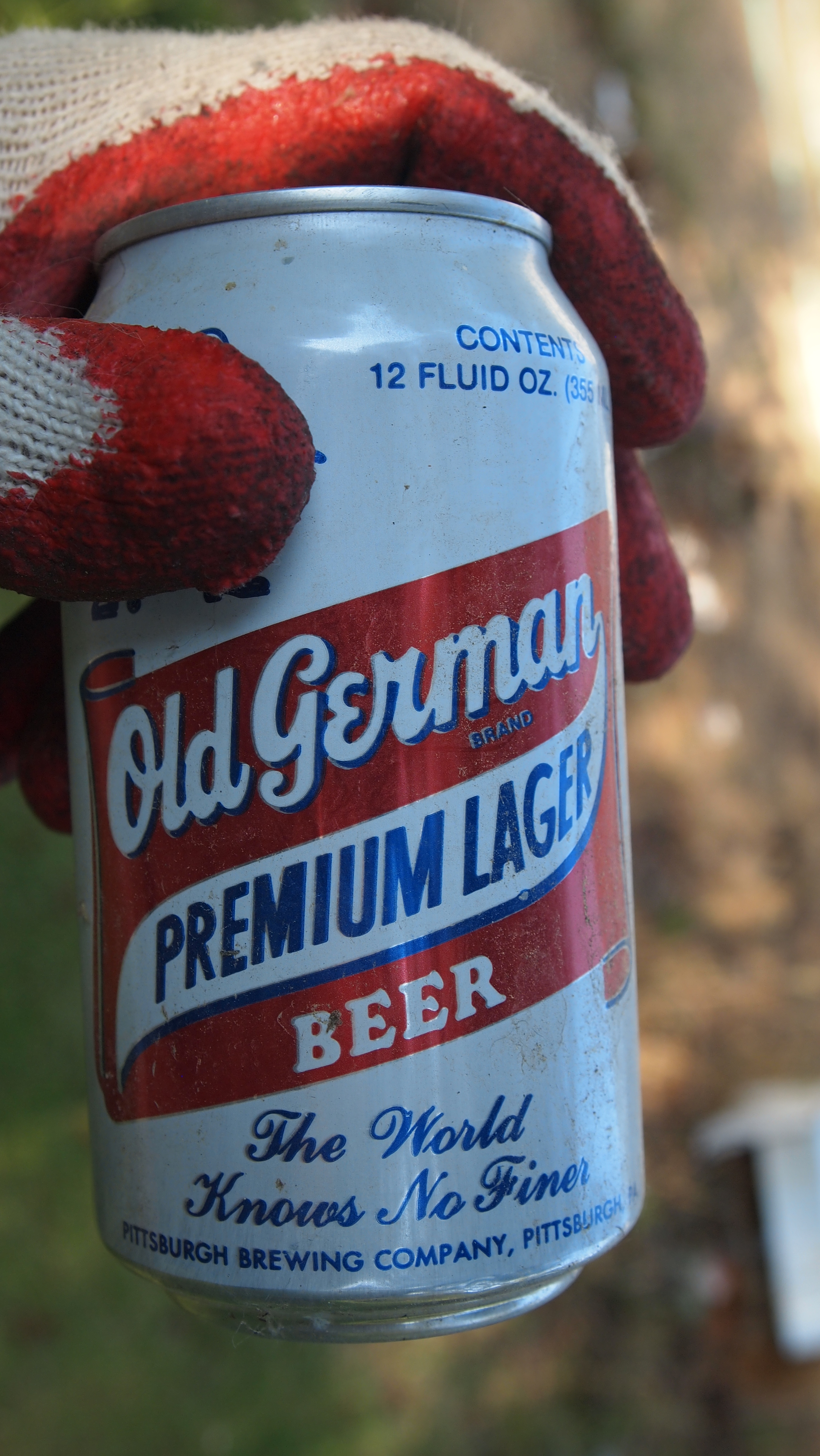
A can of Old German bearing the former address of Pittsburgh Brewing

== Innovations ==
- First snap-top can, produced in conjunction with Alcoa, 1962.
- First twist-off resealable cap, 1963.
- First brewery to print scenes honoring local sports teams and individuals.
- First "draught" beer available in a can, Iron City Draft.
- First malt cooler, Hop-n-Gator (sued for trademark infringement by Gatorade and ceased production).
- First brewer to use the aluminum beer bottle on a large scale, produced in conjunction with Alcoa, 2005. According to Alcoa, the bottle has three times the aluminum of typical cans, giving it better insulation. The maker claims the bottle keeps beer cold up to 50 minutes longer. It is also lighter than glass, unbreakable, resealable, and is coated to prevent the aluminum from affecting the taste.
