= Bran Van 3000 =

Canadian music group

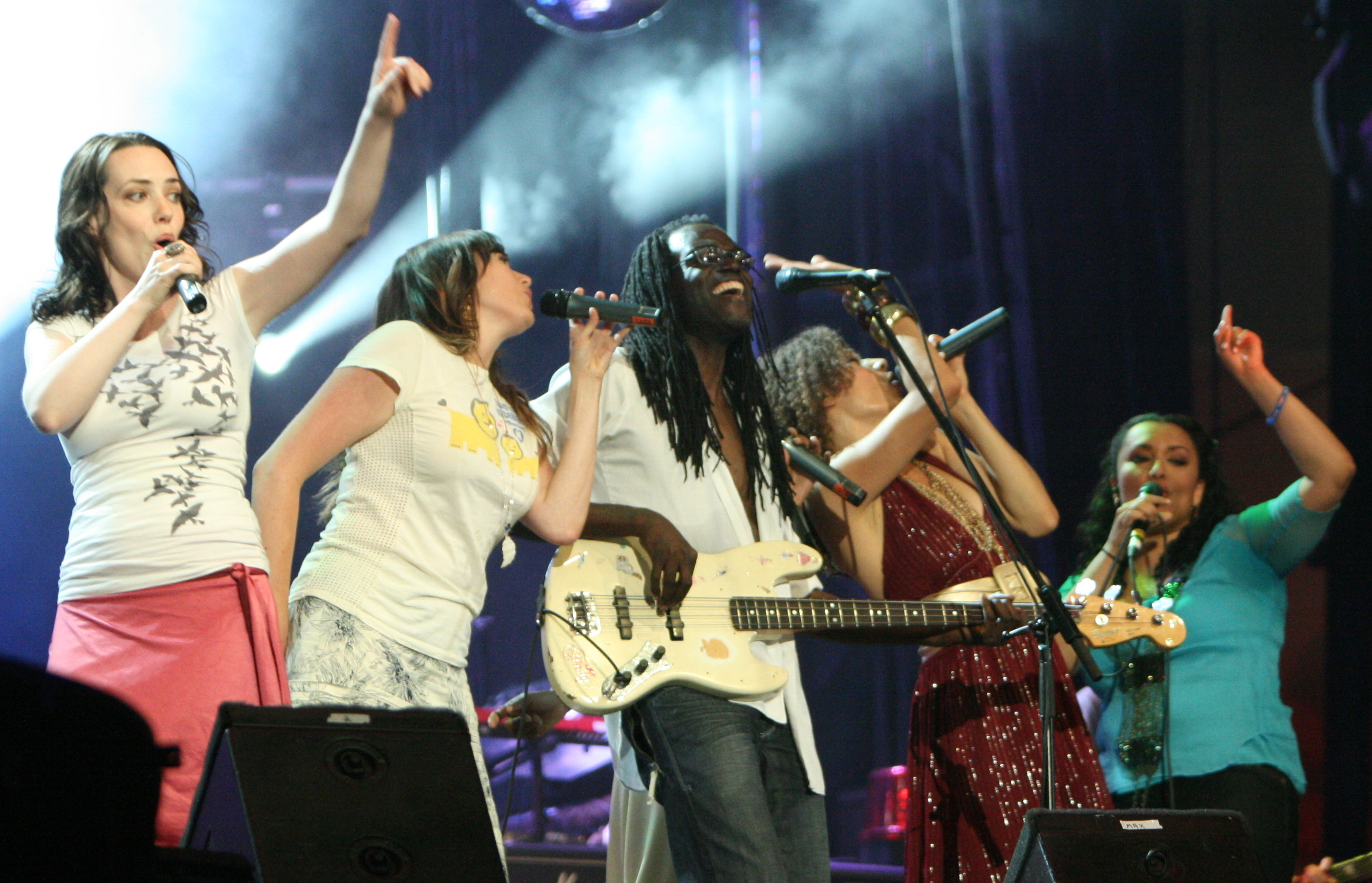
- Jayne Hill, Sara Johnston, Gary McKenzi, Kim Bingham & Stephane Moraille Taken at the Bran Van 3000 Concert @ Montreal Jazz Festival 2008, Place des Arts, Montreal, Quebec, Canada on July 1, 2008

Background information
- Origin: Montreal, Quebec, Canada
- Genres: Alternative dance; neo soul; trip hop
- Years active: 1996–2002; 2006–present
- Labels: Audiogram, Virgin Records, Capitol Records, Grand Royal, Remstar Interaction, Productions Root Boogie
- Members: James Di Salvio; E.P. Bergen
- Website: Bran Van 3000 (defunct)

Bran Van 3000 (also known as BV3) is a Canadian alternative rock and hip hop collective from Montreal, Quebec. Founded by James Di Salvio and E.P. Bergen, they collaborated on a number of songs with Stéphane Moraille, Sara Johnston, Steve "Liquid" Hawley, Jayne Hill, Jean Leloup, Kim Bingham, Pierre-Luc Cerat and many other musicians.

The name of the group is derived etymologically from Swedish liquor brännvin, a general term referring to any type of distilled spirit. The name originated as a joke associated with the taupe-coloured Volkswagen Camper Van owned by Bergen in the mid-1990s which was said to run solely on bran flakes, brännvin and brand recognition when carrying the artists on tour around Canada.

Between 1996 and 2016, Bran Van 3000 was among the Top 150 selling Canadian artists in Canada.

== History ==
=== 1994–1996: Formation ===
In 1994, James Di Salvio had received a royalty cheque for work on a remix he had done on a track for Quebec songwriter Jean Leloup, and invited his friend E.P. Bergen to "come help him spend the money" in New York. Di Salvio was a video director and asked E.P. to teach him how to produce tracks with a sampler and turntables; in the process, they created Bran Van 3000. E.P. returned to Montreal and co-wrote/produced a single with Leloup called "Johnny Go"; E.P. invited James to record his first ever rap on that song. It later went to number one on the Quebec charts. Di Salvio also directed the music video.

James and E.P. went back to New York to record "Forest" and "La Chambre" for Leloup's album Le Dôme. These tracks were very successful (the album went platinum); for BV3, this led to a record deal with Audiogram Records. Together with Haig V, they co-produced the first BV3 album, for which Leloup donated the song "Forest". Bergen started a cover of "Cum On Feel the Noize" with plans to have Sara Johnston sing on it, but Di Salvio discovered Steve "Liquid" Hawley. In 1996, when the album was almost finished, James and E.P. sent a demo of the songs "Drinking In LA", "Couch Surfer" and "Everywhere" to the Canadian Music Week contest. Bran Van 3000 tied for first place with Jack Rustle, but was disqualified because there was no real band to perform the showcase. They finished the album and put together a touring band that included Gary Mackenzie, Nick Hynes, and Rob Joanisse.

=== 1996–1999: Glee ===
Bran Van 3000 finally released their first single, "Drinking in L.A.", in February 1997 in Canada. It peaked at number 35 on Canada's RPM Top Singles chart on July 28. In April of that year, the band released their first album, Glee. The record went gold and at the Juno Awards of 1998, won a Juno Award for Best Alternative Album. BV3 was nominated for Best New Group and "Drinking in L.A." was nominated for Single of the Year. Glee contained 17 tracks, with "Forest" in French and featuring Leloup. "Afrodiziak", produced by E.P. Bergen sold 100,000 copies in Germany and appeared in the movie XChange. The song "Everywhere" was featured on the soundtrack to the film Practical Magic and "Drinking in L.A." was featured in the soundtrack to Playing by Heart. "Ceci n'est pas une chanson" (later "Une chanson") contains the main melody of "Perfect", a song from The The.

In March 1998, Glee was released internationally, albeit with some changes: "Ceci n'est pas une chanson" became an instrumental simply called "Une chanson"; the French song, "Forest", was reworked with several English verses. The international version has 19 tracks. Previously unreleased songs were "Rainshine", "Carry On", and "Old School".

After signing with Capitol Records, Bran Van 3000 began a massive touring schedule. It started across Canada, then zigzagged across the United States. The played the H.O.R.D.E. festival, Endfest; in Europe, they opened for Massive Attack, Björk and Pulp and, back in Quebec, for Moby.

In May 1998, "Drinking in L.A." reached number 34 in the UK Singles Chart, becoming their first transatlantic hit. In August 1999, the single was re-released after the song was featured in a popular TV commercial for Rolling Rock and peaked at number 3 in the UK.

=== 2000–2002: Discosis ===
In the summer of 2001, Bran Van 3000 released the album Discosis. The song "Astounded" featured the final recorded performance from soul legend Curtis Mayfield and became the most successful Canadian single by the collective, reaching number 3 on the Canadian Singles Chart. Other collaborators on the album were Senegalese singer Youssou N'Dour and reggae artist Eek-a-Mouse. The song "Go Shopping" was featured on the soundtrack to the Mexican film Y Tu Mamá También. A remix of the song "The Answer" was done by the Latch Brothers and was featured in the 2002 video game, Jet Set Radio Future.

=== 2006–2007: Rosé ===
BV3's third album, Rosé, was released in Canada on October 30 and in the US on November 27, 2007. Rosé was co-produced by James Di Salvio and Sara Johnston with the collaboration of Fatlip, Max-A-Million, Swanza, Chris Opperman, Noel Osborne and others. The album was written in Los Angeles and was recorded at Depeche Mode's studio and in Hollywood at Steve Vai's Studio. On July 1, 2008, the original group got back together to perform at the Montreal International Jazz Festival, in front of a crowd numbering around 180,000.

=== 2010–2012: The Garden ===
After the death of his friend and father, Bobby Di Salvio, James got the collective back together. The album The Garden was released on October 19, 2010.

Di Salvio and parts of the group then toured through Canada, collaborating with different singers and instrumentalists like Pierre-Luc Cérat, Nick Hynes, Pascal Lepage and Stéphane Moraille. In 2015, they released the album French Garden.

On May 3, 2022, on its Facebook page, Bran Van 3000 announced an upcoming 25th anniversary tour of Canada, the US, the UK and Europe.

== Discography ==
=== Studio albums ===
Title	Details	Peak chart positions						Certifications (sales threshold)
Title	Details	CAN	AUT	BEL	FRA	GER	UK	Certifications (sales threshold)
Glee	Release date: April 15, 1997; Label: Audiogram, Capitol/EMI; Formats: CD	59	15	—	120	96	77	MC: Gold
Discosis	Release date: May 29, 2001; Label: Grand Royal/Virgin/EMI; Formats: CD	5	15	38	89	49	97	
Rosé	Release date: October 30, 2007; Label: Remstar; Formats: CD, music download	9	—	—	—	—	—	
The Garden	Release date: October 19, 2010; Label: Audiogram; Formats: CD, music download	15	—	—	—	—	—	
French Garden	Release date: March 2, 2015; Label: Productions Root Boogie; Formats: CD, Album		—	—	—	—	—	
"—" denotes releases that did not chart

=== Compilation albums ===
Title	Album details
Greatest Hits	Released: 2014; Label: Audiogram; Formats: CD, MP3

=== Singles ===
Title	Year	Peak chart positions						Album
Title	Year	CAN	AUS	NLD	SWE	UK	US Dance	Album
"Drinking in L.A."	1997	35	79	46	9	3	—	Glee
"Couch Surfer"	1997	—	—	—	—	—	—	Glee
"Everywhere"	1998	12	—	—	—	—	—	Glee
"Exactly Like Me"	1998	—	—	—	—	—	—	Glee
"Afrodiziak" / "Forest" (French version)	1999	—	—	—	25	—	—	Glee
"Astounded"	2001	3	—	72	49	40	35	Discosis
"The Answer"	2001	—	—	—	—	—	—	Discosis
"Love Cliché"	2001	28	—	—	—	—	—	Discosis
"Forever"	2006	—	—	—	—	—	—	Rosé
"Call Me (I'll Be Around)"	2007	50	—	—	—	—	—	Rosé
"Grace (Love on the Block)"	2010	—	—	—	—	—	—	The Garden
"Jahrusalem"	2010	—	—	—	—	—	—	The Garden
"La Dolce Vita" (Fred Everything Remixes)	2011	—	—	—	—	—	—	

== Soundtrack credits ==
- Playing by Heart (1998), "Drinking in LA", "Exactly Like Me"
- Practical Magic (1998), "Everywhere"
- Entropy (1999), "Drinking in L.A."
- Y tu mamá también (2001), "Go Shopping"
- Xchange (2001), "Afrodiziak"
- Skeppsholmen (TV Series) (2002), "Astounded"
- Jet Set Radio Future (2002), "The Answer"
- Everwood (2004), "Rock Star"
- FIFA Street 2 (2006), "Astounded"
- The L Word (2008), "Loaded", "Rock Star"
- The Trotsky (2009), "Shine"
- Bon Cop, Bad Cop 2 (2017), "Black Diamond", "Girlz"
- The Curse of Von Dutch: A Brand to Die For (TV Series) (2021), "Cum On Feel the Noize"
- Aftersun (2022), "Drinking in LA"

== See also ==
- List of bands from Canada
- Music of Quebec
