= Astounded =

Astounded may refer to:

- "Astounded" (Bran Van 3000 song), 2001
- "Astounded" (Tantric song), 2001

== See also ==
- Astonishment, or surprise, a human emotion
