= World's Largest Six-Pack =

Public art in Wisconsin

- Artist: G. Heileman Brewing Company
- Year: 1969
- Medium: Steel
- Dimensions: 54 ft (16 m) tall
- Location: 43.8028°N 91.2533°W

The World's Largest Six-Pack is a large collection of six beer storage tanks in La Crosse, Wisconsin. It is a well-known landmark and tourist attraction in the city. The cans can collectively hold about 688,200 US gal (2,605,000 L) of beer.

== History ==
The G. Heileman Brewing Company built the structure in 1969 to hold excess beer from its factory. They were painted in 1970 to provide advertising for the company and to symbolize the brewery's headquarters and flagship brand. The City Brewing Company took control of the factory and tanks in 1999 following the company's closure in 1996. The company painted the tanks completely white in 2000 until four of the six were plastic-wrapped with vinyl beer covers in 2003. The sculpture was rewrapped in its former packaging 2023 after the Old Style beer was announced to begin production in La Crosse again.

== Urban legends ==
There is a rumor that students of the University of Wisconsin–Madison once attempted to tap the beer cans using an axe and nearly flooded the nearby street.
