= Drinking in L.A. =

1997 single by Bran Van 3000

Single by Bran Van 3000

from the album Glee
- Released: February 1997
- Length: 3:56
- Label: Audiogram; Capitol
- Songwriters: James Di Salvio; Norman Larson; Haig Vartzbedian
- Producer: Haig V.

Bran Van 3000 singles chronology
"Drinking in L.A." (1997)	"Couch Surfer" (1998)

Music video
- "Drinking in L.A." on YouTube

"Drinking in L.A." is a song by Canadian electronica collective Bran Van 3000, released as the band's debut single in 1997 by Audiogram and Capitol. It was the last song to be recorded for the band's debut studio album, Glee (1997). Of the song, James Di Salvio has said "It was almost like one of those movies where an animated blue bird swings by over the real live footage. It's cheesy, but I knew in my heart it was a hit." The chorus of the song was provided by the Haitian-born singer Stéphane Moraille; she later recalled that when the song became a hit in the US and UK, she was excluded from the group's press and promotional tour.

"Drinking in L.A." was featured in television commercials for Rolling Rock beer in the United Kingdom, which contributed to its chart success there, peaking at number three on the UK Singles Chart in August 1999. It also reached the top 10 in Iceland, Italy, Norway and Sweden, as well as number 35 in the band's native Canada. The music video for the song was directed by Adam Courneya.

== Background ==
After a heavy night of drinking, James Di Salvio woke up face-down on a lawn in West Hollywood. With a serious headache, he asked himself: "What the hell am I doing, drinking in L.A.?"

== Critical reception ==
Stephen Thomas Erlewine from AllMusic felt that Bran Van 3000 is a "bizarre, stylish mix of club music, techno, hip-hop, lounge and kitsch-pop", adding that the song is "great". Chuck Taylor from Billboard described it as an "atmospheric gem" and "terrifically quirky, with a more or less spoken verse accompanied by a chorale of dreamy background vocals, catcalls, and eerie sounds both sung and spoken and coming at you from all sides." He said "there's a hook there, too, as rich and textured as any more clearly defined pop offering. Instrumentally, you couldn't ask for more, with trancy lo fi production". He also complimented it as "glorious and deliciously creative". Scottish Daily Record noted its "slacker hip-hop and brilliant vocals". Music Week complimented it as a "laid back, funky track combining rich vocals of soul diva Maraille [sic] and the Beck-like lazy drawl of James Di Salvio." Stuart Bailie from NME commented, "At least 'Drinking In LA' has a point of sorts, a development on the lotus-eater myth. Only now are the hedonists sobering up on Venice Beach, California, troubled by an imminent career crisis. Nice tune, too." A reviewer from Sunday Mirror gave it nine out of ten, declaring it as "one of those oh so wacky tunes that creep under your summer skin and won't budge. Sounds like Beck and will be huge."

== Music video ==
The accompanying music video for the song was directed by Adam Courneya. Ilana Kronick from The Gazette wrote, "In short, the clip for Drinking in L.A. is a visual representation of Bran Van's electro-pop cross-breeding. A veritable bouillabaisse of teched-out trends, digi-rock references and clubby stylings, the video — much like the group — is a trip through the '90s cool pop standards." The video won a MuchMusic Video Award for "Best Dance Video".

== Track listings ==
- US maxi-CD single and UK CD re-release
1. "Drinking in L.A." (edit) – 3:34
2. "Drinking in L.A." (Fink mix) – 5:36
3. "Drinking in L.A." (Zoobone mix) – 3:56
- UK original CD single
1. "Drinking in L.A." (edit) – 3:34
2. "The Problem with Sheldon" – 1:23
3. "Drinking in L.A." (Fink mix) – 5:36
4. "Drinking in L.A." (Zoobone mix) – 3:56
- UK cassette single
1. "Drinking in L.A." (edit) – 3:34
2. "The Problem with Sheldon" – 1:23
3. "Drinking in L.A." (Fink mix) – 5:37
- European and Australian maxi-CD single
1. "Drinking in L.A." (edit) – 3:34
2. "Thinking in L.A." – 5:42
3. "Drinking in L.A." (Fink mix) – 5:36
4. "Drinking in L.A." (album version) – 3:56

== Charts ==
=== Weekly charts ===
Chart (1997–1999)	Peak position
Australia (ARIA)	79
Belgium (Ultratop 50 Flanders)	40
Canada Top Singles (RPM)	35
Canada CHR/Top 40 (BDS)	28
Denmark (IFPI)	15
Europe (Eurochart Hot 100)	17
Iceland (Íslenski listinn topp 40)	3
Ireland (IRMA)	14
Italy (Musica e dischi)	8
Italy Airplay (Music & Media)	3
Netherlands (Dutch Top 40 Tipparade)	2
Netherlands (Single Top 100)	46
New Zealand (Recorded Music NZ)	30
Norway (VG-lista)	7
Scottish Singles Sales (Official Charts)	2
Sweden (Sverigetopplistan)	9
UK Singles (Official Charts)	3

=== Year-end charts ===
Chart (1998)	Position
Iceland (Íslenski Listinn Topp 40)	80
Sweden (Hitlistan)	89

Chart (1999)	Position
UK Singles (OCC)	70
UK Airplay (Music Week)	47

== Certifications ==
Region	Certification	Certified units/sales
United Kingdom (BPI)	Gold	400,000^{‡}
^{‡} Sales+streaming figures based on certification alone.

== Release history ==
Region	Date	Format(s)	Label(s)	Ref.
Canada	February 1997	Radio	Audiogram	
United States	January 26, 1998	Modern rock radio	Capitol	
United Kingdom	May 18, 1998	7-inch vinyl; CD; cassette	Audiogram; Capitol	
United States	August 25, 1998	Contemporary hit radio	Capitol	
United Kingdom (re-release)	August 9, 1999	CD; cassette	Audiogram; Capitol	
