= Latrobe Brewing Company =

Company founded in Latrobe, Pennsylvania

Coordinates: 40.3195°N 79.3902°W

- Latrobe Brewing Company viewed from Ligonier Street
- Location: Latrobe, Pennsylvania; United States
- Opened: 1893
- Owner: City Brewing Company

Latrobe Brewing Company is a brewery founded in 1893 in Latrobe, Pennsylvania, once famous for producing Rolling Rock American lager beer. The brand was acquired by Labatt Brewing Company in 1987, itself acquired in 1995 by the Belgian brewing conglomerate Interbrew, which merged into InBev in 2004. In 2006 Anheuser-Busch purchased the Rolling Rock brand, but not the brewery. After briefly brewing the beer in Latrobe it relocated production to Newark, New Jersey.

In 2006, City Brewing Company acquired the brewery, and has brewed a variety of beers on and off there ever since.

== History ==
=== Early history and production of Rolling Rock ===
The Latrobe Brewing Company brewery was founded in 1893 in Latrobe, Pennsylvania, as part of the Pittsburgh Brewing Company. Forced to close in 1920 due to Prohibition, it was purchased by the Tito brothers and reopened in 1933 selling “Latrobe Old German” and “Latrobe Pilsner” beers. Rolling Rock brand beer (famous for its green "pony bottles"), was introduced in 1939, leading to Latrobe becoming one of the largest brewers in the United States.

It was purchased by Labatt Brewing Company in 1987, which in turn was purchased in 1995 by the Belgian brewing conglomerate Interbrew, which merged into InBev in 2004, then Anheuser-Busch InBev following a 2008 merger with Anheuser-Busch.

In May 2006, InBev had announced that it was selling the Rolling Rock brands to Anheuser-Busch, (brewer of Budweiser), the largest brewer in the United States. This sale, however, excluded the Latrobe brewery, leaving an uncertain future for the Latrobe brewery, which only continued producing the Rolling Rock Brands through July 31, when production was moved to an Anheuser-Busch facility in Newark, New Jersey.

=== Operation by City Brewing Company ===
On June 21, 2006, InBev signed a letter of intent with City Brewing Company from La Crosse, Wisconsin, "giving it exclusive rights for an undetermined time to negotiate a purchase of the plant." City Brewing currently operates the historic G. Heileman Brewery in La Crosse. However, with the sale of the plant still in limbo, the Latrobe Brewing Company plant officially shut down on July 31, 2006, and the plant sat idle.

In September 2006, City Brewing Company agreed to purchase the brewery.

In March 2007, the brewery reopened its doors and produced Samuel Adams Boston Lager under an agreement between City Brewing and the Boston Beer Company. The Boston Beer Company pledged $3–7 million to upgrade the plant. It was estimated that 200,000 to 250,000 barrels of beer would be produced in the plant during the remainder of 2007.

In late October 2008 City Brewery-Latrobe laid off 70 workers, forcing a temporary shutdown, and had not brewed beer at the plant since November. Boston Beer Co. has since moved their operations to an old Schaefer plant they purchased near Allentown, PA. In May 2009, Iron City Brewing signed a deal with City Brewing Company to once again begin producing beer at the plant, with brewing started in June and bottling/kegging production resumed in July 2009.

In July 2009, some Southern Tier brewing brands (Double White, IPA, Altbier, Pumpkin, Imperial Porter) were moved to Latrobe from Lion Brewing.

In addition to Iron City Beer, City Brewing Company also produces Stoney's and Stoney's Light.

On December 8, 2009, City Brewing completed the installation of a can line and started canning in 12 and 16 ounce packages. A 24 ounce can line was expected to be completed in early 2010.

In 2012, Diageo moved production of the U.S. supply of Red Stripe from Jamaica to the Latrobe Brewery. Guinness Blonde was also being brewed there, which moved to a Guinness brewery in Baltimore, Maryland, in 2018. On September 7, 2016, Diageo returned production of Red Stripe to Kingston.
