= The Garden (Bran Van 3000 album) =

Studio album by Bran Van 3000
- Released: October 19, 2010
- Recorded: 2010
- Genre: Alternative rock, electronica, alternative dance
- Length: 60:56
- Label: Audiogram Records
- Producer: James Di Salvio & Les Troublemakers (Marc Bell & Cristobal Tapia de Veer)

Bran Van 3000 chronology
Rosé (2007)	The Garden (2010)

Singles from The Garden
- 1. "Grace (Love on the Block)" Released: September 7, 2010

The Garden is the fourth studio album from Canadian collective Bran Van 3000. It was released on October 19, 2010.

The first single was "Grace (Love on the Block)", released on September 7, 2010.

The album debuted at #17 on the Canadian Albums Chart.

== Track listing ==
1. "A Tryst" (Feat. K-Town Sophia) - 0:58
2. "Garden Waltz" (Feat. Carinne And Francesca Como) - 3:56
3. "Oui Got Now" (Feat. Liquid And Stephane Moraille) - 4:16
4. "Drop Off" (Feat. Coco Thompson) - 6:33
5. "You" (Feat. Francesca Como And Malicious) - 4:14
6. "You Too" (Feat. Jahsepta) - 1:44
7. "Grace (Love On The Block) (Feat. Michael Rey)" - 3:06
8. "Cowboy Hoot" (Feat. Liquid) - 1:50
9. "Jahrusalem" (Feat. EP Bergen, Dorian And Sidaffa Bakel) - 3:30
10. "World Party" (Feat. Steeve Khe, Liquid And Jahsepta) - 5:08
11. "This Day" (Feat. Ben Wilkins) - 3:19
12. "La Dolce Vita" (Feat. Freddie James) - 5:43
13. "Journey" (Feat. Helena Nash, Jahsepta And Kim Bingham) - 5:53
14. "Stillness" (Feat. Rafaelle Mackay Smith And Alexandre Desilets) - 3:44
15. "Saltwater Cats" (Feat. Kim Neundorf And Malicious) - 7:02
