= Y tu mamá también =

2001 film by Alfonso Cuarón

- Theatrical release poster
- Directed by: Alfonso Cuarón
- Written by: Alfonso Cuarón; Carlos Cuarón
- Produced by: Alfonso Cuarón; Jorge Vergara
- Starring: Maribel Verdú; Gael García Bernal; Diego Luna
- Narrated by: Daniel Giménez Cacho
- Cinematography: Emmanuel Lubezki
- Edited by: Alex Rodríguez; Alfonso Cuarón
- Production company: Producciones Anhelo
- Distributed by: 20th Century Fox
- Release date: June 8, 2001
- Running time: 106 minutes
- Country: Mexico
- Language: Spanish
- Budget: $5 million
- Box office: $33.6 million

Y tu mamá también (English: And Your Mama Too) is a 2001 Mexican coming-of-age erotic comedy-drama road film directed by Alfonso Cuarón, who co-wrote the screenplay with his brother Carlos Cuarón. The film follows two teenage boys who embark on a road trip with a woman in her late twenties and stars Diego Luna, Gael García Bernal, and Maribel Verdú, with narration by Daniel Giménez Cacho. Set in 1999, it unfolds against the backdrop of Mexico's political and economic realities at the close of seven uninterrupted decades of Institutional Revolutionary Party (PRI) presidencies and the rise of the opposition led by Vicente Fox.

In addition to directing and co-writing the film, Cuarón produced it with Jorge Vergara and edited it with Alex Rodríguez. Its frank depictions of sex, nudity, and drug use complicated its rating. In Mexico the film opened to $2.2 million, setting a new record for the highest box-office opening weekend in Mexican cinema. It was released in English-speaking markets in 2002 under its original Spanish title, receiving a limited theatrical run in the United States. The film earned widespread critical acclaim, especially for Cuarón's direction, the screenplay, and the performances of its three leads. It received Academy Award and Golden Globe nominations for Best Original Screenplay and Best Foreign Language Film, respectively, and has since been widely regarded as one of the best films of the 21st century.

== Plot ==
The events, set in Mexico in 1999, are punctuated by a voice-over, omniscient narrator who comments on the characters' thoughts, history, and future, and those of some of the people and places they encounter.

Two teenage best friends, working-class Julio and upper-class Tenoch, graduate from high school and see their girlfriends off on a trip to Italy. Despite their vow to remain faithful, they intend otherwise. During the lavish wedding reception of Tenoch's older sister, they meet Luisa, the Spanish wife of Tenoch's cousin Jano. Trying to impress her, the boys describe a fictitious secluded beach called Boca del Cielo ("Heaven's Mouth"), to which they invite her. Days later following a doctor's visit, she receives a drunken call from Jano who tearfully confesses his infidelity. The next day, she takes Tenoch and Julio up on their invitation.

Tenoch and Julio hurriedly ask a stoner friend for directions to a beach that could pass for the imaginary Boca del Cielo, and the three set off and drive through rural Mexico. The teenagers talk about their friendship and, when asked by Luisa, boast about their sexual exploits. Luisa speaks of Jano and recalls her first love, who died in a motorcycle accident. During one of their stops, Luisa leaves a message on Jano's answering machine explaining that she has left him.

Throughout the trip, Luisa's extroverted and upbeat persona is interspersed by bouts of inconsolable crying. On one such occasion, Tenoch enters her motel room, at which point she daubs her tears and seduces him. Julio witnesses them having sex and, upset, walks away. He later tells Tenoch he had sex with Tenoch's girlfriend, in violation of one of the rules governing their friendship. Tenoch spends the night furiously scolding Julio and asking for details.

Noticing tension the next day, Luisa has sex with Julio to "equalize" the boys' perceived status. Tenoch then jealously reveals that he, too, has had sex with Julio's girlfriend, sparking a quarrel that nearly comes to blows. After being shoved while trying to intervene, Luisa angrily berates their immaturity and sexual incompetence, and walks away. Shocked by her outburst, they beg her to stay, which she does in exchange for her own set of rules to keep them at bay.

Although they have forgotten the directions, the three eventually reach the sea, where a local fishing family boats them to an isolated beach called Boca del Cielo. They relax and enjoy the ocean during the day and spend the night in a nearby village, where Luisa makes another phone call to Jano to bid him an affectionate but final farewell. The three get drunk that evening and joke about their sexual histories. Julio and Tenoch reveal that they have in fact had sex with each other's girlfriends frequently. Julio says he had sex with Tenoch's mother, though it is unclear whether he is serious. The three dance together sensually and then retire to their room. As Luisa kneels and stimulates them both, Julio and Tenoch embrace and kiss each other passionately.

The next morning, the boys wake up naked together. After bolting out of bed, they express a sudden eagerness to return home. The narrator states that the boys' journey home is quiet and uneventful. Luisa stays behind to explore the nearby coves. The boys' girlfriends break up with them upon returning from Italy, and the boys stop hanging out with each other.

A year later, after a chance encounter in Mexico City, Julio and Tenoch go for coffee together. They catch up on each other's lives and news of their mutual friends. Tenoch informs Julio that Luisa died of cancer a month after their trip, and that she had been aware of her prognosis during the entire trip. Tenoch finds an excuse to leave. Although the two boys agree to meet up in the future, the narrator states that they will never see each other again.

== Cast ==
- Maribel Verdú as Luisa Cortés
- Gael García Bernal as Julio Zapata
- Diego Luna as Tenoch Iturbide
- Diana Bracho as Silvia Allende de Iturbide
- Andrés Almeida as Diego "Saba" Madero
- Ana López Mercado as Ana Morelos
- Nathan Grinberg as Manuel Huerta
- Verónica Langer as María Eugenia Calles de Huerta
- María Aura as Cecilia Huerta
- Juan Carlos Remolina as Alejandro "Jano" Montes de Oca
- Daniel Giménez Cacho as Narrator

Cuarón was initially reluctant to cast Luna as Tenoch because of his status as a teen idol and telenovela actor in Mexico. García Bernal persuaded him to reconsider, arguing that their real-life friendship would make it easier to portray the bond between their characters. Cuarón ultimately agreed, convinced that their friendship would lend their performances a sense of naturalness and authenticity.

== Production ==
=== Development ===
After working on Great Expectations and A Little Princess, Alfonso Cuarón envisioned a film that was not influenced by production techniques used in Hollywood cinema. Cuarón wanted to reject commercial production techniques he had used in his previous films, like dollies, close-ups, and dissolves. Instead he embraced a documentary-realist style of filmmaking for Y tu mamá también. Before making the film, Cuarón had worked for some time in Hollywood, prior to return to his roots in Mexican cinema. In an interview, Cuarón said: "I wanted to make the film I was going to make before I went to film school, ...a film in Spanish, and a road movie involving a journey to the beach."

=== Road movie ===
In Y tu mamá también, Alfonso Cuarón reimagined the American road movie genre to depict Mexico's geography, politics, people, and culture. Cuarón wanted to use the road-film genre to challenge mid-20th century Latin-American Cinema movements that rejected the pleasure and entertainment typical of Hollywood commercial cinema created by using fictional characters and story. Cuarón aimed to only borrow the pleasure and entertainment of Hollywood cinema to synthesize with political and cultural exploration of Mexico. Using fictional characters and a story within the documentary-realist style, Cuarón was able to explore Mexico's geographical, cultural, and political landscapes.

=== Filming and production ===
Cuarón's script was minimal and unelaborate so the actors could contribute to its development during the rehearsal process. Throughout the film, the actors improvised. Instead of using high-tech equipment, the entire film was shot with a handheld camera to create a documentary-realist look that mimicked candid footage. In an interview, Cuarón said it all went "back to our original idea of 15 years ago, in which we would do a low-budget road movie that would allow us to go with some young actors and semi-improvise scenes and have a bare storyline but not be afraid of adding things as we went."

=== Locations ===
The beach scenes in the film were shot near the resort Bahías de Huatulco in Oaxaca.

The first hotel the three main characters stayed at during their road trip was the Hotel Guelaguetza, a real-life hotel in Oaxaca.

== Soundtrack ==
No.	Title	Writer(s)	Artist	Length
1.	"Here Comes the Mayo"	Barry Ashworth, Francisco "Paco" Ayala, Randy Ebright, Ismael Fuentes, Miguel Huidobro, Jason O'Bryan	Molotov and Dub Pistols	4:06
2.	"La Sirenita"	Ignacio Jaime	Plastilina Mosh	3:55
3.	"To Love Somebody"	Barry Gibb, Robin Gibb	Eagle Eye Cherry	3:55
4.	"Showroom Dummies"	Ralf Hütter	Señor Coconut	5:29
5.	"Insomnio"	Rubén Isaac Albarrán Ortega, Emmanuel del Real Díaz, Aleja Flores, Enrique Rangel Arroyo, José Alfredo Rangel Arroyo	Café Tacuba	2:59
6.	"Cold Air"	Corner, Coverdale-Howe, Natalie Imbruglia, Pickering	Natalie Imbruglia	5:01
7.	"Go Shopping"	Bran Van 3000	Bran Van 3000	2:52
8.	"La tumba será el final"	Felipe Valdés Leal	Flaco Jiménez	2:44
9.	"Afila el colmillo"	E. Acevedo, Jay de la Cueva, J. B. Lede, María Rodríguez, Florentino Ruiz Carmona	Titán, La Mala Rodríguez	2:52
10.	"Ocean in Your Eyes"	Miho Hatori, Smokey Hormel	Miho Hatori, Smokey Hormel	4:02
11.	"Nasty Sex"	Fancisco Javier del Campo, Muriel Rojas Rodríguez, Óscar Rojas Rodríguez	La Revolución de Emiliano Zapata	4:02
12.	"By This River"	Brian Eno, Dieter Moebius, Hans-Joachim Roedelius	Brian Eno	3:03
13.	"Si no te hubieras ido"	Marco Antonio Solís	Marco Antonio Solís	4:47
14.	"Watermelon in Easter Hay"	Frank Zappa	Frank Zappa	9:05
15.	"Y tu mama tambien"	Upsurt feat. Beloslava	Upsurt feat. Beloslava	3:55

== Release ==
=== Finance and distribution ===
Y tu mamá también was produced by Anhelo Producciones, a company co-founded by Cuarón and Jorge Vergara, a well-known Mexican businessman and the film's producer. The company provided sufficient funding to make the film and launch an impressive marketing campaign. The $5 million film budget was substantial by Mexican film standards. Advertisement and publicity appeared across Mexico. Along with the help of Anhelo Producciones, the ratings board controversy gave the film free publicity in Mexico.

Good Machine International handled international sales for the film outside North America, Latin America and Spain under its “Uncensored Cinema” banner which explores the theme of sexuality without restrictions. Cuaron licensed the rights in Spain to Sogepaq and Latin America to 20th Century Fox, who subsequently acquired the German, Swiss, Italian and French rights from Good Machine. Shortly after the Mexican release, IFC Films acquired the North American distribution rights to the film.

In 2026, Janus Films acquired all distribution rights to the 4K restoration of Y tu mamá también in North American and UK territories, with plans for a re-release in 2027.

=== Home media ===
Y tu mamá también was released in the United States on DVD in an unrated version in 2002 by MGM Home Entertainment. In 2014, it received a Blu-ray release as part of The Criterion Collection.

== Reception ==
A box office success both domestically and abroad, Y tu mamá también grossed $2.2 million in its first week, breaking Mexico's box office records for domestic films. It went on to gross a record $12 million in Mexico.

The film grossed $13.8 million in the US and Canada, making it the second-highest grossing Spanish language film in the United States at the time, and poised Bernal for crossover success into American markets (Bernal's 2004 performance in The Motorcycle Diaries would go on to break this record). It grossed $33.6 million worldwide.

Critically, Y tu mamá también received acclaim upon its original release. The review aggregator website Rotten Tomatoes reported that 90% of critics gave the film positive reviews, based upon a sample of 195, with an average rating of 8.4/10. The website's critical consensus states, "Led by a triumvirate of terrific performances, Alfonso Cuarón's free-spirited road trip through Mexico is a sexy and wistful hymn to the fleetingness of youth". On Metacritic, the film received an average score of 89 out of 100 based on 36 reviews, indicating "universal acclaim". Roger Ebert gave the film four stars out of four, saying, "Beneath the carefree road movie that the movie is happy to advertise is a more serious level—and below that, a dead serious level."

Y tu mamá también won the Best Screenplay Award at the Venice Film Festival. It was also a runner-up at the National Society of Film Critics Awards for Best Picture and Best Director and earned a nomination for Best Original Screenplay at the 2003 Academy Awards. The film made its US premiere at the Hawaii International Film Festival. In 2021, members of Writers Guild of America West (WGAW) and Writers Guild of America, East (WGAE) voted its screenplay 86th in WGA’s 101 Greatest Screenplays of the 21st Century (so far).

=== Censorship controversies ===
The film was released without a rating in the US because a market-limiting NC-17 would otherwise have been unavoidable based on the film's graphic depiction of sex, nudity and drug use. Critic Roger Ebert questioned why film industry professionals were not outraged by the MPAA's expected rating of the film in light of the MPAA's leniency regarding violence; Ebert asked: "Why do serious film people not rise up in rage and tear down the rating system that infantilizes their work?"

In Mexico, the film received a "C" Rating, which is equivalent to an 18+ in America. In 2001, Alfonso and Carlos Cuarón sued the Mexican Directorate of Radio, Television, and Cinema (RTC) for the film's 18+ rating, which they considered illegal political censorship. They took legal action to expose the government-controlled ratings board, prompting its transformation into an autonomous organization free of government involvement and political influence. The 18+ rating was administered for strong sexual content, nudity involving teens, drug use, and explicit language, and prevented audiences under 18 from admittance. They claimed the ratings board was operating illegally by denying parents the right to choose who can watch the film, violating fundamental legal rights in Mexico.

=== Accolades ===
Award	Category	Recipient	Result
Academy Awards	Best Original Screenplay	Alfonso Cuarón and Carlos Cuarón	Nominated
BAFTA Awards	Best Film not in the English Language		Nominated
BAFTA Awards	Best Original Screenplay	Alfonso Cuarón and Carlos Cuarón	Nominated
Golden Globe Awards	Best Foreign Language Film		Nominated
National Society of Film Critics Awards	Best Film		Runner-up
National Society of Film Critics Awards	Best Foreign Language Film		Won
National Society of Film Critics Awards	Best Screenplay	Alfonso Cuarón and Carlos Cuarón	Nominated
National Society of Film Critics Awards	Best Director	Alfonso Cuarón	Runner-up
New York Film Critics Circle Awards	Best Foreign Language Film		Won
Broadcast Film Critics Association Awards	Best Foreign Language Film		Won
Independent Spirit Awards	Best Foreign Film		Won
Grammy Awards	Best Compilation Soundtrack for Visual Media	Alfonso Cuarón, Camilo Lara and Liza Richardson, compilation producers	Nominated
Venice Film Festival	Best Screenplay	Alfonso Cuarón and Carlos Cuarón	Won

=== Best-of lists ===
- Empire's 100 Best Films Of World Cinema – #20
- Los Angeles Film Critics Association's Films of the Decade – #9
- The New York Times's Best 1,000 Movies Ever Made
- Entertainment Weekly's 25 Sexiest Movies Ever!
- The New York Times's 100 Best Movies of the 21st Century – #18
- Rolling Stone's 100 Best Movies of the 21st Century – #5
