= Beaver attack =

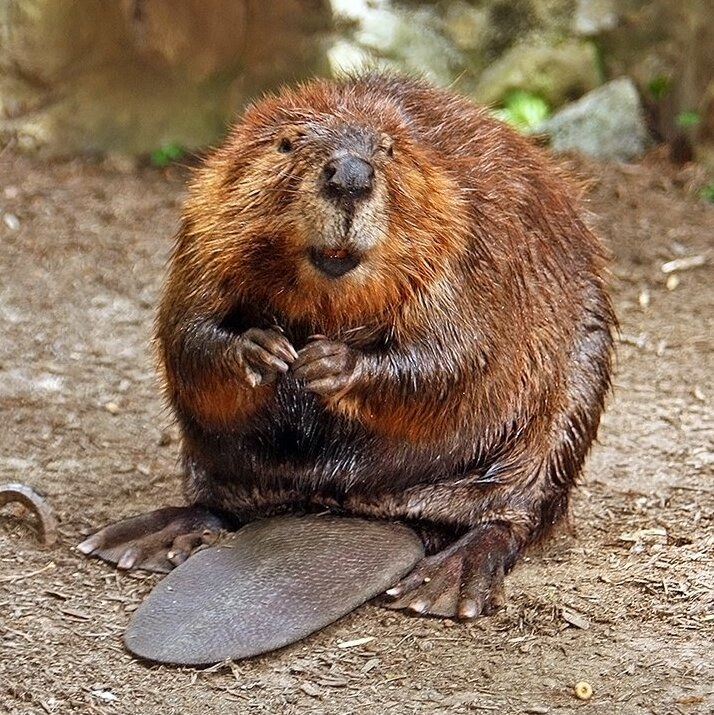
A North American beaver

Beaver attacks on humans and domestic pets are relatively uncommon, but reports of such incidents are increasing in frequency as humans enter and disturb many animals' natural habitats.

Beavers have been known to be extremely aggressive in defending their territory against perceived encroachment. They may attack humans when infected by rabies, and "can also become disoriented during the daytime and attack out of fear." Attacks on land and in water have been recorded for both Eurasian beavers and North American beavers. The trademark sharp front teeth of both species pose a particular danger, as they are long enough to pass through limbs and cause significant bleeding.

At least one beaver attack on a human is known to have been fatal: a 60-year-old fisherman in Belarus died in 2013 after a beaver bit open an artery in his leg. The incident was described by the media as "the latest in a series of beaver attacks on humans in the country," where a burgeoning beaver population has led to increased aggressive interactions with people. However, others criticized the victim, noting that he likely provoked the attack when he grabbed the beaver in an effort to take a photo with it.

Non-fatal attacks on humans have included: an attack on a saltwater snorkeler off the coast of Nova Scotia, which was unusual given that beavers are usually limited to fresh water; the mauling of an elderly woman in Virginia by a rabid beaver; an attack on a Boy Scout leader in Pennsylvania, after which members of the Scout troop killed the rabid animal by stoning; and an attack on a man swimming in Dobra River, Croatia. In 2021, an elderly Massachusetts man was also attacked by a beaver that left him with bites to his legs, hands and head.

Beaver attacks can also be fatal for domestic animals. A dog died during surgery after being bitten by a beaver in 2010 at University Lake in Alaska, where a number of unprovoked attacks against pets were recorded. A husky was killed by a beaver in Alberta, which has also had several non-fatal attacks.

== Culture ==
A mid-1990s interview recounting a beaver attack is among the most frequently requested recordings from the archives of the Canadian Broadcasting Corporation. Molson Canadian incorporated a beaver attack into an advertisement that portrayed a Canadian drinker's stereotypical pet attacking a mocking American in a bar.
