= À Paradis City =

2015 album by Jean Leloup

Studio album by Jean Leloup
- Released: 2 February 2015
- Length: 32:54
- Label: Grosse Boite

À Paradis City is the eighth album by artist Jean Leloup, released on February 2, 2015, under the label Grosse Boîte (now Bravo Musique). It was well received critically, with both the album and its associated tour receiving several awards in Canada.

== History ==
À Paradis City is the first album published by Leloup after the six years of silence following Mille Excuses Milady (2009). This period is marked by several challenges Jean Leloup faced in his personal life as reflected by the songs in this album, which are almost all centered around death. In the same way that the album art shows an amputated dog with three legs, Jean Leloup considers himself a survivor, still able to walk despite poor decisions sometimes made.

The album had a successful release, selling 20,000 copies the week after being published and 82,000 after its first year, causing it to receive a platinum record.

== Track listing ==
No.	Title	Length
1.	"Willie"	4:10
2.	"Les Flamants Roses"	4:03
3.	"Petit Papillion"	3:34
4.	"Paradis City"	2:48
5.	"Les Bateaux"	4:17
6.	"Feuille au Vent"	1:53
7.	"Voyageur"	3:23
8.	"Retour à la Maison"	3:05
9.	"Le Roi se Meurt"	2:52
10.	"Zone Zéro"	2:49
Total length:		32:54

== Awards ==
Year	Award	Category	Result	Reference
2015	Félix Prize (ADISQ)	Rock Album of the Year	Won	
2015	Félix Prize (ADISQ)	Song of the Year (for Paradise City)	Won	
2015	Félix Prize (ADISQ)	Bestselling Album of the Year	Nominated	
2016	Félix Prize (ADISQ)	Singer-Songwriter Performance of the Year (for Jean Leloup solo – Le Fantôme de Paradis City)	Won	
2016	Félix Prize (ADISQ)	Singer-Songwriter Performance of the Year (for Jean Leloup et son orchestre en concert à Paradis City)	Won	
2016	Juno Prize	Francophone Album of the Year	Won	
2016	Juno Prize	Album of the Year	Nominated	
