= Jean Leloup =

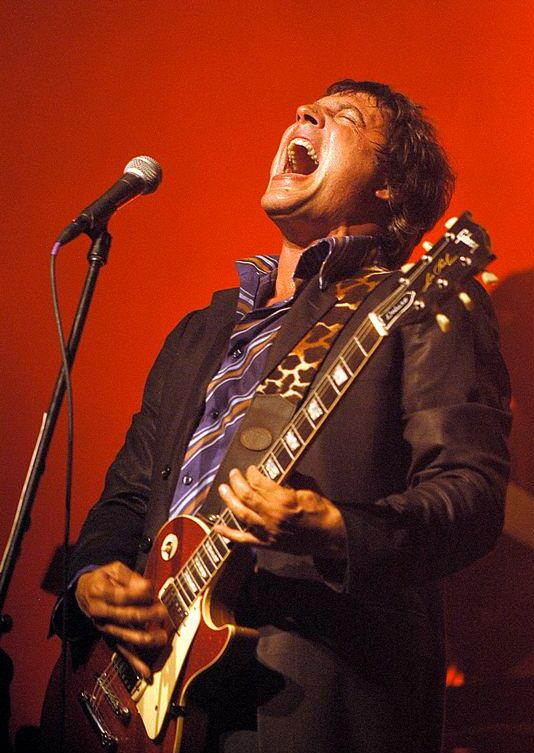

Background information
- Also known as: Jean Leclerc; John the Wolf; Massoud Al-Rachid; Roi Ponpon
- Born: May 14, 1961 (age 65)
- Origin: Sainte-Foy, Quebec, Canada
- Genre: Rock
- Occupation: Singer-songwriter
- Instruments: Vocals, guitar
- Years active: 1989–present

Jean Leclerc (born May 14, 1961) is a Canadian singer-songwriter and author from Sainte-Foy, Quebec. He is popularly known as Jean Leloup (French pronunciation: [ʒɑ̃ ləlu]; which he likes to translate as John the Wolf), a stage name he kept using until 2006, when he temporarily changed his name to Jean Leclerc, only to resurrect his wolf character in August 2008. He is known for his colourful personality and unique musical style in the francophone rock community.

== Biography ==
Born in Sainte-Foy in 1961 to Québécois parents, Jean Leclerc grew up in Africa, more precisely in Togo and Algeria. The culture and way of life of his host country had an important influence on him and influenced many of his songs. Leclerc listened to the Rolling Stones, the Beatles, and Jimi Hendrix, and taught himself to play guitar. He was also influenced by colorful French music icons such as Jacques Dutronc, Jacques Higelin, Serge Gainsbourg and Michel Polnareff.

Leclerc returned to Quebec in 1976, and appeared on the music scene in the 1980s. In 1983, he was noticed at the Festival international de la chanson de Granby and participated in the rock opera Starmania in 1986. However, he quickly distanced himself from the latter because of its "clean" character. Opting for the stage name of Jean Leloup (nicknamed John the Wolf by fans and by himself), he appeared on stage in Montreal in the late 1980s. Since the beginning of his career, he has made waves with his provocative lyrics. For example, in the song "1990", he compares the high-tech actions of Desert Storm to his sexual activities with his girlfriend.

Leclerc's 1990 album L'amour est sans pitié was a hit outside of Quebec, and was released in the rest of Canada, USA, France, the Netherlands, Belgium and Japan. Leclerc was the recipient of a Félix Award in 1997, following the success of his 1996 album Le Dôme.

At the end of 2003, Leclerc retired the name Jean Leloup and went on hiatus from his recording career. In August 2005, he announced his temporary return to the music scene through a collaboration with the band Porn Flakes. A first single called "Les Corneilles" has been heard on Quebec's radio stations. In the months preceding his return, Leclerc wrote the philosophical novel Noir destin que le mien (originally entitled Le Tour du monde en complet) under the pen name Massoud Al-Rachid; it was published on October 5, 2005 at Leméac editions. Leclerc released the album Mexico in September 2006, his first under the name Jean Leclerc.

Jean Leclerc returned to the stage on August 29, 2008 for the 400th year of Quebec City's founding. He revived the name Jean Leloup for the occasion. The show was held at the Colisée Pepsi. Although controversial, Jean Leclerc mentioned that the "last hour of the show was the best of his life". Under the name Jean Leloup, Leclerc released the album Mille Excuses Milady (translated to "a thousand apologies, Milady") on April 28, 2009, the first since he publicly declared that he wouldn't produce another album.

In 2016, his album À Paradis City was nominated for the Juno Award for Album of the Year, and won the Juno Award for Francophone Album of the Year. He received another Juno Award nomination for Francophone Album of the Year at the 2020 Juno Awards for his 2019 album L'Étrange pays.

== Discography ==
- 1989: Menteur
- 1990: L'amour est sans pitié
- 1996: Le Dôme
- 1998: Les Fourmis
- 2002: La Vallée des réputations
- 2004: Exit (live album)
- 2005: Je joue de la guitare 1985–2003 (compilation)
- 2006: Mexico (as Jean Leclerc)
- 2009: Mille excuses Milady
- 2015: À Paradis City
- 2019: L'Étrange Pays

=== Collaborations ===
- 1997: Glee (with Bran Van 3000)
- 2001: Discosis (with Bran Van 3000)
- 2002: Jouisseland by Martin Villeneuve
- 2011: The Last Assassins (with The Last Assassins)

== See also ==
- List of Quebec musicians
- Music of Quebec
- Culture of Quebec
