= Rolling Rock Town Fair =

American alt-rock music festival (2000–2005)

- Begins: August 5, 2000
- Ends: August 6, 2005
- Frequency: Annually
- Locations: Westmoreland Fairgrounds Mount Pleasant, PA (2000-2002; 2004); PNC Park Pittsburgh, PA (2003); Suffolk Downs Boston, MA, Penn's Landing Philadelphia, PA, King County Fairgrounds Seattle, WA (2004); Jennerstown Speedway Jennerstown, PA (2005)

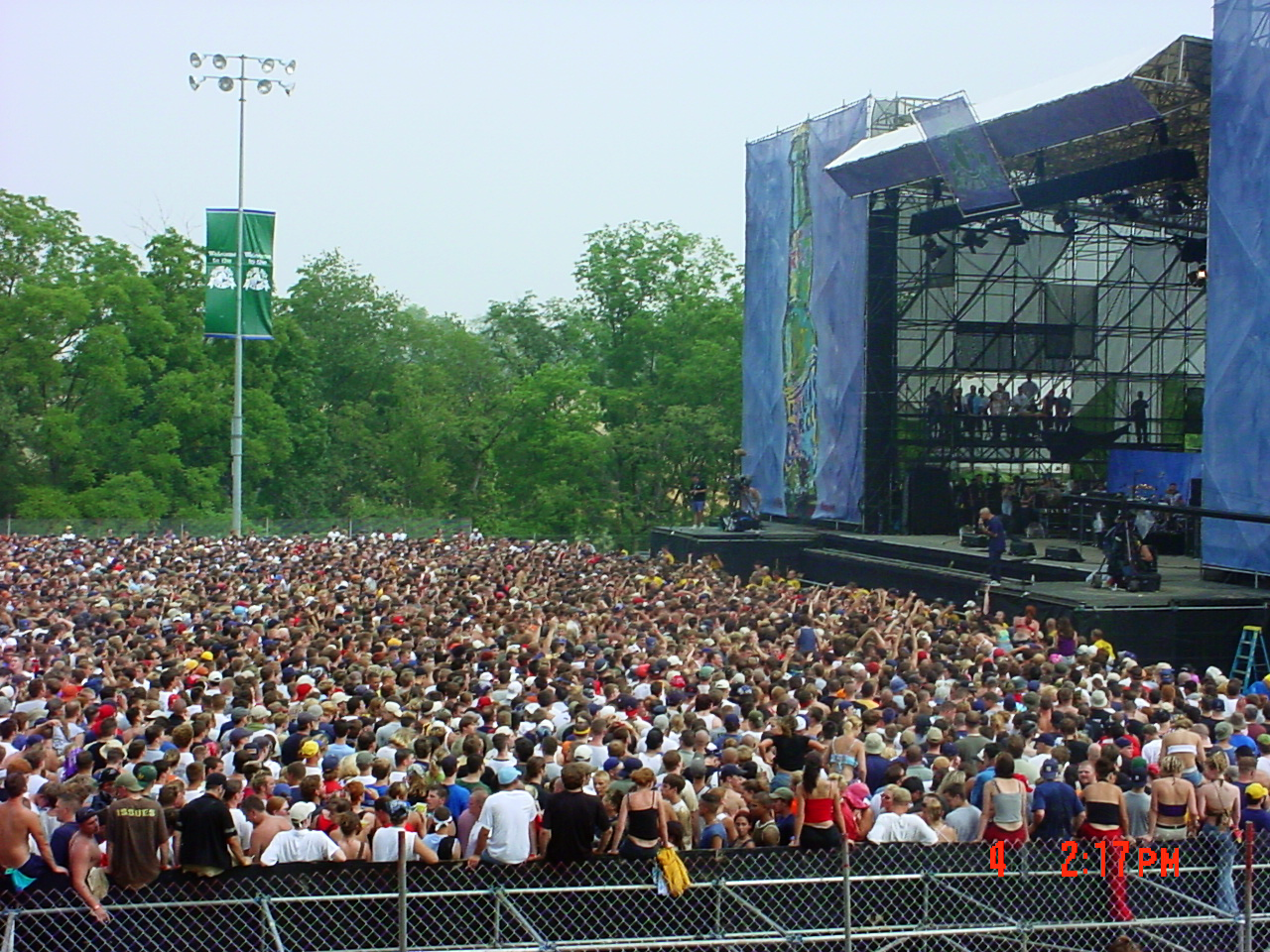
Staind performs at the Town Fair on August 4th, 2001.

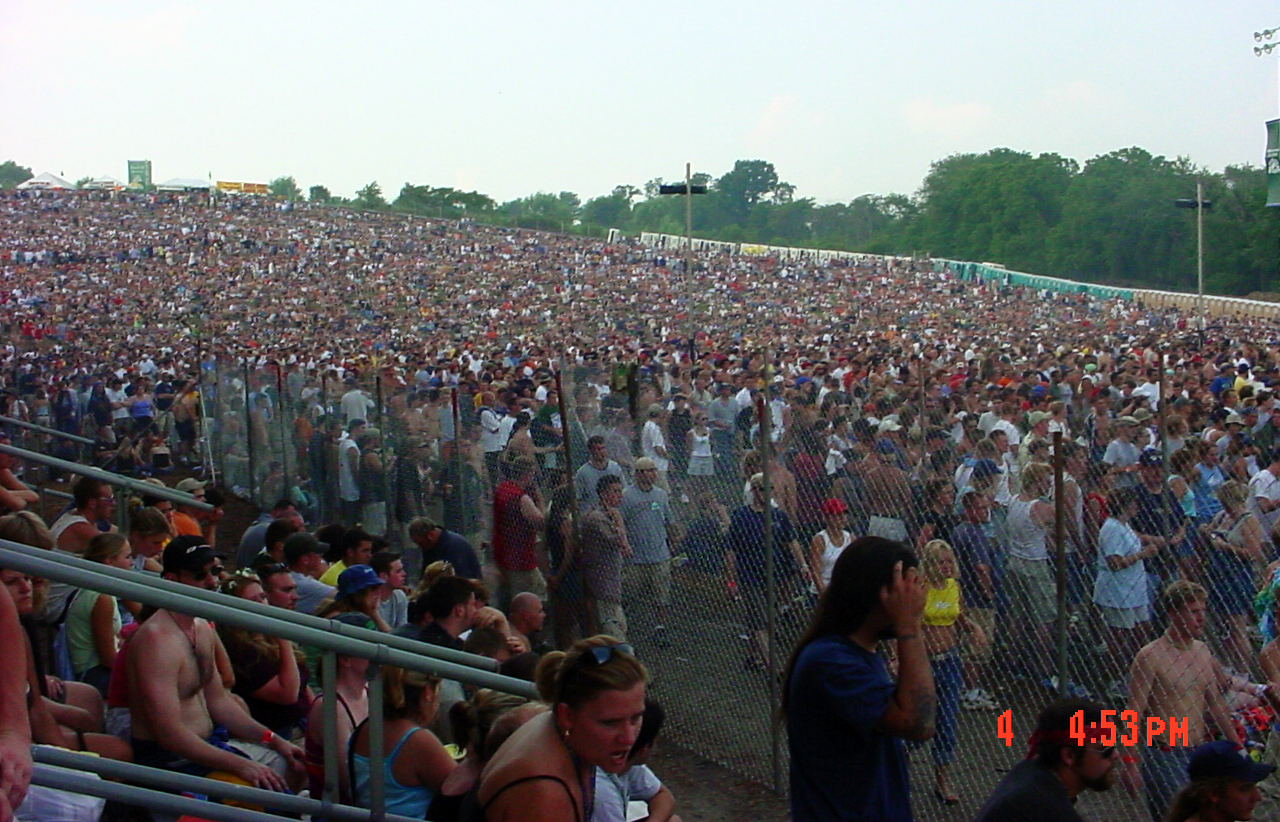
A view of the crowd at the Town Fair on August 4th, 2001.

The Rolling Rock Town Fair was an annual alternative rock music festival and tour from 2000 to 2005 sponsored by Rolling Rock beer of Latrobe, Pennsylvania. The event was created and produced by Executive Producer, Andrew Cohen and Darin Wolf, then Director of Marketing for Rolling Rock.

Starting on August 5, 2000, the first event featured the Red Hot Chili Peppers, Filter, Fuel, Moby, Our Lady Peace and Marcy Playground .

The August 4, 2001, lineup featured the Stone Temple Pilots, Live, Deftones, Incubus, Staind, Oleander, U.P.O., Tantric and Throe (Boston, MA).

The July 27, 2002, show included Godsmack, Outkast, Nickelback, P.O.D., Alien Ant Farm, Sevendust, Default, Injected, and Tommy Lee. Alien Ant Farm cancelled Rolling Rock Town Fair 2002 following their bus accident. Tommy Lee was the replacement for them.

For the July 26, 2003, show, the location was moved from the Westmoreland Fairgrounds in Mount Pleasant, Pennsylvania, to Heinz Field in Pittsburgh, Pennsylvania, and included Blink-182, Puddle of Mudd, 311, Def Leppard, Sum 41, Saliva and Trapt.

In 2004, the festival became a tour, with additional performances at non-traditional venues such as Suffolk Downs in Boston on June 12, Penn's Landing in Philadelphia on June 19, Seattle's King County Fairgrounds on June 26 and July 31 back at the Westmoreland Fairgrounds in Mount Pleasant, with performances by Velvet Revolver, Staind, N*E*R*D, Disturbed, the Crystal Method, Sevendust, Hoobastank, Three Days Grace, Finch, Throe (Boston, MA) and Finger Eleven.

For the August 6, 2005, show, the event was scaled back to its roots, with a sole performance in Western Pennsylvania at Jennerstown Speedway in Jennerstown, Pennsylvania. The event featured many Pennsylvania-based bands such as The Clarks, Live, Rusted Root, The Juliana Theory, and Bloodhound Gang.

Rolling Rock did not continue the event in 2006, after making a deal to sponsor a series of concerts by Steven Van Zandt.
