= Me Mom and Morgentaler =

Canadian ska band

- Origin: Montreal, Quebec, Canada
- Genre: Third wave ska
- Years active: 1990–1996
- Past members: Gus Coriandoli; Kim Bingham; John Jordan; Adam Berger; Kasia Hering; Sid Zanforlin; Matt Lipscombe; Noah Green; John Britton

Me Mom and Morgentaler were a Canadian third wave ska band based in Montreal, Quebec. The band members included Gus "Van Go" Coriandoli, Kim Bingham, John Jordan, Adam "Baltimore Bix" Berger, Kasia Hering, Sid Zanforlin, Matt Lipscombe, Noah Green, Diane White, and John "JB" Britton. They were known for their elaborate live performances, spectacles of vaudevillian-styled performance art with leftist leanings. They sang in English, Spanish, and French.

== History ==
The band formed in 1988. They chose their name, with its reference to Henry Morgentaler, a doctor and pro-choice activist, before performing at a talent show at Marianopolis College where nuns worked.

In 1991, the band released an EP, Clown Heaven & Hell. In 1993, they released a studio album, Shiva Space Machine, and in 1994 a live album, We Are Revolting, was released.

The band broke up in 1996. Green went on to join NYC-based nerdcore hip hop band 2 Skinnee J's, taking the stage name J Guevara. Coriandoli also moved to New York, where he became involved in rock music production and opened a studio in Brooklyn. Bingham went on to a solo career, releasing an EP as Mudgirl before reverting to her own name for future releases.

=== Reunions ===
The band played a one-off reunion show at the Montreal International Jazz Festival in 1999, and later reunited in late 2007 for a series of four Montreal shows in support of the re-release of Shiva Space Machine. The new CD offered re-ordered, remixed versions of the band's classics, along with three unreleased live tracks.

== Awards ==
In 2007, Me Mom and Morgentaler was presented with a Tribute Award at the Quebec Independent Music Awards.

== Discography ==
- Clown Heaven and Hell (1991, EP)
- Shiva Space Machine (1993)
- We Are Revolting: Live & Obscure 1990–1994 (1994, live)
- Shiva Space Machine: Gone Fission (2007)
