= City Brewing Company =

Brewery in La Crosse, Wisconsin

Coordinates: 43°48′15.49″N 91°15′20.62″W

City Brewing Company, Inc.
- Industry: Beverages
- Predecessor: G. Heileman Brewing Company
- Headquarters: La Crosse, WI, USA
- Products: Alcoholic beverages; Non-alcoholic beverages
- Number of employees: 500+
- Website: citybrewery.com

City Brewing Company, Inc. (also known as City Brewery), is a brewery with locations in La Crosse, Wisconsin; Irwindale, California; Memphis, Tennessee; and Latrobe, Pennsylvania, USA.

The La Crosse location was the flagship facility of the former Heileman Brewery, and can brew up to 7 million barrels of beer a year. Its twin-stream brewhouse can simultaneously manage 16 separate brews yielding a total of 1,100 barrels per day.

== History ==
In 1999 the old G. Heileman Brewing Company's former brewery buildings in La Crosse were bought by a group of investors who founded the City Brewing Company. This brought the brewing facility back in name only to 1858 when German immigrants John Gund and Gottlieb Heileman originally founded the G.Heileman Brewing Company in La Crosse.

In September 2006, the company agreed to purchase the Latrobe Brewery in Latrobe, Pennsylvania, former makers of Rolling Rock. The new City Brewery Latrobe entered into an agreement with Boston Beer Company in April 2007, and began producing that company's Samuel Adams beer that spring. In March 2011, the company bought a brewery in Memphis, Tennessee, originally built by Schlitz in 1971 and later owned by Coors for $30 million.

=== Purchase of Latrobe Brewery ===
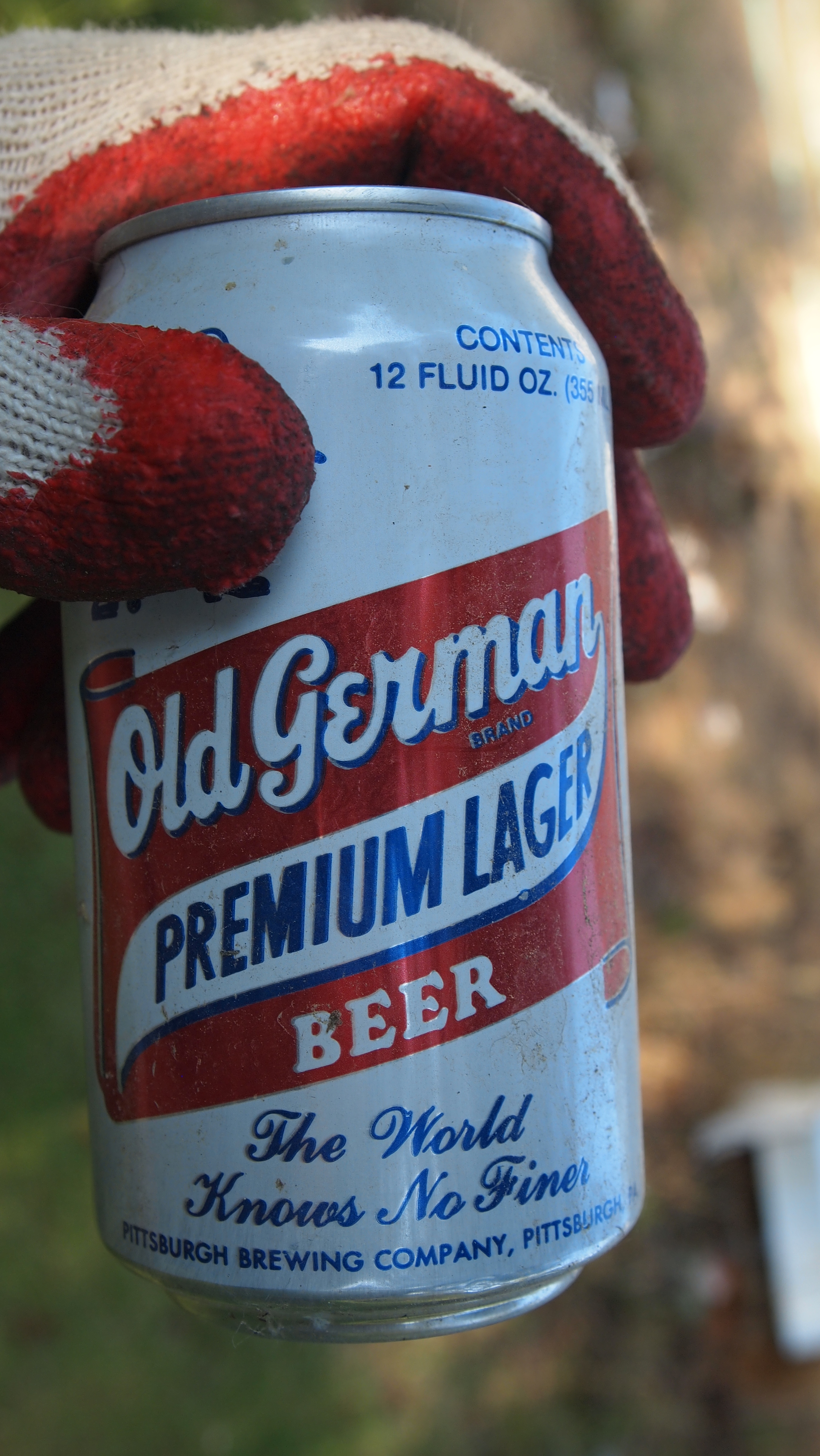
Old German is one of the beer brands contract-brewed by City Brewing

As Anheuser-Busch moved production of Rolling Rock to New Jersey in 2006, an owner was sought for the original Latrobe Brewing Company in Pennsylvania. City Brewery completed the purchase and in March 2007, the Latrobe brewery reopened its doors and to produce Samuel Adams for the Boston Beer Company. Boston Beer had pledged 3 to 7 million dollars to upgrade the plant. It was estimated that 200,000 to 250,000 barrels of beer would be produced in the plant during the remainder of 2007.

In late October 2008 City Brewery-Latrobe laid off 70 workers, forcing a temporary shutdown, then stopped brewing beer at the plant in November. Boston Beer Co. moved their operations to an old Schaefer brewery it had purchased in the Lehigh Valley of Pennsylvania. In May 2009 Iron City Brewing signed a deal with City Brewing Co to begin producing beer at the plant in June, with bottling/kegging production resumed in July, 2009.

In July 2009 some Southampton brands (Double White, IPA, Altbier, Pumpkin, Imperial Porter) were moved to Latrobe from Lion Brewing, of Wilkes-Barre, PA.

In addition to Iron City Beer, City Brewing also produces Stoney's and Stoney's Light in Latrobe.

In 2009, the Latrobe plant installed a can line and started canning in 12- and 16-ounce packages. A 24-ounce can line was added later.

City Brewing has produced Real American Beer since 2024.

== Other uses of "City Brewery" ==
City Brewery was also the name of another Wisconsin company founded by Johann Braun in 1846, which merged into the Valentin Blatz Brewing Company of Milwaukee.

City Brewery was also the name of a brewing company founded in 1855 in Dunkirk, NY by George Dotterweich, an immigrant from Germany. George Dotterweich died in 1884 and the brewery was taken over by his brother, Andrew J. Dotterweich. In 1900, Andrew J. died and the brewery was taken over by his son Andrew C. Dotterweich. The company name was then changed to the A. Dotterweich Brewing Company, and operations continued until the start of Prohibition.

== Bibliography ==
- Brewed with Style:The Story of the House of Heileman, Paul Koeller and David H. Delano, 2004, published by the University of Wisconsin–La Crosse Foundation and the City Brewing Company.
