= Shiva Space Machine =

Studio album by Me Mom & Morgentaler
- Released: 1993; 2007 (re-release)
- Genre: third wave ska
- Labels: Chooch Records; Éditions Musiart (re-release)
- Producer: Glen Robinson

Me Mom & Morgentaler chronology
Clown Heaven and Hell (1991)	Shiva Space Machine (1993)	We Are Revolting: Live & Obscure 1990-1994 (1994)

Shiva Space Machine was an album by Me Mom & Morgentaler, released in 1993 on Chooch Records. It was the band's sole full-length studio album. "Oh Well" was released as a single and accompanied by a music video. The video was nominated for "Best Alternative Video" at the 1993 Canadian Music Video Awards. The music style has been characterised as a mix of "ska, punk, funk, rap and polka".

The album was re-released in 2007 as Shiva Space Machine: Gone Fission (Expanded Edition) by Éditions Musiart. It features remixed and remastered versions of the album, along with previously unreleased live tracks. The song order is different from the original version and the song "The Ghost of Martin Sheen" is omitted.

== Track listing ==
=== Original 1993 release ===
1. "Are You Really Happy? (Intro)"
2. "Jacqueline"
3. "Oh Well"
4. "Everybody's Got AIDS"
5. "I Still Love You Eve"
6. "Angel's Time"
7. "Heloise"
8. "My Mother's Friends"
9. "Anarchie"
10. "Your Friend"
11. "Pepita la pistolera"
12. "Invasion of the Corporate Cockroaches from Planet Widdley"
13. "No More Nervous Breakdown"
14. "The Ghost of Martin Sheen"
15. "Open Up for Your Demon"
16. "Landlord"

=== 2007 re-release ===
1. "Jacqueline"
2. "Your Friend"
3. "Oh Well"
4. "Heloise"
5. "Pepita la pistolera"
6. "Beneath the Planet of the Corporate Cockroaches"
7. "Anarchie"
8. "Open Up for Your Demon"
9. "Everybody's Got AIDS"
10. "I Still Love You Eve"
11. "My Mother's Friends"
12. "Angel's Time"
13. "Landlord"
14. "No More Nervous Breakdown"
15. "Laura" [Live] (From the Clown Heaven and Hell EP)
16. "Fast Cars & Easy Women" [Live] (Foufounes Électriques, Montréal - 1990)
17. "Easy Way Out" [Live] (Foufounes Électriques, Montréal - 1990)
18. "Master of the Universe" [Live] (Rialto, Montréal - 1993)
19. "Race Against the Clock" [Live] (Métropolis, Montréal - 1993)
20. "Mood Swings" [Live] (Hidden Track)
