= Rosé (album) =

Studio album by Bran Van 3000
- Released: (Canada) October 30, 2007; November 27, 2007 (international release)
- Recorded: 2006–2007
- Genre: Alternative dance, electronica, hip hop
- Length: 70:15
- Label: Remstar Records

Bran Van 3000 chronology
Discosis (2001)	Rosé (2007)	The Garden (2010)

Singles from Rosé
- 1. "Call Me (I'll Be Around)" Released: October 4, 2007

Rosé is the third studio album from Canadian collective Bran Van 3000.

After the release of their second album Discosis in 2001, and the subsequent folding of their then-label Grand Royal, the band went on hiatus. In mid-2006, leader James Di Salvio contacted the other members of the band in order to start work on Rosé. Recording took place mainly in Los Angeles.

The first single from the album is "Call Me (I'll Be Around)", which was serviced to Canadian radio stations on October 4, 2007. The track samples The Spinners' song "I'll Be Around".

== Track listing ==
1. "Call Me (I'll Be Around)" - 6:35
2. "House Lights" - 4:05
3. "Feline Fantasy" - 5:18
4. "Da Lion" - 0:32
5. "Sea of Life" - 5:01
6. "Let It Go" - 0:46
7. "Trees" - 0:29
8. "Beautiful Girl" - 3:03
9. "Stand Up" - 4:21
10. "Rappy Rappy Rappy Rap" - 0:15
11. "So Fine" - 4:12
12. "Palm Springs" - 0:31
13. "Forever" - 5:43
14. "Mon Réal" - 4:00
15. "Rosé" - 0:39
16. "Tony Roman" - 2:04
17. "Sex, Love & Peace" - 7:42
18. "Rainbow Princess" - 0:28
19. "Can You Handle It" - 1:04
20. "I Wont Lie" - 5:43
21. "Our Haze" - 4:04
22. "Kiss" - 3:40

== Chart performance ==
Rosé debuted and peaked at #9 on the Canadian album chart in the November 8, 2007 issue.
