= Discosis =

Studio album by Bran Van 3000
- Released: May 29, 2001
- Genres: Alternative rock, electronica
- Length: 69:15
- Label: Virgin / Grand Royal

Bran Van 3000 chronology
| Glee (1997) | Discosis (2001) | Rosé (2007) |

Singles from Discosis
- 1. "Astounded" Released: 2001; 2. "Love Cliche" Released: 2001

Professional ratings
Review scores
| Source | Rating |
|---|---|
| Allmusic | 4.5/5 stars |

Discosis is the second album by Canadian group Bran Van 3000, released in 2001. The album features several collaborators, including Curtis Mayfield, Youssou N'Dour, Jean Leloup and reggae artist Eek-a-Mouse. The album cover was derived from an artwork by Boris Vallejo. The album debuted at #5 on the Canadian Albums Chart, selling 9,236 copies during its first week. The album featured the single "Astounded", which was a hit in Canada. Discosis was among the top 150 best-selling albums of 2001 in Canada.

== Track listings ==
1. "Astounded" (feat. Curtis Mayfield) – 5:57
2. "Loop Me" – 3:10
3. "Montréal" (feat. Youssou N'Dour) – 4:11
4. "BV3" – 0:57
5. "Discosis" (feat. Big Daddy Kane, Dimitri From Paris) – 3:24
6. "Go Shoppin'" (feat. Eek-A-Mouse) – 2:43
7. "More Shopping" (feat. Momus) – 3:02
8. "The Answer" (feat. Dizzy D, Summer Rose) – 4:04
9. "Jean Leloup's Dirty Talk" (feat. Jean Leloup) – 1:09
10. "Loaded" (feat. Big Daddy Kane) – 3:25
11. "Speed" – 5:24
12. "Predictable" – 4:44
13. "Senegal" (feat. Youssou N'Dour) – 2:25
14. "Dare I Say" (feat. Jean Leloup) – 3:59
15. "Stepchild" (feat. Badar Ali Khan) – 4:33
16. "Love Cliché" – 4:00
17. "Rock Star" – 3:28
18. "Astounded" (Demon Mix) – 8:23

== Year-end charts ==
Year-end chart performance for Discosis
| Chart (2001) | Position |
|---|---|
| Canadian Albums (Nielsen SoundScan) | 145 |
