= Molson Canadian =

Beer brand

- Type: North American lager
- Manufacturer: Molson
- Introduced: 1959; 67 years ago
- Alcohol by volume: 5% (4% in Ireland)
- Variants: Molson Canadian Light; Molson Canadian 67; Molson Canadian 67 Sublime; Molson Canadian 6.0 Coldshots
- Website: http://www.molsoncanadian.ca

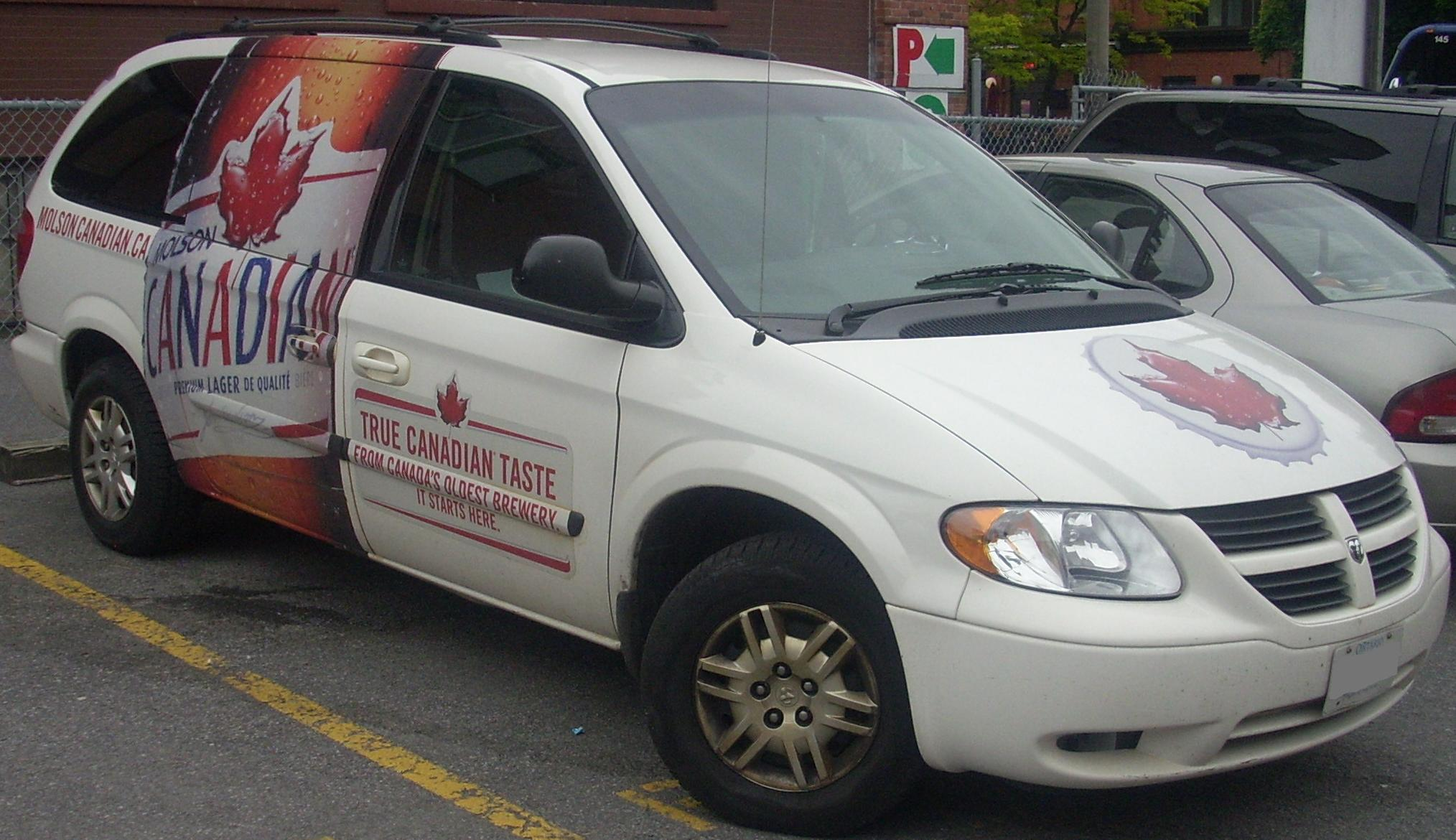
A Molson Canadian Dodge Grand Caravan model.

Molson Canadian is a 5% abv North American lager beer produced by the Molson Brewery, the Canadian division of Molson Coors. It was first introduced in 1959.

== Awards ==
Molson Canadian has won several beer industry awards, including:

- Canadian Brewing Awards - 2006 Gold Medal ‘North American Style Lager’
- World Beer Cup - 2002 Silver Medal
- Monde Selection - 6 Time Gold Medal Distinction (1989, 1990, 1991, 1997, 2001 and 2002).

== Mega Keg ==
The "Molson Canadian Mega Keg" is the world's largest monument to a keg of Molson Canadian. The monument measures 11 metres (36.5 feet) by five metres (16.5 feet), or roughly the height of a three-story building.

The monument was revealed to winners of a contest themed around the Mega Keg in September 2008. Were it a real keg, the Mega Keg monument would be large enough to hold the equivalent volume of over 500,000 cans of Molson Canadian.

Molson Canadian contracted Mississauga, Ontario-based Kubik to design and construct the massive monument.

== Molson Canadian Sub-Zero ==
Molson Canadian Sub Zero is Molson Canadian served at temperatures below freezing (0C or 32F).

== Molson Canadian Red Leaf Project ==
The Molson Canadian Red Leaf Project is an environmental platform that was introduced in 2011, which saw 100,000 trees planted in locations across Canada, in addition to park clean-up efforts in ten cities.

== National Hockey League ==
In February 2011 Molson entered a partnership with the National Hockey League, however, a series of court rulings delayed the beginning of the partnership until the opening night of the 2011–12 season on October 6.

The $375-million deal, which ran for seven years, reportedly includes the following expenditures: approximately $100-million for the rights, $100-million in guaranteed advertising buys, and $100-million in so-called activation, which includes costs for the events and special promotions staged by Molson to capitalize on its rights.
