= Astounded (Bran Van 3000 song) =

2001 single by Bran Van 3000

Single by Bran Van 3000 featuring Curtis Mayfield

from the album Discosis
- Released: May 7, 2001
- Genre: Funk; soul; nu-disco
- Length: 5:57 (album version); 3:54 (long radio edit); 3:29 (short radio edit)
- Label: Virgin; Grand Royal
- Songwriters: James Di Salvio; Gary McKenzie; Curtis Mayfield; Dominique Grand; Sylvain Grand
- Producers: James Di Salvio; Ric Ocasek; Dominique Grand; Sylvain Grand

Bran Van 3000 singles chronology
"Afrodiziak" (1999)	"Astounded" (2001)	"Love Cliché" (2001)

Music video
- "Astounded" on YouTube

"Astounded" is a song by Canadian musical collective Bran Van 3000 featuring vocals from American artist Curtis Mayfield. The song contains interpolations from Mayfield's song "Move On Up" and also contains a sample and an interpolated melody of The Doobie Brothers' "Rockin' Down the Highway". The song was first released for download on Bran Van 3000's website in January 2001. It was then officially released on May 7 of the same year as the lead single from their second studio album, Discosis (2001).

"Astounded" was successful in Canada, receiving heavy airplay on MuchMusic and reaching number three on the Canadian Singles Chart. Outside Canada, the song reached the top 40 in Finland, Italy, the Netherlands, and the United Kingdom; in the latter country, it peaked at number two on the UK Dance Chart. The song was among Canada's 40 most played radio tracks in 2001 and was ranked number 19 on MuchMore's list of "Top 50 Dance Songs".

== Background ==
Bran Van 3000 member James Di Salvio approached Curtis Mayfield with the idea of collaborating months before his death in 1999. Mayfield was too ill to contribute a vocal, but weeks before his death, he gave Di Salvio permission to pull through his archives, which is where he discovered an unused vocal Mayfield recorded in the 1980s. With Mayfield's permission, that vocal was incorporated into "Astounded."

== Music video ==
The music video was directed by Paul Street and premiered in May 2001. The entire video focuses on a couple french kissing and features shots of Montreal with the Olympic Stadium in the background. The video features a cameo by Benicio Del Toro.

== Track listings ==
Canadian, European, and Australian maxi-CD single

1. "Astounded" (long radio edit) – 3:54
2. "Astounded" (album version) – 5:57
3. "Astounded" (MJ Cole radio edit) – 3:47
4. "Astounded" (Eric Kupper radio mix) – 3:42

UK CD single

1. "Astounded" (long radio edit) – 3:54
2. "Astounded" (album version) – 5:56
3. "Astounded" (MJ Cole Master Mix) – 6:21

European CD single

1. "Astounded" (long radio edit) – 3:54
2. "Astounded" (album version) – 5:57

European 12-inch vinyl

A1. "Astounded" (album version) – 5:57
B1. "Astounded" (MJ Cole Master Mix) – 6:21
B2. "Astounded" (Eric Kupper club mix) – 7:25

== Credits and personnel ==
Credits are lifted from the maxi-CD single liner notes and the Discosis album booklet.

Studio

- Mixed at Olympic Studios (London, England)

Personnel

- James Di Salvio – writing, production
- Gary McKenzie – writing
- Curtis Mayfield – writing, vocals
- Dominique Grand – writing, production, engineering, string arrangement
- Sylvain Grand – writing, production, engineering, string arrangement
- Ric Ocasek – production
- Mark "Spike" Stent – mixing
- Rod Shearer – engineering
- Martin Rouillard – engineering
- Craig Aaronson – executive production

== Charts ==
=== Weekly charts ===
Weekly chart performance for "Astounded"
Chart (2001)	Peak position
Australia Hitseekers (ARIA)	16
Australian Dance (ARIA)	16
Austria (Ö3 Austria Top 40)	47
Belgium (Ultratip Bubbling Under Flanders)	1
Belgium Dance (Ultratop Flanders)	12
Canada (Nielsen SoundScan)	3
Canada CHR (Nielsen BDS)	8
Croatia (HRT)	7
Europe (Eurochart Hot 100)	77
Finland (Suomen virallinen lista)	17
Germany (GfK)	91
Ireland (IRMA)	42
Ireland Dance (IRMA)	10
Italy (FIMI)	24
Netherlands (Dutch Top 40)	36
Netherlands (Single Top 100)	72
Scotland Singles (OCC)	35
Sweden (Sverigetopplistan)	49
Switzerland (Schweizer Hitparade)	72
UK Singles (OCC)	40
UK Dance (OCC)	2
US Dance Club Play (Billboard)	35

=== Year-end charts ===
Year-end chart performance for "Astounded"
Chart (2001)	Position
Canada (Nielsen SoundScan)	32
Canada Radio (Nielsen BDS)	33

== Release history ==
Release dates and formats for "Astounded"
Region	Date	Format(s)	Label(s)	Ref.
Canada	May 7, 2001	Maxi-CD	Virgin; Grand Royal	
United Kingdom	June 4, 2001	12-inch vinyl; CD	Virgin; Grand Royal	
Australia	July 16, 2001	CD	Virgin; Grand Royal	

== In popular culture ==
The song is featured on the soundtrack of the EA Sports video game FIFA Street 2.
