= Glee (Bran Van 3000 album) =

Studio album by Bran Van 3000
- Released: April 15, 1997
- Genres: Alternative rock; rap rock; electronica; hip hop; trip hop; lounge
- Length: 57:02
- Labels: Audiogram; Capitol
- Producers: James "Bran Man" Di Salvio; E. P. Bergen; Haig Vartzbedian

Bran Van 3000 chronology
Glee (1997)	Discosis (2001)

Singles from Glee
- 1. "Drinking in L.A." Released: February 1997; 2. "Couch Surfer" Released: 1997; 3. "Everywhere" Released: 1998

Professional ratings
Review scores
Source	Rating
AllMusic	3/5 stars
The Guardian	3/5 stars
The List	4/5 stars
NME	4/10
Pitchfork	8.6/10
Q	4/5 stars
Rolling Stone	2.5/5 stars
Sunday Mirror	4/5 stars
The Village Voice	A−

Glee is the debut studio album by Canadian music collective Bran Van 3000. The Canadian version was released on April 15, 1997, through Audiogram, while the international version, slightly altered from the original, was released on March 17, 1998, through Capitol Records. The album contains the hit single "Drinking in L.A." and features hip hop supergroup Gravediggaz on "Afrodiziak".

Glee was certified gold for sales of 50,000 copies by the Canadian Recording Industry Association on February 24, 1998. It won the Juno Award for Alternative Album of the Year at the 1998 Juno Awards.

== Track listings ==
Canadian edition
No.	Title	Writer(s)	Length
1.	"Gimme Sheldon"	James Di Salvio; Eric Bergen	5:31
2.	"Couch Surfer"	Di Salvio; Bergen; Bernard Gunther; Duane Larson	2:51
3.	"Drinking in L.A."	Di Salvio; Larson; Haig Vartzbedian	3:56
4.	"Problems"	Di Salvio	1:42
5.	"Highway to Heck"	Di Salvio; Bergen; Larson; Adam Chaki	1:00
6.	"Forest"	Di Salvio; Bergen; Steve Hawley; Jayne Hill; Nick Hynes; Jean Leloup	4:13
7.	"Hardrockin' Cincinnati"		1:09
8.	"Afrodiziak"	Di Salvio; Bergen; Hawley	3:50
9.	"Lucknow"	Di Salvio; Bergen; Chaki; Larson	2:29
10.	"Cum On Feel the Noize"	Noddy Holder; Jim Lea	3:24
11.	"Exactly Like Me!"	Di Salvio; Bergen; Vartzbedian; Robert Eaglesham	3:33
12.	"Everywhere"	Di Salvio; Chaki; Hill; Vartzbedian	3:56
13.	"Ceci n'est pas Une Chanson"	Di Salvio; Bergen	6:47
14.	"Willard"	Di Salvio; Dave Hodge	2:26
15.	"Supermodel"	Di Salvio; Bergen; Hawley; Larson	5:24
16.	"Oblonging"	Di Salvio; Hill	2:56
17.	"Mama Don't Smoke"	Johnston; Eric Grauer	1:55

International edition
No.	Title	Writer(s)	Length
1.	"Gimme Sheldon"	Di Salvio; Bergen	3:59
2.	"Couch Surfer"	Di Salvio; Bergen; Gunther; Larson	2:50
3.	"Drinking in L.A."	Di Salvio; Larson; Vartzbedian	3:56
4.	"Problems"	Di Salvio	1:38
5.	"Highway to Heck"	Di Salvio; Bergen; Larson; Chaki	0:55
6.	"Forest"	Di Salvio; Bergen; Hawley; Hill; Hynes; Leloup	3:44
7.	"Rainshine"	Di Salvio; Bergen; Hill; Hynes; Bakel; Joanisse; Johnston; McKenzie	3:29
8.	"Carry On"	Di Salvio; Bergen; Hawley; Hill; Hynes; Joanisse; Johnston; McKenzie; Moraille	4:57
9.	"Afrodiziak"	Di Salvio; Bergen; Hawley	4:38
10.	"Lucknow"	Di Salvio; Bergen; Chaki; Larson	2:09
11.	"Cum On Feel the Noize"	Holder; Lea	3:21
12.	"Exactly Like Me!"	Di Salvio; Bergen; Vartzbedian; Eaglesham	3:33
13.	"Everywhere"	Di Salvio; Chaki; Hill; Vartzbedian	3:54
14.	"Une Chanson"	Di Salvio; Bergen	2:35
15.	"Old School"	Di Salvio; Bergen; Hawley; Hill; Hynes; Joanisse; Johnston; McKenzie; Moraille	2:47
16.	"Willard"	Di Salvio; Dave Hodge	2:25
17.	"Supermodel"	Di Salvio; Bergen; Hawley; Larson	5:24
18.	"Oblonging"	Di Salvio; Hill	1:37
19.	"Mama Don't Smoke"	Johnston; Grauer	1:56
