= We Are Revolting: Live & Obscure 1990–1994 =

We Are Revolting: Live & Obscure 1990-1994

Compilation album by Me Mom & Morgentaler
- Released: 1994
- Genre: third wave ska
- Label: Chooch Records

Me Mom & Morgentaler chronology
Shiva Space Machine (1993)	We Are Revolting: Live & Obscure 1990-1994 (1994)	Shiva Space Machine: Gone Fission (2007)

We Are Revolting: Live & Obscure 1990–1994 is a compilation album by Me Mom & Morgentaler, released in 1994 on Chooch Records. It was the band's final release, and compiled several live and rare tracks from the band's catalogue. The album was also rereleased in 1999 on Stomp Records.

Several of the songs were incorrectly labelled on the original 1994 release.

== Track listing ==
1. "Beneath the Planet of the Corporate Cockroaches"
2. "Master of the Universe"
3. "Tailspin"
4. "Everybody's Got AIDS"
5. "My Mother’s Friends"
6. "Auparavant"
7. "Laura"
8. "Spittle on My Chin"
9. "You Can Quote Her on That"
10. "Pepita la pistolera"
11. "Under the Searchlight"
