= Stéphane Moraille =

Canadian lawyer, artist, cultural leader

- Also known as: Shauna Davis
- Born: August 13, 1970 (age 56); Port-au-Prince, Haiti
- Genres: World Music, rhythm and blues, soul, blues, pop
- Occupations: Singer, composer, performer, lawyer, politician
- Website: http://stephanemoraille.ca/

Stéphane Moraille (born August 13, 1970, Port-au-Prince) is a Haitian-born singer-songwriter and lawyer from Quebec. She is the granddaughter of the first female lawyer of Haiti, Me Georgette Justin, 1933. Moraille stood for the Bar in 2001, and is currently specializing in media law.

Moraille began her musical career in 1993 under the pseudonym Shauna Davis, releasing several dance and house music singles that received regular airplay on MuchMusic, MusiquePlus, and radio stations including Energy 108 and Hot 103.5 in Toronto. In 1997, she achieved wider success with the Montreal band Bran Van 3000, on the album Glee. A member of the group since its inception, she sang on the three subsequent albums, Discosis, Rosé and The Garden.

In 2017, she released her first solo EP, Pi Wo, a prelude to her album Daïva, which was released on February 23, 2018. Her vocal prowess has drawn comparisons to Aretha Franklin at her peak.

Moraille stood as a candidate for the New Democratic Party in the federal riding of Bourassa in the November 25, 2013, by-election. She was appointed on June 6, 2018, as an independent member of the board of directors of the Conseil des arts et des lettres du Québec. She was appointed to the executive committee of CCUNESCO and on the board of directors of the Canada Council for the Arts in October 2022

== Music ==
=== 1993–1999: Shauna Davis Project ===
Moraille made her name in the world of electronic music with the Shauna Davis Project in 1995. The hit "Get Away" was nominated for a Juno Award and a Much Music Video Award in Canada. The success of the song enabled her to tour the world and share the stage with DJ/producers such as David Morales, Stonebridge and Todd Terry. In 1999 the hit Try my Love was nominated for a Juno award in the best dance Recording category.

=== 1997–2001: Bran Van 3000 ===
Founding member of the Bran Van 3000 collective. The album Glee, released in 1997, was certified gold. Moraille's voice is featured on the song "Drinking in L.A.", which reached the top five of the pop and alternative charts worldwide, and peaked at number two in the UK.

The song has been featured in numerous films, TV shows and advertising campaigns, earning the collective a host of awards. It has been inducted in the Canadian Songwriters Hall of Fame.

=== 2017–present: Solo releases ===
In 2017, Moraille released an EP Pi Wo and the subsequent album Daïva.

==== Discography ====
2017: Pi Wo, EP
No.	Title	Length
1.	"Favourite"	5:22
2.	"Fanm vanyan"	3:48
3.	"Expensive (Aloufa)"	3:09
4.	"Pi Wo"	3:58
Total length:		16:18

2017: Daïva
No.	Title	Length
1.	"Favourite"	5:22
2.	"Fanm vanyan"	3:48
3.	"Supernova"	2:50
4.	"Twilit"	4:06
5.	"Zanmi"	3:39
6.	"Expensive (Aloufa)"	3:09
7.	"Good Hands"	3:54
8.	"Pi Wo"	3:58
9.	"Reckoning"	4:20
10.	"Babylon"	5:11
Total length:		40:20

== Law ==
Moraille has a master's degree in intellectual property law from the Osgoode Hall Law School. After passing the Quebec bar, she began practicing law in 2005. Her mentors include renowned entertainment lawyers Mes Zénaïde Lussier and Claire Benoit. In 2014, she founded her own law firm. From 2017 until 2022, she was Director of Legal and Business Affairs for PHI and the PHI Foundation for Contemporary Arts. She taught entertainment law at the School of Show Business, at the Institut national de l'image et du son and for the RFAVQ.

== Politics ==
In 2012, Moraille joined the NDP party under leader Thomas Mulcair. In 2013 she announced that she would be running for the federal NDP nomination in the Montreal riding of Bourassa. She was not elected.

== Awards and achievements ==
Moraille has received numerous awards and recognition in the music industry as a member of Bran Van 3000 including Félix, Juno, Much Music Video Award, SOCAN prize, Videofact Award, Canadian Radio Award, and Soba Award and in 2015 Moraille was nominated for the Slaight Family Polaris Heritage Prize in 2022. The song "Drinking in L.A." was inducted in the Canadian Songwriters Hall of Fame in 2023. Moraille has shown resilience and grace in the face of adversity and systemic racism
