= Rolling Rock =

American lager

- Type: American lager
- Manufacturer: Anheuser-Busch InBev
- Distributor: Latrobe Brewing Company
- Introduced: 1939
- Alcohol by volume: 4.4%
- Color: Golden yellow
- Website: rollingrock.com

Rolling Rock is a 4.4% abv American lager beer launched in 1939 by the Latrobe Brewing Company in Latrobe, Pennsylvania. Although founded as a local Western Pennsylvanian brand, it was marketed aggressively and eventually became a national product. The brand was sold to Anheuser-Busch of St. Louis, in mid-2006, which transferred brewing operations to New Jersey while continuing to label the new beer prominently with the name of Latrobe.

== History ==
From 1939 until July 26, 2006, Rolling Rock was brewed at the Latrobe Brewing Company in Latrobe, Pennsylvania, a small city 34 miles southeast of Pittsburgh. As stated on the bottle, it was brewed with a distinctive soft local water in large glass-lined tanks, which had been state-of-the-art at the time of its introduction.

On May 19, 2006, American brewing giant Anheuser-Busch purchased the Rolling Rock and Rolling Rock Green Light brands from Belgium-based InBev for $82 million and began brewing Rolling Rock at its Newark facility in mid July, 2006, marking the destruction and end of true Rolling Rock. The final batch of Rolling Rock was shipped from Latrobe on July 31, 2006. Union leaders in Westmoreland County organized a nationwide boycott of Anheuser-Busch and InBev brands because of the move. Anheuser-Busch has said that Rolling Rock's original pledge on the label will be preceded by these words: "To honor the tradition of this great brand, we quote from the original pledge of quality." In July 2008, InBev acquired Anheuser-Busch, creating Anheuser–Busch InBev.

In 2009, Anheuser-Busch InBev announced that it was exploring the sale of the Rolling Rock brand. In 2015, Anheuser-Busch stopped brewing bottled Rolling Rock in glass-lined tanks. Only the canned beer was being brewed using the traditional process.

== Pony bottle ==
Rolling Rock was once famous for its 7 U.S. fl oz (207 ml) pony bottle, which was the largest selling premium beer pony in Pennsylvania in 1952. Pony bottles got their name from small 19th century American pony glasses, named for their diminutive size.

== In media ==
Rolling Rock is a significant symbol in internet celebrity James Rolfe's series Angry Video Game Nerd, where his character, the Nerd, takes a sip from a bottle of the drink to calm himself down when getting angry at bad games.

== See also ==
- Iron City Brewing Company
- Rolling Rock Club
- Rolling Rock Town Fair
