= American lager =

Beer style produced in the United States and Canada

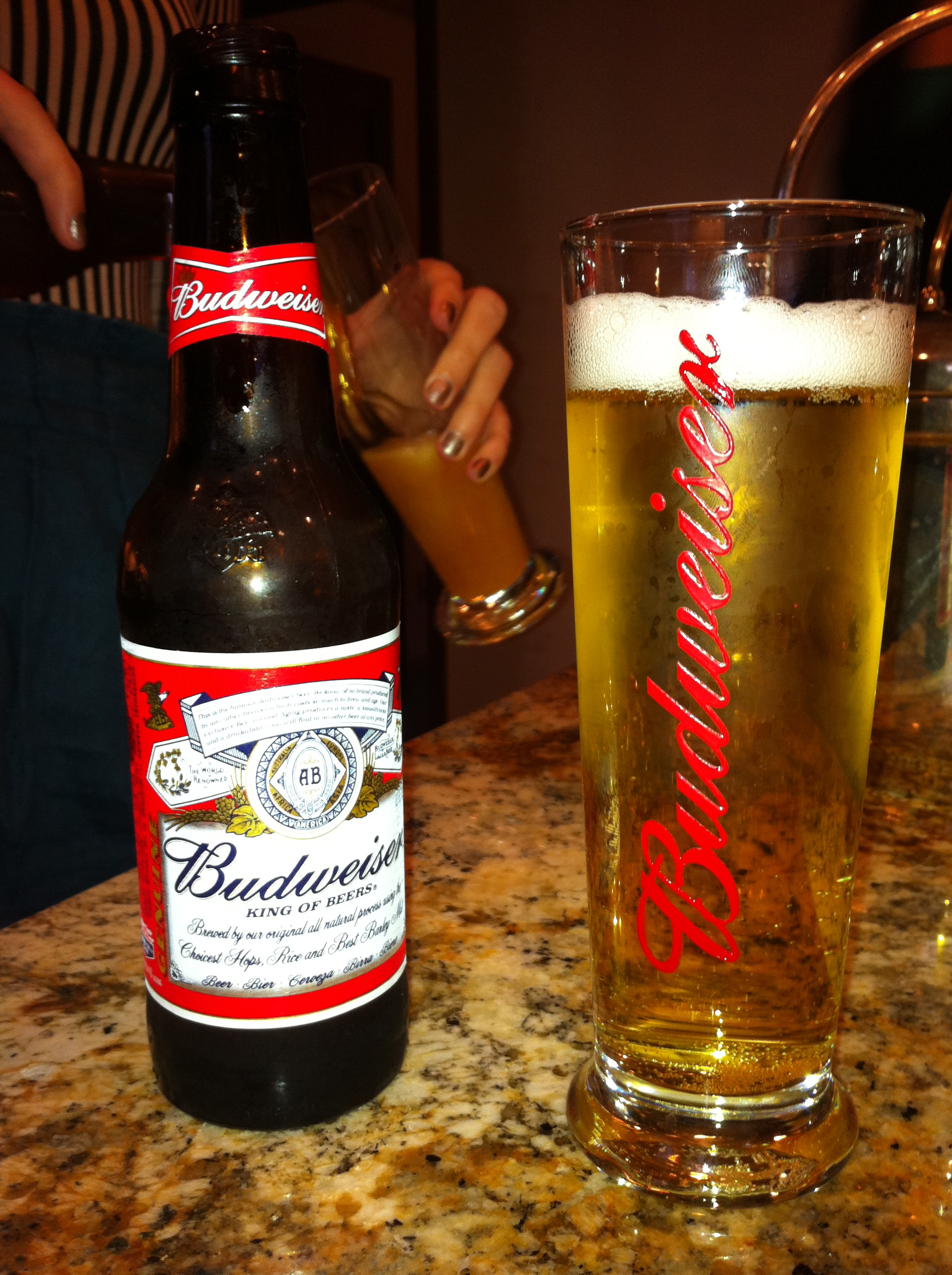
Budweiser, an American lager

The American lager or North American lager is a style of pale lager produced in the United States and Canada. Pale lagers originated in Europe in the mid-19th century and were brought to North America by German immigrants. While the Bavarian and Czech variants of this style may be firmly hopped, pale lager has developed into a modestly hopped beer in the rest of the world and sometimes uses adjuncts such as rice or corn – this is also true in the US and Canada.

The best-known American lagers worldwide are Anheuser-Busch InBev's Budweiser and Bud Light, although several other prominent brands are produced by MillerCoors; these include Coors Light, Coors Banquet, Miller Lite, and Miller High Life. Pale lager is the predominant choice among the largest brewing companies of United States of America, although it is not common in U.S. microbreweries. Likewise, in Canada the biggest-selling commercial beers, including both domestics such as Molson Canadian, Labatt Blue, Kokanee, Carling Black Label, and Old Style Pilsner, and imports such as Budweiser and Coors are very lightly hopped pale lagers. This is by far the largest-selling style in Canada. Just as in the United States, Canadian microbrewers typically do not produce North American-style pale lagers.

Other terms for this type of beer, or sub-categories within it, include "adjunct lager", "American-style light lager", "American-style low-carbohydrate light lager", "American-style lager", "American-style premium lager" (a term used at the World Beer Cup), "North American style-lager" and "North American-style premium lager" (terms used at the Canadian Beer Awards).

== History ==
The United States and Canada were traditionally ale (and whisky) consuming regions in the British traditions before the late 19th century. Pale lager was later introduced by German immigrants. These German brewers developed their beers from the American six-row barley which has a higher tannic acid and protein content and greater husk per weight than the two-row barley typical in continental Europe. In addition, the Tettnanger and Saaz hops of Europe were not available. Therefore, to balance taste, and dilute the excessive protein, the grain mixture was adjusted by adding up to 30% corn to the barley malt mash. However, the beer was brewed to full European strength and to the practices of a pale lager style. Later, rice gained popularity in the domestic brewing market during World War II, due to grain rationing on the home-front. Most breweries were unable to afford the necessary amounts of barley required for production and so began using rice as a filler. After the war, the process was not changed.

Canada had its own, shorter experiment with prohibition which bankrupted many breweries (and distilleries), and with the rise of mass media marketing and national-scale supply chains, the major breweries consolidated into a near triopoly dominated by Molson, Labatt, and Carling O'Keefe following the Second World War. These corporate brewers reacted to a new taste for sweet drinks in a public that had switched to sugary soft drinks and "near-beer" during prohibition.

Large-scale representatives of the pre-Prohibition lager style in the United States are D.G. Yuengling & Son with its traditional lager; Genesee Brewing Company with its Genesee beer; and August Schell Brewing Company with its Original. A number of smaller American breweries have also reintroduced it, such as Victory Brewing Company with its Headwaters Pale Ale, North Coast Brewing Company with Scrimshaw Pilsner, and Full Sail Brewing Company with its Session Lager.

== See also ==
- Beer in the United States
- Beer in Canada
- Light beer
