= Kingsbury Breweries Company =

Brewing company originally based in Manitowoc, Wisconsin

The Kingsbury Breweries Company was founded in 1847, at which time it was the Kunz & Bleser Brewing Company. The main location was Manitowoc, Wisconsin, with other locations in Sheboygan, Wisconsin and St. Paul, Minnesota. In 1926, the firm was sold to the Manitowoc Products Company and was known as the Gutsch Brewery.

Its corporate name was changed to Kingsbury Breweries Company in 1933. The Kingsbury name and label originated during the Depression as a near-beer because of the ban on alcohol during Prohibition. Following the end of Prohibition, the brewery was issued U-Permit No. WIS-U-734, allowing the resumption of brewing operations. In 1933, Kingsbury Pale and Kingsbury Ale began to be produced. Kingsbury's franchise brand was known as the "Aristocrat of Beer" and "Fit for a King."

Kingsbury's main offices remained in Manitowoc until 1963, when it merged with G. Heileman Brewing Company, which brewed and distributed Kingsbury label products until 1974.

The Geo. Wiedemann Brewing Company of Newport, Kentucky, brewed and sold Kingsbury Beer and Kingsbury Near Beer between 1967 and 1983. The Sioux City Brewing Company of Sioux City, Iowa, brewed and sold Kingsbury Beer from 1959 to 1960. The Stroh Brewery Company later, after it bought the G. Heileman Brewing Company, brewed and distributed some Kingsbury labels. Stroh's ceased operation in 1999-2000, and the Miller Brewing Company bought the Kingsbury Near Beer label, which is still brewed and distributed by Miller.

== Products ==
- Old Type Beer, 1934–1935
- Kingsbury Holiday Bock, 1934–1961
- Kingsbury Bock, 1934–1970
- Kingsbury Beer, 1934–1973
- Kingsbury Pale Near Beer, 1935–1940
- Kingsbury Export Beer, 1935–1942
- Kingsbury Brew Near Beer, 1938–1972
- Diamond G Ale, 1939–1941
- Zing Near Beer, 1958–1972
- Reidenbach Beer, 1963–1968

== See also ==
- List of defunct breweries in the United States
