= Falls City Brewing Company =

American brewery

- Industry: Alcoholic beverage
- Founded: 1905
- Defunct: 1978
- Products: Beer

Falls City Brewing Company was based in Louisville, Kentucky, USA. The company operated from 1905 until 1978. After the company closed the Falls City brand was purchased by differing groups of investors over the years.

Falls City was a regional brand that was primarily available in and around Louisville and Evansville, Indiana. It was a light-bodied pale lager brewed with six row malted barley, corn or rice adjunct, and was lightly hopped.

For many years, Falls City was the number one brand of beer sold in and around Louisville. Tavern signs still hang outside taverns around town from St. Matthews to Germantown.

== History ==
The Falls City Brewing Company was organized in 1905 by local tavern and grocery store owners. The name is taken from a nickname for Louisville, i.e. "Falls City," which derives from Louisville's position on the Falls of the Ohio. This company was a bit different from many breweries in the US as it was not family owned. It was organized to break a local monopoly on beer production by the Central Consumers Company. Central Consumers also owned the taverns (or tied houses) located in neighborhoods where they could be operated profitably. The brewer, acting as landlord and supplier at the same time, caused the tavern operator to be at their mercy. This practice, while common in the United Kingdom, was later outlawed in the US.

Draft beer was introduced in 1906 and bottled beer two years later. A small ice house was built in connection with the brewery, and ice was sold to peddlers who operated in the western part of the city. In 1911, the company purchased a five-ton Morgan truck and one half ton auto car, and there was a great rivalry among the drivers as to who would be chosen to drive the two trucks. Also in 1911, the Central Consumers company tried to buy out their little competitor. A number of heated debates took place and loyal stockholders fought to retain the company.

=== Prohibition ===
In 1919 the brewery was closed for Prohibition and the company reorganized. From 1919 to 1933 the company survived as the Falls City Ice and Beverage Company by producing ice, soft drinks, and near beer. Despite no longer being able to brew alcoholic beer, the company prospered.

=== Following Prohibition ===
Falls City beer production was resumed in 1933 and was distributed in the Ohio River Valley including Kentucky, Indiana, Tennessee, and West Virginia. Following Repeal, Falls City's chief competitors were Frank Fehr Brewing Company and Oertel Brewing Company, both rival Louisville breweries. Sterling Brewers of Evansville, Indiana, began making serious incursions in the Louisville market with its popular Sterling Beer. For a time Sterling actually overtook Falls City for the number one sales position in Louisville. Falls City overtook Sterling the number one sales position in Evansville at about the same time.

Falls City was briefly involved in auto racing. In the 1930s, Falls City was the official beer of the Indianapolis 500. In 1973, the company sponsored future NASCAR superstar Darrell Waltrip in the #48 car. Falls City also went on to sponsor a 200-mile race at the Nashville Speedway in both 1974 and 1975.

=== Drummond Bros. and the Sta-Tab ===
In 1975, Falls City launched a new brand of beer called Drummond Bros. The brand was lighter in body than Falls City and it was aimed at younger beer drinkers. The Drummond Bros. name had no historical significance. Instead, it was dreamed up as a catchy name by an advertising agency hired by the brewery. The Drummond Bros. brand was initially successful but within a few years sales declined. Also in 1975, Falls City Brewing Company became the first beverage maker to use the now familiar "Sta-Tab" on its cans. Prior to this invention, most cans used pull tabs or "pop tops" that were completely removed from the can. The Sta-Tab opened the can then could be folded back against the lid. Most beverage cans now feature the Sta-Tab.

=== Billy Beer ===
In 1977, Falls City representatives approached Billy Carter, brother of President Jimmy Carter, about marketing a signature brand to capitalize on Billy's fame as the beer-drinking black sheep of the Carter family. Falls City brewed several test batches in hopes that one would meet Carter's approval and could be marketed as Billy Beer. Carter, who had long been a Pabst Blue Ribbon drinker, chose one of the Falls City formulas and the brewery quickly developed a marketing campaign for Billy Beer. Realizing that a regional brewery could not fulfill national demand for the product, Falls City licensed several other independent regional breweries to brew and package Billy Beer. Those breweries were Cold Spring Brewing Company of Cold Spring, Minnesota; Pearl Brewing Company of San Antonio, Texas; and West End Brewing Company in Utica, New York. Billy Beer became a briefly-popular fad due to the company's expensive, large-scale marketing campaigns and promotion by Carter, however the cheaply made beer quickly fell out of favor, and in 1978 it was discontinued.

=== Sales decline and closing ===
During the 1970s, sales declined and in 1978 the company posted its first ever financial losses. The Falls City board elected to cease production rather than fight the onslaught of national brands that were gaining momentum in Falls City's core markets, which by then included Georgia and Mississippi as well as Tennessee, Kentucky, Indiana, Virginia and West Virginia. The Falls City and Drummond Bros. labels were sold to G. Heileman Brewing Company of La Crosse, Wisconsin, and were then brewed at Heileman's Evansville, Indiana, brewery (the former Sterling Breweries facility) and at its Newport, Kentucky, brewery, formerly known as the George Wiedemann Brewery. G. Heileman also launched a low calorie version of Falls City, called Falls City Light. Louisville residents did not take kindly to the fact that their hometown beer was no longer being brewed in Louisville. Many longtime drinkers immediately swore off Falls City for that reason.

=== Post-closing brands ===
After the G. Heileman Brewing Company announced that it would close its Evansville brewery, the Falls City brand was purchased by a group of investors seeking to keep the Evansville brewery in operation. The new company became known as the Evansville Brewing Company and sought to reinvigorate the Falls City name, especially in its home market of Louisville. The brewery launched Drummond Bros. Light in an effort to attract more drinkers to that brand. Under Evansville's stewardship, Drummond Bros. won a gold medal at the 1993 Great American Beer Festival in Denver. Evansville's other brands included Sterling, Sterling Light, Wiedemann, Drewrys, Drewrys Lite & Low, Cook's, Cook's Light, Gerst and The Eagle Malt Liquor.

Evansville Brewing ultimately closed in 1997 and the Falls City brand was purchased by Pittsburgh Brewing Company, which produced the brand until around 2007. Since 2010, the brand name "Falls City Beer" has been used for a beer contract brewed at Sand Creek Brewing Company for a Louisville computer software entrepreneur.

== See also ==
- History of Louisville, Kentucky
- List of defunct breweries in the United States
