= Schmidt Artist Lofts =

Historic former brewery in Minneapolis, Minnesota, U.S.

Coordinates: 44°55′43″N 93°7′25″W

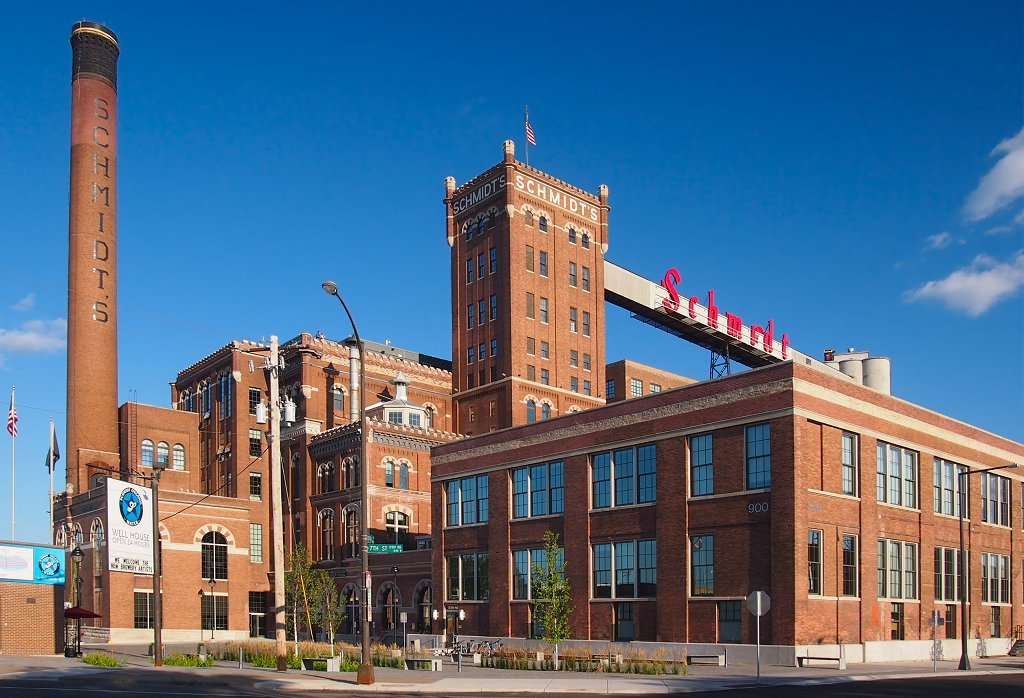
- Schmidt Artist Lofts from the northwest
- Interactive map of the Schmidt Artist Lofts area
- Former names: Schmidt Brewery

General information
- Location: West Seventh, Saint Paul, Ramsey County, Minnesota, 900, 876 7th St W, St. Paul, MN, United States
- Current tenants: Affordable Artist Rental Lofts
- Construction started: 1855

Design and construction
- Architect: Bernard Barthel

The Schmidt Artist Lofts is a historic former brewery for Schmidt Brewery. It is located in the West Seventh neighborhood of Saint Paul, Minnesota, United States. The building was vacant for 11 years until a community and developer effort resulted in a plan for a revitalization of the brewery's historic building into the creation of the Schmidt Artist Lofts in 2013.

== History ==
=== 19th century ===
In 1855, Christopher Stahlmann moved to St. Paul, Minnesota and opened the largest brewery in Minnesota originally known as the Cave Brewery. It was named the "Cave Brewery" because Stahlmann created an extensive lagering cave directly below the brewery, known as "Stahlmann's Cellars". The cave is located 20 to 30 feet (6.1 to 9.1 m) below street level, and its total length measures one-half mile (0.80 km), making it the most extensive brewery cave in Minnesota.

Christopher Stahlmann died of "inflammation of the bowels" in 1883. The Cave Brewery Christopher had built was left to his sons. However, each one of them perished from tuberculosis. The Cave Brewery went bankrupt in 1897.

=== 20th century ===
In 1900, Jacob Schmidt, a Bavarian born brewer, purchased Stahlmann's Brewery, to relocate his recently burned down North Star Brewery at Dayton's Bluff. Schmidt began an expansion project that included forced-air drying and modern mechanical refrigeration that replaced the need for Stahlmann's lagering caves. Schmidt also employed the help of Chicago architect, Bernard Barthel, to add the "feudal castle style" to the expanded brewery.

Jacob Schmidt died in 1910 and left the brewery to his partners, Otto and Adolf Bremer. The Bremer brothers led the brewery to be one of the leading regional beer producers in the country.

With the onset of Prohibition in 1919, The Schmidt Brewery began producing soft drinks and a successful near-beer called Select. Schmidt Beer was also delivered to the underworld's Green Lantern Saloon by secret tunnel to a Schmidt employee's house on Erie Street.

When Prohibition was repealed in 1933, the Schmidt Brewery resumed production of beer, and within 3 years claimed to be the 7th largest brewery in the United States, employing 400 workers and brewing over 200 types of beers. According to architectural historian Paul Clifford Larson, Schmidt Brewery was a key contributor to getting the St. Paul community out of the depression. Larson wrote:

The brewery industry was also a key player in the emergence of St. Paul from each of the major economic depressions between 1875 and 1930…. The vigorous activity of the brewing industry at the turn of the century occurred in spite of a growing temperance movement in the state. Newspaper articles celebrating St. Paul's emergence from the economic depression listed every leading industry but the one that had made the most investment was the Schmidt Brewery.

The success of the Brewery helped make the Bremers one of the wealthiest families in Minnesota – and targets to kidnappers. In 1934, Adolf's son Edward Bremer was kidnapped by the Barker-Karpis Gang. Edward was released after the payment of a $200,000 ransom (equivalent to $4.8 million in 2025).

Adolf Bremer died in 1939, while Otto carried on as president until his own death in 1951. After their deaths, the brewery began its first of many economically challenging periods. By 1955, the company finally succumbed to its losses and sold the operation to a Pfeiffer Brewing Company from Detroit. The St. Paul branch of the Pfeiffer Brewing Co. enjoyed nearly two decades of success, employing new marketing and advertising campaigns including the introduction of the scenic can series created by famous Minnesota artist Leslie Kouba. The G. Heileman Brewing Company of LaCrosse, Wisconsin bought the brewery in 1972. Under new management, the brewery became the fourth-largest brewery in the United States by 1981. In 1987, however, Alan Bond, an Australian corporate raider, purchased the brewery. Under Bond's management, the brewery did not have much success and was forced to close in 1990, despite the efforts of St. Paul's city leaders to preserve the business and the hundreds of jobs that were lost.

=== 1991–2002 ===
Barren for more than a year, The Minnesota Brewing Company gained approval to purchase the brewery in 1991. With its new Landmark and Pig's Eye Pilsner brands, and an updated Grain Belt brand, the company experienced a brief but fruitful period of success. The success did not last for long due to the cost of the renovations, including taking down the old lighted Schmidt sign and replacing it with a Landmark sign. Old inadequate equipment and the competition of major national brands also contributed to their demise

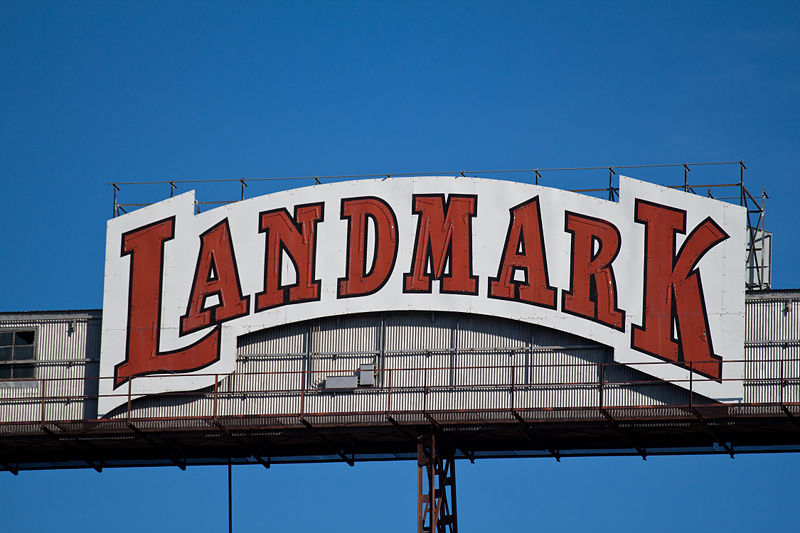
The Landmark sign that replaced the Schmidt Sign in 1991

The company in management during this time decided to join a growing movement towards producing fuels from grains. They opened the Gopher State Ethanol Company on site of the brewery. The ethanol company fermented corn to alcohol, causing an even more odorous process than brewing beer. Gopher State Ethanol Company triggered many complaints and lawsuits from the surrounding neighborhood due to this odor. With the lawsuits and substantial annual losses, the brewery was forced to close in 2002, ending 147 years of brewing at the historical site.

=== Present day ===
On November 12, 2012, a Plymouth-based developer, Dominium, came to an agreement to purchase the historic and iconic brewery. Dominium bought the old Schmidt bottling house, the grain silos, and the brew house – commonly known as "the castle" – as well as eight of the 15 acres (6.1 ha) for $6.2 million from Twin Cities businessmen Bruce Hendry and Glen D. Nelson. The $123 million development plan included 147 rental units in the brew house and another 100 rental units in the bottle house, with a majority of the units being intended for low-income artist. Dominium also built 13 new three-bedroom townhouses adjacent to the bottle house.

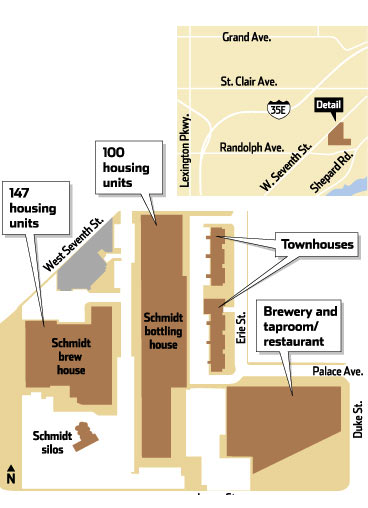
Layout of the Schmidt Artist Lofts

The Saint Paul City Council authorized a $69.3 million in conduit bonds for the Schmidt Artist Lofts project. Additionally, Dominium received affordable-housing tax credits and state and federal historical tax credits for the restoration of a historical building. The total amount of tax credits for the received for the project, including the low-income housing, came to approximately $70 million.

The historic preservation of the original Schmidt Brewery was crucial in the renovation process. The brewery has been noted by architectural historians for its crenellated towers and Gothic designs, both of which are still intact today. The Schmidt sign that was originally on the connector to the silos was redone with LED lights and replaced the Landmark sign during renovations. Some of the brewery's old tanks were incorporated into the new design as lighting fixtures.
