= Stage 7 =

- Genre: Drama, Anthology
- Country of origin: United States
- Original language: English
- No. of seasons: 1
- No. of episodes: 25

Production
- Running time: 25 minutes excluding ads

Original release
- Network: CBS
- Release: January 30 – September 25, 1955

Stage 7 is a 30-minute American TV drama anthology series that was broadcast on CBS from December 12, 1954, through September 25, 1955. This program premiered in December 1954 with the title Your Favorite Playhouse with all episodes being repeats from other series, but later featured original episodes.

Don Rickles's first dramatic appearance on TV was in the May 15, 1955, episode, "A Note of Fear". Other actors who appeared on the program included Dennis Morgan, Charles Bronson, Edmond O'Brien, Gene Barry, Phyllis Coates, Frances Rafferty, Macdonald Carey, and Phyllis Thaxter.

The program was filmed in Hollywood, with Warren Lewis as producer. Some directing was done by Quinn Martin.

When Stage 7 went into syndication, in some parts of the United States sponsors changed the title to indicate their sponsorship. The first to do so was Standard Oil of California, which used the name Chevron Hall of Stars in its markets. Drewry's Beer signed Don Ameche as host and changed the title to Don Ameche Presents the Drewry's Play of the Week in its 11 market areas in the Midwest.

== Episodes ==
- Episode 1: The Deceiving Eye
- Episode 2: Appointment in Highbridge
- Episode 3: The Legacy
- Episode 4: Debt of Honor - February 20, 1955
- Episode 5: Tiger at Noon
- Episode 6: To Kill a Man
- Episode 7: The Greatest Man in the World
- Episode 8: The Press Conference
- Episode 9: The Long Count
- Episode 10: Down from the Stars
- Episode 11: Young Girl in an Apple Tree
- Episode 12: Emergency
- Episode 13: The Magic Hat - George Brent
- Episode 14: Armed
- Episode 15: Billy and the Bride
- Episode 16: A Note of Fear - May 15, 1955
- Episode 17: The Verdict
- Episode 18: The Time of the Day
- Episode 19: Yesterday's Pawnshop
- Episode 20: The Traveling Salesman
- Episode 21: End of the Line
- Episode 22: Debt to a Stranger
- Episode 23: Where You Loved Me
- Episode 24: The Hayfield
- Episode 25: The Fox Hunt
