= Evansville Brewing Company =

- U.S. National Register of Historic Places
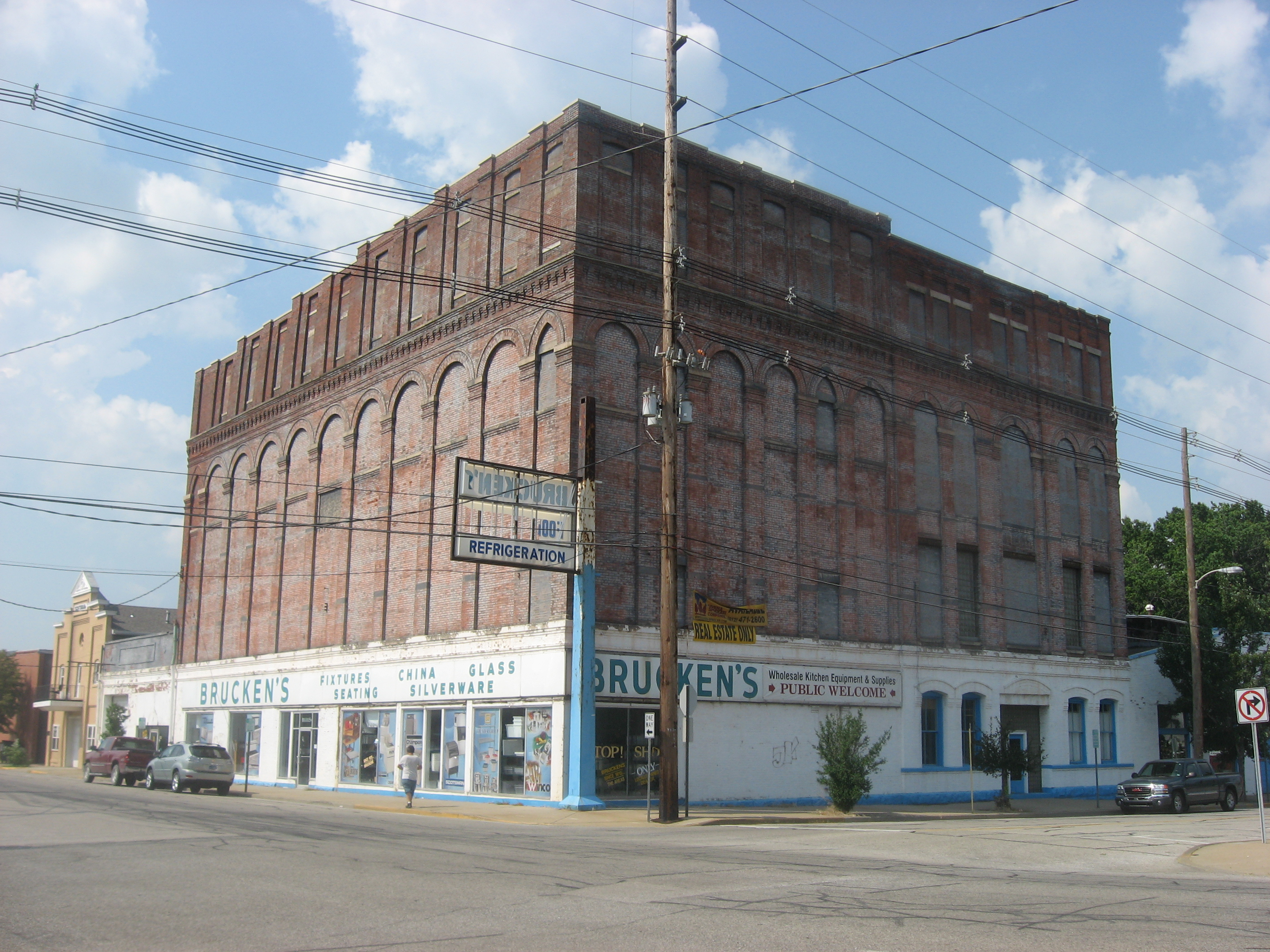
- Evansville Brewing Company, July 2011

- Location within Indiana Location within the United States
- Location: 401 NW 4th St., Evansville, Indiana
- Coordinates: 37°58′22″N 87°34′22″W
- Area: less than one acre
- Built: 1891-1893
- Architectural style: Romanesque Revival
- MPS: Downtown Evansville MRA
- NRHP reference No.: 82000091
- Added to NRHP: July 1, 1982

Evansville Brewing Company is a historic brewery located in downtown Evansville, Indiana at the corner of NW 4th Street and Ingle Street. It was built between 1891 and 1893, and is a four-story, Romanesque Revival style brick building.

It was listed on the National Register of Historic Places in 1982.

== History ==
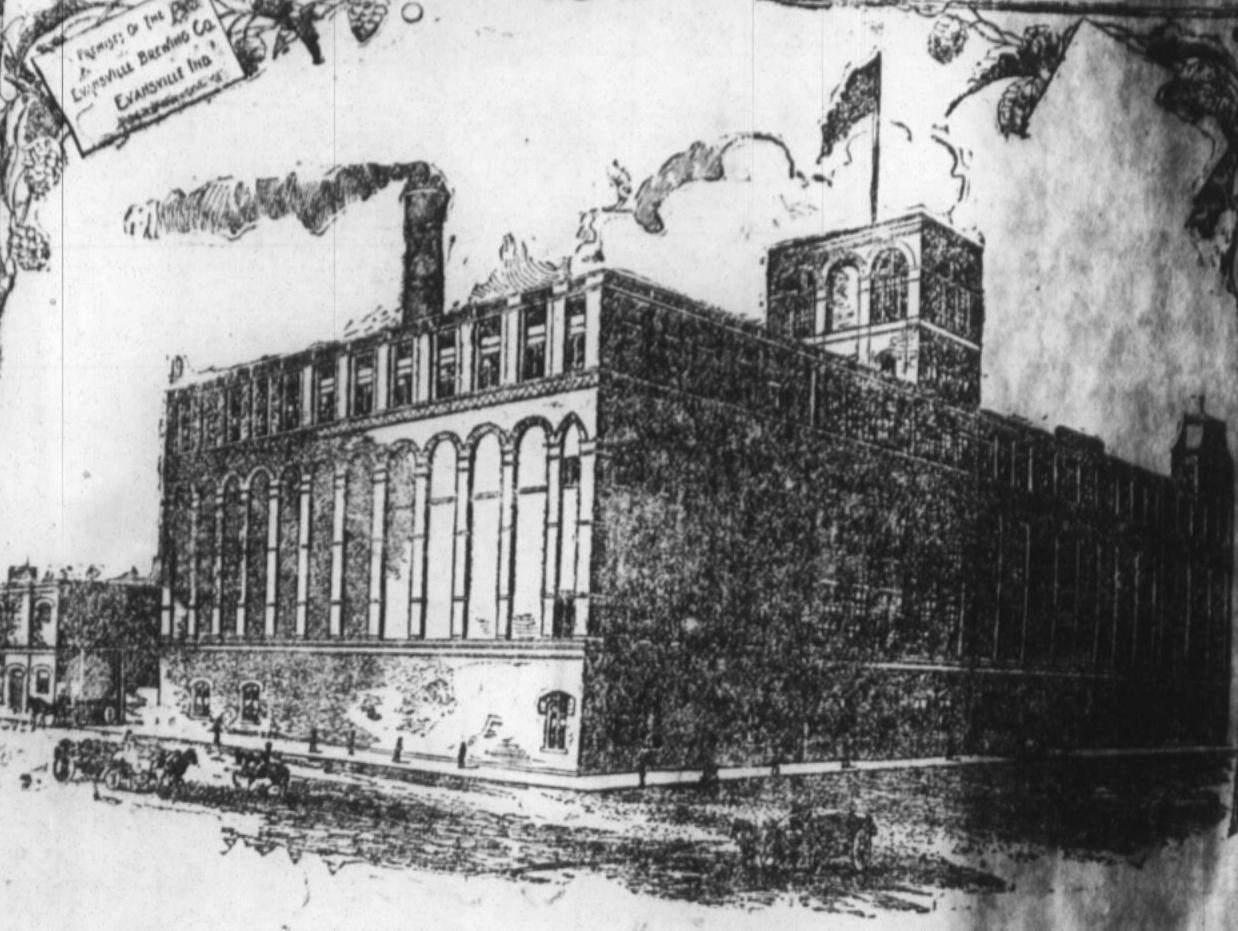
Advertisement for Evansville Brewing Co., 1891

The Evansville Brewery, led by Henry Wimberg, opened in 1891. In 1893, the Evansville Brewery joined with Hartmetz and Son Brewery, and Fulton Avenue Brewery to form the Evansville Brewing Association. The combination allowed for a 150,000 barrel per year production capacity. The Association filed a mortgage of $600,000 on the plant in 1894 to Henry L. Cook of the First National Bank. Brewing activities stopped at this location in April 1918 as a result of prohibition.

The Cudahy Packing Company purchased the building from the Evansville Brewing Association in 1916 to convert into a meat packing plant. The building was used for the cold storage of eggs and butter for the region.

Charles and Otto Hartmetz opened the Dixie Motors automobile dealership in the building in 1918. The dealership was renamed Vandeveer Dodge in the late 1940s before moving away in the late 1960s.

By the time the building was nominated for the National Register of Historic Places in Indiana in 1981, a restaurant supply company, Brucken's, was located at 4th and Ingle.

== Beers ==
Evansville Brewing Co. advertised a Minnehaha beer in the August 30, 1891 "Evansville Courier." Minnehaha or "Laughing Water" made Evansville Brewing a leader in the city. Their Union Bock beer when on sail April 1, 1893. In March 1898 they advertised with the Fulton Avenue Brewery the release of a Bock beer.

By 1908 the brewery was making a "non-intoxicating drink similar to the so-called temperance beverages on the market." Jingo, Evansville Brewing's temperance drink, was trialed in Frankfort, Indiana related to legal investigations.

== Note ==
This building is located at 401 NW 4th Street in Evansville and should not be confused with a former brewery located at 1301 Pennsylvania Avenue. The 1301 Pennsylvania Avenue building opened in the 1880s and was known as Fulton Avenue Brewery, was renamed Sterling Products Company during prohibition, then Sterling Brewers after prohibition. G. Heileman Brewing Company acquired the Pennsylvania Ave. location in the 1970s before selling to local investors who opened the Evansville Brewing Company in 1988.

== See also ==
- National Register of Historic Places listing in Indiana
- List of defunct breweries in the United States
- List of breweries in Indiana
