= Muessel-Drewry Brewery =

- Muessel-Drewry's Brewery
- U.S. National Register of Historic Places
- U.S. Historic district
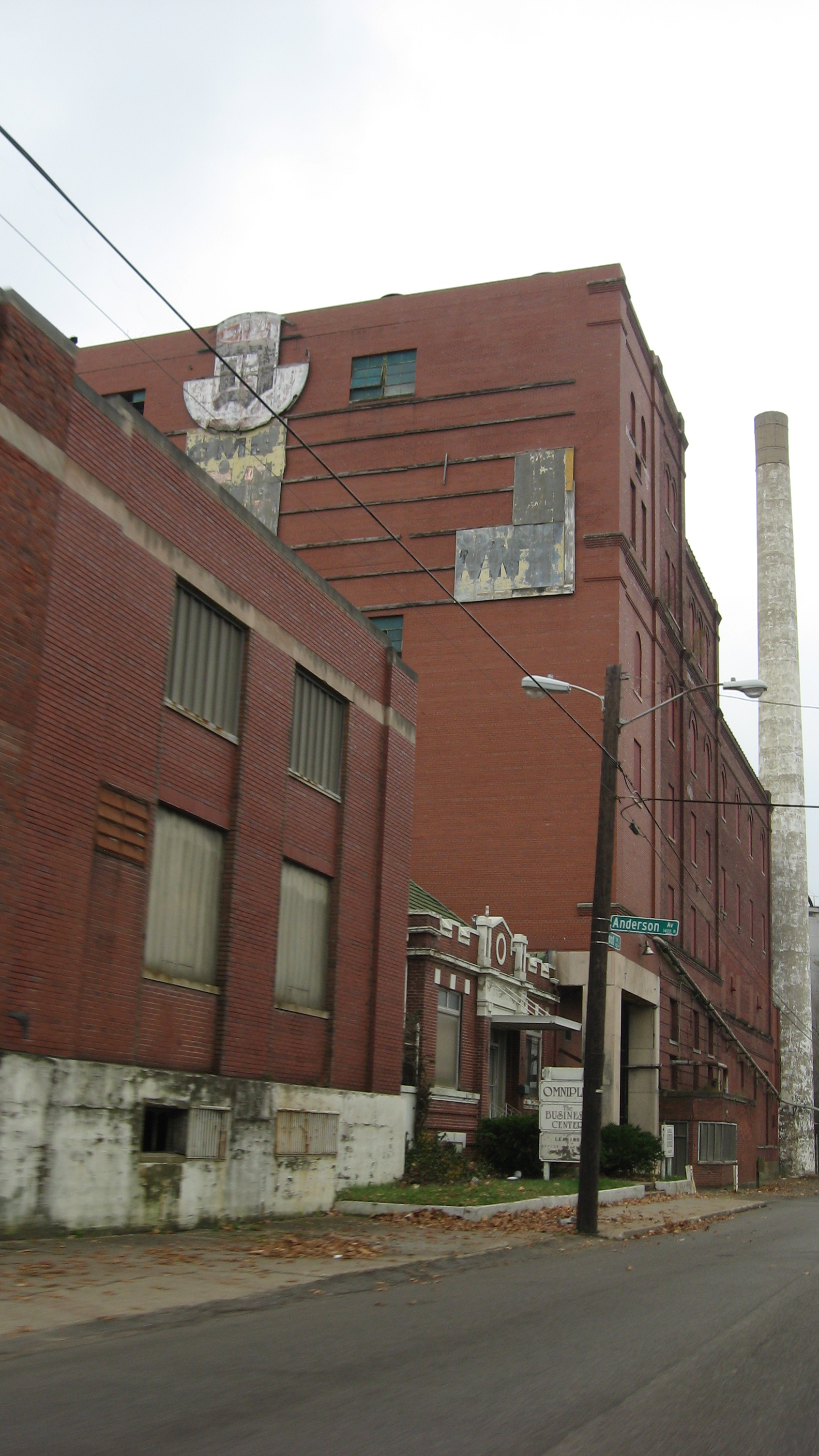
- Muessel-Drewry's Brewery, November 2013

- Location within Indiana Location within the United States
- Location: 1408 Elwood Ave., South Bend, Indiana
- Coordinates: 41°41′37″N 86°16′16″W
- Area: 11 acres (4.5 ha)
- NRHP reference No.: 00001543
- Added to NRHP: December 28, 2000

Muessel-Drewry Brewery is a historic brewery complex and National historic district located off the crossroads of Portage Road and Elwood Avenue in South Bend, Indiana. It originally encompassed seven contributing buildings and two contributing structures, listed as a series of grain silos as one structure and a smoke stack as the other.

The property was listed on the National Register of Historic Places in 2000.

== History ==
=== Muessel Brewing Company ===
The brewery developed between about 1865 and 1949, and consists of a mix of industrial buildings that are made of period brick from their respective era, as well as pole barn outbuildings and a series of grain silos and a large smoke stack. The buildings are associated with Christopher Muessel, a German immigrant, who was known for his forward thought in developing brewing technology and processes, and what later became Muessel Brewing Company, ran by Muessel's kin upon his passing.

The Muessel Brewing Company came to state attention when on the evening of December 30, 1915 five masked men entered the building, held the owner Henry Muessel (aged 35), Robert Muessel (aged 17), William Muessel Jr. (aged 20), and Frank Chrobot (aged 45) at gunpoint and robbed the money room. Henry Muessel and Frank Chrobot died from gunshot wounds before the police arrived, William Muessel Jr. was also shot, while Robert Muessel was able to escape and find help.

Muessel Brewing continued until 1933 as a product of not being able to survive as a non-alcoholic beverage company in the prohibition era in the United States.

The Muessel family was a significant contributor to the growth of what is now known as District 2 in South Bend. In addition to the hundreds of homes that provided housing for staff, the family also contributed the largest park in the area, as well as a local school, both of which are still in existence today, Muessel Grove Park and Muessel Elementary School. The family also was a local sponsor of South Bend's professional football team, the Muessel Brewers, which was coach by football legend and local hero Knute Rockne to an undefeated season while Rockne had an all-star senior year as Captain of the Football team at neighboring University of Notre Dame.

=== Drewry's Brewing Company ===
Post prohibition, Drewrys, a Canadian brewing company, purchased the site and resumed brewing. From 1936 to early 1972 Drewry's operated as the largest distributor of any of the South Bend/Mishawaka breweries. In June 1972, G. Heilman Brewing Company bought Drewry's from its parent firm; and brewing at the South Bend plant ceased in September of that year. The complex went through a series of owners since 1972 and was largely scrapped until it was purchased in late December 2014 by an Arizona-based owner who purchased the site.

=== National Register of Historic Places ===
In 2016, the city of South Bend officials deemed several buildings to be structurally unsound and publicly stated that for 44 years the buildings ordered to come down have been unsafe. Several of the structures ordered by the city to come down were part of the National Register of Historic Places. Also in 2016, the owner commenced abatement which would become of one of the largest asbestos removals in the region and clearing the site of asbestos that had been left to deteriorate in condition by former owners. Various structures were demolished in 2017. After asbestos clearing funded by the United States Environmental Protection Agency in 2023, the city demolished the rest of the structures except one smokestack in 2024. In 2026 the city announced that it planned to build a mixed-use development on the site.

== See also ==
- National Register of Historic Places listing in Indiana
- List of defunct breweries in the United States
- List of breweries in Indiana
