= Sterling Brewers =

Former brewery with long history

Sterling Brewers Incorporated
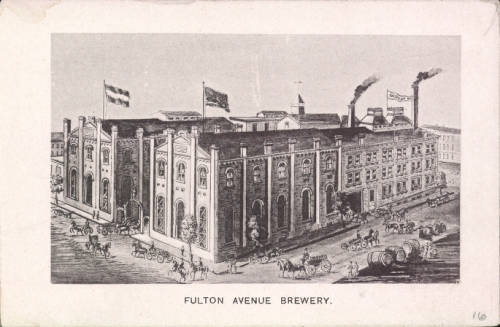
- Sketch of Fulton Avenue Brewery (1888)
- Type: Private
- Industry: Alcoholic beverage
- Predecessor: Evansville Brewing Association; Fulton Avenue Brewery
- Founded: 1863
- Successor: Evansville Brewing Company; G. Heileman Brewing Company
- Area served: Midwest, Southern US
- Products: Beer

Sterling Brewers (also known as Fulton Avenue Brewery or Evansville Brewing Company) was a historic brewery once located in Evansville, Indiana at the corner of Pennsylvania Avenue and Fulton Avenue. The company changed hands several times in its 135-year history, but produced drink products the entire time. The building housed the Evansville Brewing Association prior to prohibition, when it shifted to making soft drinks before returning to beer as Sterling Brewers in 1933. Production continued under G. Heileman Brewing Company and then local investors renamed it to Evansville Brewing Company. The buildings were dismantled in 1998.

== History ==
The building opened in 1863 and changed ownership multiple times before being dismantled in 1998:

- Early days (1863–1877)
- Fulton Avenue Brewery (1877–1894)
- Evansville Brewing Association (1894–1918)
- Sterling Products Company (1918–1933)
- Sterling Brewers (1933–1972)
- G. Heileman Brewing Company (1972–1988)
- Evansville Brewing Company (1988–1997)

=== Early days (1863–1877) ===
Henry Schneider purchased the land for $1,750 and built a brewery on it. After the Civil War, Schneider sold the property for $6,450.

=== Fulton Avenue Brewery (1877–1894) ===
Charles William Ullmer, who came to the US from Russia in 1868, and Ferdinand Hoedt, who immigrated to the US in 1865, purchased the brewery location locally known as "the Old Brewery" for $45,000 and began expanding the location into the Fulton Avenue Brewery in November 1877. The first beer was served on December 31, 1877. The building grew to include a brew plant, ice machinery, beer bottling facilities, and other buildings related to brewing. The factory was the first building in Evansville to have electrical lighting installed in 1880. The plant produced 65,000 barrels of beer per year by 1894.

=== Evansville Brewing Association (1894–1918) ===
Fulton Avenue Brewery joined with the Evansville Brewing Company and John Hartmetz & Son Brewery to incorporate as the Evansville Brewing Association in 1894. The merger increased production capacity to 150,000 barrels per year. The Brewing Association's main headquarters was managed out of this building. The officers for the Association were Henry Wimberg of the Evansville Brewing Company, president; C. F Hartmetz of the Hartmetz & Son Brewery, first vice-president and secretary; Gus Meyer, second vice-president; and Charles William Ullmer of the Fulton Avenue Brewery, treasurer. Production by 1910 was 20,000 barrels per year, employing 250 people. Production by 1917 was up to 211,537 barrels per year.

=== Sterling Products Company (1918–1933) ===
After the passage of prohibition in Indiana and implementation in 1918, the company shifted to making soft drinks. The company renamed itself to Sterling Products Company where it made soft drinks and malt extracts.

=== Sterling Brewers (1933–1972) ===
The company renamed to Sterling Brewers Incorporated in 1933 when prohibition ended. Sterling Brewers leadership included Charles F. Hartmetz, Chaiman of the Board of Directors and Henry A. Wimberg, brewmaster. The plant included a 425 barrel kettle, pumps, refrigeration, and bottling equipment. The capacity was 250,000 barrels per year. Sterling Brewers used United Beverage, Inc. to distribute their Sterling brand in the late 1930s. By September 1936, the company reported a profit of $458,539 or $0.92 per share. The name changed to Sterling Brewers Association in 1964 and by 1965 Sterling Brewers was a division of Associated Brewing Company, a regional brewery in Detroit.

=== G. Heileman Brewing Company (1972–1988) ===
The G. Heileman Brewing Company bought the company in 1972 where the plant was used to make brands from breweries around the state. The company reported more than $1 billion in sales in 1983. Heileman sold the brewery in 1988.

=== Evansville Brewing Company (1988–1997) ===
The new owners John Durnin, Mark Mattingly, and John Bzeznski opened the Evansville Brewing Company on September 21, 1988. The company originally focused on producing "value-priced" beers but began shifting towards a "premium" market, aligning with the growing craft beer trend of the early 1990s. By 1995 the company employed around 100 people and produced 500,000 barrels per year. 40% of that beer was sent overseas, selling to places in Brazil, Japan, and Great Britain. In May 1997, Steve Cook replaced Mark Mattingly as President and CEO of the company. By October 1997 the brewery declared bankruptcy and closed. It was the last of the large-scale production brewery plants in Indiana. At time of closure, the brewery employed 80 people and produced 900,000 barrels per year. The Sterling brand was sold to Pittsburgh Brewing Company in January 1998.

The buildings began being dismantled for parts in 1998 and were rezoned for lighter industrialization. One of the partially demolished building caught fire in November 1998 while a few of the smaller buildings were reused for office space.

== Beers ==
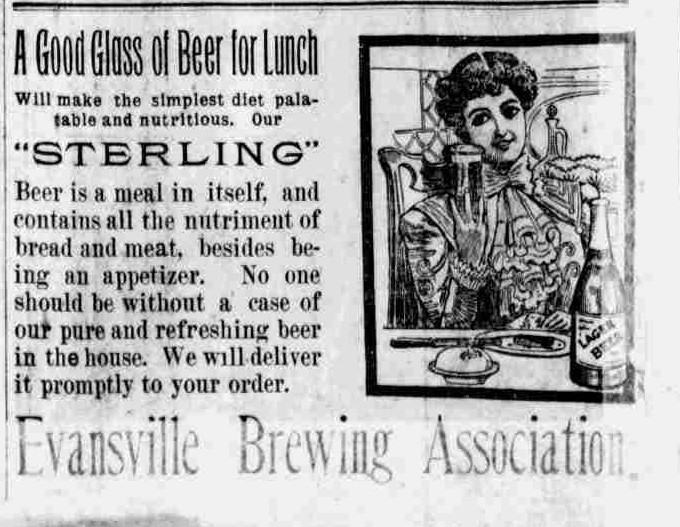
1901 Evansville Brewing Association advertisement: "A good glass of beer for lunch"

By 1894, Fulton Avenue Brewery was known for Rheingold. Soon after incorporation, the Evansville Brewing Association was advertising the beers previously made by the companies: Reingold from Fulton Avenue, Minnehaha from Evansville Brewing, and Hartmetz from Hartmetz & Son Brewery.

By the turn of the 20th century, Evansville Brewing Association advertised Sterling beer products as a "meal in itself." As Sterling Brewers Inc., the company distributed the Sterling brand to central and southern US, including New Orleans and Atlanta after prohibition ended. After the local Cook's plant closed in 1955, Sterling began producing Cook's in 1963 with consultation from the former brewmasters.

The Heileman facility acquired the Red, White & Blue Beer in 1983. They produced 13 name brands and 6 light varieties including Sterling, Blatz, Cook's, Falls City, Drury, Schmidt, Red White & Blue, Wiedemann, Pfeiffer, Drummond Bros., Carling Black Label, Colt 45, and Mickey Malt Liquor.

In 1992 the Evansville Brewing Company released Gerst Amber Lager based on a recipe from Gerst Brewing Company from Nashville, Tennessee which closed in 1954. Other brands produced by Eavnsville Brewing Company in 1993 were Sterling, Wiedemann, Falls City, Birrell, John Gilbert's, Drury, and Cook's, each with a corresponding Light version. Evansville Brewing Company won gold for Dummond Bros. and Birrell N/A at the 1993 Great American Beer Festival, bronze for Eagle Malt Liquor in the American Specialty Lager category in 1996, and gold again for Drummond Bros. in the American-style Lager category in 1997.

After bankrupting in 1997 Evansville Brewing Company sold their brands, including Sterling, to Pittsburgh Brewing Company. Upon Pittsburgh Brewing's bankruptcy in 2005, the brand was acquired by Todd Jackson of Louisville who created Sterling Brewing of Louisville in 2012. Jackson partnered with Upland Brewing Company of Bloomington to produce Sterling beer from an all-new pilsner recipe the same year.

== Note ==
This former building located on Fulton Avenue should not be confused with the original Evansville Brewing Company located at 401 NW 4th Street in Evansville. The 4th Street location opened in 1891 and was listed on the National Register of Historic Places in 1982.

== See also ==
- List of defunct breweries in the United States
- List of breweries in Indiana
