= Russell G. Cleary =

American lawyer

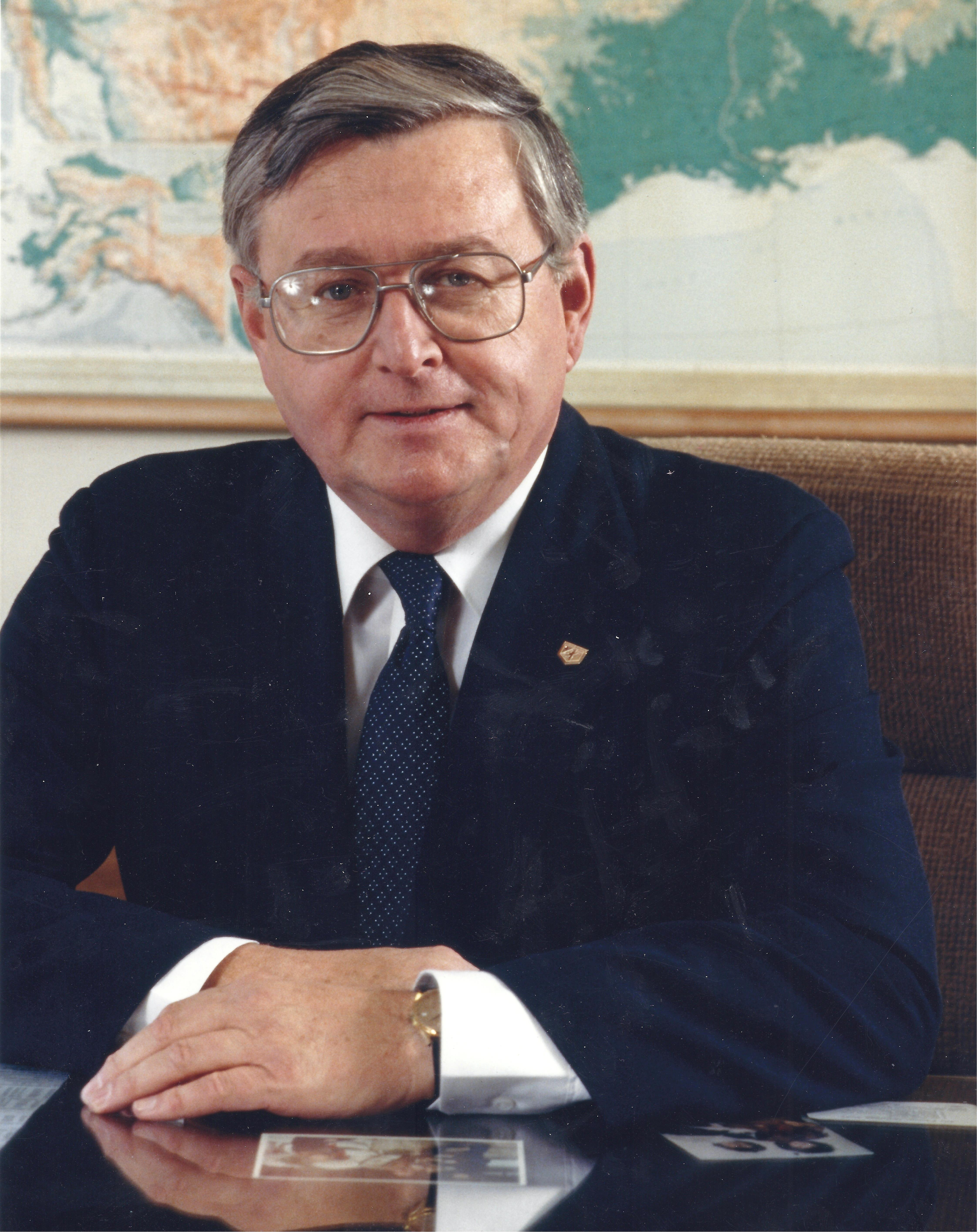
- Born: May 22, 1933; Chippewa Falls, Wisconsin
- Died: May 1, 1997 (aged 63); La Crosse, Wisconsin
- Education: University of Wisconsin-Madison
- Occupation: President of the G. Heileman Brewing Company
- Years active: 1971-1989, 1994-1997
- Spouse: Gail Cleary (1955)
- Children: Kristine Cleary, Sandra Cleary
- Relatives: Roy Kumm, father-in-law, Lillian Hope Kumm, mother-in-law

Russell G. Cleary (May 22, 1933 – May 1, 1997) was an American brewer who was known for building the G. Heileman Brewing Company from the 15th in the brewing industry up to 4th during his tenure as president and CEO of the company from 1971 to 1989.

== Background ==
Cleary was born in Chippewa Falls, Wisconsin. Both his parents died when he was young, and he went to live with his aunt and grandmother in La Crosse. While there he attended Franklin Elementary School, and Logan Junior and Senior High Schools. While at Logan he was editor of the school's yearbook and a leader on its debate team. Following graduation he attended the University of La Crosse three year pre-law program, and was accepted to the University of Wisconsin Law School in 1954, graduating in 1957. Cleary had intended to move to Reedsburg, Wisconsin, to begin a law practice, but he and his wife, the daughter of a top executive at the G. Heileman Brewery in La Crosse, returned to their home town and he began working in real estate law.

== G. Heileman Brewing Company ==
Roy Kumm became president of the G. Heileman Brewing Company in 1957 and Cleary began working occasionally with Kumm on labor negotiations and business acquisitions.

Cleary joined Heileman full-time as legal counsel for the company in 1960. Only four years after working at Heileman, he was promoted to vice president and general counsel of the company. At that point he was in charge of labor relations; acquisitions; integration of acquired firms; supervision of legal matters; divisional advertising; and company-owned real estate.

In 1967 Cleary was named to the board of directors. Kumm resigned as president of the company in 1971 for health reasons, and died only months later. Elected to replace him, Cleary continued his path, engineering Heileman's 1972 purchase of Associated Brewing. The deal brought with it several subsidiary brewing companies, which catapulted Heileman from 15 to 8th in the industry and led to its stock debuting on the New York Stock Exchange in May 1973. Cleary used such momentum to make even more acquisitions, seeking to turn his vision of Heileman's being the only brewery in America large enough to take on Anheuser-Busch and Miller for primacy in the American brewing industry into reality.

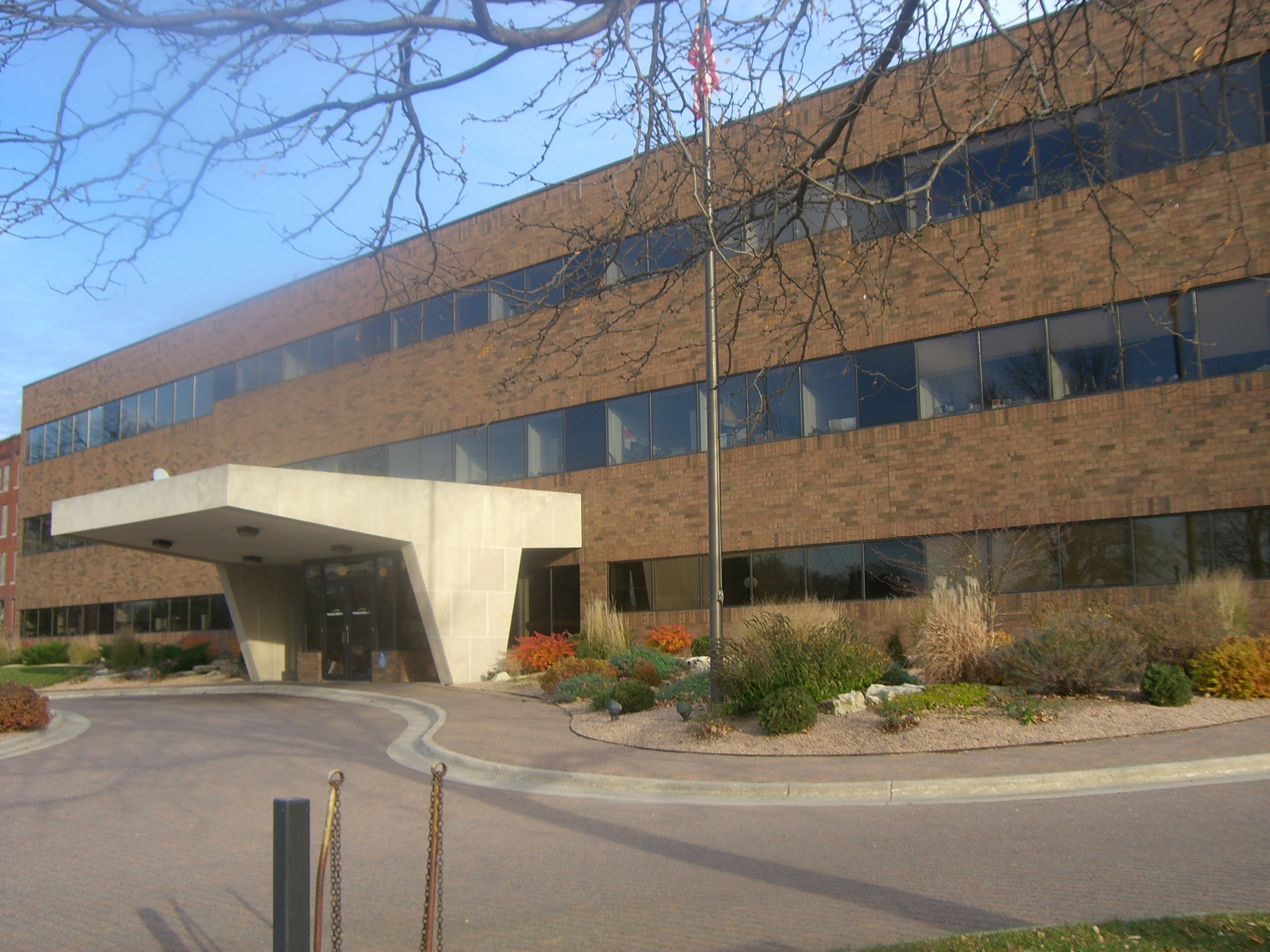
The front entrance of 100 Harborview Drive in La Crosse, Wisconsin. Once the corporate headquarters of the G. Heileman Brewing Company

In particular, Cleary continued the company's campaign of acquiring failing breweries, making several significant deals. In 1977, Heileman purchased the Rainier brands and plant in Seattle, Washington. There was a deal in 1979 to acquire the Carling brands and several plants (Frankenmuth, Michigan; Baltimore, Maryland; Belleville, Illinois; Phoenix, Arizona, among others, which Heileman quickly sold or liquidated). Several contracts in 1983 put Heileman under control of a plant in Perry, Georgia; San Antonio, Texas, where they also purchased the Lone Star brand; and the Blitz-Weinhard Brewery; and brands in Portland, Oregon. Cleary's last major brewery move came in 1986 when Heileman finished the construction on a Val Blatz Microbrewery in Milwaukee, Wisconsin to produce the Blatz brand, which they had purchased in 1969.

As a boss, Cleary was liked by his employees and wholesalers, having gone to high school with many of them. He was respected by his employees due to his union relations, as the union in La Crosse had some of the highest wages in the area. Many of his colleagues at Heileman and within the industry had positive things to say about Cleary.

"The best way for me to describe Russ Cleary is through comparison. I have to say without any qualifications that I have more respect for this man than any other man whom I've been associated with in this industry and there are a couple reasons. First, his aggressiveness and his strong will not to be intimidated, not to take a back seat or lose."

— John Pedace, Heileman's Vice President of Marketing

=== Awards ===
Due to his commitment to the company and the La Crosse community, over the years, Cleary received many awards. Among those from the La Crosse area and the numerous financial and business magazines were:

- 1969 - Awarded one of the 100 Outstanding Men of America by the Junior Chamber of Commerce
- 1979 - Awarded the #1 Citizen of the Year of the City of La Crosse by the Mayor and City Council
- 1980 - Awarded the Executive of the Year Award by Corporate Report Magazine
- 1986 - Awarded the Entrepreneur of the year Award by Arthur Young
- 1987 - Awarded the CEO of the Year Beverage Industry Bronze Award by Financial World Magazine
- 1993 - Inducted to the Boys and Girls Club Wall of Fame

== Retirement ==
One of the stipulations of the Bond Corporation acquisition was that Cleary stay on as head of the company through a transition to new ownership. After an additional two years, Cleary announced his retirement in 1989. When Alan Bond went bankrupt and was forced to sell Heileman to Hicks, Muse, Tate, and Furst in 1994 Cleary came out of retirement to guide the transaction. He remained with the company until it was sold to the Stroh Brewing Company in 1996.

Cleary died in May 1997 after complications from heart surgery.

=== Involvement ===
During his retirement, Cleary became involved in a number of new ventures, including opening a real estate company, called Cleary Management Inc., which he continued to run when he rejoined Heileman in 1994. However, he was involved in a number of other organizations throughout his career at Heileman, especially in the La Crosse area. His involvement included, but was not limited to:

Position	Organization	Time Range	Years with Org.
Director	Greater La Crosse Chamber of Commerce	1964-1968	4
Director	The National Bank of Wisconsin - La Crosse	1975-1975	10
Director, Vice President	La Crosse Festivals, Inc./Oktoberfest U.S.A	1966-1979	13
Director, President	Reorganized La Crosse Interstate Fair Association	1968-1972	4
Campaign Chairman, President	La Crosse Area United Way	1968-1970	2
Chairman	City of La Crosse Redevelopment Authority	1971-1973	2
Director	U.S.B.A/The Beer Institute	1971-1989	18
Director, member of executive committee	Protection Mutual Insurance Company	1974-1997	23
Director	Gundersen Medical Foundation	1975-1978	3
Director	9th District Federal Reserve Bank of Minneapolis	1975-1981	6
Director	The Trane Company	1978-1984	6
Director	University of Wisconsin - La Crosse Foundation, Inc.	1979-1985	6
Director	ECOLAB, Inc. of St. Paul, MN	1981-1997	16
Director	Norwest Bank Minneapolis, N.A	1981-1983	2
President's Club	Hamline University of St. Paul, MN	1981-1984	3
Director	WI Association of Manufacturers and Commerce	1983-1986	3
Director	A.O. Smith Company	1984-1997	13
Director	Soo Line Railroad Company	1984-1990	6
Member of the WI Strategic Development Commission	Wisconsin Government	1984-1986	2
Trustee	Wisconsin Alumni Research Foundation	1986-1997	11
Director	Robert W. Baird Capital Group	1986-1990	4
Director	The Company Store, Inc.	1989-1993	4
Chairman of the board, president	Cleary Management Corp.	1989-1997	8
Chairman of the board	First State Bancorp, Inc. of La Crosse, WI	1990-1997	7
Director	Kohler Company	1992-1994	2

== Personal life ==
Russell Cleary met Gail Kumm, daughter of future G. Heileman Brewing Company president Roy E. Kumm, when the pair were juniors in high school. They went on to marry in 1955, when Gail's father was a comptroller there. The couple had two children: Kristine, a lawyer; and Sandra, an accountant. Following Cleary's death in 1997, his wife and daughters took over control at Cleary Management.

Cleary was also very involved in Oktoberfest U.S.A, and was the Festmaster for the 1990 Oktoberfest.
