= Billy Beer =

Beer produced in the United States

- Official logo
- Manufacturer: Falls City Brewing Company; Cold Spring Brewing; West End Brewing; Pearl Brewing Company
- Introduced: July 1977; 49 years ago

Billy Beer was a brand of beer first made in the United States in July 1977, by the Falls City Brewing Company. It was promoted by Billy Carter, whose older brother Jimmy was then the president of the United States. In October 1978, Falls City announced that it was closing after less than a year of Carter's promotion. The beer was produced by Cold Spring Brewing, West End Brewing, and Pearl Brewing Company.

== Endorsement printed on beer cans ==
Written on each can were these words of endorsement, which were followed by Billy Carter's signature:

Brewed expressly for and with the personal approval of one of AMERICA's all-time Great Beer Drinkers—Billy Carter.

I had this beer brewed up just for me. I think it's the best I ever tasted. And I've tasted a lot. I think you'll like it, too.

Despite Carter's promotion of Billy Beer, "in private he drank Pabst".

== As a collectible ==
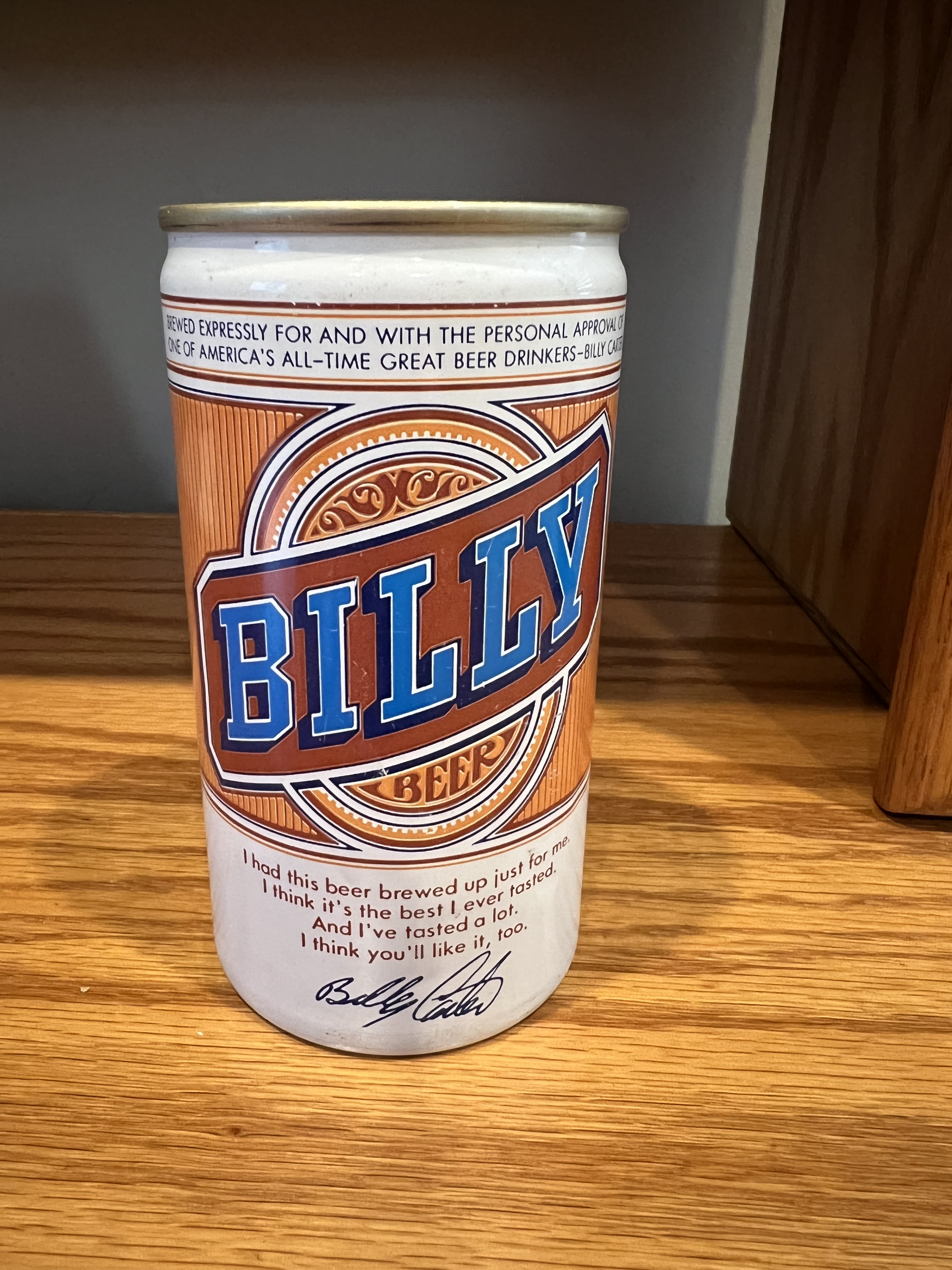
Billy Beer

After Billy Beer ceased production in 1978, advertisements appeared in newspapers offering to sell Billy Beer cans for several hundred to several thousands of dollars each, attempting to profit from their perceived rarity. However, since the cans were actually produced in the millions, the real value of a can ranged from 50 cents to one dollar in 1981.

== In popular media ==
In the 22nd episode of season 3 of The Simpsons, "The Otto Show," Homer Simpson pulls a can of Billy Beer from the pocket of his "concert-going jacket," presumably from the last concert he had attended when he was younger, and drinks the beer.

In the eighth episode of season 9 of The Simpsons, "Lisa the Skeptic," Homer is hoarding Billy Beer cans, anticipating that they will rise in value. He drinks one of the beers and says wistfully, "We elected the wrong Carter."

In the opening of Daffy Duck's Quackbusters, Daffy Duck works as a DeLorean salesman and offers "a free gift pack of ice-cold Billy Beer with each and every purchase."

In the episode "Shoeway to Heaven" of season 9 of Married... with Children, Al is dumbfounded and asks the reporter "well what happened in the seventies?" to which the reporter replies "the Ford Pinto, Diff'rent Strokes and Billy Beer."

In the Get a Life episode "1977 2000", Chris travels back in time to fix Gus' past where Gus and his friends are drinking Billy Beer.

Over ten songs about Billy Beer were released in the 1970s and early '80s.
