= Drewrys Brewing Company =

American brewery and beer company

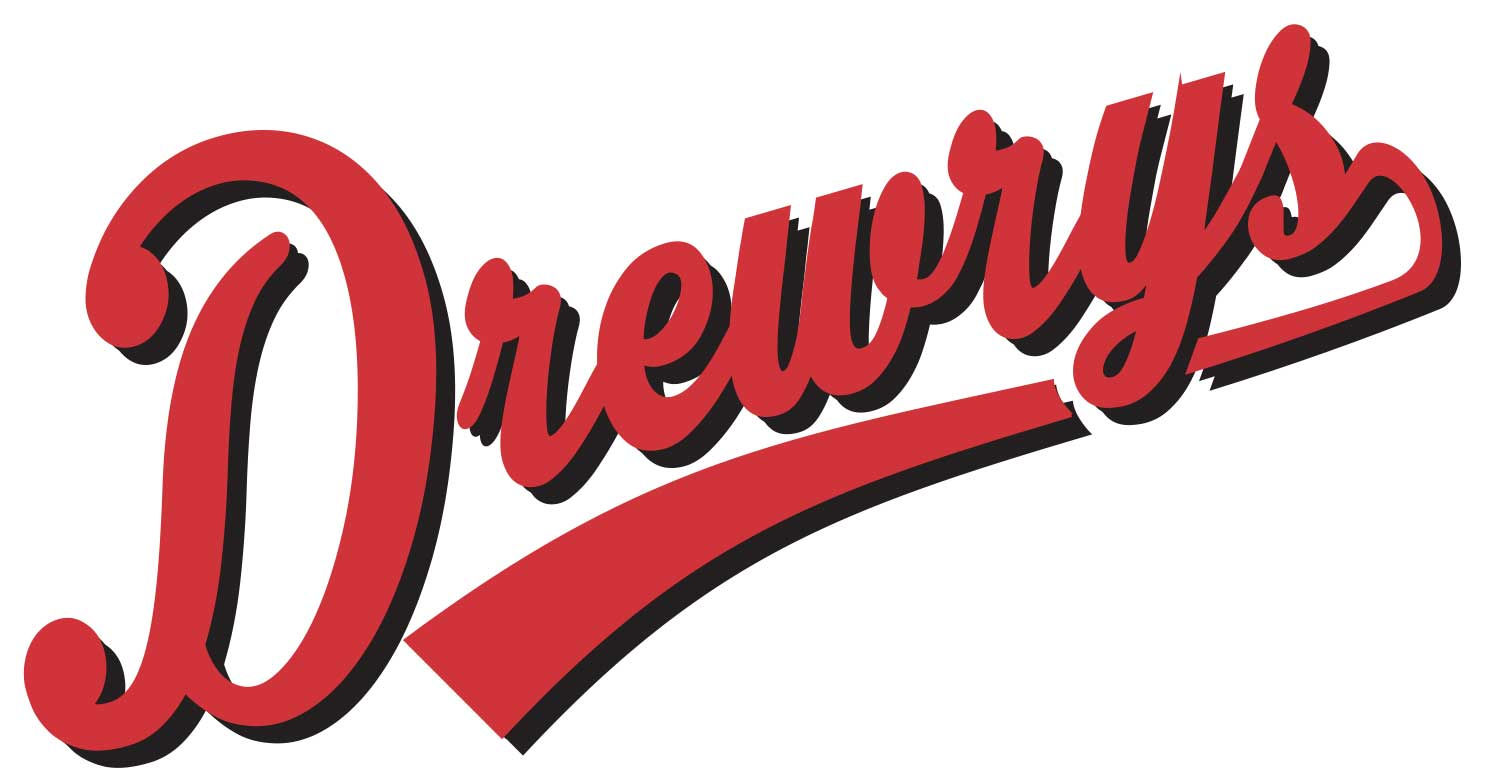
- Type: Private
- Industry: Beverages
- Founded: 1877
- Founder: E.L. Drewry
- Headquarters: P.O. Box 55; McHenry, Illinois; United States
- Products: Beer and Liquor
- Website: drewryscompany.com

Drewrys Brewing Company is an American brewery located in McHenry, Illinois founded in 1877.

Besides its Canadian connection (sometimes sporting a picture of a Mountie on cans or labels), the main Drewrys claims to fame were that the beer was "more flavor; less filling; more fun!", years before the popularity of light beers, and also (with the advent of lighter aluminum cans) that a can of Drewrys would float in water, rather than sinking to the bottom of a bucket or tub.

Other themes employed on Drewrys cans included sports scenes, and also zodiac graphics and trivia.

The South Bend-based brewery was merged with Associated Brew Co. in 1963, making the Associated/Drewry's plants one of the largest breweries in the U.S. The plant was sold to G. Heileman Brewing Company of La Crosse, Wisconsin, in 1972. Heileman eventually chose to close the plant. The last cases of beer left the South Bend plant in November 1972. The Muessel-Drewry Brewery at South Bend was listed on the National Register of Historic Places in 2000. Heileman owned the brand until it was sold to the Evansville Brewing Co. of Evansville, Indiana. This plant was closed in 1997 and the brand was bought along with others by Pittsburgh Brewing Company, though it was never manufactured.

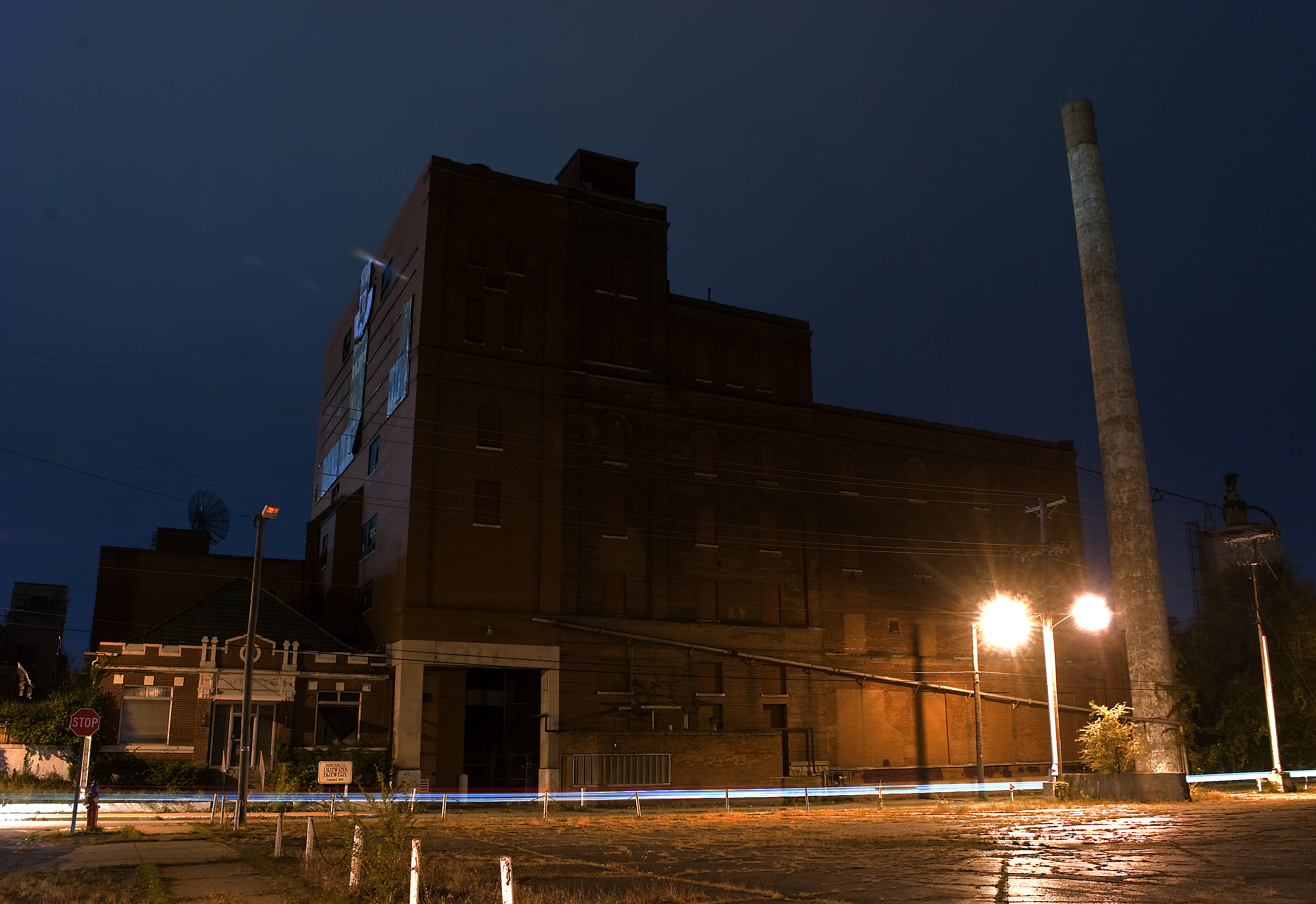
The Old Drewry's Brewery

Though Drewrys labelled beer last produced in 1997, Drewrys was purchased in 2011 by Chicago-based entrepreneur, Francis Manzo. The city of South Bend will be the site of launch for the rebranded beer as this was the location for Drewrys largest operation. Production is slated for 2013.

== History ==
Drewrys originated in Winnipeg, Manitoba, Canada, where it was known as Drewry's Lake of the Woods Brewery. Edward Lancaster (E.L.) Drewry travelled to Winnipeg in 1875 by canoe via the Red River, commencing his journey from St. Paul, Minnesota. Two years later Drewry relocated his family from St. Paul to Winnipeg near present day Redwood Avenue at Main Street where he purchased the Herchmer and Batkin Brewery which had already ceased production prior to his purchase of the facility. He immediately began expanding the facility, where the production capacity was quickly increased from 4,000 bushels malt per month to 10,000 bushels malt.

Drewry's beer became famous across Western Canada, which greatly aided the economy of Winnipeg and of the entire province of Manitoba. Drewry adhered to a "buy local" mentality which generated a lot of respect from the local community. Drewry served as a city councillor from 1883 to 1884 and as an MLA for North Winnipeg from 1886 to 1889. Drewry is known as the director for several environmental efforts, namely the campaign where he planted Elm trees throughout the city. He was chair of the Winnipeg Public Park Board from 1884 through 1899. Drewry was a notable member of the Winnipeg General Hospital Board from 1900 until his time of death in 1940, at which point he was named honorary president of the board.

Shortly after alcohol prohibition was amended in the United States, E.L Drewry purchased the Sterling Brewers of Evansville, Indiana, in 1936. Drewry's beer was produced at the Sterling brewers, which operated as a subsidiary of the Canadian Drewry's brand. At this time, international alcohol trade was subjected to certain restrictions because of American law. The first case of Drewry's Ale produced from this facility was shipped to President Franklin D. Roosevelt because of his involvement in repealing Prohibition.

At the same time, the decision was made to purchase Muessel Brewing Company in South Bend, because of the obstacles that faced the now multinational brewery. A separate American company was established under the same name of Drewry's which operated as a purely American business. Equipment was upgraded at the facility and production of Muessel beer was ceased entirely. The original facility in Winnipeg was closed in 1940 and sold to the Great Western Brewing Company, originally headquartered in Saskatoon, Saskatchewan, which has since evolved into the American/Canadian Corporation, Molson Coors Brewing Company.

After the death of E.L. Drewry and the termination of operation at the original Canadian location, Drewry's continued to expand. Two more acquisitions were made, such as the purchase of Chicago Brewery, Atlas Brewing Company in 1951 and Piels Brewery of Brooklyn, New York, in 1962. A year later, in 1963 Drewry's joined the Associated Brew Co., based in Detroit, which helped expand the distribution of Drewry's products. Production of Drewry's products eventually peaked at 1.3 million bbls. The also expanded operations with contract brewing, famously brewing Katz Drug Store's beer.

Drewry's continued operations until the company was purchased by Gottlieb Heileman in Aug, 1972. The South Bend location was closed four months later in Nov, 1972, when Heileman closed the doors on the company, displacing 350 workers. The Drewry's brand was relocated back to the original American production location in Evansville, where it was modified into a value-priced beer, packaged in 40oz containers. The dwindling economy at the time was a factor for both the new packaging and the eventual bankruptcy that befell Heileman in the 1980s. Production of the Drewry's brand was halted briefly during 1988 when the Evansville Brewery temporarily closed. When operations resumed, production of the Drewry's brand continued until 1997 until it was sold to Pittsburgh Brewing; however, it was never produced at the facility.

== See also ==
- List of defunct breweries in the United States
- List of breweries in Illinois
- List of breweries in Indiana
