= Champale =

Malt liquor brand

Champale is a brand of malt liquor, brewed with yeasts more commonly used in wine fermentation, to produce a beer resembling sparkling wines in taste.

== History ==
Champale Malt Liquor was first produced in 1939 by the Metropolis Brewing Company at its brewery on Lamberton and Lalor streets in Trenton, New Jersey and later also in Norfolk, Virginia. The companies' names were later changed to Champale, Inc. and the Champale Products Corporation. The two operating breweries were privately owned by the Hertzberg brothers until their sale to publicly held Iroquois Brands, Ltd. in the mid-1970s.

During the early 1970s through the early 1980s the Trenton facility's production and distribution capacity were significantly expanded, allowing for consolidation of all operations into the Trenton plant. Significant capital expenditures were made to expand production and distribution capabilities at the Trenton facility. Extra Dry Champale was the only Champale variety produced until the introduction of Pink Champale in 1977. A third variety, Golden Champale, was introduced in the early 1980s. All three varieties were sold in 7 oz., 12 oz., and 32 oz. bottles, as well as in 12 oz. cans. The Champale brands were sold to beer distributors in 46 states, being particularly popular in urban areas. Champale was a fee plug on some syndicated game shows in the early and mid-1980s.

Iroquois Brands, Ltd. began divesting itself of its subsidiaries in the mid-1980s and sold the Champale formula and brand rights to the G. Heileman Brewing Company in November, 1986, at which time Champale production was moved to the existing Heileman brewing facilities. Iroquois sold the Trenton property and equipment to a group of ex-Champale employees who operated a short-lived beverage contract packaging operation, bottling Snapple, but the facilities were abandoned within two years. The brewing and packaging buildings have subsequently been demolished and the distribution facility resold. The shell of the main office building, a historic structure, remains barely standing on Lamberton Street.

The brand has been passed along a succession of companies, most recently acquired by the G. Heileman Brewing Company in 1986. G. Heileman Brewing Company was subsequently acquired by the Pabst Brewing Company, who currently produce the beer in a limited release across the United States.

== Marketing ==
Print advertisements chiefly depicted African Americans enjoying the beverage, with slogans such as "Live a little on very little". The drink was pitched as a "poor man's champagne". The beer's packaging and label resembled that of wine.

== Flavors ==
Champale is currently produced in three flavors: Golden, Pink, and Extra Dry.

== ChampAle in the UK ==
In the United Kingdom, ChampAle is produced by Mersea Island Vineyard in collaboration with Mersea Island Brewery. ChampAle was launched on 23 March 2016.

Rights to use the name "ChampAle" were secured after a two-year battle with the Champagne Association representing the Champagne Producers of France.
