= Gottlieb Heileman =

German-born American brewery founder (1824-1878)

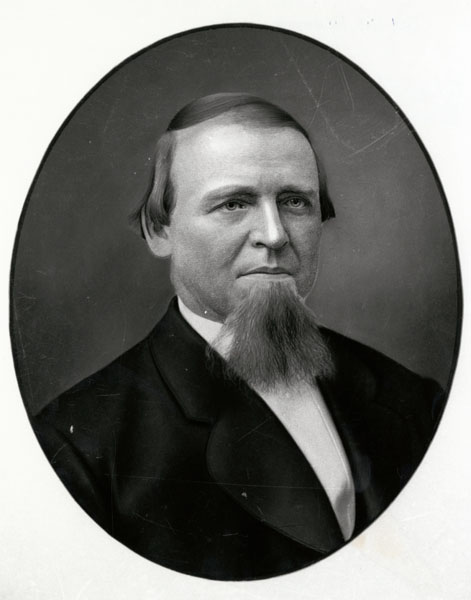
- Born: January 6, 1824; Württemberg, Kingdom of Württemberg
- Died: February 19, 1878 (aged 54); La Crosse, Wisconsin
- Occupation: Brewery Owner
- Known for: Founding the G. Heileman Brewing Company

Johann Gottlieb Heileman (January 6, 1824 in Kirchheim unter Teck, Württemberg – February 19, 1878 in La Crosse, Wisconsin) was the founder of the G. Heileman Brewing Company in La Crosse, Wisconsin. Heileman founded the brewery in 1858. His business strategy focused on producing the best local beer, rather than expanding nationwide like his company's contemporary Anheuser-Busch.

== Background ==
Heileman was born into a family of bakers and brewers in southern Germany, and received training in those occupations during his childhood and early adulthood. In 1852 Heileman immigrated to the United States, staying briefly in Philadelphia before a few year stay in Milwaukee, Wisconsin, where he founded a bakery with another German immigrant. While in Milwaukee he met Johanna Bandel, another Württemberg native, and they moved permanently to La Crosse, Wisconsin, in 1858.

Heileman and Bandel had eight children, seven daughters and one son.

== G. Heileman Brewing Company ==
Heileman met fellow German immigrant John Gund, and they founded the City Brewery in La Crosse, Wisconsin. Early production was modest, and continued with little growth in the 1860s and early 1870s. After a disagreement, Gund sold his share to Heileman, making Heileman the sole owner. He renamed the company G. Heileman Brewing Company. Heileman focused on regional sales, keeping the company small. Following Heileman’s death in 1878, the company passed to Heileman’s widow, Johanna Heileman, who controlled the company until her death in 1917.

== Legacy ==
When Johanna Heileman took over after her husband’s death, it can be argued she was the first female head of a brewery in the United States and following the incorporation of the company, the first female CEO in America. It was under Johanna that the company grew to be an important brewer in Wisconsin and the Midwest. After Johanna’s death, her eldest daughter’s husband took over the company. However, he was the last of the Heileman family to control the company and the brewery soon switched over to professional, not familial, management.

At its peak, Heileman’s G. Heileman Brewing Company was ranked as one of the top three brewers in the United States, prior to its sale to the Australian Bond Corporation and then to the Stroh Brewing Company. The company suffered a slow death throughout the 1990s. Eventually the company was sold to two La Crosse natives and they renamed the brewery the City Brewing Company, hailing back to when Heileman and Gund worked together. The City Brewery continues to brew today, but on a much smaller scale.

== See also ==
- Eberhard Anheuser
- Jacob Best
- Valentin Blatz
- Adolphus Busch
- Adolph Coors
- Frederick Miller
- Frederick Pabst
- Joseph Schlitz
- August Uihlein
