= Pig's Eye Brewing Company =

American beer brewing company

The Pig's Eye Brewing Company was a beer brand and beer brewing company established in 1992 in Saint Paul, Minnesota. They brewed the "Pig's Eye" brand of beers and the "Pit Bull" beer.

== History ==
Pig's Eye was first launched in 1992, and reached volume of 35,000 barrels by 1994 by Minnesota Brewing Company.The folded in June 2002 due to financial troubles.

In December 2002, it was reestablished when two former employees Phil Gagne (the brewmaster)and Jeff Crawford (the vice president of sales) purchased the recipes.

The beer was named after Pierre "Pig's Eye" Parrant, a probably French-Canadian man who became the first resident of Saint Paul and operated a tavern out of Fountain Cave near what is now downtown.

== Types of beer ==
The Pig's Eye Brewing Company brews four beers:

- Pig's Eye Pilsner
- Pig's Eye Lean Light
- Pig's Eye Ice
- Pit Bull

== Awards ==
The Pig's Eye Beers received awards at the Great American Beer Festival, Between The Bluffs Beer Festival, and the World Beer Championships. BeerAdvocate had rated their beers at between C and D on an A-F scale. Pigs Eye Brewing Company shut down during the coronavirus pandemic due to restrictions and financial short comings.
