= Jacob Schmidt Brewing Company =

Brewing company in St. Paul, Minnesota

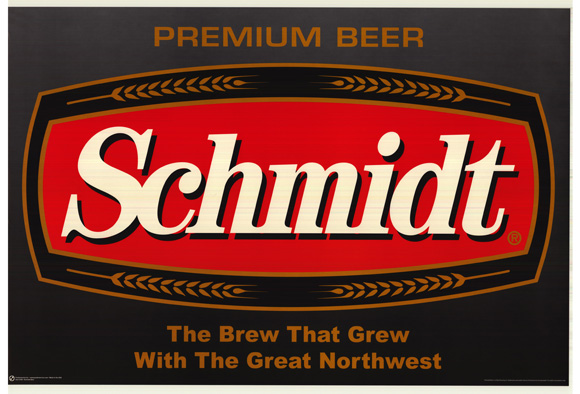
- Industry: Alcoholic beverage
- Predecessor: Christopher Stahlmann, Cave Brewery
- Founded: 1855
- Founder: Jacob Schmidt
- Successor: Minnesota Brewing Company
- Headquarters: St. Paul, Minnesota, USA
- Area served: Midwest
- Key people: Christopher Stahlmann Jacob Schmidt Adolph Bremer Otto Bremer
- Products: Beer City Club Beer Schmidt Beer
- Production output: 1.2 million barrels annually
- Website: http://www.schmidtbeer.com

The Jacob Schmidt Brewing Company was a brewing company that was located at 882 W. Seventh Street in Saint Paul, Minnesota. Founded in 1855, the brewery was originally known as the Christopher Stahlmann Cave Brewery.

== History ==
- Christopher Stahlmann, Cave Brewery (1855–1882)
- Christopher Stahlmann Brewing Co. (1882–1898)
- St. Paul Brewing Co.(1898–1900)
- Jacob Schmidt Brewing Company (1900–1954)
- Pfeiffer Brewing Co. (Jacob Schmidt Brewing Company) (1954–1962)
- Associated Brewing Company (Pfeiffer, Schmidt) (1962–1972)
- G. Heileman Brewing Company (1972–1990)
- Minnesota Brewing Company (1991–2002)
- Gopher State Ethanol (Occupied Parts of Brewery) (2000–2004)
- Schmidt Artist Lofts (from 2013 on)

=== Christopher Stahlmann, Cave Brewery ===
Though Stahlmann's Cave Brewery was not one of the founding breweries in Minnesota or even St. Paul for that matter, it quickly became the largest in the state, producing 1,200 barrels annually by 1860, exporting his lager as far as Tennessee. In 1879, the Stahlmann brewery was capable of producing 25,000 barrels annually and became the first brewery to sell more than 10,000 barrels in Minnesota, along with Stahlmann being one of the first brewers to bottle his own beer.

Stahlmann succumbed to tuberculosis on December 2, 1883, leaving the company to his three sons, all of whom also died within the next decade: Henry Conrad Gottlieb, the eldest (d. May 2, 1887); Bernhard, the middle (d. July 3, 1887); and Christopher Adam John, the youngest (d. December 27, 1893). Without the experience of these well-trained men, the company was not successful. In 1898, the company was restructured as the St. Paul Brewing Co.

=== St. Paul Brewing Co. ===
A short-lived venture lasting less than three years, the company formed with the dissolution of the Christopher Stahlmann Brewing Co. after the deaths of Stahlmann's sons. At the time of Christopher Stahlmann' and his three sons' deaths, the grandchildren were all too young to operate the brewery. By 1898, the job had fallen on Frank Nocolin, the second husband of Henry Stahlmann's widow, Anna.

Frank Nicolin was a wealthy businessman from Jordan, Minnesota, owning much of the town. After the death of his first wife, he met the widow Anna Mitsch Stahlmann, and they married shortly after. At this time, he moved his affairs to St. Paul and took over the Stahlmann Brewing Company, renaming it the St. Paul Brewing Company. Though Nicolin was a man with a head for business, the new company was met with little success. In 1900, the brewery and all its holdings were sold to Jacob Schmidt, who, after suffering a fire at his own North Star brewery, was looking for a suitable site to rebuild.

=== Jacob Schmidt Brewing Company ===
- Schmidt, Jacob, Brewing Company Historic District
- U.S. National Register of Historic Places
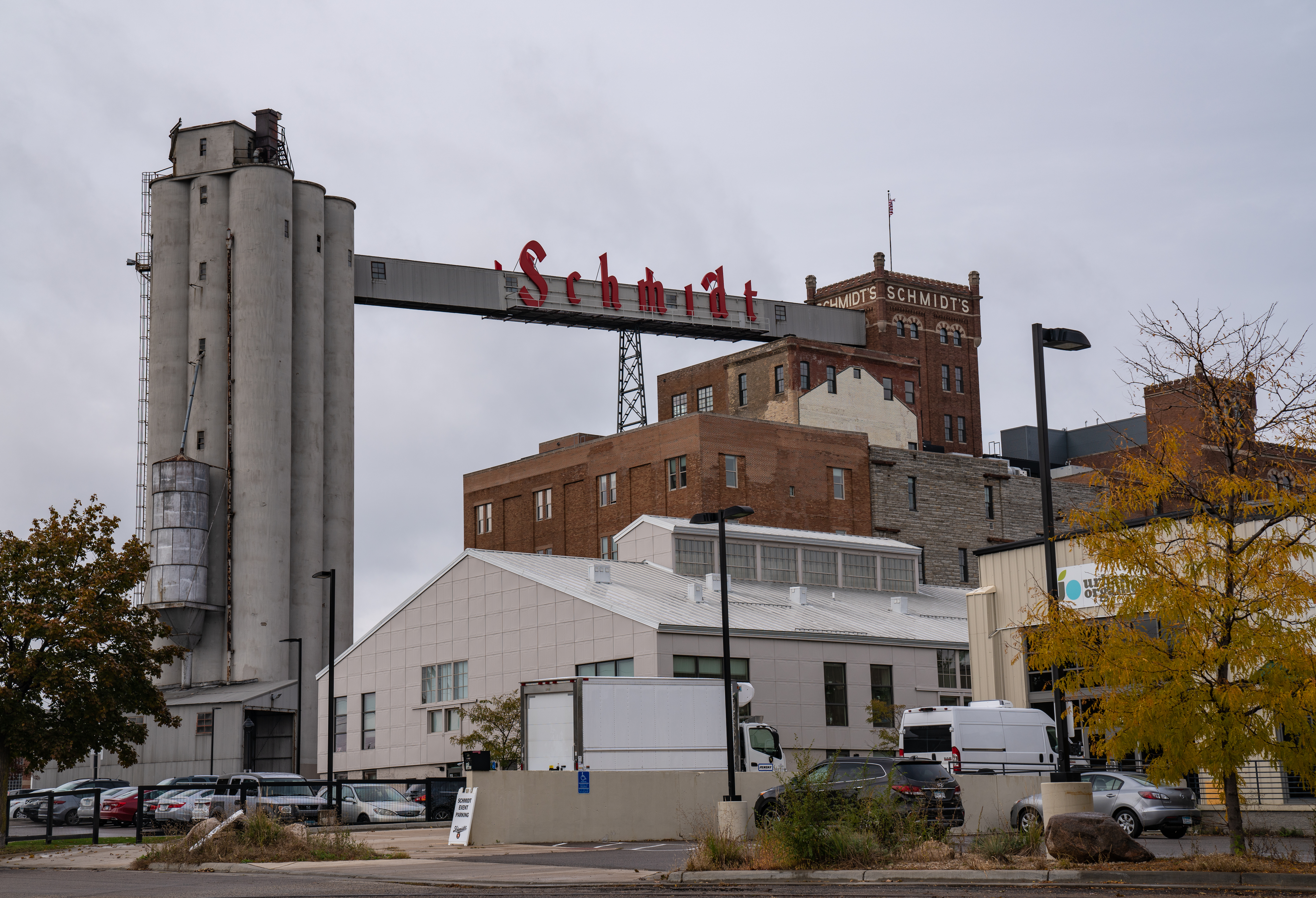
- Schmidt Artist Lofts in Saint Paul, Minnesota. The building was formerly a brewery for Jacob Schmidt Brewing Company (Schmidt's).
- Location: Roughly bounded by line between Lots 17 & 18 of Stinson & Ramsey's subdiv., W Ja, St Paul, Minnesota
- Area: 18.1 acres (7.3 ha)
- NRHP reference No.: 100001974
- Added to NRHP: October 5, 2018

Jacob Schmidt started his brewing career in Minnesota as the brewmaster for Theodore Hamm's Brewing Company. He left this position to become owner of the North Star Brewing Co. The small brewery was successful under Schmidt's new leadership. In 1899, Schmidt transferred partial ownership of his new brewery to a new corporation, headed by his son-in-law Adolph Bremer and Adolph's brother Otto. This corporation later became Bremer Bank.

With the new partnership, the Jacob Schmidt Brewing Company was established. In 1900, the North Star Brewery suffered a fire that closed it for good, so the firm purchased the Stahlmann Brewery from the St. Paul Brewing Co. It constructed a new Romanesque brewery, incorporating parts of Stahlmann's original brewery and further excavating the lagering cellars used in the fermentation process to create Schmidt Lager Beer.

Upon Schmidt's death in 1911, the Bremers took full control of the company and continued to see success and growth. In 1920 National Prohibition came to Minnesota, stopping the production and sale of intoxicating beverages. Schmidt was one of the few breweries to remain open all throughout Prohibition by offering nonalcoholic beverages or near beers, such as Malta and City Club, as well as other beverages. It was rumored that Schmidt continued to produce real beer during Prohibition, using a secret tunnel to transport beer from the brewery on the bluffs to waiting ships on the Mississippi river below. None of these rumors were ever confirmed.

Because Schmidt had continued producing beverages, it was one of a few breweries in Minnesota that was ready to produce real beer when Prohibition was lifted in 1933. Schmidt re-released City Club beer as a strong beer with the new slogan "Tops in any Town". Schmidt saw widespread success and continued to grow. This success brought attention to the Bremer family, leading to the kidnapping of Edward Bremer by the Barker-Karpis gang on January 16, 1934. He was released on February 7 of the same year after a $200,000 ransom.

By 1936, Schmidt had become the seventh largest brewery in the country. It decided to offer City Club in flat-top cans like Hamm's. Schmidt later switched back to cone-top cans. Thanks to a long-standing friendship between the Bremers and Franklin D. Roosevelt, Schmidt was granted a contract from the government to supply beer to the troops.

After Otto Bremer's death in 1951, City Club beer began to be phased out. In 1954, stiff competition convinced the Bremers to leave the brewing industry. The company was sold to Detroit-based brewer Pfeiffer.

=== Pfeiffer Brewing Co. and Associated Brewing Company ===
As City Club beer was removed from the market, Schmidt beer was introduced, its acceptance helped greatly by the introduction of the scenic can series. Between 1947 and 1958, 185 breweries either closed or sold to larger companies. This time was known as "the Great Shakeout". It was during this time that Pfeiffer acquired Schmidt, as well as many other smaller regional breweries. Without a strong national brand to sell, Pfeiffer relied on multiple brands that had strong regional sales. This tactic, along with the need to update the multitudes of smaller breweries the company had purchased, many of which had been poorly maintained, struggled with inefficiency problems and slumping sales since Prohibition, led the company to bankruptcy and dissolution in 1972. At this time, the company and all of its assets were sold to G. Heileman of La Crosse, Wisconsin.

=== G. Heileman Brewing Company ===
As with Pfeiffer; Heileman purchased smaller struggling breweries with regional bases, and again Schmidt's brewery was one of many in a vast beer empire. The brewery, though, ran at near capacity while it served under Heileman and rivaled the La Crosse brewery in efficiency. Along with its own brand, the Brewery brewed Heileman's flagship brand Old Style, as well as Blatz, Grain Belt and Hauenstein.

By 1981, Heileman was the fourth largest brewing company in the country. Still without a nationally recognized brand, it was vulnerable to competition. In 1987, the company was the victim of a hostile takeover by corporate raider Alan Bond. Bond had built his empire on junk bonds and, when they crashed, he lost everything. Heileman became a casualty of the largest financial collapse in Australian history. In 1990 production on the site ceased for the first time since 1855.

=== The Minnesota Brewing Company ===
In 1991, a group of local investors reopened the brewery under the name of the Minnesota Brewing Company. With the reopening of the brewery, a contest was held to name the flagship beer for the brewery. The two names with the most votes were Landmark in first and Pig's Eye in second; the former was a nod to the brewery's iconic status in the West End St. Paul neighborhood, and the latter referred to the man credited with founding St. Paul, Pierre Parrant. It was at this time that the iconic flashing Schmidt's sign that had long spanned the catwalk connecting the grain silos and the breweries tower was removed and replaced with the non-lighting "Landmark" sign. Landmark beer was met with little success and in 1992 the brewery released Pig's Eye Pilsner to much affair. The company started to revitalize the Grain Belt brand and began contract brewing for many small independent companies, including Pete's Wicked Ale, one of the first craft brewers in Minnesota.

The brewery saw some success in the mid- and late 1990s, running the brewery at almost its capacity of 1.2 million barrels per year. The brewery was also able to hire back employees laid off by Heileman's closing of the brewery who still needed work. Trouble found the brewery, however, and a combination of the brewery being too big to distribute just in the immediate area but not large enough to distribute on a national level, outdated and inefficient equipment, and failures of companies that contracted the brewery—leaving behind vats of unsold beer as well as labels for said brands—caused the brewery to shut down for good in 2002.

=== Gopher State Ethanol ===
In 2000, the Gopher State Ethanol Company began production of industrial grade ethanol on the site of the Minnesota Brewing Company. This proved to also be an ill-fated venture, as the noise and smell produced during the production process of ethanol became the target of neighborhood organizations that petitioned to stop production at the plant. In 2004, Gopher State Ethanol closed its doors and again the brewery lay idle.

=== Loft conversion ===
Minnesota based developer Dominium purchased the site of the former brewery and, as of 2012, began renovation of the buildings to be turned into an artist community, with studio space for the artists. As of January 2014, the former "Bottling Department" has been converted into artist lofts and is available for rental.

On the evening of June 21, 2014, as a focal point for the first annual German Fest, held on the grounds of the old Schmidt Brewery, the new Schmidt sign on top of the brewery was relighted for the first time. Several thousand people were in attendance for the event.
