= George Wiedemann =

Brewmaster and Businessman

Bohemian Style Special Beer.

George Wiedemann Sr. (c. 1833–1890) was a German-American brewer.

Wiedemann was born in Eisenach, Germany, in about 1833. He came to the United States as a young man in 1854. first finding work in the brewing industry in New York, Louisville, and Cincinnati. He moved to Newport, Kentucky, in 1870. He was the founder of the George Wiedemann Brewing Company, which became Kentucky's largest brewery. It was located at 601 Columbia Street in Newport, Kentucky. Wiedemann beer was synonymous with Newport. Wiedemann promoted itself as "America's only registered beer" and often used humorous radio commercials as part of its advertising campaigns.

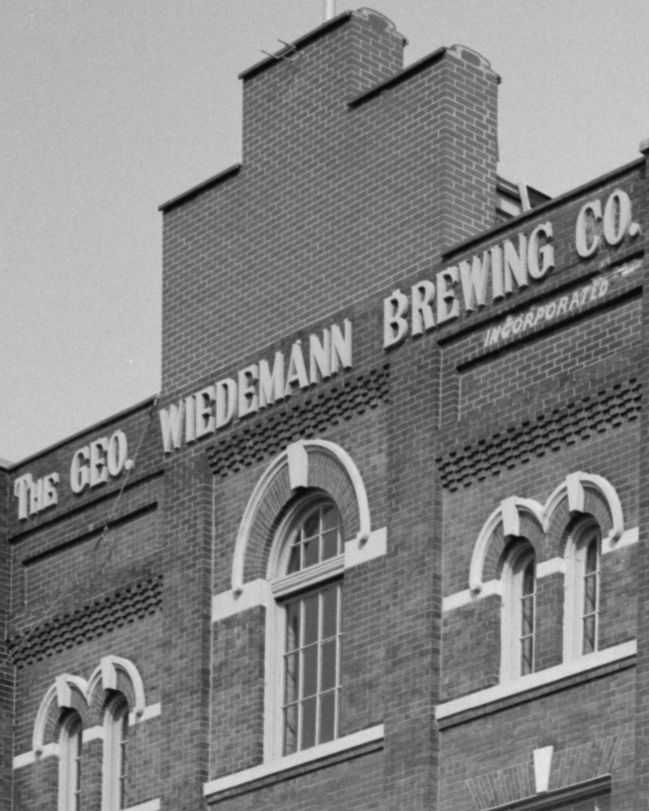
George Wiedemann Brewery Complex, Bottling Shop at Sixth and Columbia Streets, Newport, KY

Wiedemann married Agnes Rohman and they had six children. Newspaper accounts described Wiedemann as an honest man with a natural sociability and a dignified businessman.

On May 25, 1890, George Wiedemann became ill and died at his home at 188 East Third St in Newport. The business was continued to operate by his sons, George Jr. and Charles.

Wiedemann Brewing was merged with G. Heileman Brewing Company in 1967 and was operated as Wiedemann Division, G. Heileman Brewing Company, Inc. The primary brands were Wiedemann Fine Beer, Royal Amber Beer, Blatz Beer/Cream Ale and other assorted Heileman labels. The brewery was closed in 1983.

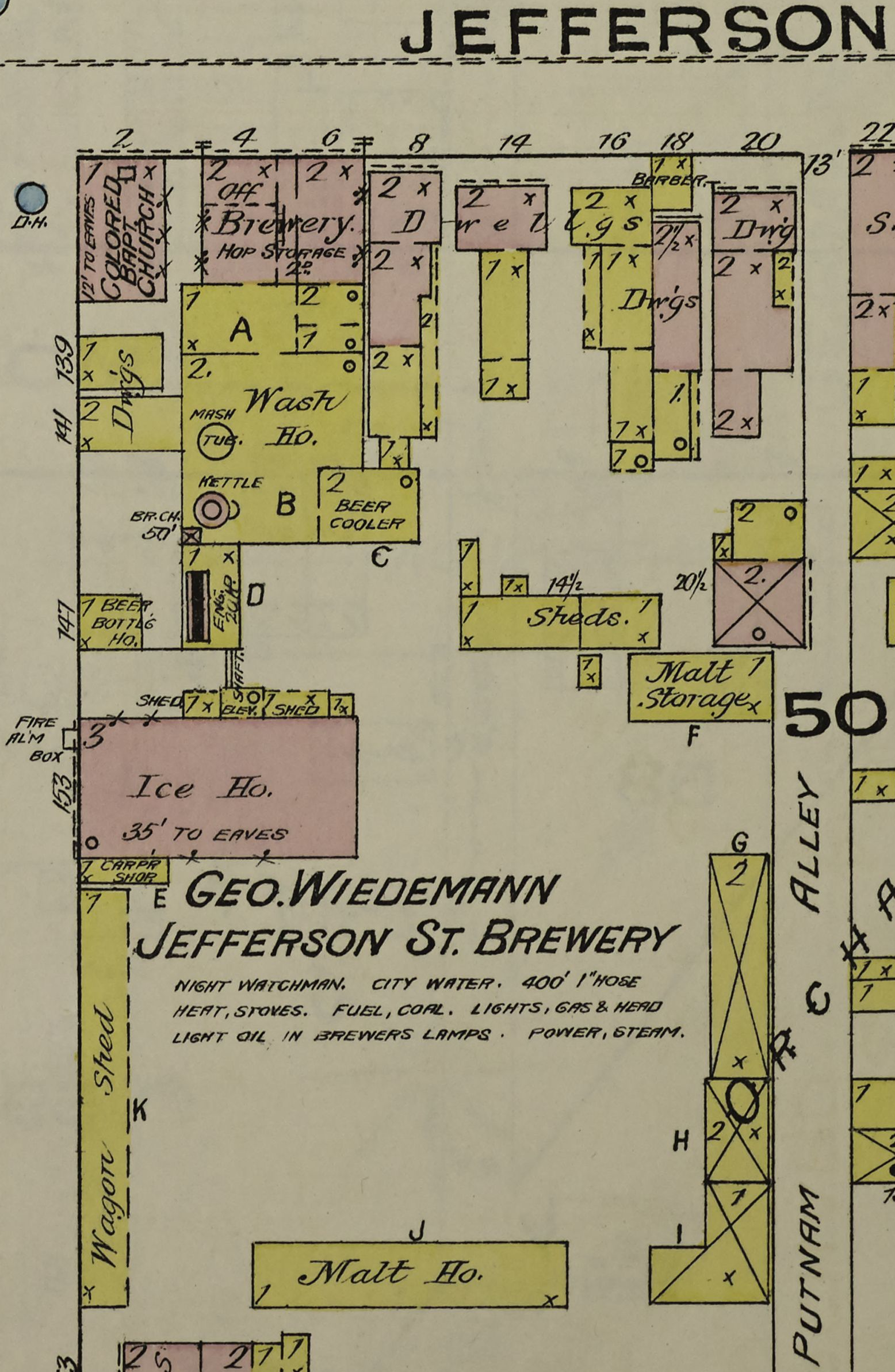
"Colored Baptist Church" and George Wiedemann Brewery in 1886 from Sanborn Fire Insurance Map

The Wiedemann name was then sold and was brewed by the Pittsburgh Brewing Co. in Pittsburgh, Pennsylvania, until 2007 when the brand was dropped.

In 2012, a Newport, Kentucky, company, Geo. Wiedemann Brewing Company, LLC, re-established the brand and started brewing Wiedemann Special Lager as a small-batch, craft beer. The name, the recipe, logo and all intellectual rights were bought out by beer brewer and journalist Jon Newberry. In 2018 Jon and wife, Betsy purchased an old funeral home in Cincinnati and after a few years of renovating the old building it opened up not only a brewery but a taproom and restaurant.

In 2019 the home of George Wiedemann Jr. at 401 Park Avenue was renovated and is now utilized as a place of business.
