= G. Heileman Brewing Company =

American brewing company

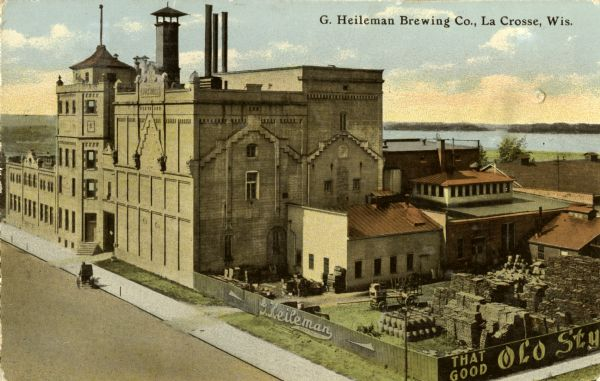
- Industry: Alcoholic Beverage
- Founded: November 13, 1858 as The City Brewery in La Crosse, Wisconsin
- Founders: Gottlieb Heileman and John Gund
- Defunct: 1996 after Stroh's Acquisition
- Fate: Acquired by Stroh Brewing Company; Primary brewery in La Crosse is now owned and operated by the City Brewing Company
- Key people: Gottlieb Heileman, Johanna Heileman, E.T. Mueller, Roy Kumm, and Russell G. Cleary

The G. Heileman Brewing Company of La Crosse, Wisconsin, United States, was a brewer that operated from 1858 to 1996. It was ultimately acquired by Stroh's. From 1872 until its acquisition, the brewery bore the family name of its co-founder and brewer Gottlieb Heileman.

== Background ==
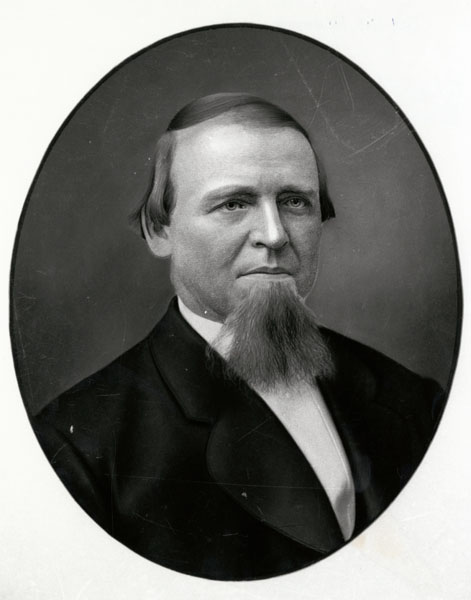
Gottlieb Heileman, one of the co-founders of the City Brewery, eventually the G. Heileman Brewing Company

In 1858, Gottlieb Heileman, an immigrant from Württemberg, joined in a business venture with John Gund, an immigrant from Baden. Together, the pair founded The City Brewery in La Crosse, Wisconsin in 1858. The City Brewery produced beer at a modest rate, sticking to just local and regional production. The beer produced at the City Brewery primarily went to local hotels and bars. Because hotels and bars were their primary target, Heileman and Gund collaborated on the International Hotel, formerly the Augusta Hotel, which the pair bought and rebuilt after a fire in 1862.

In 1872, however, the pair had a falling out due to several factors, foremost among them being Gund's desire to expand the brewery and Heileman's desire to stay local. Following the dissolution of the partnership, Gund bought Heileman's shares of the International Hotel and Heileman bought Gund's shares of the City Brewery. Gund went on to found the Gund Brewing Company whereas Heileman renamed the City Brewery the G. Heileman's City Brewery.

== History ==
=== 1872–1920 ===
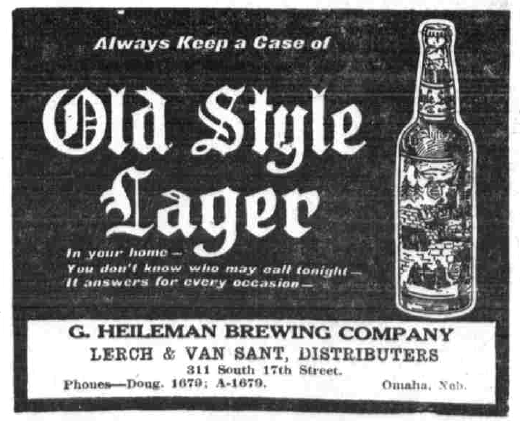
Newspaper for Old Style Lager, from 1911.

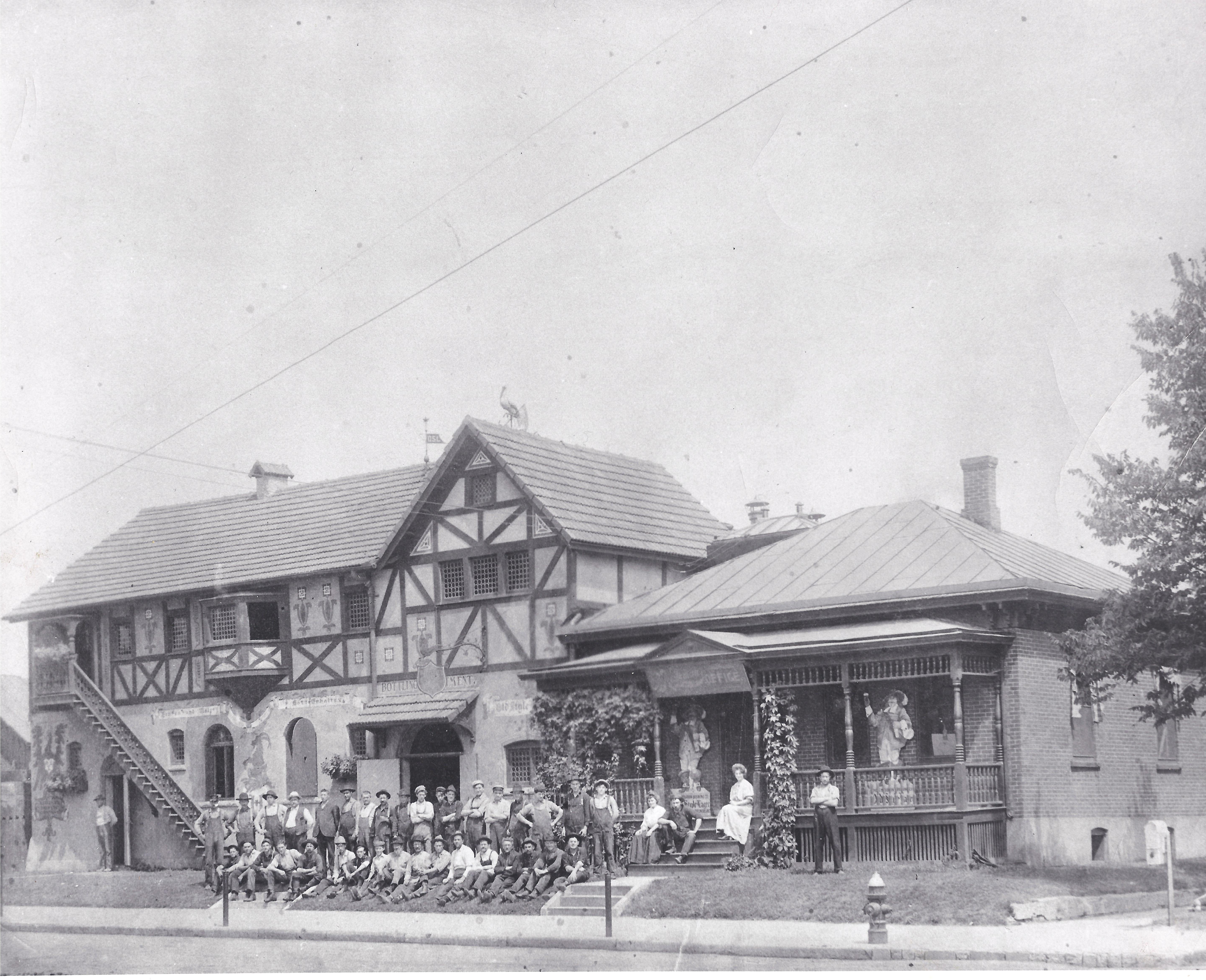
G. Heileman Brew House, circa 1910

The G. Heileman Brewery came to exist after the dissolution of the Gund/Heileman partnership in 1872. Still under Heileman's direction, the company remained a local brewery, producing only 3,000 barrels of beer a year for La Crosse and the surrounding community.

In 1878, Heileman died. Because the company was family held, following Heileman's death, ownership passed on to his widow, Johanna Heileman, who was to control the company until their nine-year-old son, Henry, was ready to take over. With her brother-in-law as foreman in the brewery, the Heileman Brewery started expanding. By 1880 they were producing more than 7,000 barrels of beer. Eventually, Johanna's son-in-law, Emil T. Mueller, joined the family business. The three of them incorporated the company in 1890, calling it the G. Heileman Brewing Company – the name it held until its closing in 1991.

Following the death of Henry Heileman, the heir to the company, in 1895, Mueller became vice president of the company, behind only Johanna, one of the first female CEOs in the history of the United States. It was also around the time of Henry's death that Heileman began developing their historic Old Style Brand. By 1902, the company was producing around 160,000 barrels of Old Style Lager. It was also that year that the company voted in a union, the last brewer in La Crosse to do so, allowing the company to expand even further. By 1915, Heileman had expanded to serving over 30 states. Johanna died in 1917, shortly after reaching 34 distribution states and only three years before Prohibition began in 1920.

=== 1920–1933 ===
Prohibition was signed into law officially on January 17, 1920, making it illegal to produce any beverage with more than half a percent of alcohol. Heileman quickly reorganized, dropping their Old Style Lager in favor of a new product, New Style Lager, which contained less than ½ a percent of alcohol. Heileman also began producing soda beverages and "malt tonics" with very little success – the company only sold 20,000 barrels in 1926. The company finally hit success with their production of barley malt syrup, legally sold as a sweetener but which they made with the intention of consumers using it in private beer-making.

Thus, Heileman barely made it through Prohibition. Gund Brewery, founded after the Heileman/Gund partnership broke up, was unable to stay afloat during this time. A fire in September 1931 almost ran Heileman out of business, causing upwards of $50,000 in damages. The company continued to squeak by until President Franklin D. Roosevelt's Congress modified the meaning of the 18th Amendment by removing beer and light wines from the Federal Government's definition of "alcoholic beverages", after which Heileman resumed all beer-making operations.

=== 1933–1971 ===
Following the end of Prohibition, the Heileman family members sold their shares of the company to Paul Davis Company of Chicago in 1933, who formalized the company as The G. Heileman Brewing Company Incorporated; the new company president signed the first stock certificates of Heileman that same year. Throughout the 1930s, the company continued to expand their facilities to accommodate increased production needs. There was a major upgrade in the mid 1930s following the creation of Special Export, Heileman's second house brew. Whereas Old Style Lager was only around 4% alcohol, Special Export was over 6%.

There was a brief slowing in production during World War II, when the company was impacted by the rationing going on in the country. It was also during WWII that the company took a different approach to brewing and marketing. Heileman began producing several new labels, none of which were as well done as their previous two labels, Old Style Lager and Special Export. Previously, marketing campaigns stressed the quality of their products, but with the influx of labels, Heileman began focusing on the prices and consumer appeal. The focus away from quality led to a sharp decrease in sales by the end of WWII. Not only did marketing change, but a strike at the La Crosse Brewery in 1948 shut down operations for three months.

Roy E. Kumm took over as president in 1957. A long-time employee at Heileman, Kumm remembered Heileman's prior to World War II and wanted to return the company to that position. He developed the strategy that Heileman would follow for the next three decades:

- Expand to new markets
- Increase capacity
- Offer vastly different brands to appeal to a wide range of people.

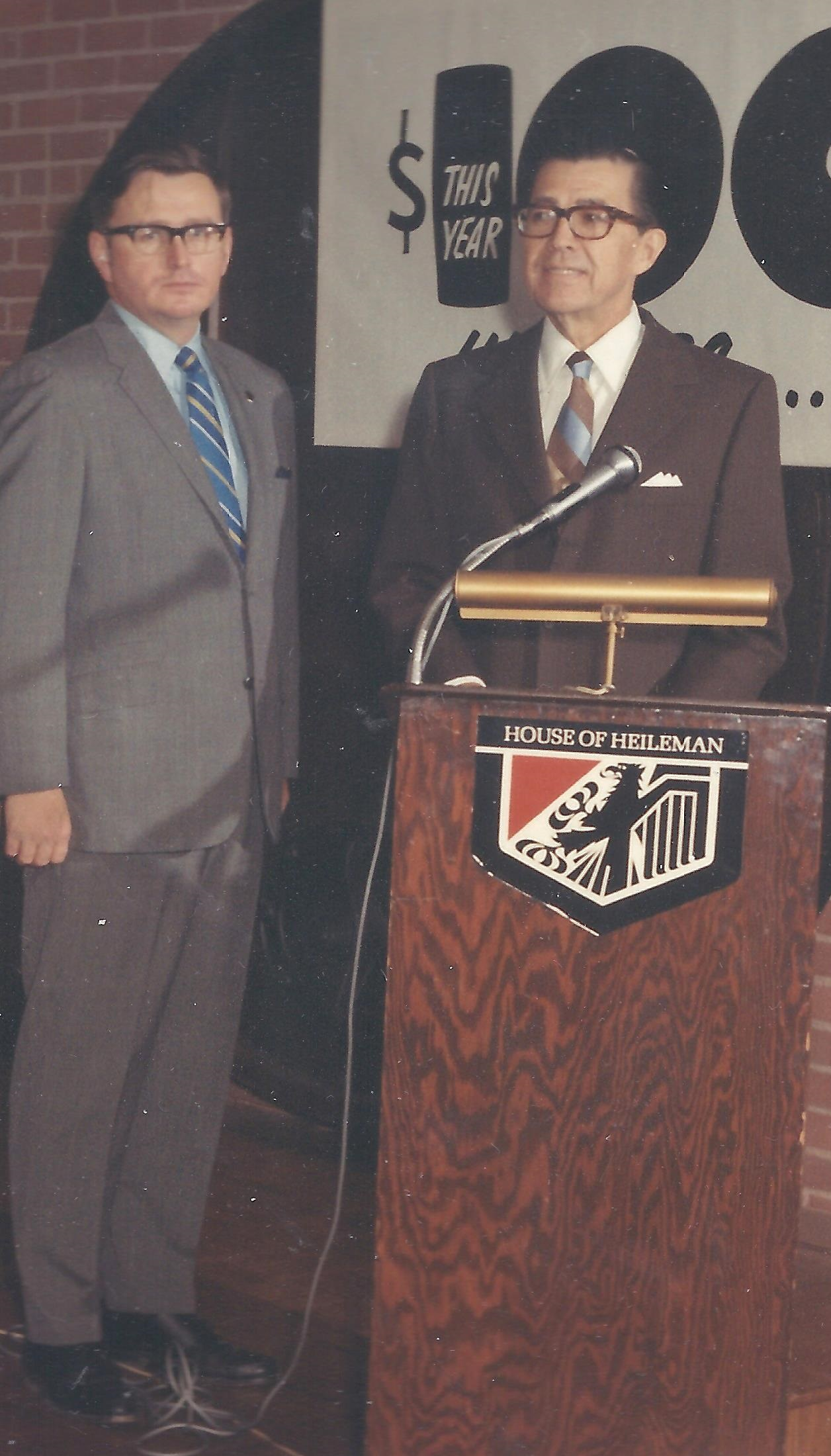
Russell G. Cleary, left, and Roy Kumm, right

While a fire in 1959 caused over $100,000 in damages, and almost derailed Kumm's efforts, the company stayed on track. They continued to expand under Kumm by purchasing new breweries and labels. Kumm also introduced a German-style beer festival modeled on the Oktoberfest in Munich, and beer by that name to the La Crosse region to increase the sales of Heileman beers. The La Crosse, Wisconsin, Oktoberfest USA celebration was trademarked with the federal government that same year. Between the end of WWII and 1971, Heileman had jumped from 39th in the brewing industry to 15th.

=== 1971–1987 ===
In the 1960s, Heilemen hired Russell G. Cleary, Kumm's son-in-law. Following Kumm's death from stomach cancer in 1971, Cleary took over as president. Building on a strategy begun by his predecessors, Cleary accelerated an acquisition and consolidation effort in the 1970s and early 1980s. Through his efforts, Cleary was able to get Heileman stock traded at the New York Stock Exchange on May 23, 1973. During this period, the company owned several breweries in other states. Historic U.S. brewing names that were consolidated into G. Heileman during its final years include Black Label, Blatz, Blitz-Weinhard, Drewry's, Falls City, Grain Belt, Gluek Brewing, National Bohemian, Olympia, Rainier, Christian Schmidt, Jacob Schmidt, and Wiedemann.

Several of the acquisitions were met with legal issues regarding the Sherman Antitrust Act, limiting monopolization of markets, despite a majority of industry analysts calling that many of Heileman's proposed acquisitions would only intensify, not monopolize, the industry. With such hostility towards Heileman when they tried buying other breweries, the company began expanding into different industries such as baking, snack foods, and mineral water, including a Heileman original, La Croix. By 1982 the brewing capacity in La Crosse had been increased to 10 million barrels per year.

The total brewing capabilities of Heileman, combined with acquired facilities, peaked at fourth place in 1983, behind Anheuser-Busch, Miller, and Stroh Brewery Company. The company at the time was making over 17 million barrels per year, with annual sales of $1.3 billion.

After achieving the #4 market share position in 1983, Heileman's sales went unchanged throughout the middle years of the 1980s. Analysts pointed to extremely heavy and competitive marketing pressures during this period. In 1987 Australia-based corporate raider Alan Bond began a hostile leveraged buyout in an attempt to take over the company. Heileman's management repeatedly rebuffed his efforts, but Bond was ultimately successful when Cleary accepted the reality that even with the assistance of the courts (which had intervened to force a higher offer price) he'd only be able to negotiate the "best possible deal for employees, stockholders, and the city of La Crosse".

=== 1987–1996 ===
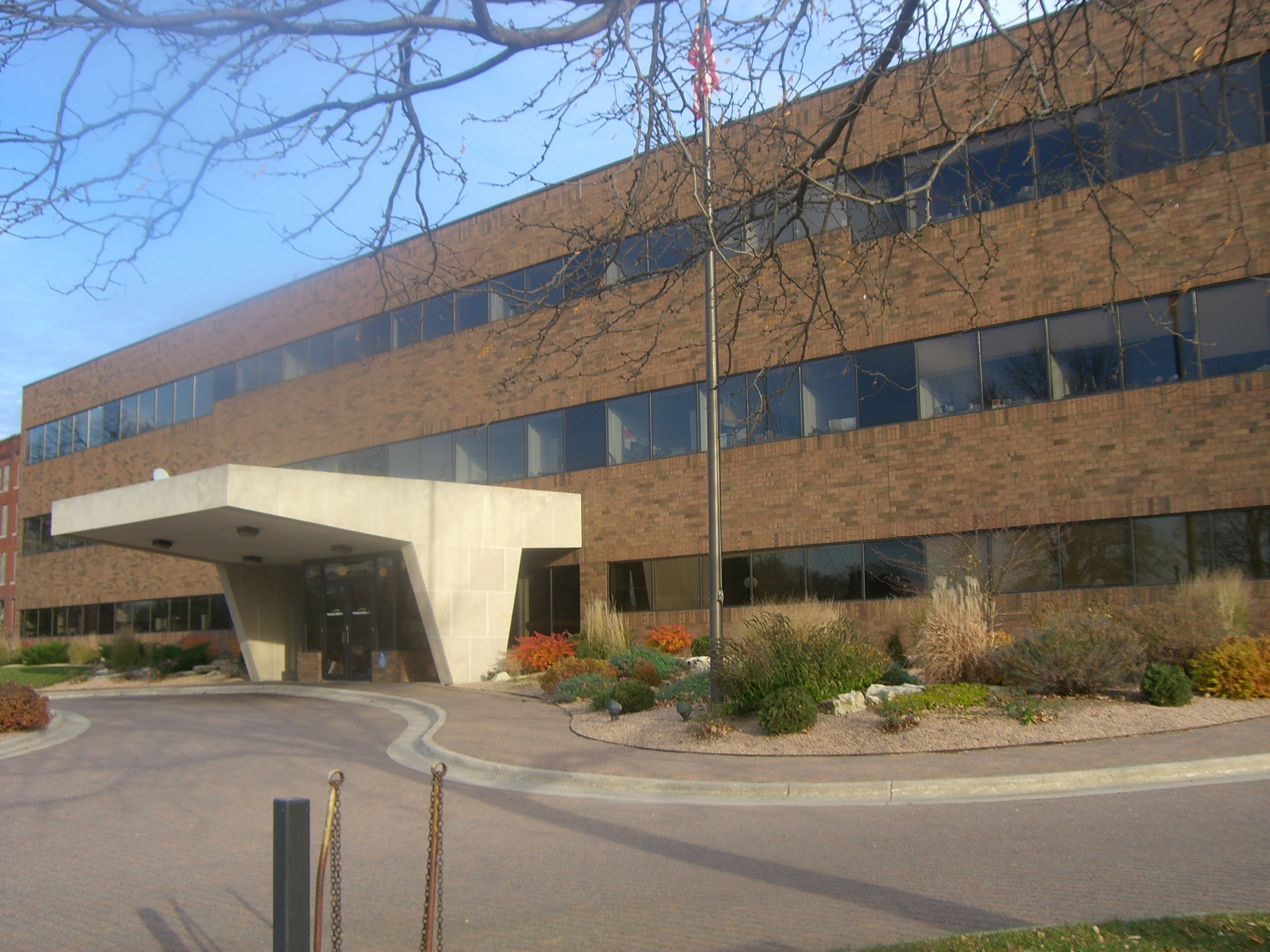
The G. Heileman Corporate Headquarters

Bond, who already controlled the Tooheys name and almost 50% of the brewing industry in Australia, hoped to build a worldwide brewing combine. Lacking cash, he had financed the acquisition of G. Heileman with junk bonds. The collapse of Bond's over-leveraged financial empire led indirectly to the end of Heileman's existence as an independent brewer. Cleary stayed on as director for an additional two years before finally retiring from the company in 1989. As a direct result of the Alan Bond collapse, the G. Heileman Brewing Company declared bankruptcy in January 1991. The troubled firm sought salvation with an aggressive push into the malt liquor market.

In a controversial move, company leadership developed a new brand of malt liquor to be named "Power Master". It was brewed with an ABV of 7.4%, significantly higher than existing malt liquor brands. Protestors cited Heileman's distribution and advertising strategies as evidence that the company was targeting the high-alcohol beverage toward urban African Americans, especially in Chicago, one of Heileman's core markets. Catholic priest Father Michael Pfleger took a leading role in opposing Power Master, helping to organize a threatened boycott of one of Heileman's well established malt liquor brands, Colt 45, which, at the time, had an alcohol percentage of 5.6%. The Colt 45 boycott was called off in July 1991 when the Bureau of Alcohol, Tobacco, Firearms, and Explosives succeeded in persuading Heileman to pull the "Power Master" brand from the market.

Heileman continued to decline. After originally agreeing to a purchase price of $390 million in late 1993, the private equity firm Hicks, Muse bought the company in 1994 for $300 million. Two years later it sold Heileman to Detroit-based competitor Stroh Brewery Company, which assumed its outstanding debt. Overwhelmed by this and additional debt piled up absorbing other breweries, Stroh's failed. It was sold off in 1999, divvied up between Pabst and Miller, and the brand dissolved in 2000. The G. Heileman's brewery names, brands, and intellectual properties, ended up with Pabst, which oversaw the brewing of several well-known Heileman brands, including Old Style and Special Export, under the G. Heileman name.

== Breweries ==
Throughout Kumm and Cleary's tenures as company president and CEO, they went on a campaign of acquisition and consolidations, resulting in Heileman's purchase of 16 breweries through the 1960s, 1970s, and 1980s. Five of those breweries came with the purchase of the Carling Brewery plants and labels. However, the most breweries under the House of Heileman umbrella at any one time was thirteen (for a brief period in 1983).

Brewery	Location	Date in Use by Heileman
G. Heileman Brewing Company	La Crosse, Wisconsin	1858–2003 (Last facility still in use as the City Brewery)
Independent Milwaukee Brewery	Milwaukee, Wisconsin	1962–1964
Kingsbury Brewery	Sheboygan, Wisconsin	1962–1974
Duluth Brewing and Malting Company	Duluth, Minnesota	1963–1966
George Wiedemann Brewery	Newport, Kentucky	1967–1983
Jacob Schmidt Brewing Company	Saint Paul, Minnesota	1972–1990
Sterling Brewers	Evansville, Indiana	1972–1988
Rainier Brewing Company	Seattle, Washington	1977–1999
Frankenmuth Brewery	Frankenmuth, Michigan	1979–1990
Stag Brewery	Belleville, Illinois	1979–1988
National Brewery	Baltimore, Maryland	1979–1980
Carling Brewery	Baltimore, Maryland	1979–1996
Arizona Brewery	Phoenix, Arizona	1979–1990
Duncan Brewery	Auburndale, Florida	1980–1984
Pabst Brewery	Perry, Georgia	1983–1995
Blitz-Weinhard Brewery	Portland, Oregon	1983–1999
Lone Star Brewing Company	San Antonio, Texas	1983–1996
Val Blatz Microbrewery	Milwaukee, Wisconsin	1986–1995 (Currently in use by Leinenkugel Brwg.)

== Brands ==
Heileman introduced numerous beers under its own brand name, for both annual and seasonal consumption. Two of the best known are Old Style in 1902, and Special Export in 1934.

Seeking to capitalize on contemporary trends, Heileman also debuted a sparkling water, La Croix, in 1981.

=== Old Style ===
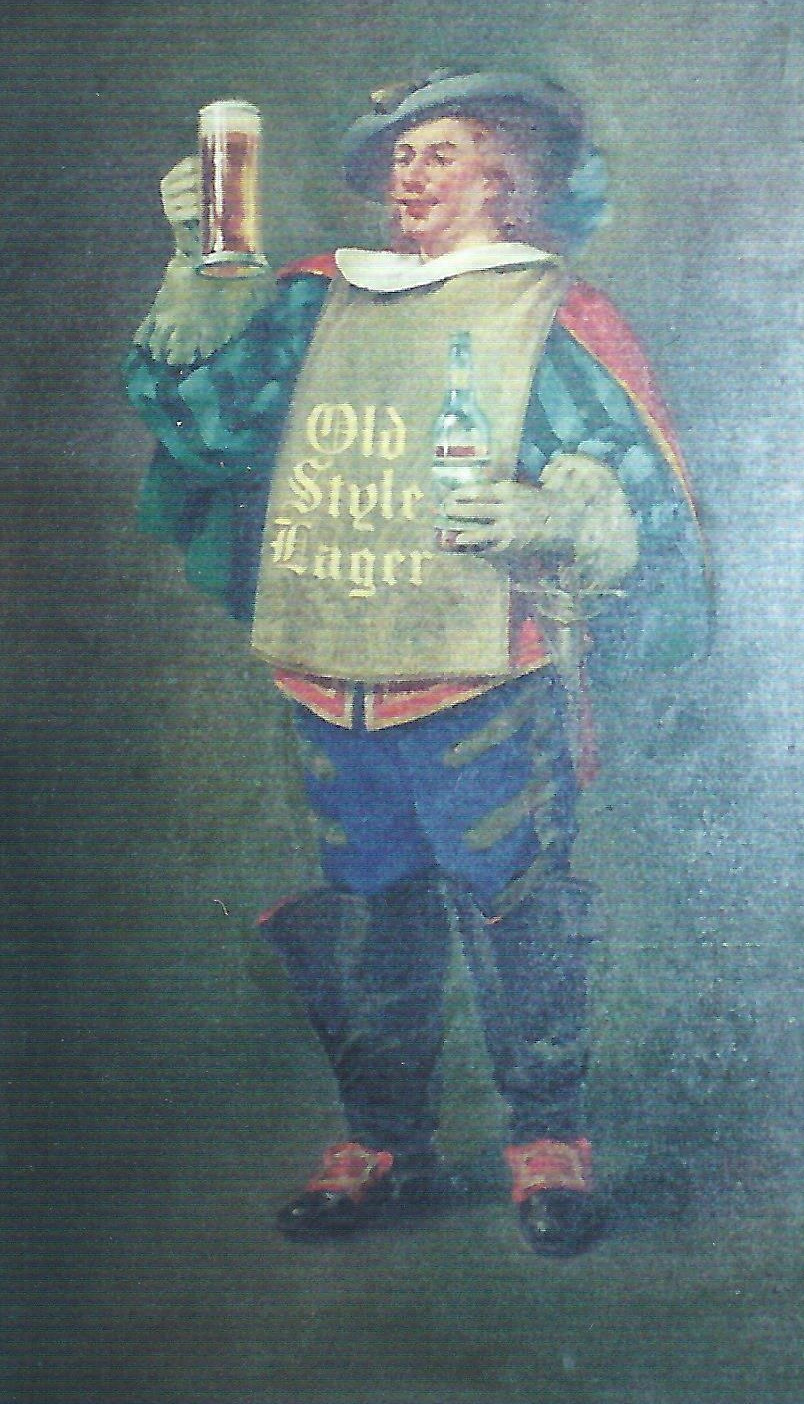
A pre-Prohibition advertisement for Old Style Lager, featuring a grenadier

Old Style was the first brand created by Heileman. Heileman purchased the trademarks for Golden Leaf in 1899, and to complement their lighter beer, the company created The Old Times Lager in 1900. Old Times Lager was changed to Old Style Lager after a lawsuit in 1902, and remained Old Style for the remainder of the brand's life. The company bought the rights to the Old Style label and a Grenadier holding a stein, for their advertisements, in 1905. Despite the trademark of the brand, several competitors created beers with similar sounding names, prompting Heileman to add a red triangle to their advertisements in 1914, indicating that anything without the red triangle was not the genuine Old Style brand.

Heileman had to discontinue Old Style Lager during Prohibition, opting for a new brand, New Style Lager, which they sold as a near-beer (beer that contains less than 0.5% alcohol). New Style, along with the malt syrups Heileman sold, got the company through Prohibition and Old Style Lager returned.

The company continued with the Old Style Lager name for the next decade, changing the name of the brand in 1957 when Kumm became president. Instead of being called Old Style Lager, it was re-branded to be just Old Style. Throughout Kumm and his predecessor's terms as president, the brand was popular throughout Wisconsin, the Chicago metro area, Minnesota, Iowa, Nebraska, Michigan, and North Dakota. The brand was so popular in the Chicago area that it became one of the sponsors for the Chicago Cubs.

Old Style debuted as the #71 beer on the list of top 100 beers by the Cold Cans podcast.

==== Acquisitions ====
Over the course of Heileman's history, and especially during Kumm and Cleary's times at the company, there was quite a bit of brand acquisition, totaling around 400 individual labels, falling under over 50 different brands.

Below is a table of selected brands.

Brand	Company of Origin	Year Acquired by Heileman
Braumeister	Independent Milwaukee Brewery	1962
Wiedemann	George Wiedemann Brewery	1967
Blatz	Blatz Brewing Company	1969
Drewrys	Associated Brewing Company	1972
Schmidt	Jacob Schmidt Brewing Company	1972
Sterling	Sterling Brewers	1972
Rainier	Rainier Brewing Company	1976
Beck's	German Import	1979
Carling Black Label	Carling brewery	1979
Colt 45	Carling brewery	1979
Tuborg	Carling brewery	1979
Henry Weinhard	Blitz-Weinhard Brewery	1982
Lone Star	Lone Star Brewing Company	1982
Champale	Champale Incorporated	1986
Hacker-Pschorr	German Import	1986

== King Gambrinus ==
King Gambrinus is a legendary Germanic king and is regarded today as the Patron Saint and sometimes regarded as the guardian of beer and brewing, making him a prominent figure in the brewing industry. Heileman is one of the many breweries throughout the world that uses King Gambrinus as their mascot. Pabst Brewing Company is another American brewer to do so.

Heileman's history with King Gambrinus goes back to 1939 when the company purchased a 15-foot, 2,000 pound statue of the figure from a failing brewery in New Orleans for $100. It was placed outside the brewery and remains there even today. The company commissioned a second statue of the King in the late 1970s, contracting local artist Elmer Petersen to create an eight-foot bronze. The second statue was finished and installed in front of the G. Heileman Corporate Headquarters in La Crosse, WI in 1980. It was named "King Gambrinus: Patron Saint and Guardian of Beer", and nicknamed "Gammy" by the Heileman employees to avoid confusion with the King Gambrinus statue outside the brewery.

The original statue was vandalized in early 2015, so the City Brewery replaced it with an exact replica in September 2016. "Gammy" was put in storage after some weather related damage, but is in the process of being re-bronzed to make it more durable.

== Today ==
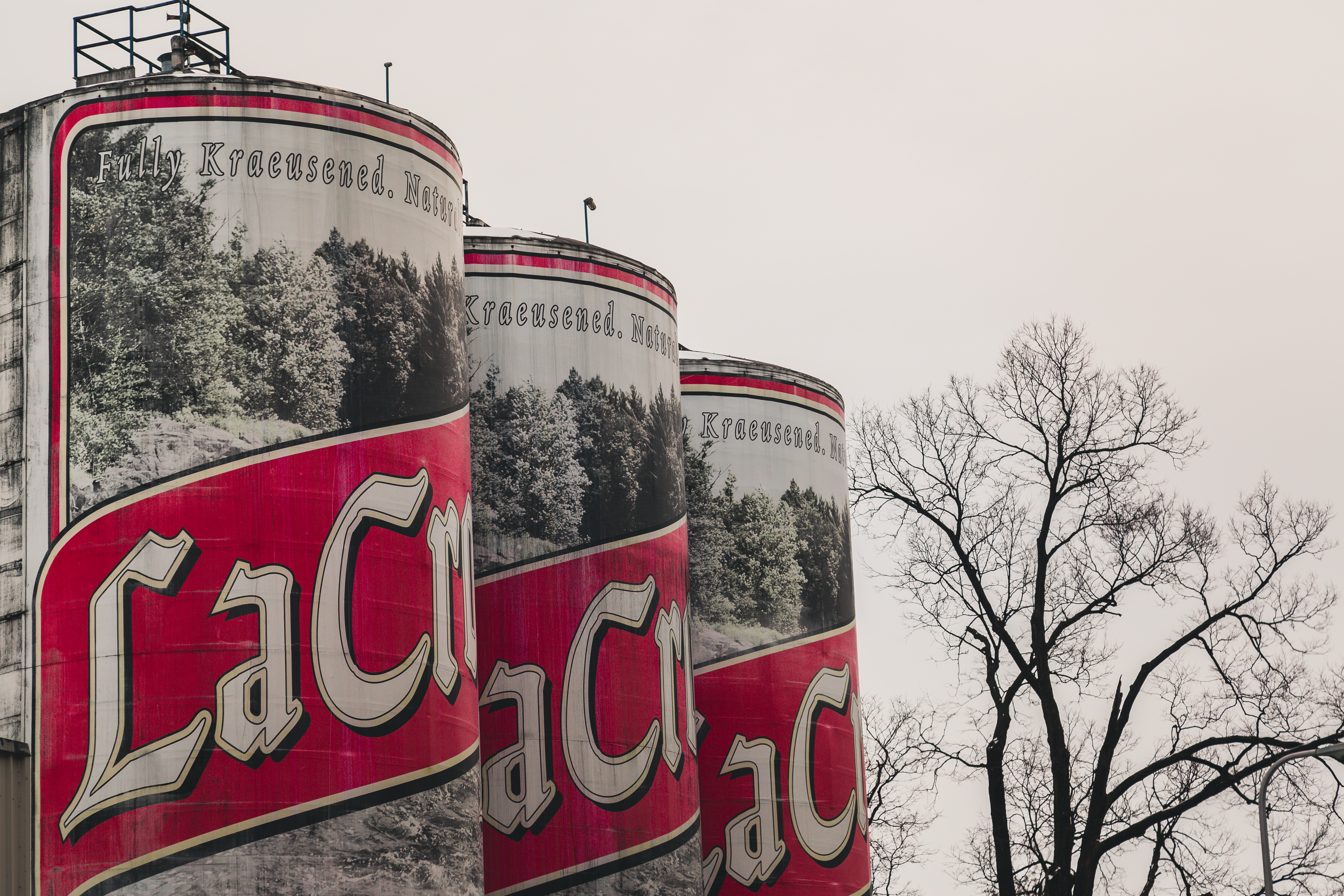
World's Largest Six-Pack, branded as LaCrosse Lager some time under City Brewery ownership

As of 2024 G. Heileman Brewing Company remains defunct. Its flagship brewery in La Crosse is owned and operated by the City Brewing Company, which purchased it from Pabst in 1999. City chose to use Heileman's name from 1858–1872. It does not have ownership rights over the intellectual property, including beer brand names, associated with the G. Heileman Brewing Company. It brews beer, including Old Style under contract, and packages bottled tea, soft drinks, and energy drinks. City's own labels are La Crosse Lager and Kul Light.

=== World's Largest Six Pack ===
In 1969 designer Roy Wilson and the G. Heileman Brewing Company constructed a set of metal tanks adjacent to their La Crosse brewery holding a total of 22,220 barrels of beer. These were used for inventory storage, and were painted to resemble a six-pack of Old Style, referred to by the brewery as the "World's Largest Six-Pack". As of 2021 City Brewing was still using them, with the Old Style paint job replaced by vinyl plastic sheaths printed to resemble City's own La Crosse Lager.

In August of 2023, Pabst announced that the brewing of Old Style would return to the City Brewing factory in November. With the return of the brewing, the World's Largest Six Pack also got an update. The metal tanks were each outfitted with a new vinyl plastic sheath that resembles a modern, retail Old Style aluminum "tall boy" can.

== See also ==
- Beer in Milwaukee
- List of defunct breweries in the United States
