= List of soft drink flavors =

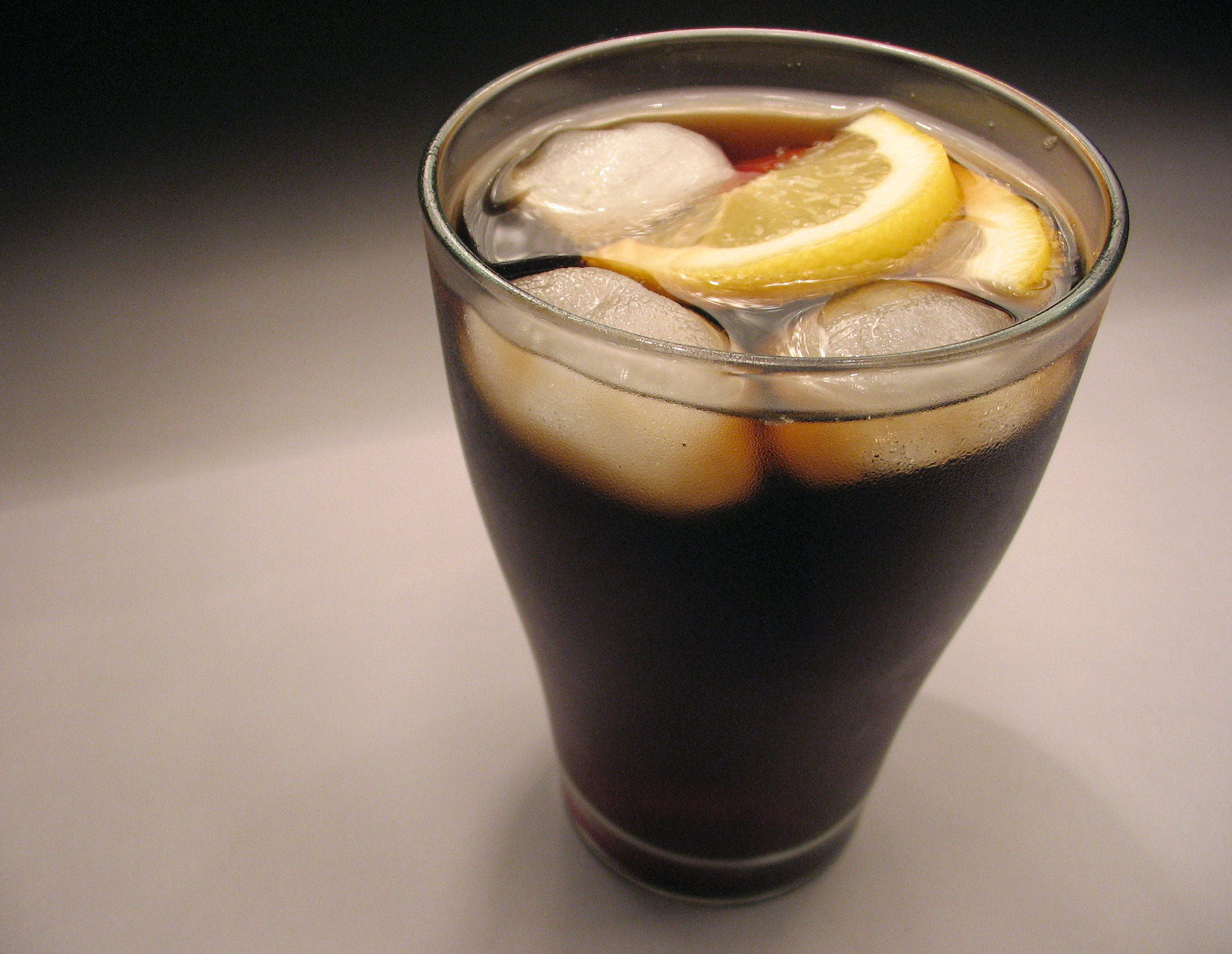
A glass of cola served with ice cubes and lemon

A soft drink is a beverage that typically contains carbonated water, one or more flavourings and sweeteners such as sugar, HFCS, fruit juices, and/or sugar substitutes such as sucralose, acesulfame-K, aspartame and cyclamate. Soft drinks may also contain caffeine, colorings, preservatives and other ingredients.

== Flavors ==
- Almond – common mixed flavor in many drinks, also the primary flavor for brands like Suburban Club sodas such as Almond Smash. Almond-flavored soft drinks are sometimes prepared using orgeat syrup.

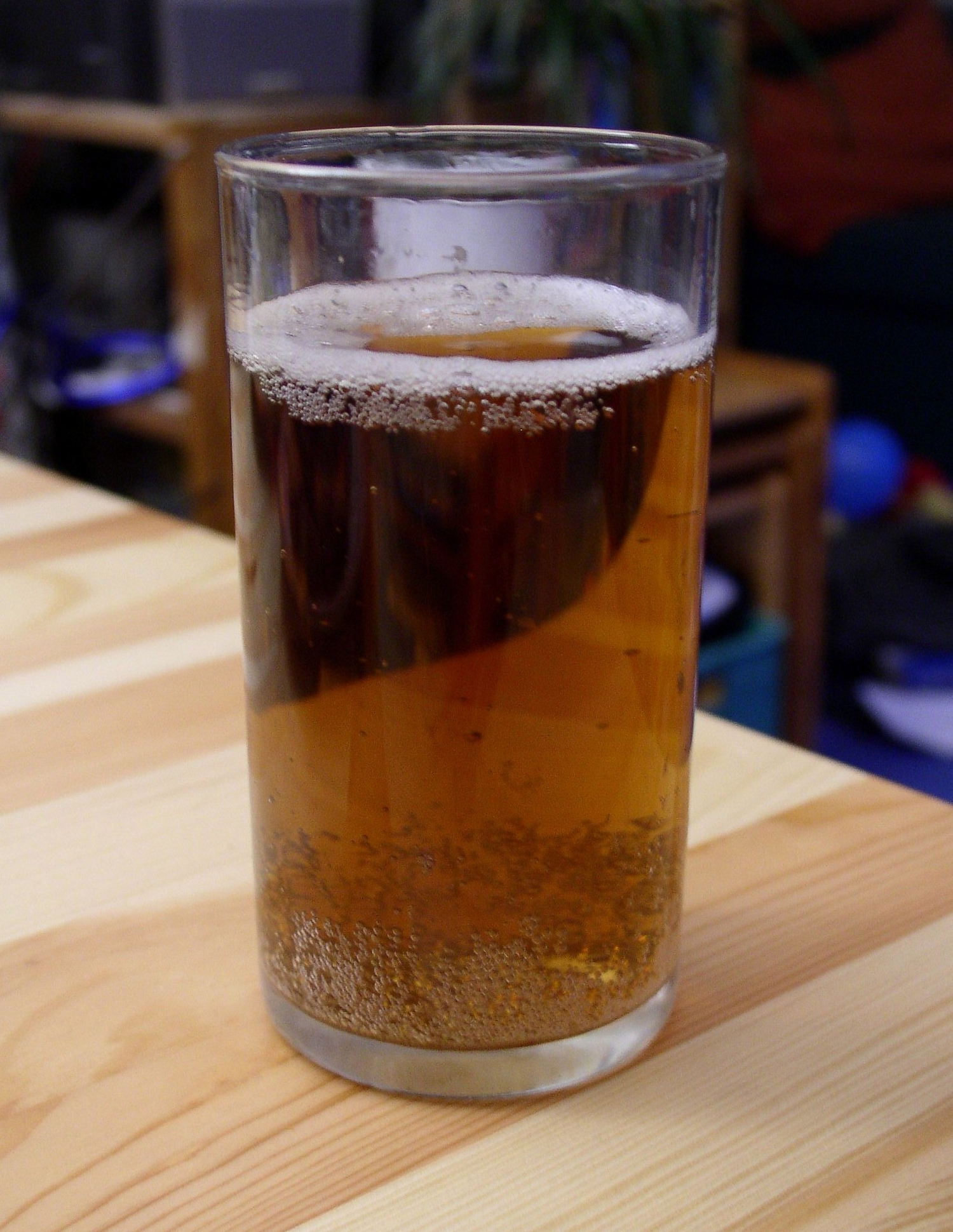
Fassbrause is a style of soda that often has an apple flavor.

- Apple
  - Apfelschorle is a non-alcoholic German drink consisting of apple juice mixed with carbonated water. It can be hand-mixed or purchased ready-made.
  - Fassbrause is a non-alcoholic or alcoholic (depending on the brand) German drink made from fruit and spices and malt extract, traditionally stored in a keg. It often has an apple flavor.
  - Apple Sidra is a non-alcoholic drink from Taiwan. It is not a cider as the name may imply, but a carbonated soda with an apple flavour.
  - Apple beer is a non-alcoholic American variant of fassbrause, produced by The Apple Beer Corporation in Salt Lake City. Aspen Soda was an apple-flavored soda sold across the United States by PepsiCo from 1978 until 1982. In 1984, PepsiCo came out with a replacement apple soda under its new Slice line.
  - Manzanita Sol is an apple-flavored soft-drink produced by PepsiCo, sold primarily in Mexico and other Latin American countries.
- Apricot
- Birch beer
- Blackberry – like those made by Izze
- Butterscotch – brands of butterscotch-flavored soda include O-SO Butterscotch Root Beer produced by Orca Beverage Inc., Dang Butterscotch root beer
- Cashew - brands of soda flavored with the fruit of the cashew tree, not to be confused with the commonly eaten nut of the same tree, include Fanta and São Geraldo, easily confused with the non-carbonated drink Cajuína.
- Celery – Cel-Ray produced by Dr. Brown's of New York City
- Champagne cola – class of sodas, with a color lighter than cola and darker than cream soda, and flavors similar to both
- Cherry cola – brands include Coca-Cola Cherry, Pepsi Wild Cherry, and Cherry RC, among others.
- Cherry soda – brands of cherry-flavored soda include 7 Up, Cherikee Red, IBC Black Cherry, Cheerwine, and Crush, among others.
- Cherryade – soft drinks prepared with cherry juice.
- Chinotto – dark, bittersweet Italian soft drink flavored with a bitter orange varietal.
- Chocolate – for example, Canfield's Diet Chocolate Fudge and Yoo-hoo
- Citron – an example is Cedrata Tassoni, an Italian, citron-flavored soft drink brand
- Clementine – made by Izze
- Cola – originally contained caffeine from the kola nut and cocaine from coca leaves, and was flavored with vanilla and other ingredients. Most colas use other flavoring (and caffeinating) ingredients with a similar taste and no longer contain cocaine. It became popular worldwide after pharmacist John Pemberton invented Coca-Cola in 1886.
- Cranberry – used as flavoring, for example, Sprite Winter Spiced Cranberry and Canada Dry Cranberry Ginger Ale
- Cream soda – often flavored with vanilla, such as Big Red
- Cucumber soda – type of soda made by various manufacturers including Mr. Q. Cumber. Pepsi offers an ice cucumber flavor in some markets.
- Dandelion and burdock – popular favorite within the UK since the Middle Ages. Popular brands include Ben Shaws owned by Cotts of Canada
- Gentiana – such as Moxie

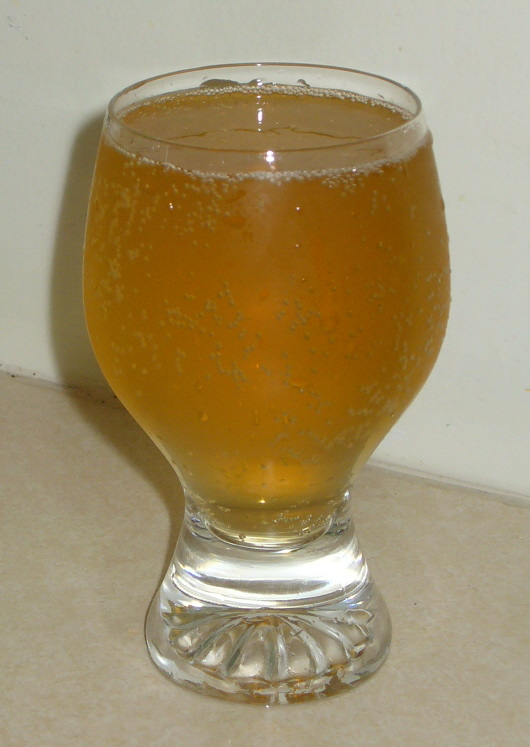
A glass of ginger ale

- Ginger ale – carbonated soft drink flavored with ginger in one of two ways. The golden style is closer to the ginger beer original, and is credited to the American doctor Thomas Cantrell. The dry style (also called the pale style) is a paler drink with a much milder ginger-flavor to it, and was created by Canadian John McLaughlin.
- Ginger beer – produced in two versions: brewed ginger beer (which includes home-brewed) or a carbonated drink flavored primarily with ginger and sweetened with sugar or artificial sweeteners.
- Grape soda – grape-flavored soft drinks and sodas
- Grapefruit – brands of grapefruit-flavored soda include Fresca, Ting, Pelmosoda and Squirt, among others.
- Guarana – carbonated soft drinks with guarana are produced and marketed in Latin American countries.
- Guava – such as Jarritos brand
- Hops - used in Hop water.
- Hibiscus/Roselle - A floral flavor based on the roselles, often sold under the name of hibiscus.
- Irn-Bru – citrus-based soft drink popular in Scotland
- Kvass – a fermented cereal-based low-alcoholic beverage of cloudy appearance and sweet-sour taste.
- Lavender
- Lemon – liquid derived from the outer skin of lemons may be used to flavor soft drinks, other beverages and foods. Brands of lemon-flavored soda include R. White's, Coca-Cola with Lemon, Gini and Solo, among others. Lemonade in the United Kingdom and other Commonwealth countries, or limonada in Mexico, may refer to carbonated lemon-flavored soda as well as the non-carbonated version.
- Lemon-lime – common carbonated soft drink flavor, consisting of lemon and lime flavoring, such as 7 Up, Sprite, Sierra Mist, and Starry. Ramune is a Japanese soft drink, which takes its name from a transliteration of the English word lemonade, which in certain English-speaking countries is used to refer to lemon-lime soft drinks, though the Ramune brand has expanded beyond the lemon-lime flavor.
- Lemon verbena (hierba luisa) – such as Inca Kola

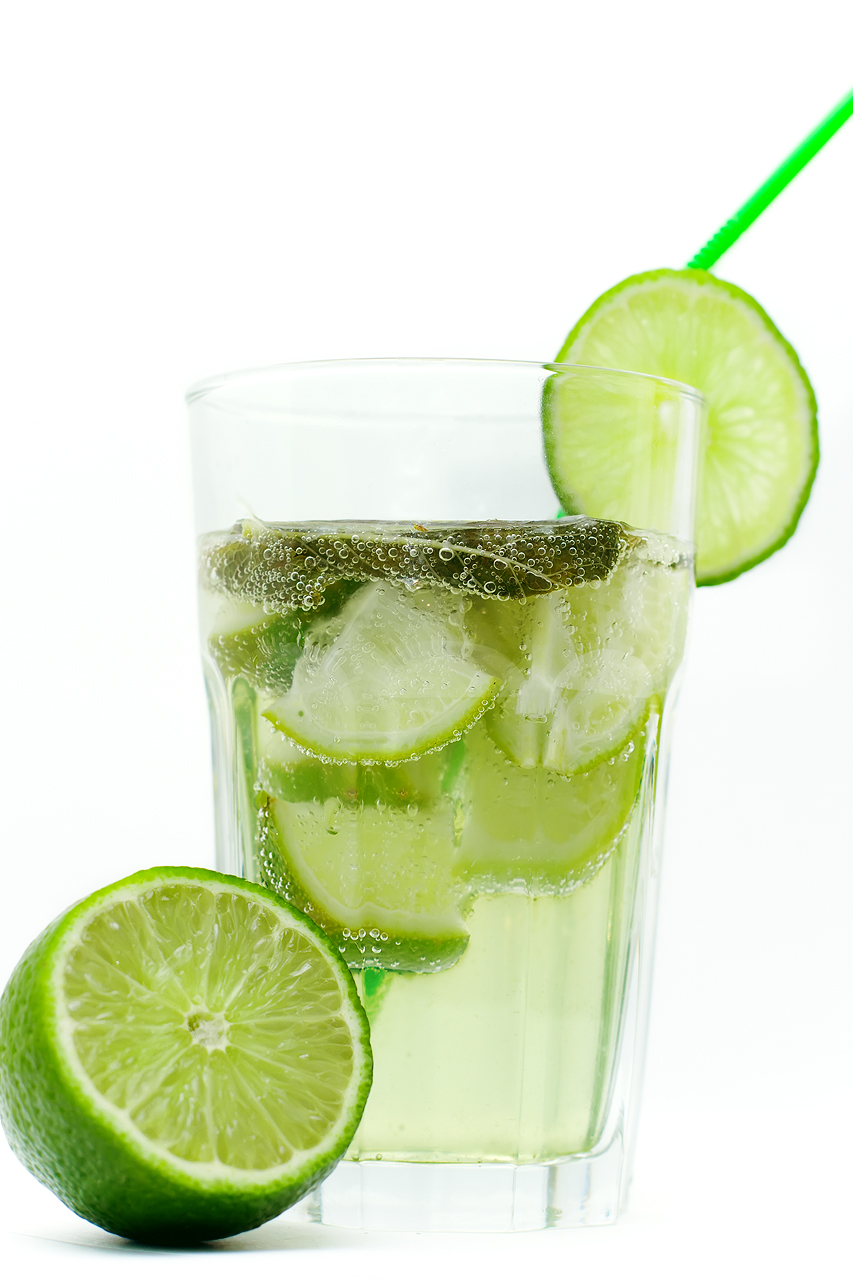
A glass of limeade

- Lime – such as limeade
- Litchi

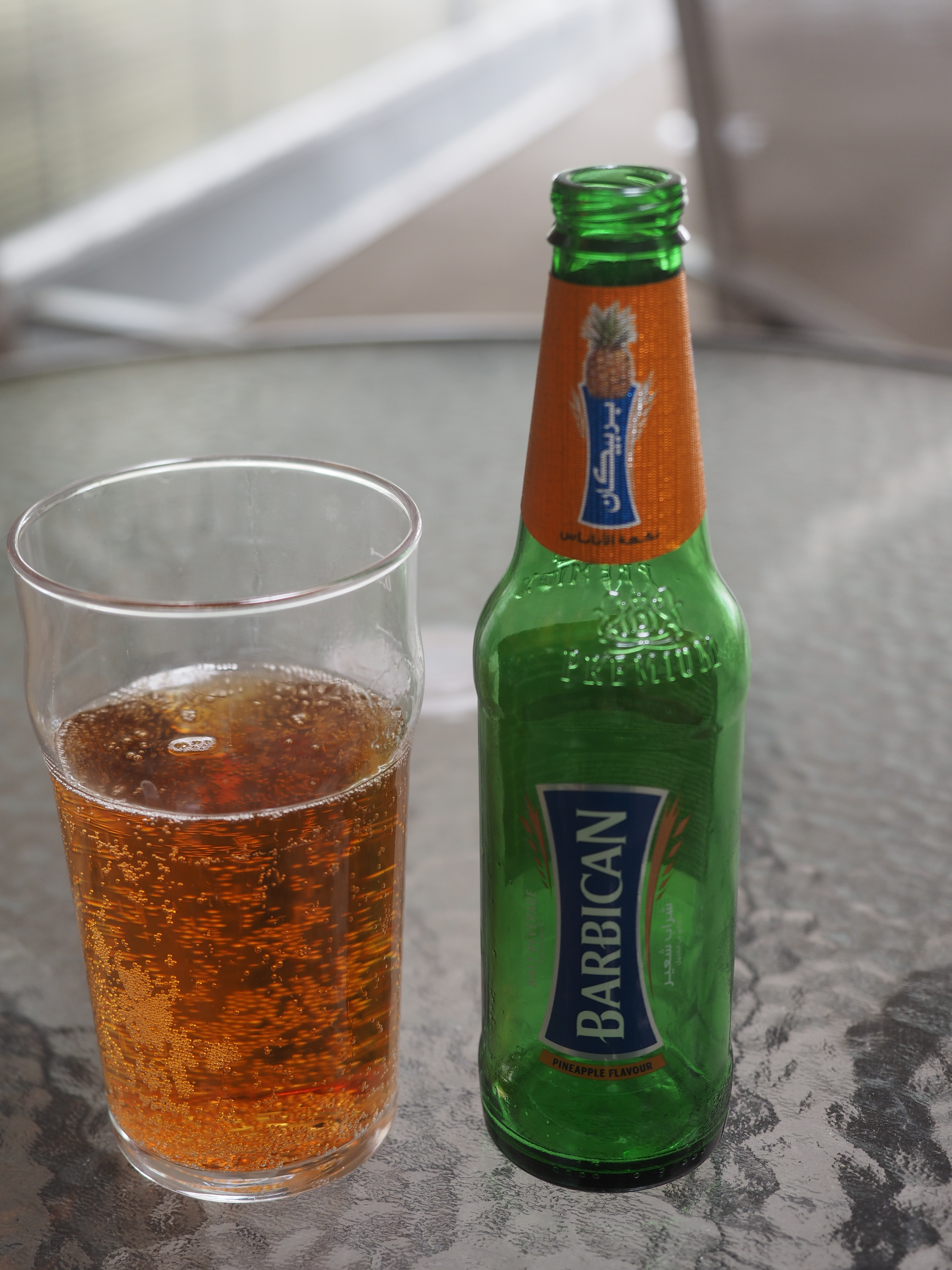
Barbican is a malt-based soft drink from Saudi Arabia.

- Magnolia berry - such as Hwachae
- Malt – such as Malta, which is a brewed, carbonated malt beverage that is not fermented, and hence non-alcoholic
- Mandarin orange – examples include sodas produced by Maine Root Handcrafted Beverages, Slice and Goya
- Mango – such as Jarritos brand
- Mate – such as Club-Mate, a caffeinated soda made with Yerba Mate extract, based on mate, an infusion of Yerba mate.

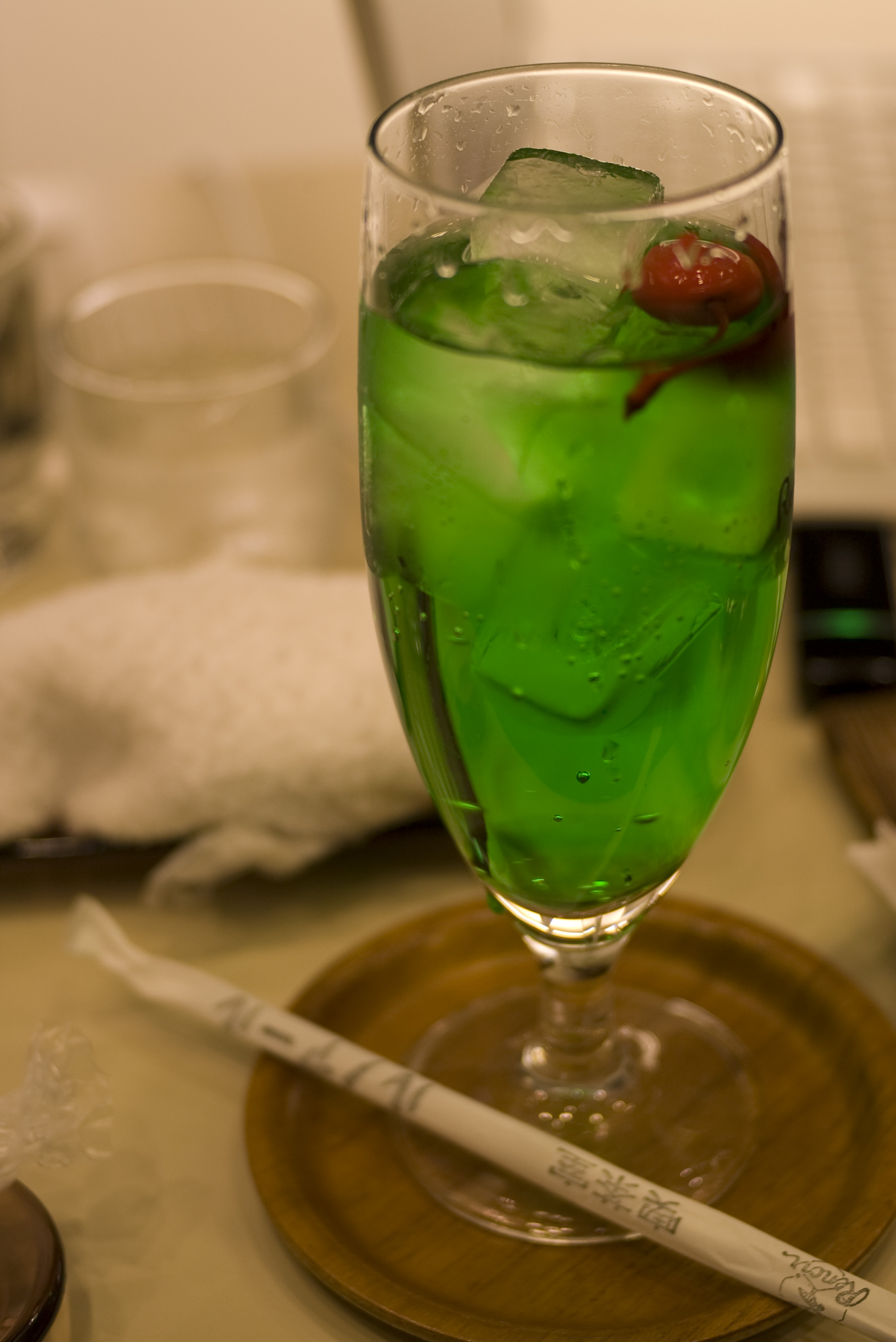
Melon soda

- Melon – Mello Yello produced a melon soda called Mello Yello Melon. It was discontinued. It is a popular flavor in Japan.
- Mulberry
- Nectarine – made by Izze

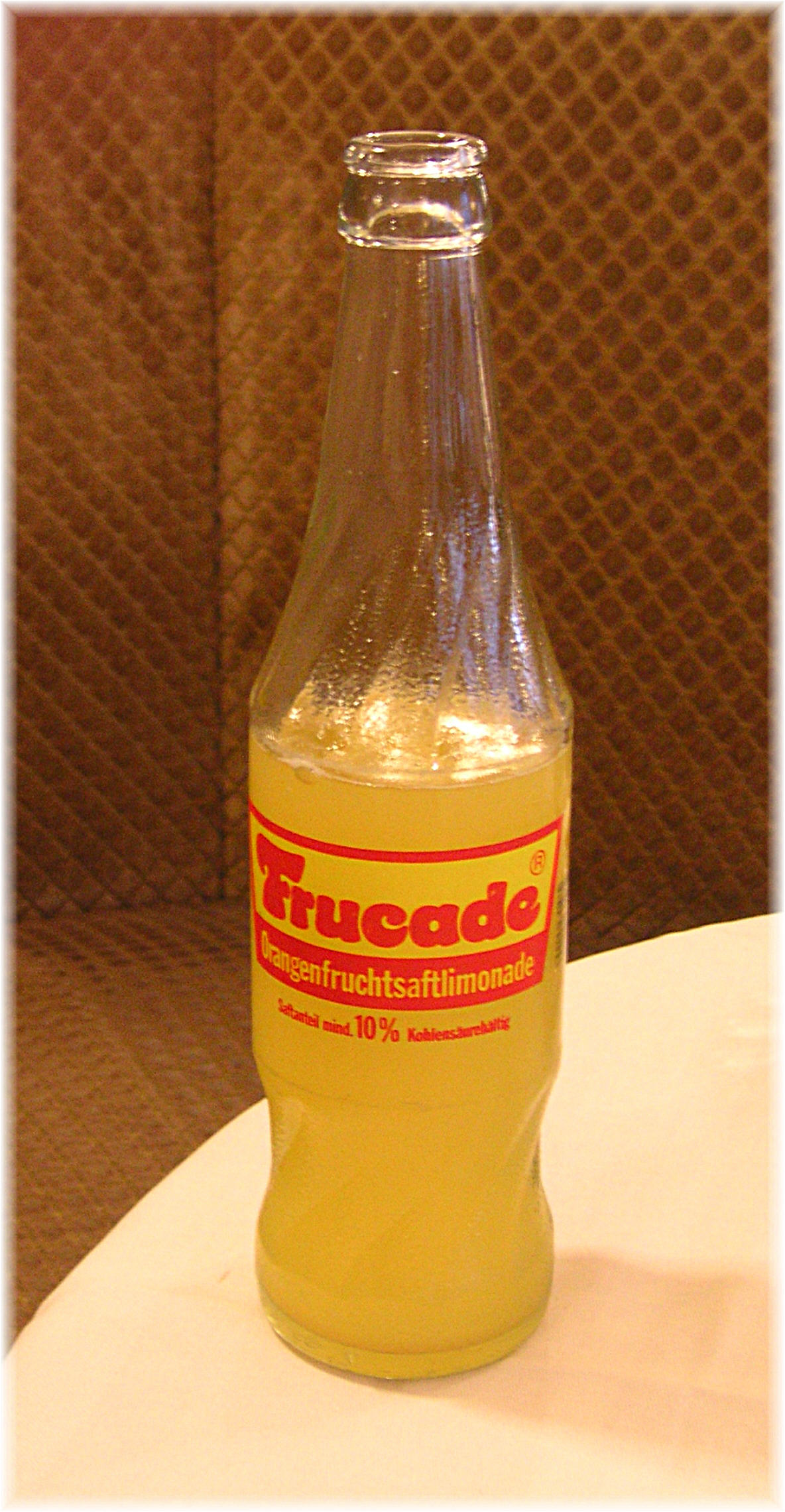
A bottle of Frucade, a carbonated orange drink

- Orange soft drink – sometimes referred to as orangeade
- Papaya – such as the discontinued product by Izze
- Passionfruit – such as Passiona, sold only in Australia. There was also a brand of Fanta produced in Brazil with the flavor, selected by the customers in a contest.
- Peach – such as Big Peach or Nehi Peach
- Pear – such as the previous product by Izze
- "Pepper" flavor, a proprietary mix of Dr. Pepper, with the original Mr. Pibb positioned as a competitor in this flavor category

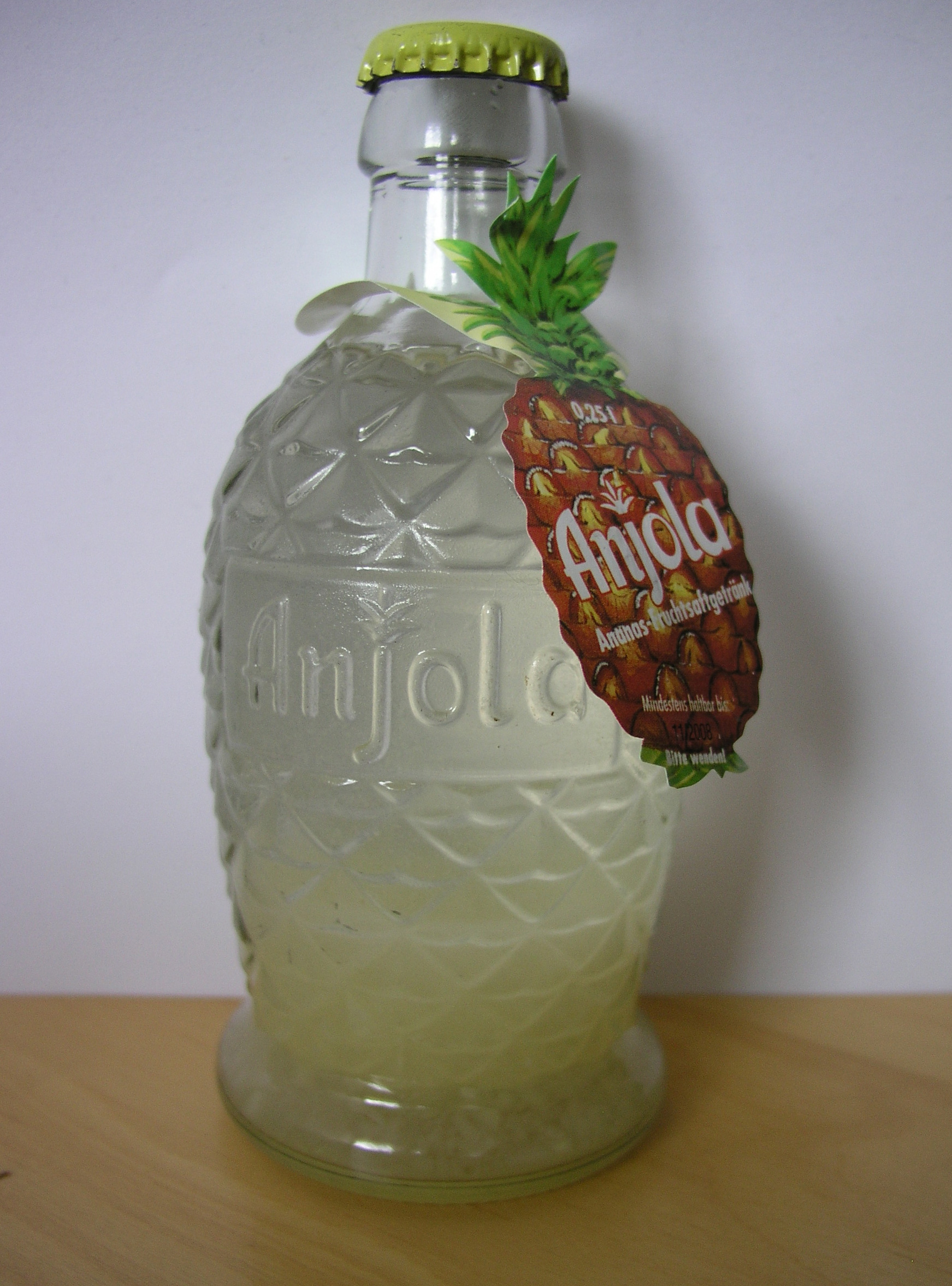
Anjola is a brand of pineapple-flavored soda.

- Pineapple – brands of pineapple-flavored soda include Fanta, Sun Crest, The Pop Shoppe and Jarritos, among others.
- Pomegranate – such as Hansen's

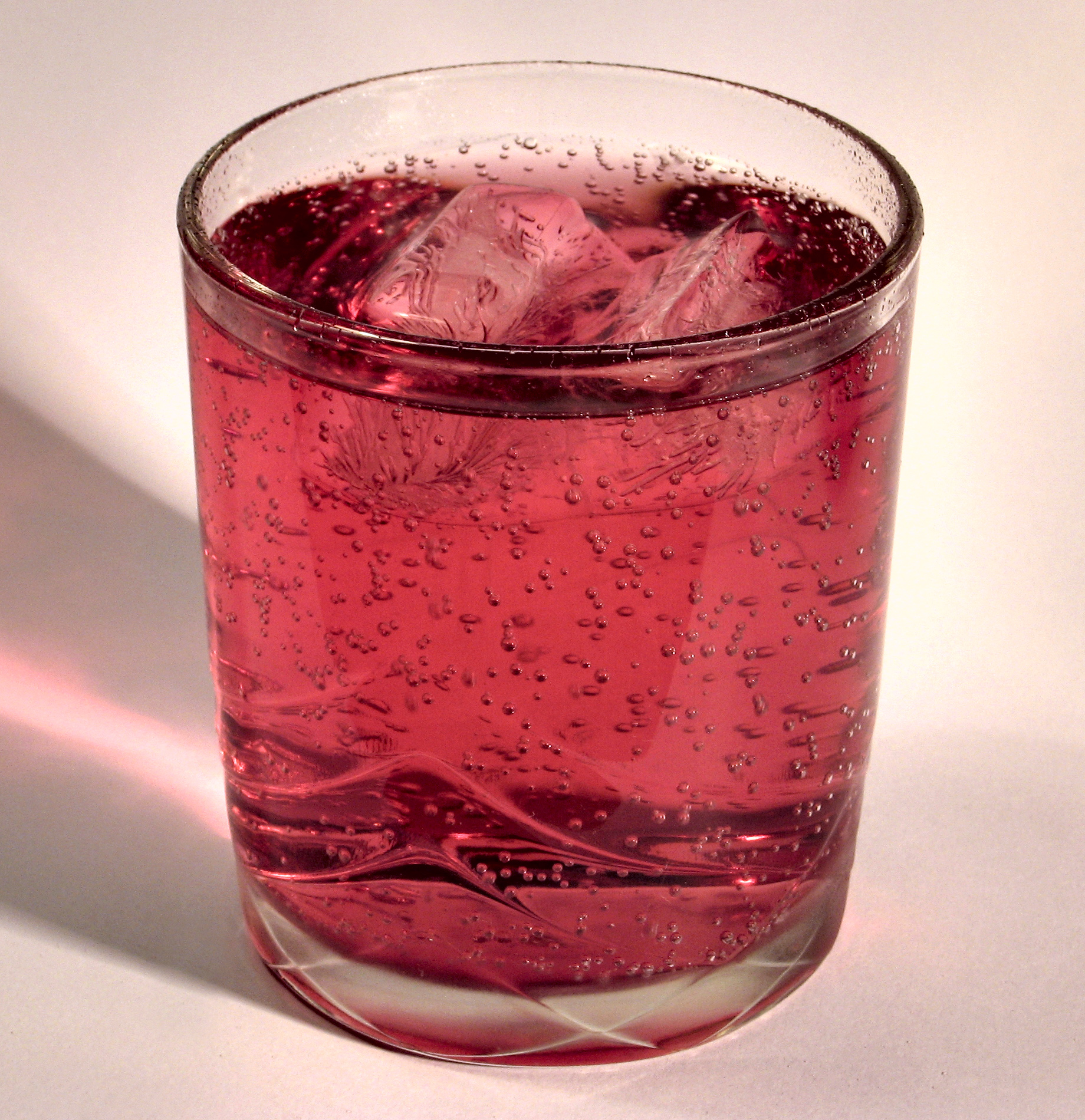
A glass of Raspberryade (as named and marketed by A.G. Barr in the U.K.)

- Raspberry – may be referred to as raspberryade in the United Kingdom. Similar soft drinks are also known as raspberry soda in other parts of the world.
- Rhubarb — typically house-made, a strawberry-rhubarb variant produced by soda brand Culture Pop.
- Root beer – originally made using the root of the sassafras plant (or the bark of a sassafras tree) as the primary flavor.
- Elder or elderberry – used in soft drinks such as socată
- Salak is usually used in sodas in Thailand, commonly mistaken for Strawberry

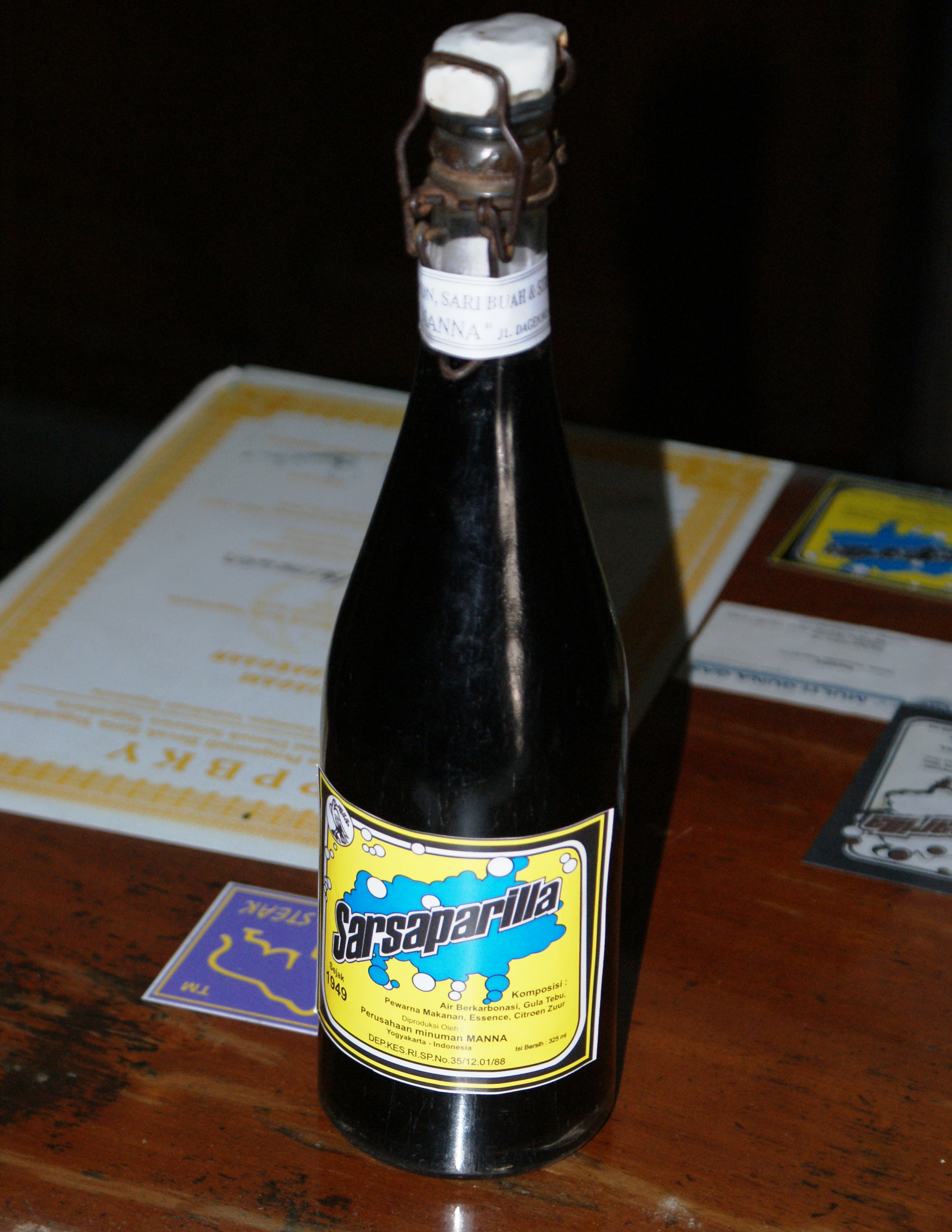
Indonesian Sarsaparilla

- Sarsaparilla – originally made from the Smilax regelii plant, sodas with this flavor are sometimes made with artificial flavors.
- Shirley Temple
- Spruce beer is a beverage flavored with the buds, needles, or essence of spruce trees. In the Canadian provinces of Newfoundland and Quebec, it is known in French as bière d'épinette. Spruce beer may refer to either an artificially flavored non-alcoholic carbonated soft drink, or to genuine spruce beer.

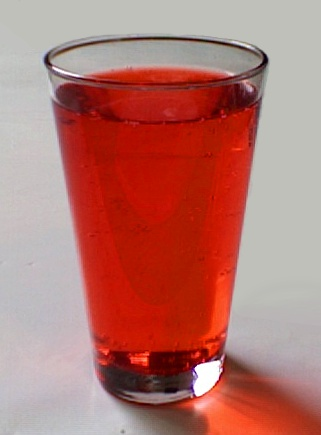
Strawberry soda

- Strawberry – brands of strawberry-flavored soda include Catawissa Bottling Company, Stewart's Fountain Classics, Goody Strawberry and Vess, among others. Strawberry soda can also be marketed as Red Pop.

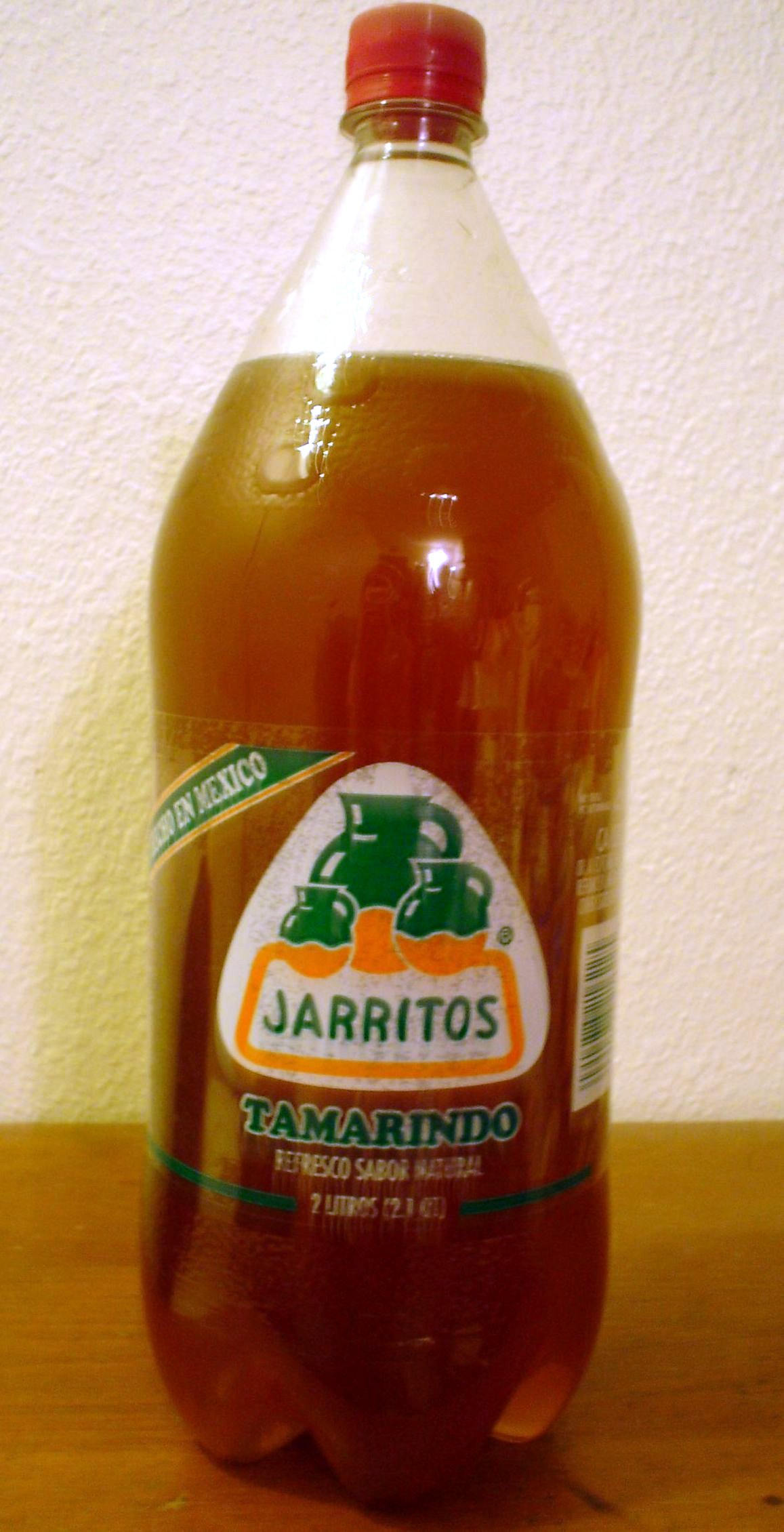
A bottle of Jarritos tamarind soda

- Tamarind – such as Jarritos Tamarindo
- Tarragon – for example Tarhun
- Vanilla – such as Coca-Cola Vanilla, and an ice cream float
- Watermelon – such as Jarritos brand
- Wintergreen
Soft drink flavors

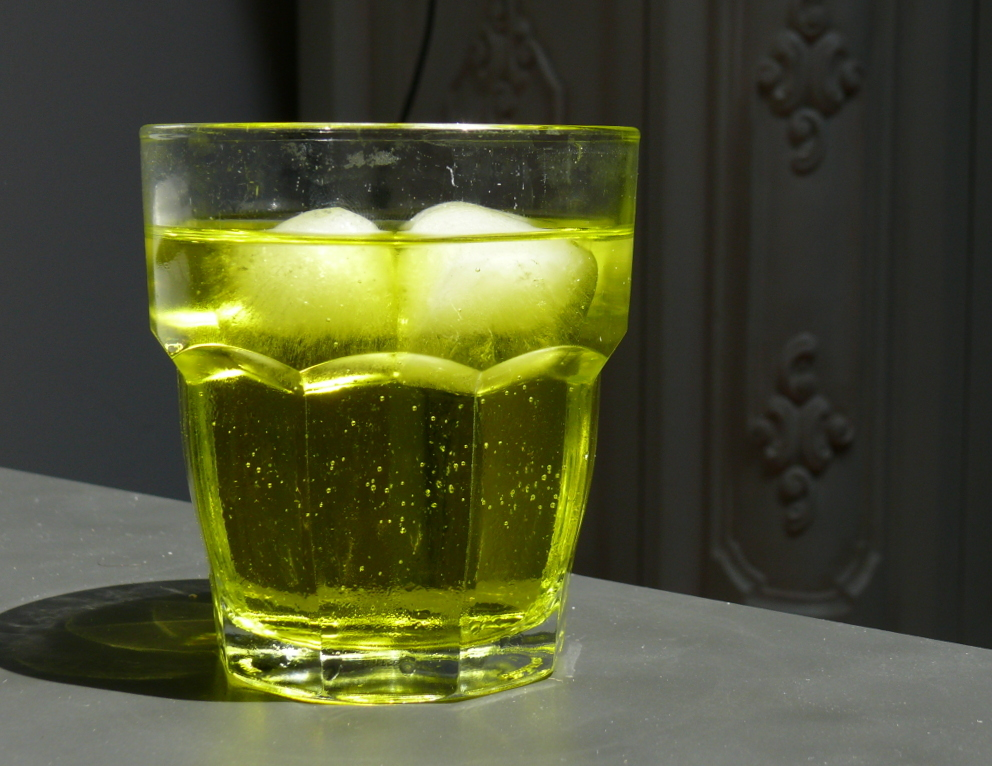
Cedrata Tassoni is an Italian, citron-flavored soft drink brand.

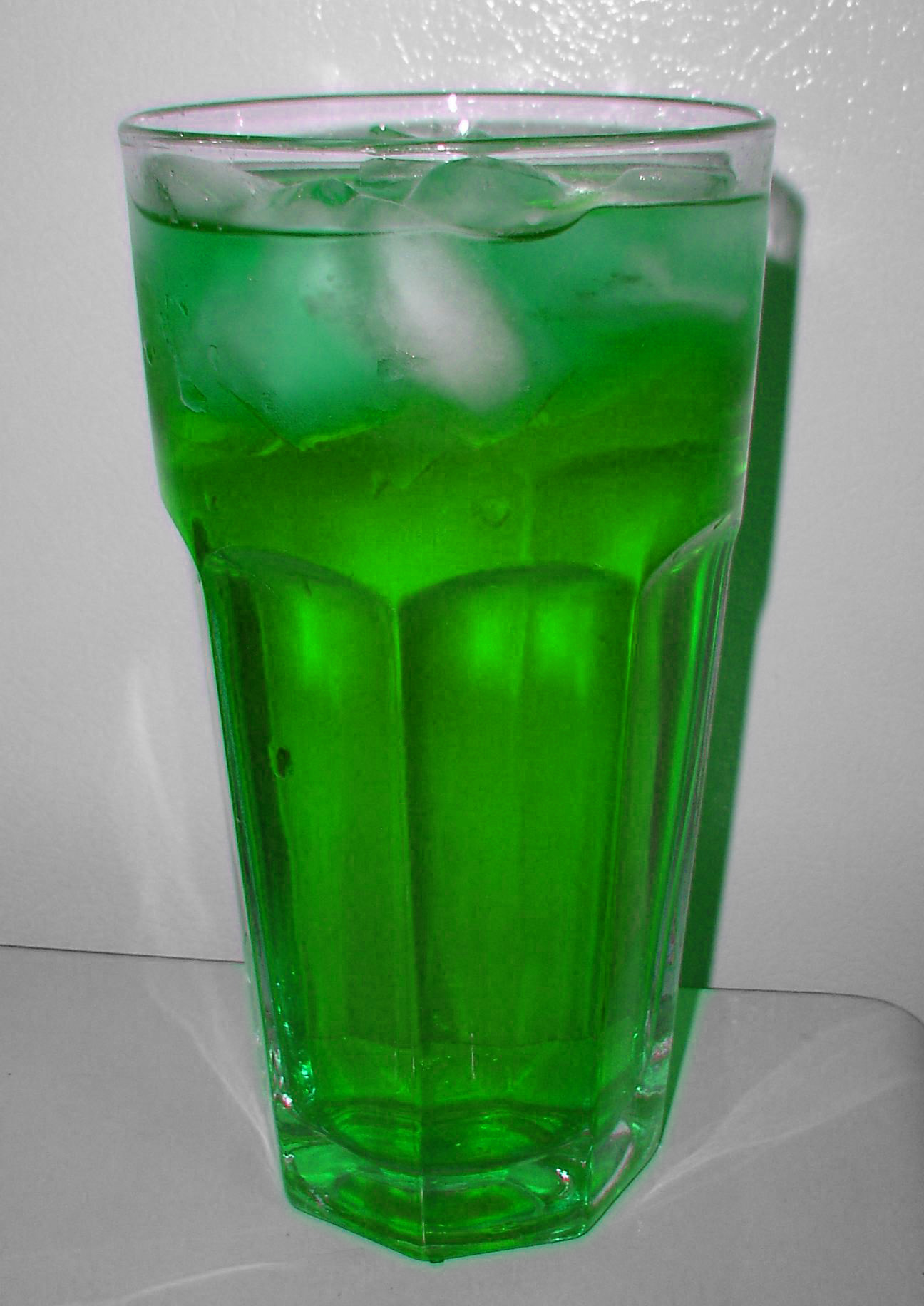
A mint-flavored soft drink prepared with mint syrup, water and ice

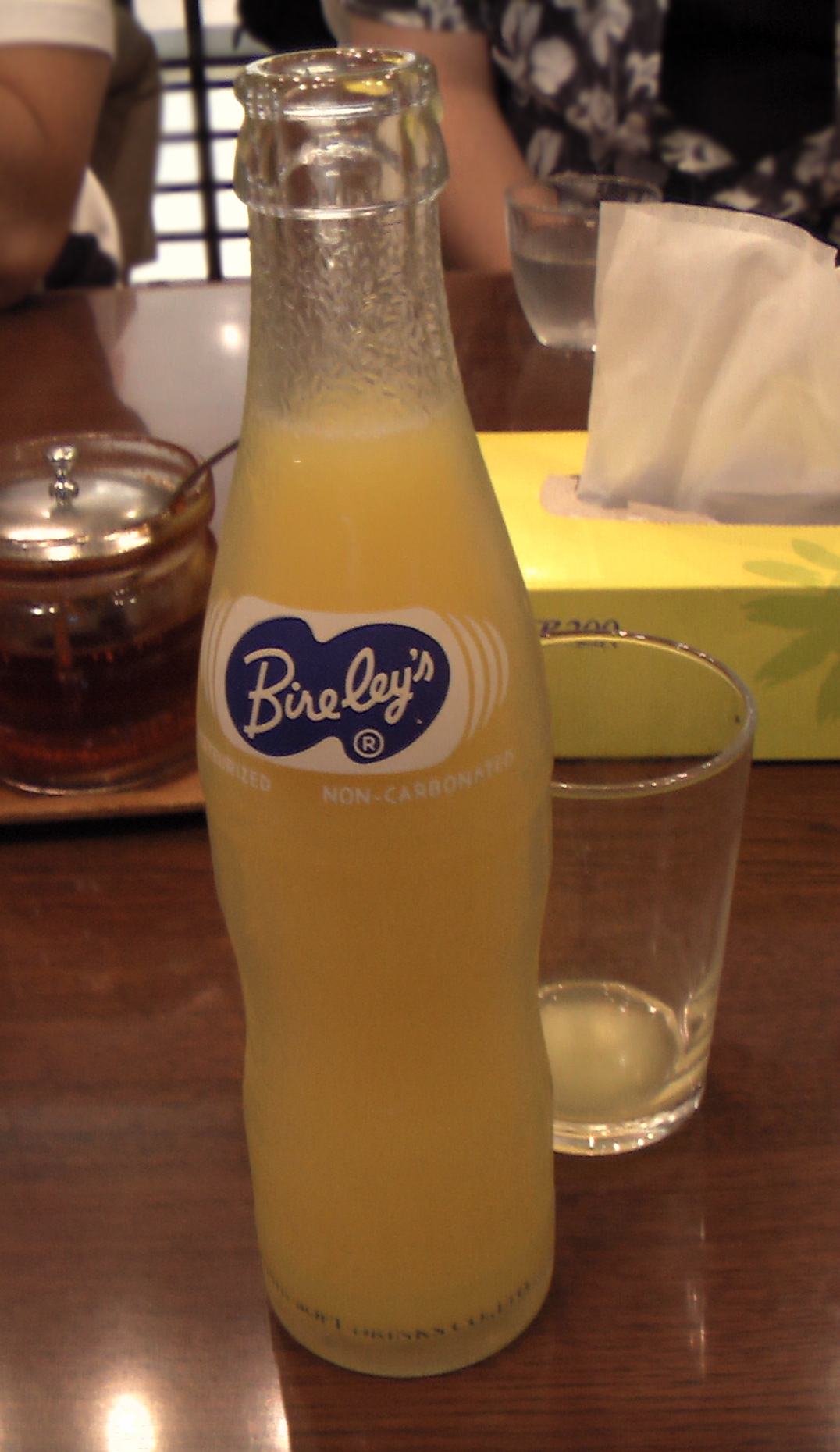
A bottle of Birelays orange soda

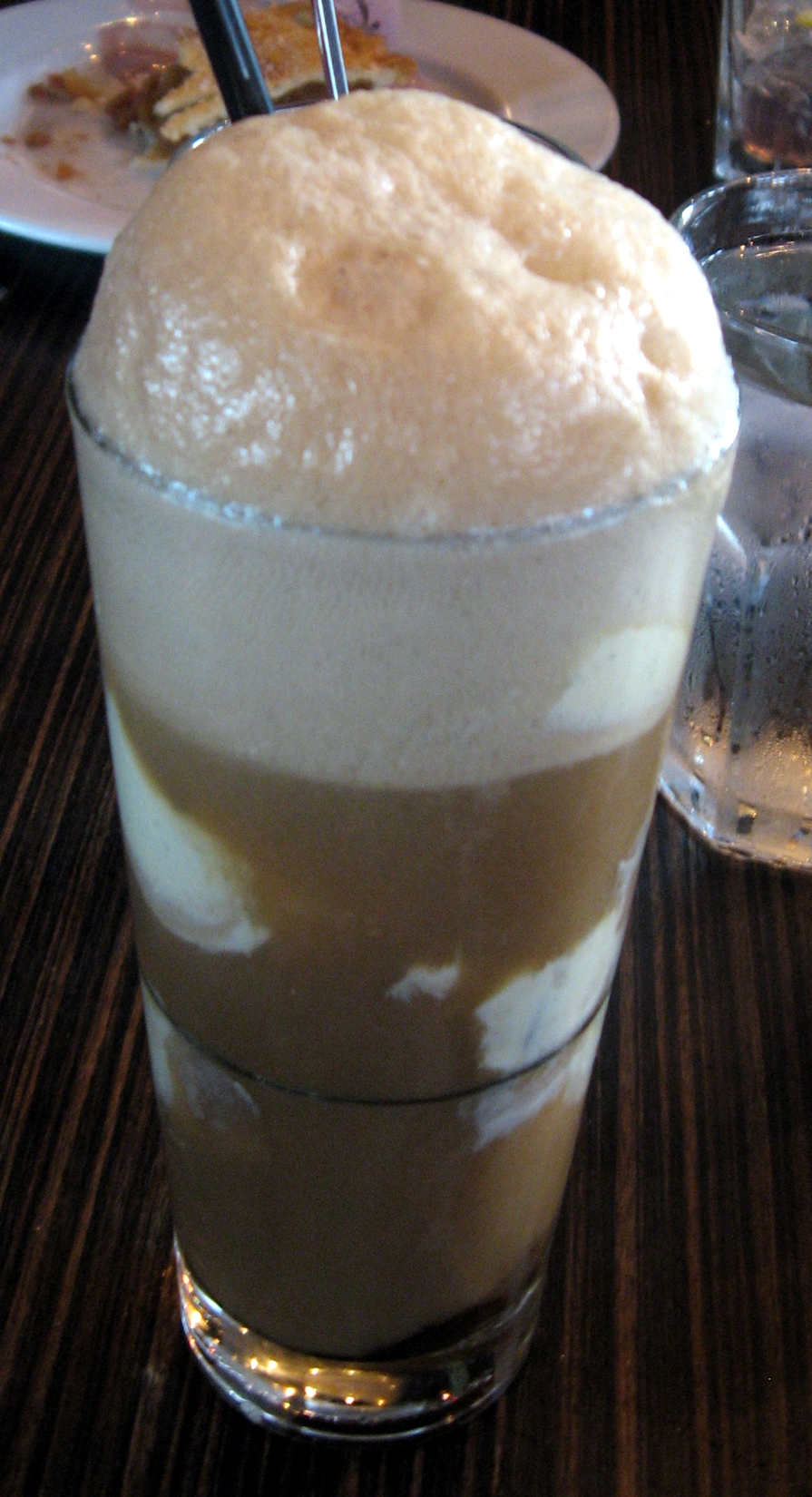
A root beer float, a type of ice cream soda

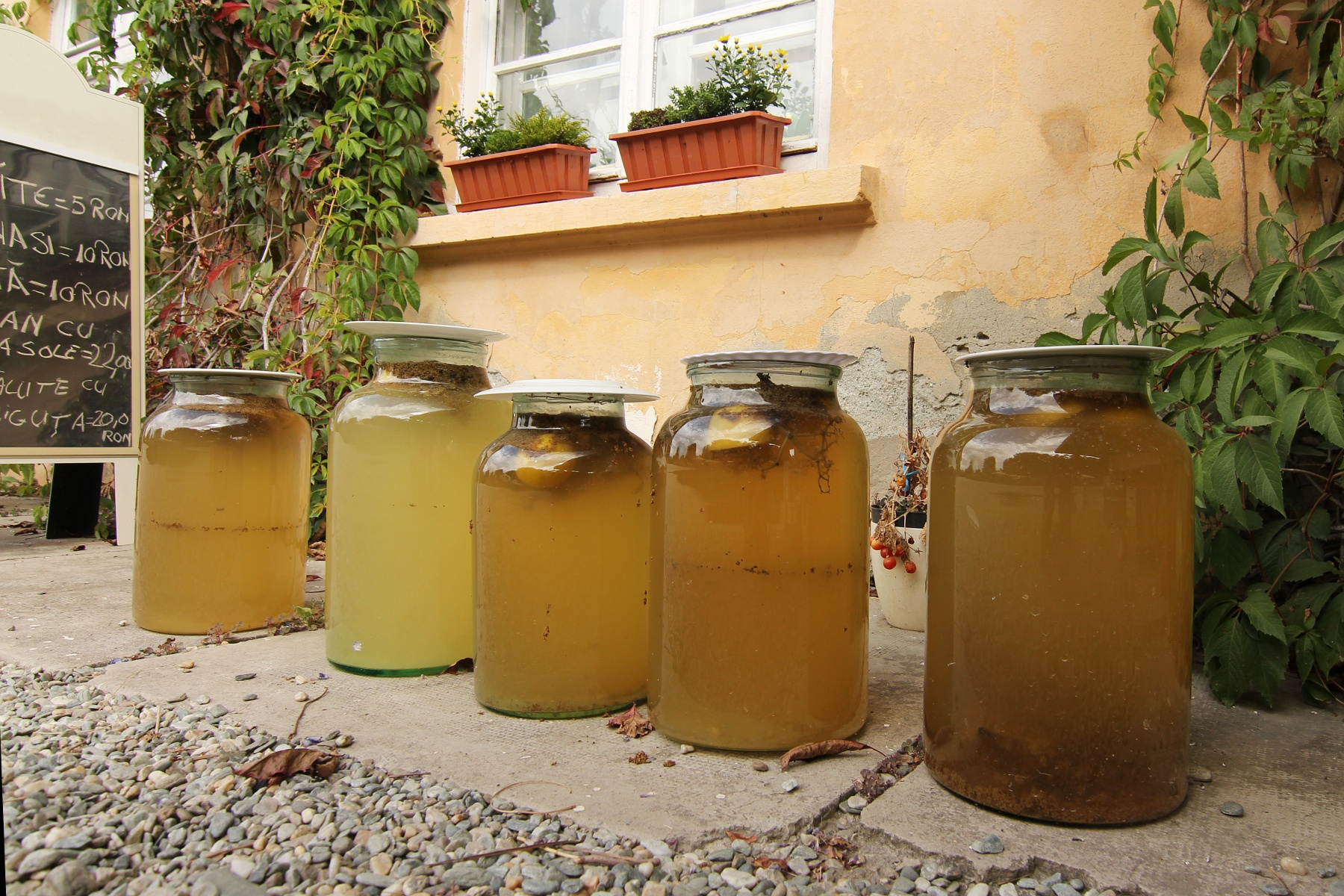
Socată is a traditional Romanian soft drink made from the flowers of the European elder (or elderberry) shrub, Sambucus nigra (soc in Romanian).

=== Specialty ===
- Bludwine/Budwine – brand of cherry-flavored soft drink that was produced in the United States by the Bludwine Company and Bludwine Bottling Company. In 1921, the company changed the name of the soft drink product from Bludwine to Budwine. Production of Budwine stopped in the mid-1990s. As of 2009, the brand was in existence and run by two entrepreneurs in Georgia.
- Dandelion and burdock – consumed in the British Isles since the Middle Ages. It was originally a type of light mead, but over the years has evolved into the non-alcoholic soft drink commercially available today. Fentimans produces a variety of this drink.
- Bacon soda – soft drink beverage that has the flavor of bacon. Several U.S. companies produce bacon soda brands, including Jones Soda, Lockhart Smokehouse and Rocket Fizz.
- Buffalo wing – produced by Rocket Fizz
- Coffee – produced by Rocket Fizz
- Espresso – produced by Manhattan Special
- Julebrus – Norwegian soft drink, usually with a festive label on the bottle. It is brewed by most Norwegian breweries as a Christmas drink for minors, who are not eligible (by law) to enjoy the traditional juleøl (English: Christmas ale), but is also very popular among adults as well.
- Open-source cola – any cola soft drink produced according to an open-sourced recipe
- PepperElixir, – produced by Orca Beverage Inc.
- Ranch dressing – produced by Rocket Fizz
- Squash – non-alcoholic concentrated syrup mixed with water or carbonated water to create a soft drink
Specialty soft drink flavors

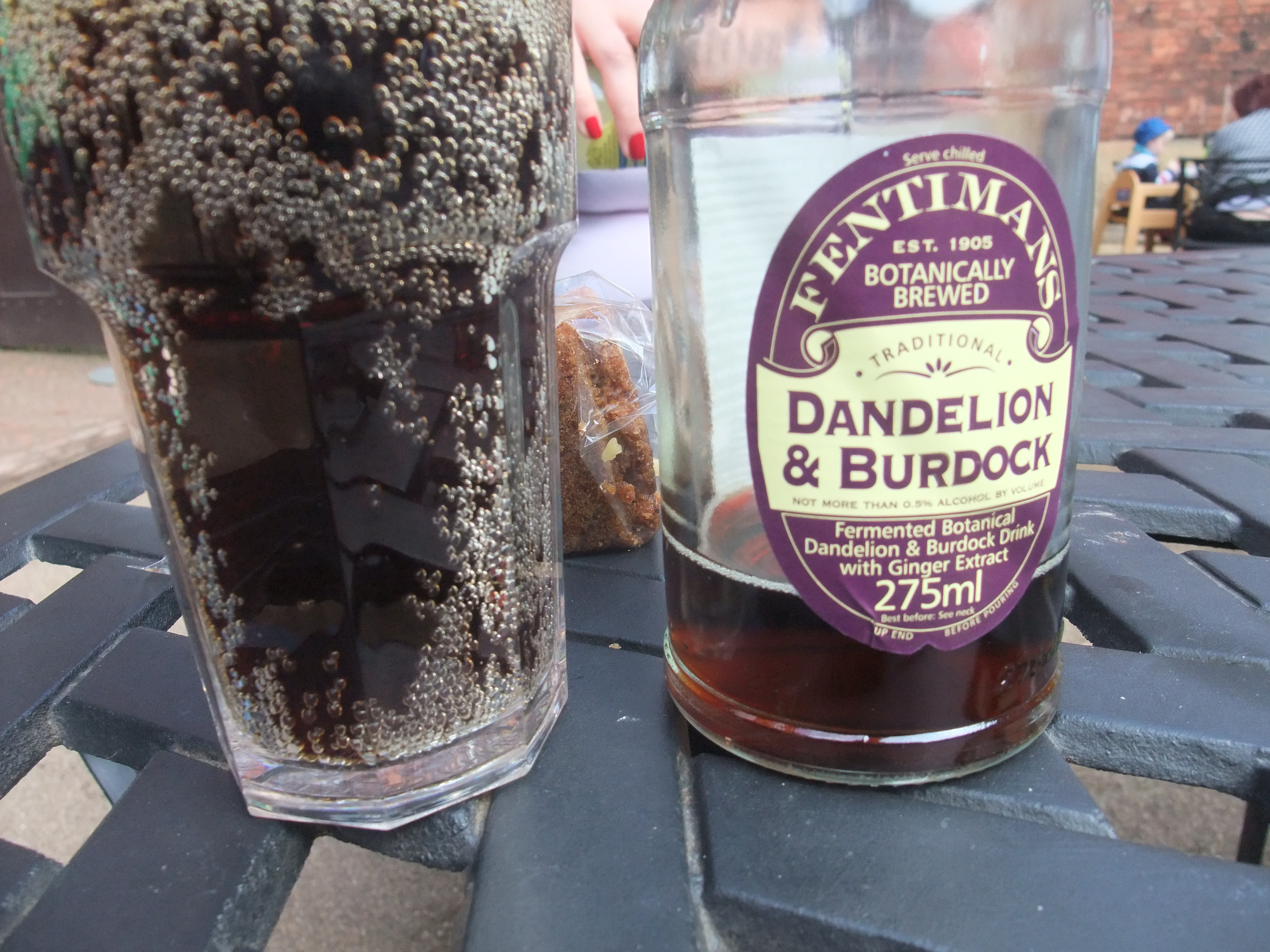
Dandelion and burdock soda, produced by Fentimans

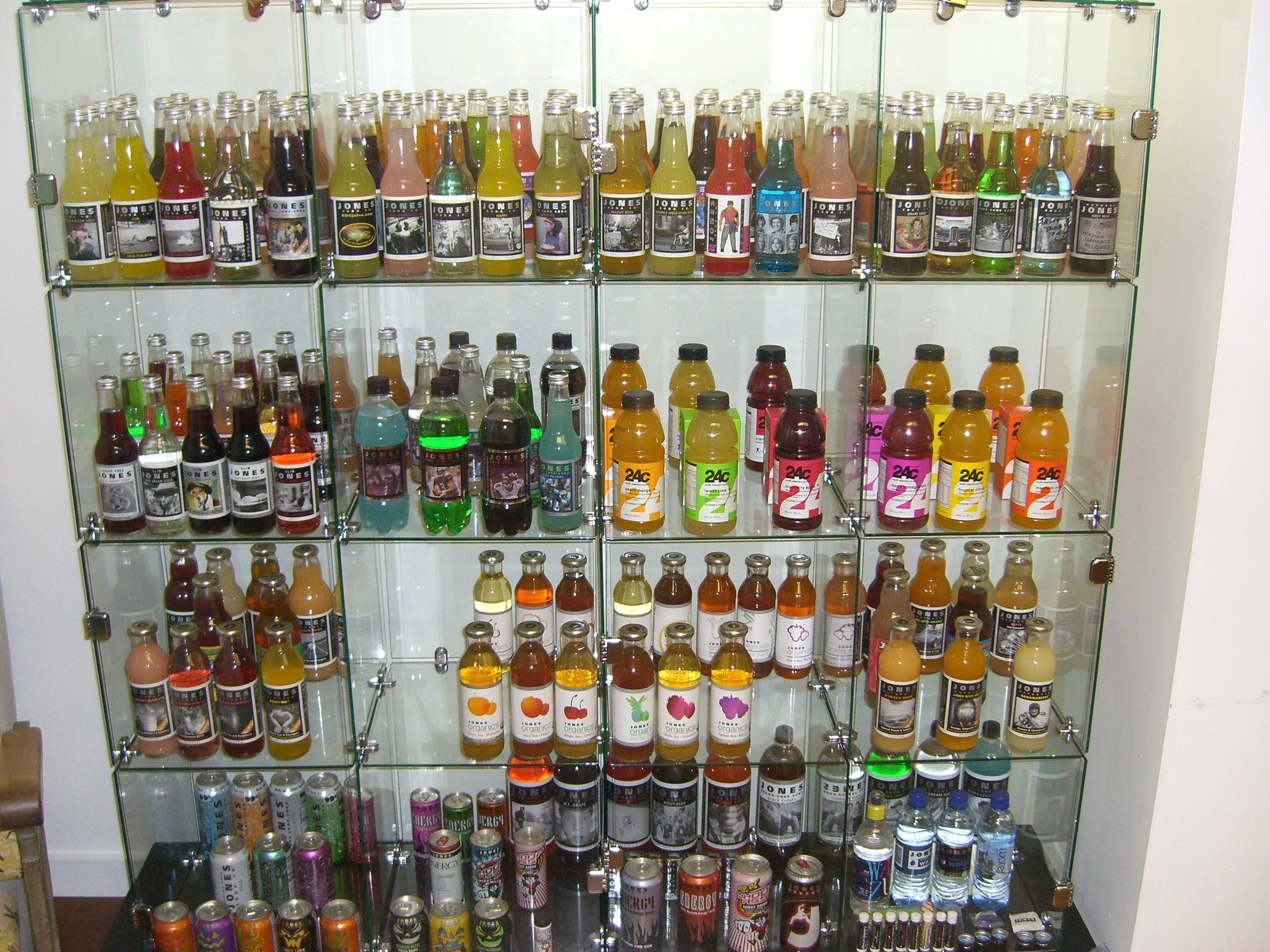
Various flavors of Jones Soda

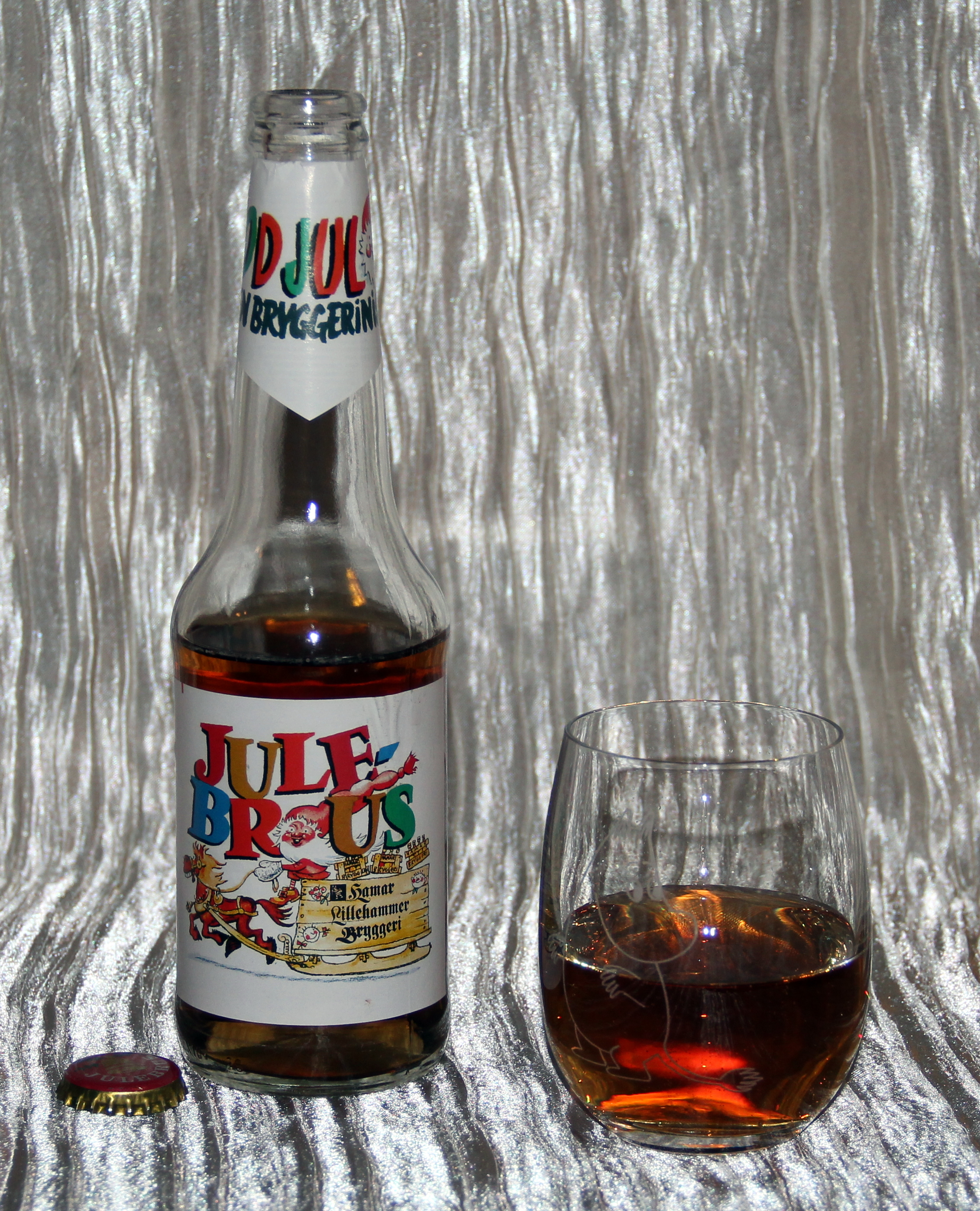
This bottle of julebrus is a seasonal soda consumed during the Christmas season in Norway.

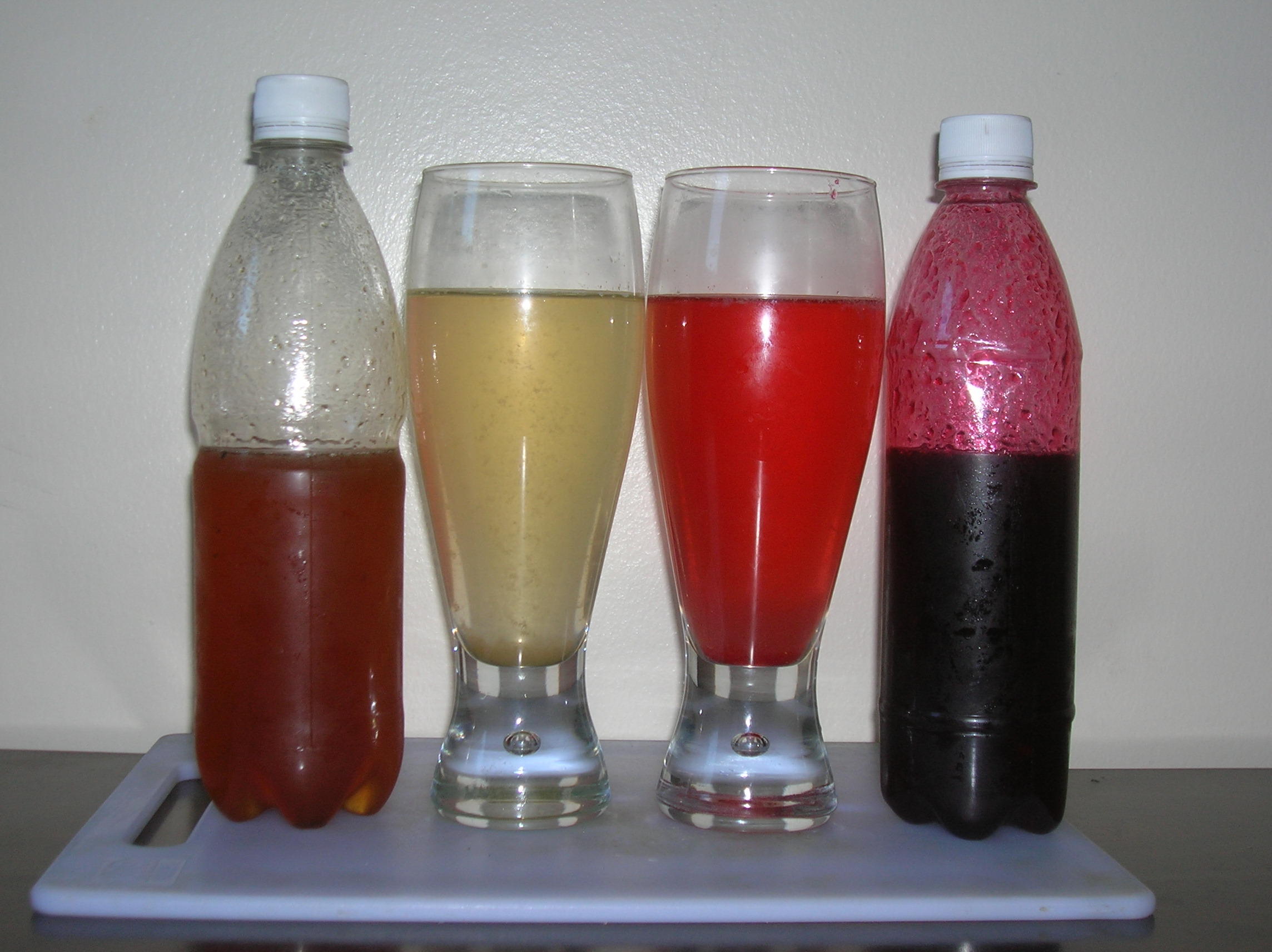
Fruit-flavored squash before and after being mixed with water

== See also ==
- Slushy
- Ice cream float
- List of soft drink products by brand name
- Orange soft drink
- List of soft drink producers
- List of soft drinks by country
- Non-alcoholic drink
- Sports drink
