= PPG Paints Arena =

Multi-purpose indoor arena in Pittsburgh, Pennsylvania, U.S.

- The Paint Can; The House that Crosby Built

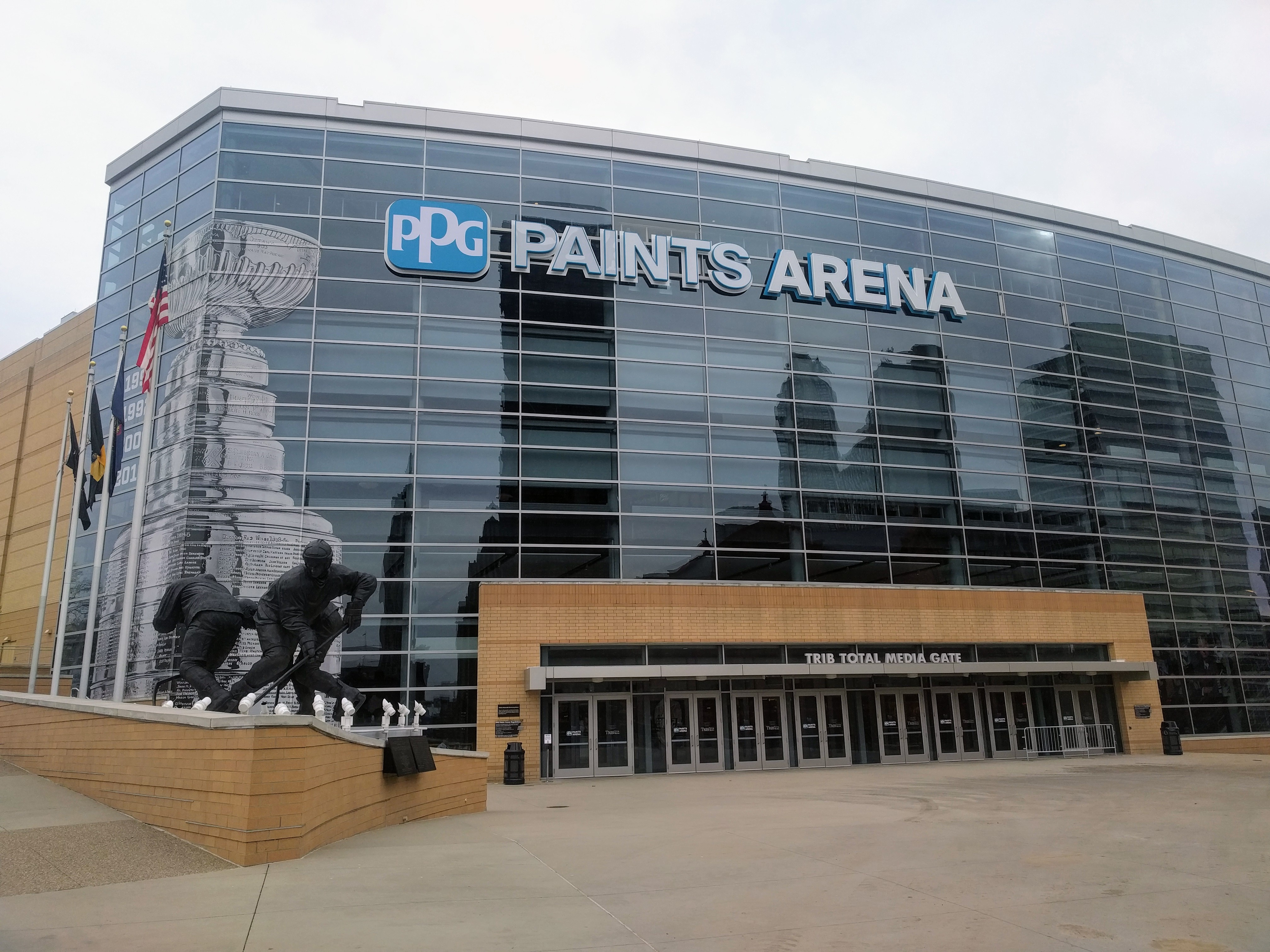
- PPG Paints Arena in 2017

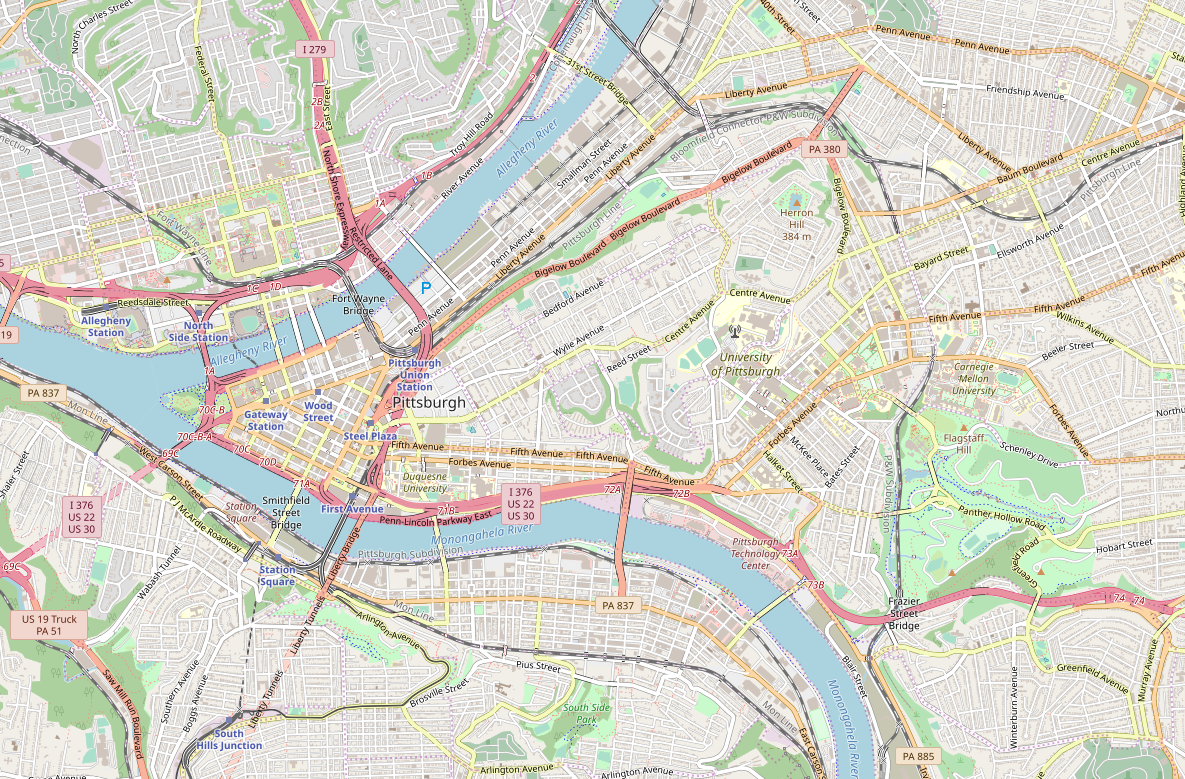
- Location near Downtown Pittsburgh Location in Pennsylvania Location in the United States
- Former names: Consol Energy Center (2010–2016)
- Address: 1001 Fifth Avenue
- Location: Pittsburgh, Pennsylvania, U.S.
- Coordinates: 40°26′22″N 79°59′21″W
- Owner: Sports & Exhibition Authority of Pittsburgh and Allegheny County
- Operator: Anschutz Entertainment Group
- Capacity: Basketball: 19,000; Concerts: 14,536–19,758; Ice hockey: 18,087 (2010–2011); 18,387 (2011–2023); 18,187 (2023–present)
- Surface: Multi-surface (ice)
- Scoreboard: Mitsubishi; 15' × 25' "Black-Packaged LED"
- Field size: 720,000 sq ft (67,000 m^{2})
- Public transit: Steel Plaza

Construction
- Groundbreaking: August 14, 2008
- Built: August 2008 – August 2010
- Opened: August 18, 2010
- Cost: US$321 million ($480 million in 2025 dollars)
- Architects: Populous (formerly HOK Sport); Astorino; Architectural Innovations; Fukui Architects; Lami Grubb
- Project manager: ICON Venue Group
- Structural engineer: Thornton Tomasetti/Raudenbush
- Services engineers: M-E Engineers, Inc.
- General contractor: Hunt Construction Group
- Main contractors: Oxford Development; Pittsburgh Arena Development, LP

Tenants
- Pittsburgh Penguins (NHL) (2010–present); Pittsburgh Power (AFL) (2011–2014)

Website
- ppgpaintsarena.com

PPG Paints Arena is a multi-purpose indoor arena in Pittsburgh, Pennsylvania, that serves as the home of the Pittsburgh Penguins of the National Hockey League (NHL). It previously was the home of the Pittsburgh Power of the Arena Football League (AFL) from 2011 to 2014.

Construction was completed on August 1, 2010, and the arena opened in time for the 2010–11 NHL season. It replaced the Penguins' former arena, Civic Arena (formerly known as Mellon Arena), which was completed in 1961. A ceremonial ground-breaking was held on August 14, 2008. The arena is the first Leadership in Energy and Environmental Design (LEED) gold-certified arena in both the NHL and AFL. Soon after the arena opened in 2010 it was named "Best New Major Concert Venue" in the Pollstar Concert Industry Awards and "Best NHL Arena" in the Sports Business Journal reader poll. The arena was originally named Consol Energy Center (CEC) after Consol Energy purchased the naming rights in December 2008. The current name comes from Pittsburgh-based PPG Industries, who purchased naming rights in October 2016.

== Planning and funding ==
Soon after buying the Penguins in 1999, Mario Lemieux began exploring a replacement for Pittsburgh Civic Arena, the oldest arena in the NHL (built in 1961). In an attempt not to use public funding, the Penguins filed for a slots license under the Pennsylvania Gaming Control Board. The Penguins were granted the license, though the decision of which casino company would receive approval was the Gaming Control Board's decision. The Lemieux Group reached an agreement with Isle of Capri Casinos, which offered to fully fund a US$290 million arena, if Capri could also construct a $500 million casino nearby. Other casinos, including Majestic Star Casino and Forest City Enterprises, also agreed to partially contribute to the arena's funding. On December 20, 2006, the Gaming Control Board awarded the license to Majestic Star Casino, who agreed to pay $7.5 million for the first 30 years, in addition to the Penguins paying $4 million per year. The casino experienced financial difficulty, which could have led to taxpayers financing the entire project. However, on August 14, 2008, the Pennsylvania Gaming Control Board selected Neil Bluhm to take ownership of the casinos, which pulled the casinos out of risk of bankruptcy. The casino, now known as the Rivers Casino, eventually opened on August 9, 2009, in the North Side Chateau neighborhood.

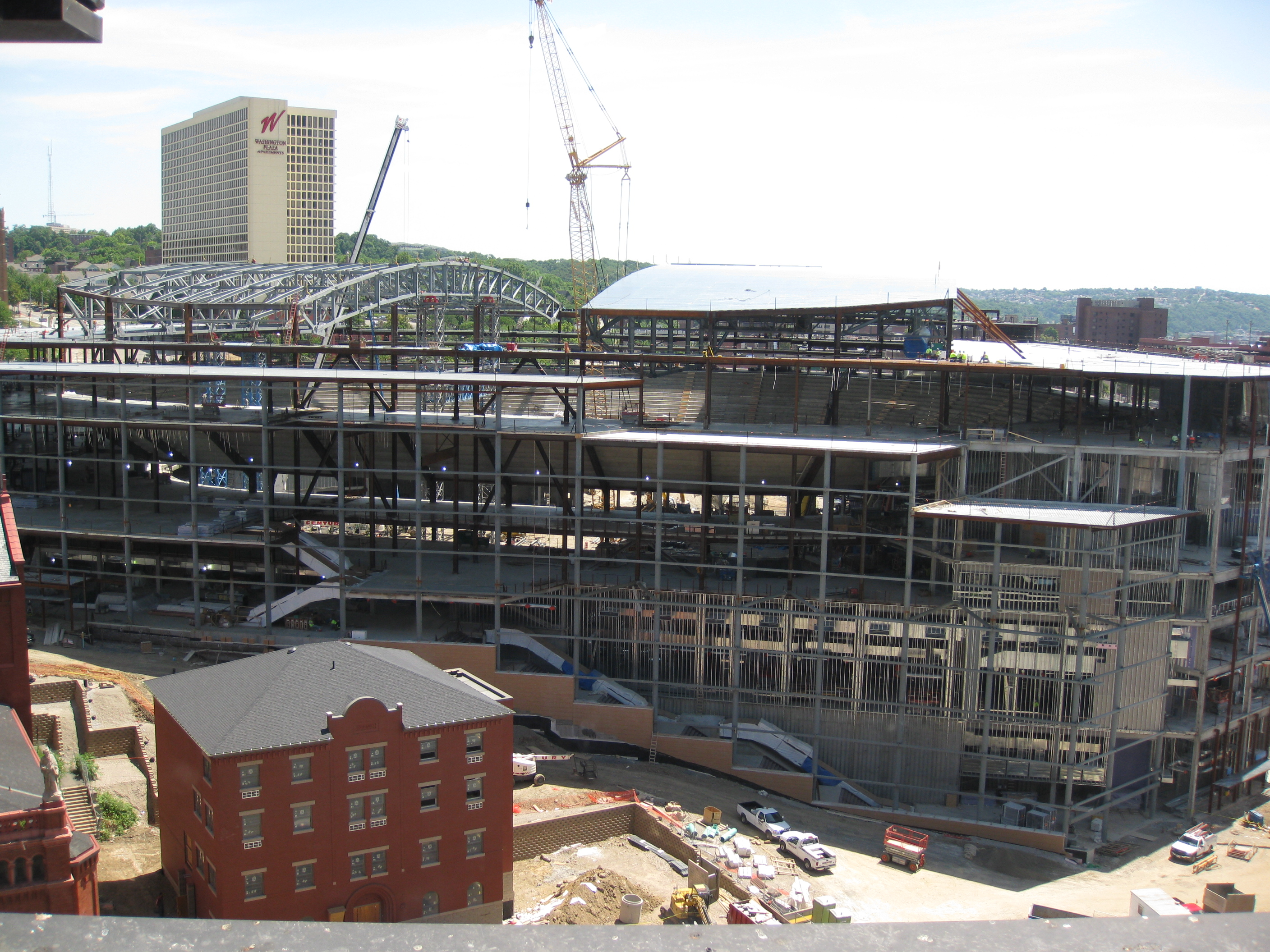
The arena in July 2009

The arena's funding plan was agreed upon by Lemieux, Pittsburgh mayor Luke Ravenstahl, and Pennsylvania governor Ed Rendell on March 13, 2007, after much negotiation. During negotiations, the Penguins explored moving the franchise to Kansas City or Las Vegas (the latter of which received an NHL expansion team in 2017); after the deal was made the Penguins agreed to stay in Pittsburgh for at least 30 more years. Lemieux later stated that relocating the franchise was never a possibility, but instead it was a negotiation tactic to help the team get funding for the arena from both state and local officials. The arena was originally scheduled to open for the 2009–10 NHL season; however, this was pushed back to the 2010–11 NHL season. The arena was expected to cost approximately $290 million, but rose to $321 million due to increased cost of steel and insurance. The Penguins agreed to pay $3.8 million per year toward construction, with an additional $400,000 per year toward capital improvements. After $31 million cost rise, the Penguins pledged an additional $15.5 million, while the State and Sports and Exhibition Authority split the difference. In September 2009, the State contributed an additional $5.08 million from the "Pennsylvania Gaming Economic Development and Tourism Fund" to cover a rising "interest on variable rate bonds".

== Design and construction ==
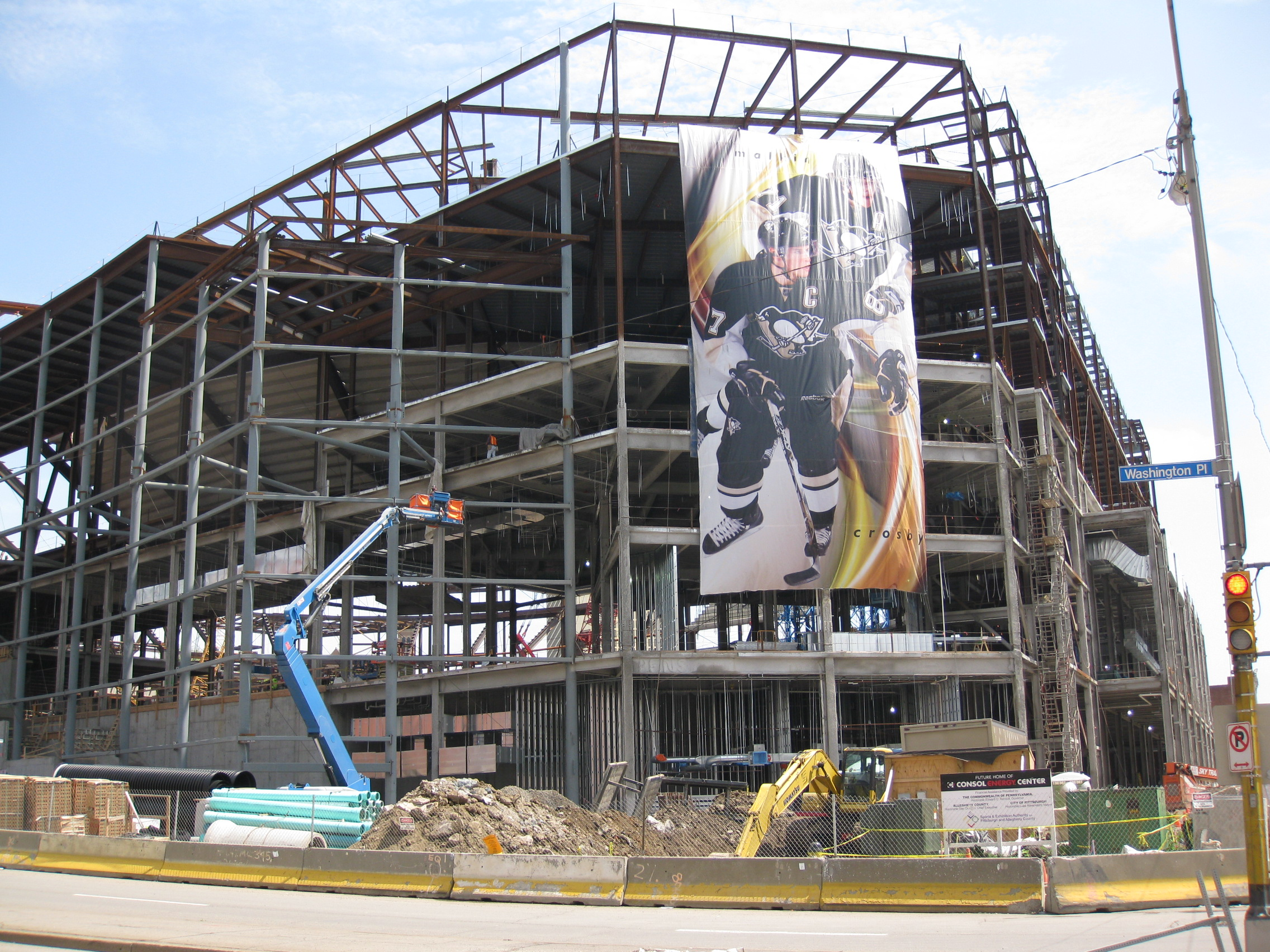
The arena in May 2009

Populous, designers of PNC Park and Heinz Field, designed the building working with local architect Astorino to develop the construction documents, while the ICON Venue group and Oxford Development oversaw the building of the arena. More than a dozen buildings were razed in order to create room for the new arena. On April 8, 2008, Populous presented design renderings to the Pittsburgh City Planning Commission, receiving negative feedback. Local architect Rob Pfaffmann went so far as to say, "If I put a Home Depot sign on that, it looks like a Home Depot." Populous returned on May 6 with new plans, which were unanimously approved by the City Planning Commission.

"This is going to be, technologically, one of the most advanced buildings in the country."

— David Morehouse, Penguins president

The Penguins have contacted the Pittsburgh Technology Council, which includes 1,400 businesses, in order to find new technologies to implement into the arena's design. On demand replays from touch-screens will be available in luxury suites, while "Yinz Cam"—a system developed by Carnegie Mellon University students—will allow any fans to view instant replays from multiple angles on their cell phones. The arena's capacity will be 18,087 for hockey, in honor of Sidney Crosby's number 87, and 19,000 for basketball games. The venue will hold 14,536 to 19,758 for concerts, depending on the layout. The venue will also include 1,950 club seats and 66 suites, in honor of Mario Lemieux's number 66. Ticket prices will range from $115,000 to $150,000 per season for luxury boxes to individual game tickets at $22. Ken Sawyer, Penguins' chief executive officer, asked that the interior be modeled after that of the venue then known as Jobing.com Arena in Glendale, Arizona. "I was just taken aback by their seats," said Sawyer, "Even when I was up in a high level, I had a great view." NHL Commissioner Gary Bettman called the building "very well designed." Bettman liked the size of the concourses and the view offered of Pittsburgh's skyline.

Mario Lemieux along with officials from the state and local governments ceremonially broke ground on a new hockey arena on August 14, 2008. Shovels, with shafts made from team captain Sidney Crosby's used hockey sticks, were used for the ground-breaking ceremony. Erection of structural steel took place from January 2009 to August 2009. While the arena was under construction, the Penguins won the Stanley Cup, and brought the Cup to the arena's construction site on July 9, 2009, during the offseason.

The arena was originally named for Consol Energy, the largest producer of bituminous coal in the United States, which signed a 21-year agreement with the Penguins in December 2008. Secondary sponsors of the arena are PNC Wealth Management, UPMC, Verizon, American Eagle Outfitters, and Dick's Sporting Goods, the last three being existing sponsors carrying over from the Civic Arena. On October 4, 2016, PPG Industries purchased the naming rights from Consol as a result of Consol wanting to get out of the naming rights deal due to the company struggling financially as a result of low energy prices. Consol, which is also planning on letting its naming rights deal for Consol Energy Park expire, will remain a corporate sponsor with the Penguins in a lesser role.

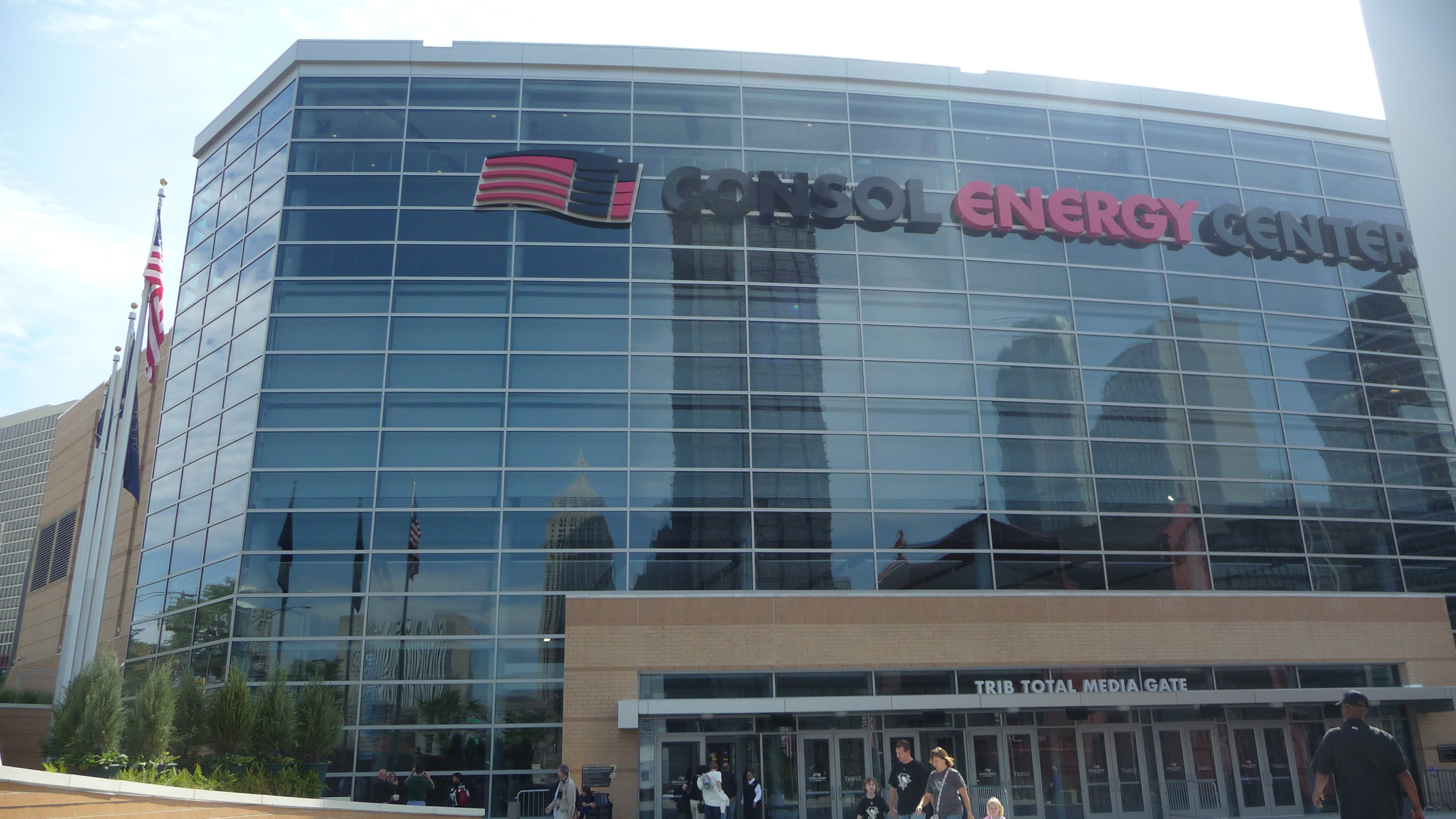
The arena with the Consol Energy Center name from 2010 to 2016

Prior to 2024, PPG Paints Arena was one of the only major sports venues whose soft drink contract was not with The Coca-Cola Company or PepsiCo. (Coca-Cola previously held the contract with Civic Arena.) Instead, Dr Pepper Snapple Group held a contract, and served its own products such as RC Cola, Diet Rite, Cherikee Red, and Sunkist Orange Soda, in addition to its more popular brands such as Dr Pepper, 7 Up, and A&W Root Beer that are typically sold alongside Coca-Cola or Pepsi products in other venues. At the time of the arena's opening, Heinz Field sold Coca-Cola products and PNC Park sold Pepsi products, making Pittsburgh's three major sporting venues initially each selling different soft drinks. In 2012, Heinz Field joined PNC Park in pouring Pepsi products, breaking a 50-year commitment with Coca-Cola, while PNC Park switched to Coca-Cola products for 2014. The final years of the Civic Arena were without a pouring rights contract due to its impending demolition. In this time, Coca-Cola retained pouring rights in fountains (seemingly due to the cost of a large scale changeover) and Dr Pepper/7 Up products were exclusively sold in bottles. This is one of the few times that a venue this large has sold products from competing soft drink companies.

As of July, 2024, Coca-Cola is the official in-game beverage provider of PPG Paints Arena.

As with most other NHL arenas, the Penguins make use of a goal horn whenever the team scores a goal at home. It is also played just before the beginning of a home game, and after the Penguins win. Their current goal horn, made by Nathan Manufacturing, Inc. and introduced in 2005 to coincide with the arrival of Sidney Crosby to the team, was brought over from the Civic Arena to the PPG Paints Arena after the Penguins closed the Civic Arena.

== Hockey ==
=== Penguins ===
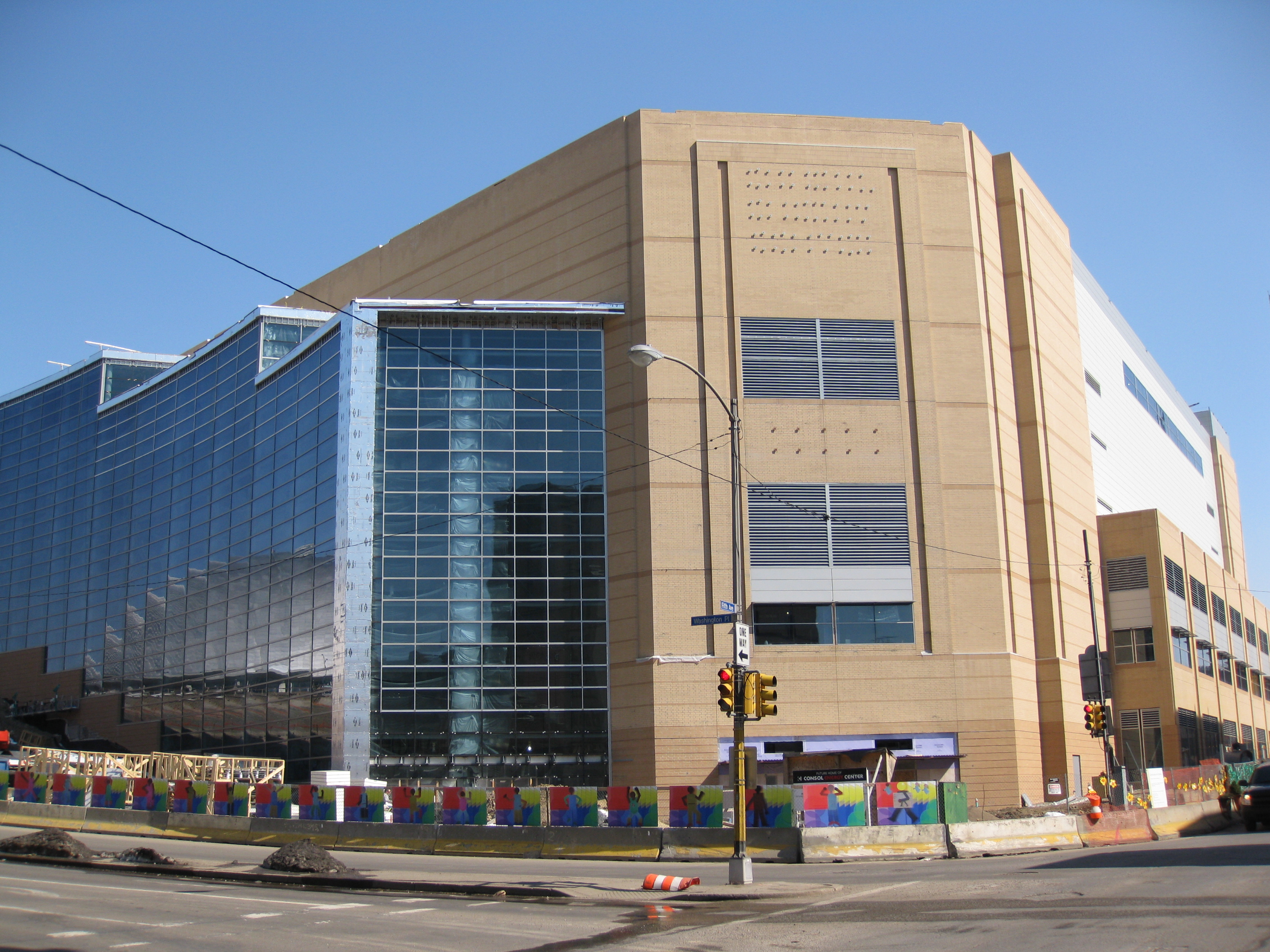
The western facade of the arena in March 2010 before it officially opened and its arena signage installed, with the Civic Arena reflected in its curtain wall window.

Team owner Mario Lemieux and captain Sidney Crosby officially opened the new ice on July 27, 2010, the same day as the official press conference to announce the 2011 NHL Winter Classic at Heinz Field. The two skated for about five minutes before being joined on the ice by a group of young hockey fans all wearing Lemieux's #66 or Crosby's #87 jerseys.

The Penguins opened the arena with a pre-season game on September 22, 2010, with a 5–1 win over the rival Detroit Red Wings. Penguins forward Mike Comrie scored the first goal in the new arena, 81 seconds into the game. The team also added a third home pre-season game to the schedule. Team President David Morehouse said, "Our feeling is that more fans will want the chance to see and experience Consol Energy Center, so we thought it made sense to add the third preseason home game."

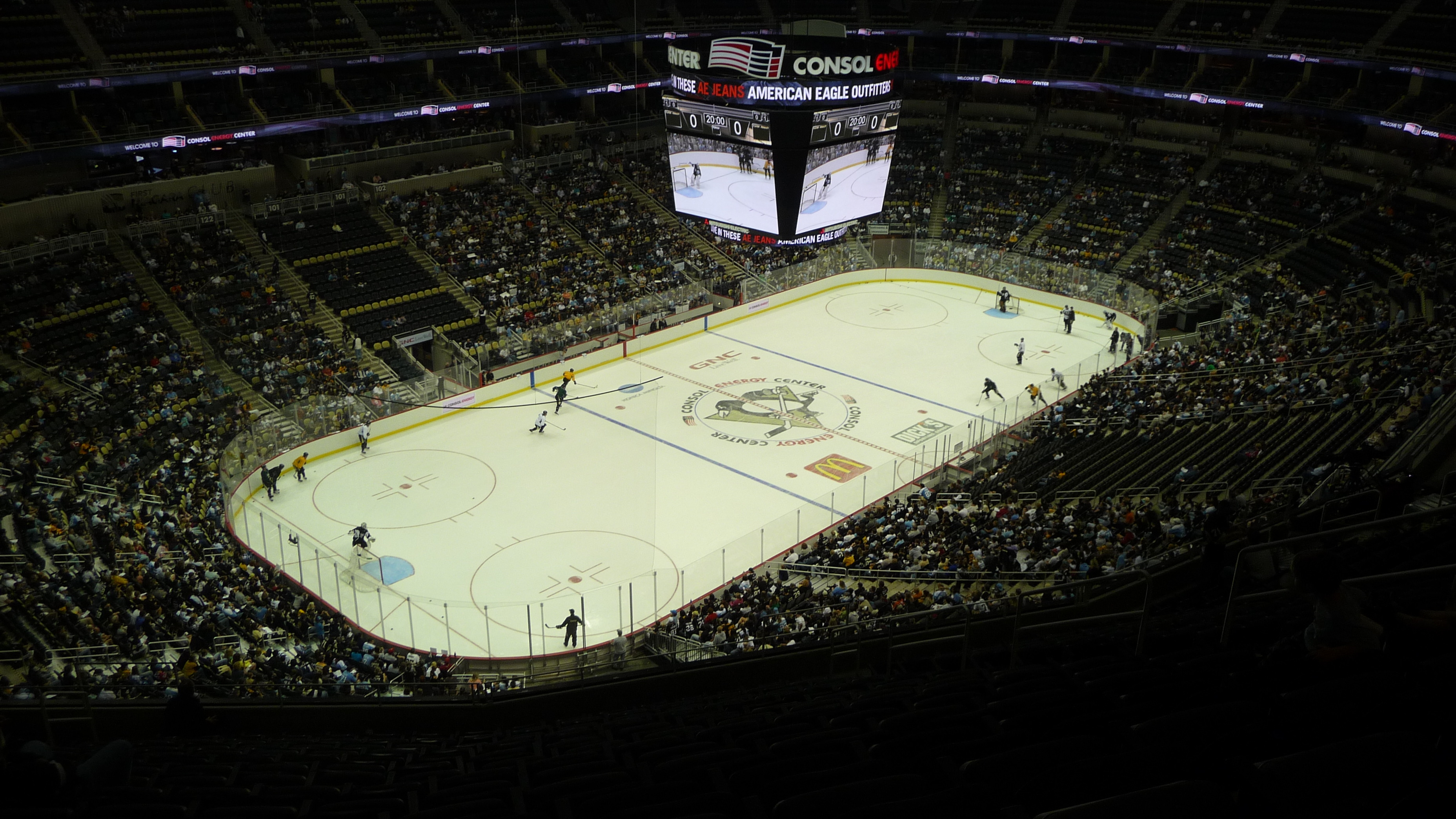
Inside PPG Paints Arena during a Penguins pre-season game in 2010.

The Penguins officially opened the building on October 7, 2010, against their cross-state rivals Philadelphia Flyers, with the Penguins falling 3–2. The first goal was scored by the Flyers forward Daniel Brière at 2:51 in the 2nd period, a power play goal. The first Penguin goal was scored by forward Tyler Kennedy 44 seconds into the third period. The stars of the game were awarded to Kennedy, Claude Giroux and Flyers rookie goaltender Sergei Bobrovsky, who made 29 of 31 saves in his NHL debut. The Penguins earned their first win at the arena on October 15, 2010, against the New York Islanders, prevailing on an overtime power-play goal by defenseman Alex Goligoski. It was also the first overtime game at the new arena. Goaltender Brent Johnson earned the win for the Penguins, making 22 saves.

The first playoff game in PPG Paints Arena was against the Tampa Bay Lightning on April 13, 2011. The first playoff goal in the building was scored by Alexei Kovalev. The Penguins would go on to win the first playoff game by a score of 3–0. Marc-André Fleury had a 32-save shutout. The Penguins would go on to lose in seven games.

During the 2011 off-season, 300 seats were added, increasing the hockey seating capacity from 18,087 to 18,387.

PPG Paints Arena hosted its first Stanley Cup Finals in 2016, which saw the Penguins defeat the San Jose Sharks in six games to clinch its fourth Cup. Although the Penguins clinched the Cup at the SAP Center (home of the Sharks), PPG Paints did host a watch party for what turned out to be the series-clinching game, charging $10 for admission with all proceeds going to the Pittsburgh Penguins Foundation. Concessions and the team store were open, and the arena's goal horn played after every Penguins goal just like at a regular home game. The arena hosted a similar watch party the following year for game six while the Penguins played the Nashville Predators at Bridgestone Arena, which like the year before turned out to be the series-clinching game for the Penguins' fifth Cup.

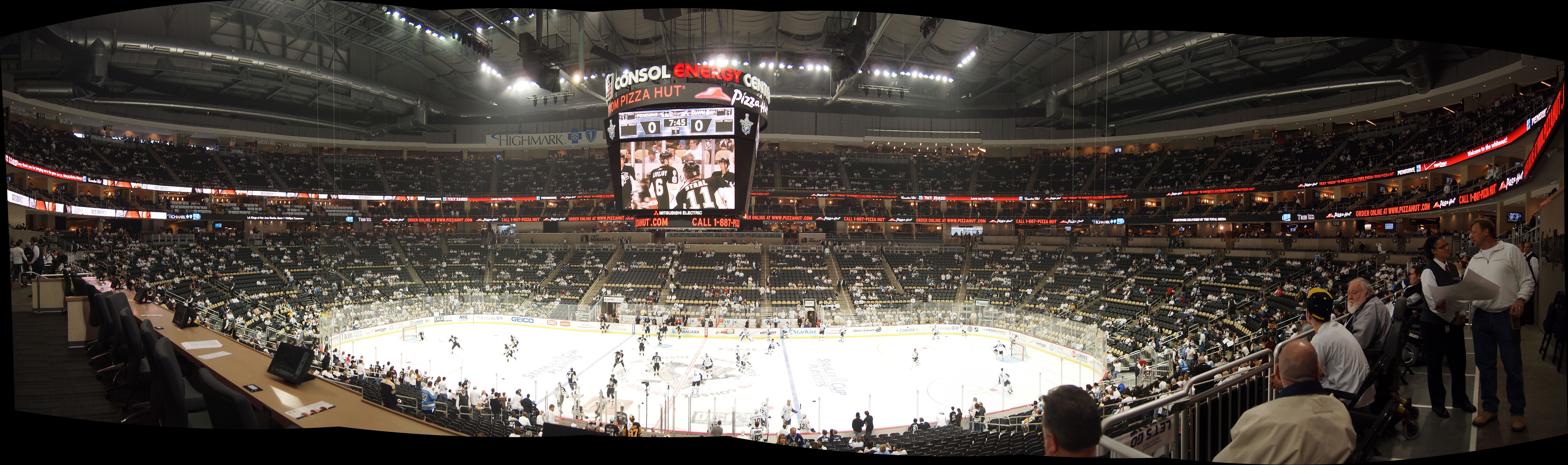
Panorama view of the lower bowl of PPG Paints Arena before the first playoff game at the arena in 2011.

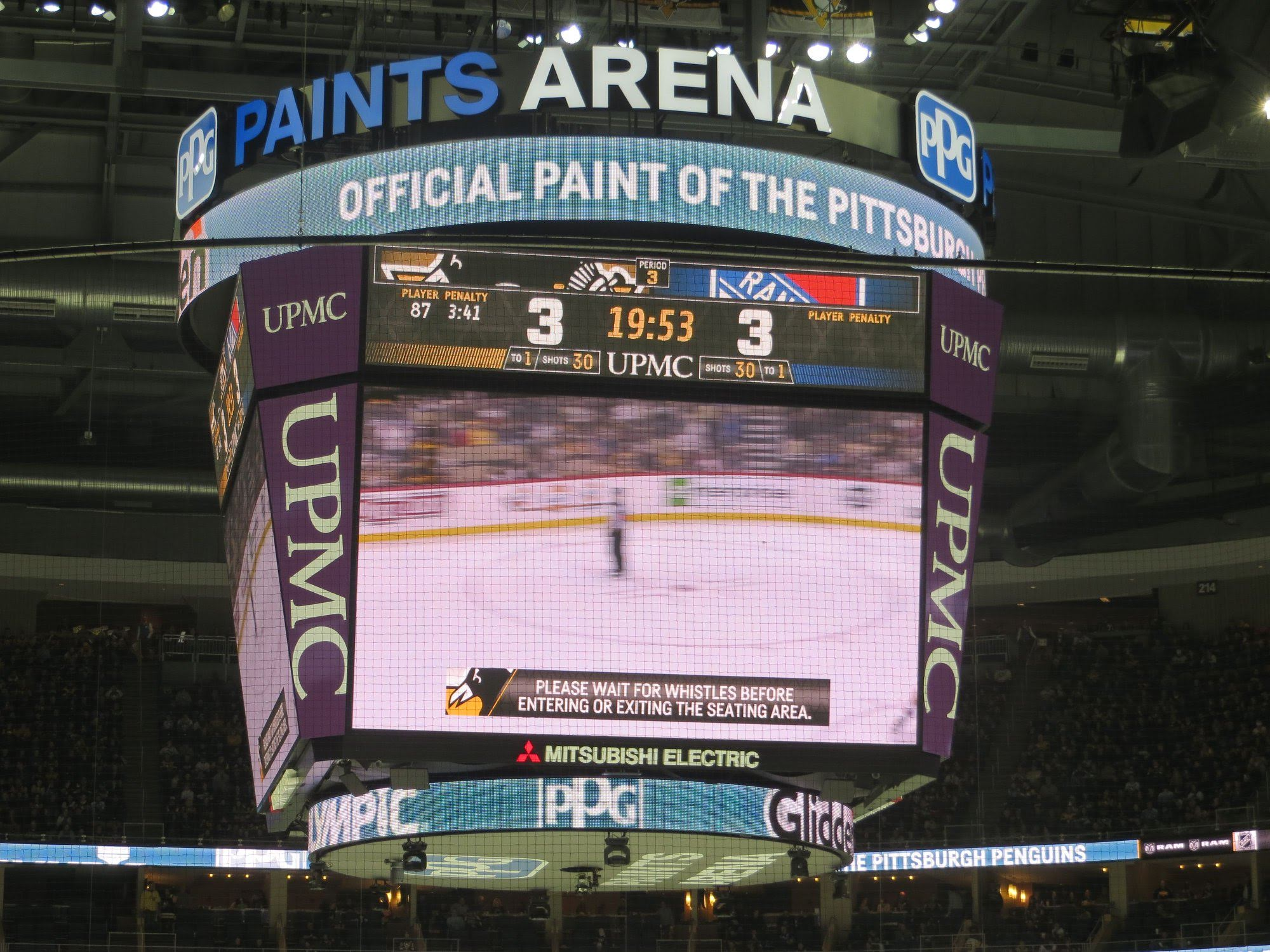
The scoreboard of PPG Paints Arena in Pittsburgh, PA during a Penguins vs. Rangers game in 2019.

=== Collegiate ===
On July 13, 2010, the arena was selected to host the 2013 NCAA Frozen Four, scheduled for April 11 and 13, 2013. The Penguins along with Robert Morris University hosted the first NCAA Division I Men's Ice Hockey championship held in the state of Pennsylvania; the event also marked the first time that an NCAA championship game in a major team sport had been held in the city of Pittsburgh. "We are absolutely thrilled to have been chosen to host the 2013 Frozen Four at the (Consol Energy Center)," RMU head men's ice hockey coach Derek Schooley said. "The Frozen Four will be a major showcase for the city of Pittsburgh as well as our emerging hockey program. This is one of the NCAA's premier events, and Robert Morris and the city of Pittsburgh will be an excellent host."

The Frozen Four returned to PPG Paints Arena in April, 2021.

In December 2012, the arena began hosting the Three Rivers Classic, an annual two-day Division I college ice hockey tournament. The inaugural tournament took place on December 28–29, 2012 and featured teams from Penn State, Robert Morris, Ohio State and Miami (Ohio). Robert Morris won the first Classic title in a 1–0 win over Miami. The event was last held in January, 2019.

The first collegiate event at PPG Paints Arena was the fifth-annual College Hockey Showcase on October 17, 2010, hosted by Robert Morris. In the event's first game the Lady Colonials were defeated 4–3 by the Northeastern Huskies. The Colonials ACHA club team beat Pitt 6–4. In the arena's first NCAA men's game, the Colonials men's team defeated Air Force, 3–2.

In conjunction with the 2011 NHL Winter Classic, held on January 2 at nearby Heinz Field, a collegiate game and an American Hockey League (AHL) game were contested at PPG Paints Arena on December 30, 2010. The first game matched the RIT Tigers men's ice hockey team against the Robert Morris Colonials; RIT won 4–3. The second game matched the top-level affiliates of the two Winter Classic teams (the Penguins and the Washington Capitals), the Wilkes-Barre/Scranton Penguins and the Hershey Bears; the Bears won 1–0.

=== PWHL ===
On March 17, 2024, the PWHL played a one-off game between the Toronto Sceptres and the Montréal Victoire (both of which were unnamed at the time) in front of a crowd of 8,850 fans, making it the largest attended women's hockey game in Pittsburgh. The PWHL later returned on January 24, 2027 for a game between the Seattle Torrent and San Jose Sea Lions.

== Basketball ==
Both the University of Pittsburgh and Duquesne University have dedicated locker rooms in the arena for use by the schools' basketball teams. Both schools made their first appearance on December 1, 2010, in the City Game, the first ever basketball game hosted in the venue. A neutral venue, Pitt was designated as the home team for the game, which the Panthers won 80–66. The first points at the arena were made by Duquesne freshman guard T. J. McConnell, with a basket at 27 seconds into the game.

The arena hosted the 2010 SEC/Big East Invitational, featuring Auburn playing Rutgers and Pittsburgh taking on Tennessee in Pitt's second appearance at PPG Paints. The games were televised nationally on ESPN2 and ESPN respectively.

Duquesne hosted three home games in the 2010–11 season: on December 12 against West Virginia, against Dayton on January 30, 2011, and against Xavier on February 13, 2011. During the 2012–2013 NHL lockout, Duquesne again hosted three home games – December 12 vs. West Virginia, January 19 vs. VCU, and February 9 vs. Xavier. For the 2013–14 basketball season, Duquesne hosted Penn State on December 11 and Dayton on February 22.

Duquesne Dukes Men's Basketball last utilized the facility for six home basketball contests during the 2019-20 season, during renovations to the UPMC Cooper Fieldhouse.

Duquesne hosted round of 64 and round of 32 games of the 2012 NCAA Division I men's basketball tournament at the arena and hosted the round of 64 and round of 32 again in 2015, 2018, 2022, and 2024.

PPG Paints Arena and Duquesne are slated to host the NCAA Men's Basketball Championship First and Second Round games again in March, 2027.

Duquesne had hosted three prior times at Civic Arena: 1997, 2001 (women's) and 2002.

The Atlantic 10 Men's Basketball Tournament was held at PPG Paints Arena in March 2017, and again in March 2026.

For their 2017–18 season and part of the 2018–19 season, the arena served as the home of the Robert Morris Colonials men's basketball team for several games while the new UPMC Events Center was constructed on campus.

Since 2023, PPG Paints Arena has hosted the annual Pittsburgh Holiday Hoops Classic featuring top local boys' and girls' high school basketball teams.

The Backyard Basketball Classic is a doubleheader men's basketball event scheduled for December 9, 2026, with Pitt returning to PPG Paints Arena to face West Virginia, and Duquesne facing Robert Morris.

During his tenure as Commissioner of the NBA, David Stern mentioned the arena as a possible home for an NBA franchise should one move to Pittsburgh.

== Arena football ==
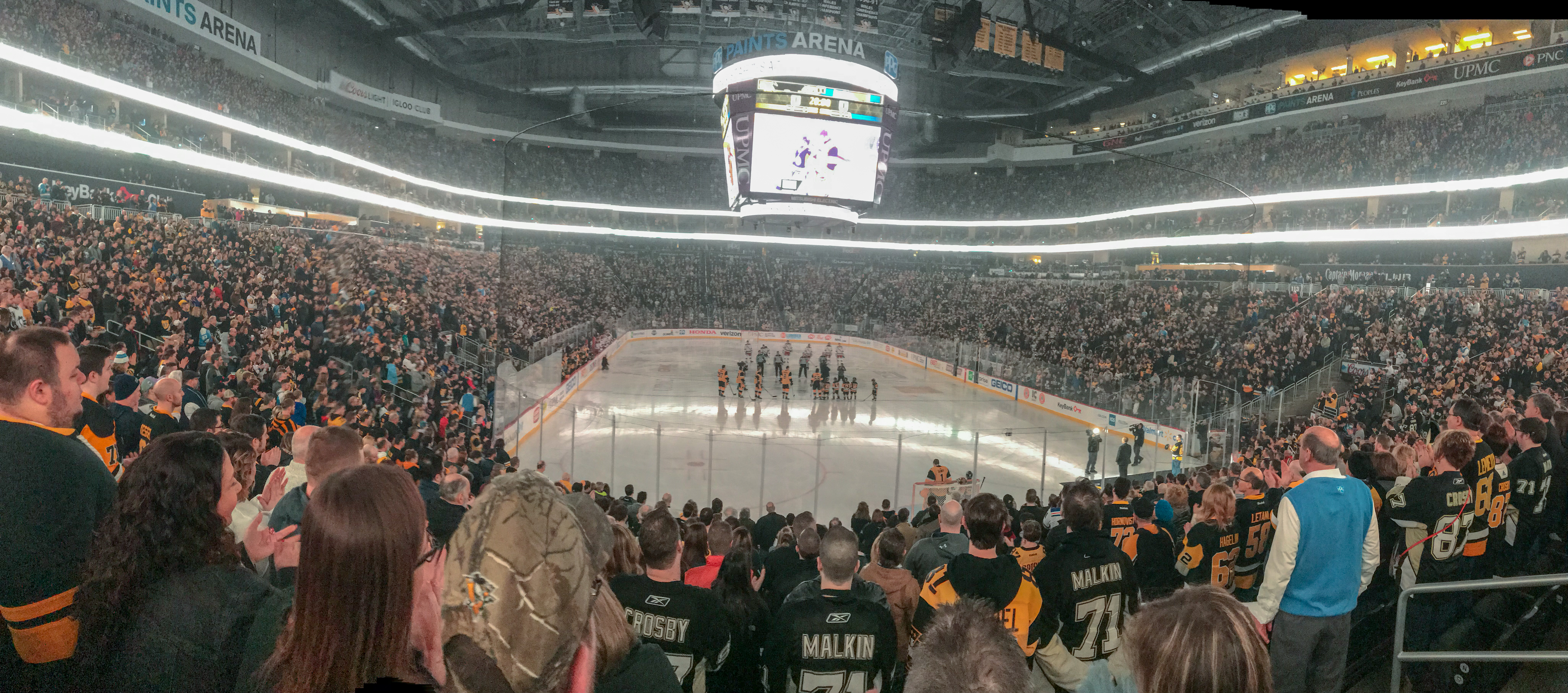
An interior panorama of PPG Paints Arena in Pittsburgh, PA

Shortly after PPG Paints was built, the Arena Football League considered starting an expansion team in the arena, but the league folded in August 2009. However, after a two-year hiatus, the AFL returned and eyed an expansion team in Pittsburgh. On August 19, 2010, news sources reported that PPG Paints Arena would be home to the Pittsburgh Power, which began play in the spring of 2011. The team's ownership group includes former Pittsburgh Steelers and Pro Football Hall of Fame member Lynn Swann. Pittsburgh was the 5th city added for the 2011 AFL season, joining the San Jose SaberCats, Kansas City Command, New Orleans VooDoo and Philadelphia Soul – who were all previous members of the Arena Football League. In nine home games, the Power averaged 9,197 fans per game, a figure that included an audience of 13,904 that showed up for the season opener against the Philadelphia Soul. Overall, the Power ranked sixth among the 18 Arena Football League teams in average attendance through 17 games that season, and its average attendance was about 1,000 people more than the AFL average.

== Gymnastics ==
In 2016, the arena hosted the Kellogg's Tour of Gymnastics Champions.

== Wrestling ==
The 2019 NCAA Division I men's wrestling championship was held at the arena in March 2019.

== Volleyball ==
In December 2019, PPG Paints Arena hosted the finals of the 2019 NCAA Division I women's volleyball tournament.

In September 2025, PPG Paints Arena hosted the nationally-televised State Farm Women's College Volleyball Showcase, featuring local squads from Pitt and Penn State, along with Arizona State and TCU.

== Professional wrestling ==
The arena has hosted various WWE pay-per-views and premium live events, including Royal Rumble in 2014, Roadblock: End of the Line in 2016, Extreme Rules in 2018 and Payback in 2023. It has also hosted various Raw and SmackDown TV shows. The arena planned to host Raw on March 16, 2020, but on March 12, the show, along with all other WWE events at that time, were canceled and relocated to the WWE Performance Center due to the COVID-19 pandemic.

== Transportation access ==
PPG Paints Arena is served by exits at Mile 1 of Interstate 579 and exits 70A and 72B of Interstate 376; it is also within 1 mile of Interstate 279. Three blocks to the west of the center is the Steel Plaza transit station of the Pittsburgh subway system.

== Events ==
The arena opened on August 18, 2010, with a performance by Paul McCartney. The demand for the first show was so great that tickets sold out within five minutes of going on sale. This prompted the addition of a second show, a day later on August 19. Originally, Pittsburgh-native Christina Aguilera was planning to open the arena on August 3, 2010. Due to conflicts with construction, Aguilera canceled her show.

== In media ==
Justified, an FX television drama that debuted in March 2010, used the center's final construction phase as a filming location to depict the "new Federal Courthouse" on the show.

Grudge Match a 2013 film shot its climactic fight scene at the PPG Paints Arena.

Preceded by Civic Arena	Home of the Pittsburgh Penguins; 2010–present	Succeeded by Current
Preceded by New Franchise	Home of the Pittsburgh Power; 2011–2014	Succeeded by Franchise Folded
Preceded by Xcel Energy Center; St. Paul, Minnesota	Host of the NHL entry draft 2012	Succeeded by Prudential Center; Newark, New Jersey
Preceded by Tampa Bay Times Forum; Tampa, Florida	Host of the Frozen Four; 2013	Succeeded by Wells Fargo Center; Philadelphia
