= Wintergreen soda =

19th-century soft drink flavor

Wintergreen soda was a flavored carbonated beverage once popular in North America. The flavoring that was added to wintergreen soda water was "nominally made out of teaberry leaves, or wintergreen." Other regional common names used to describe Gaultheria procumbens included mountain berries, wintergreen plums, or checked berries. Wintergreen soda may have originally been a homemade foodstuff but was ultimately one of the many flavors listed in the catalogs of flavoring companies serving late 19th-century soda fountain proprietors.

Carrie Giddings, a Civil War-era U.S. Army wife, relied on homemade lemon and wintergreen soda waters when she was called upon to host important guests. American nature writer Edwin Way Teale recalled it as a favorite of his childhood in Indiana: "From early days wintergreen was a flavor that gave me my greatest delight. At the ornate Canditorium, on Main Street in Michigan City, I used to reach a seventh heaven and enter in when a wintergreen soda, with coral-pink foam, was set before me."

== See also ==
- Methyl salicylate
- List of soft drink flavors
