= Julebrus =

Norwegian soft drink traditionally consumed at Christmas

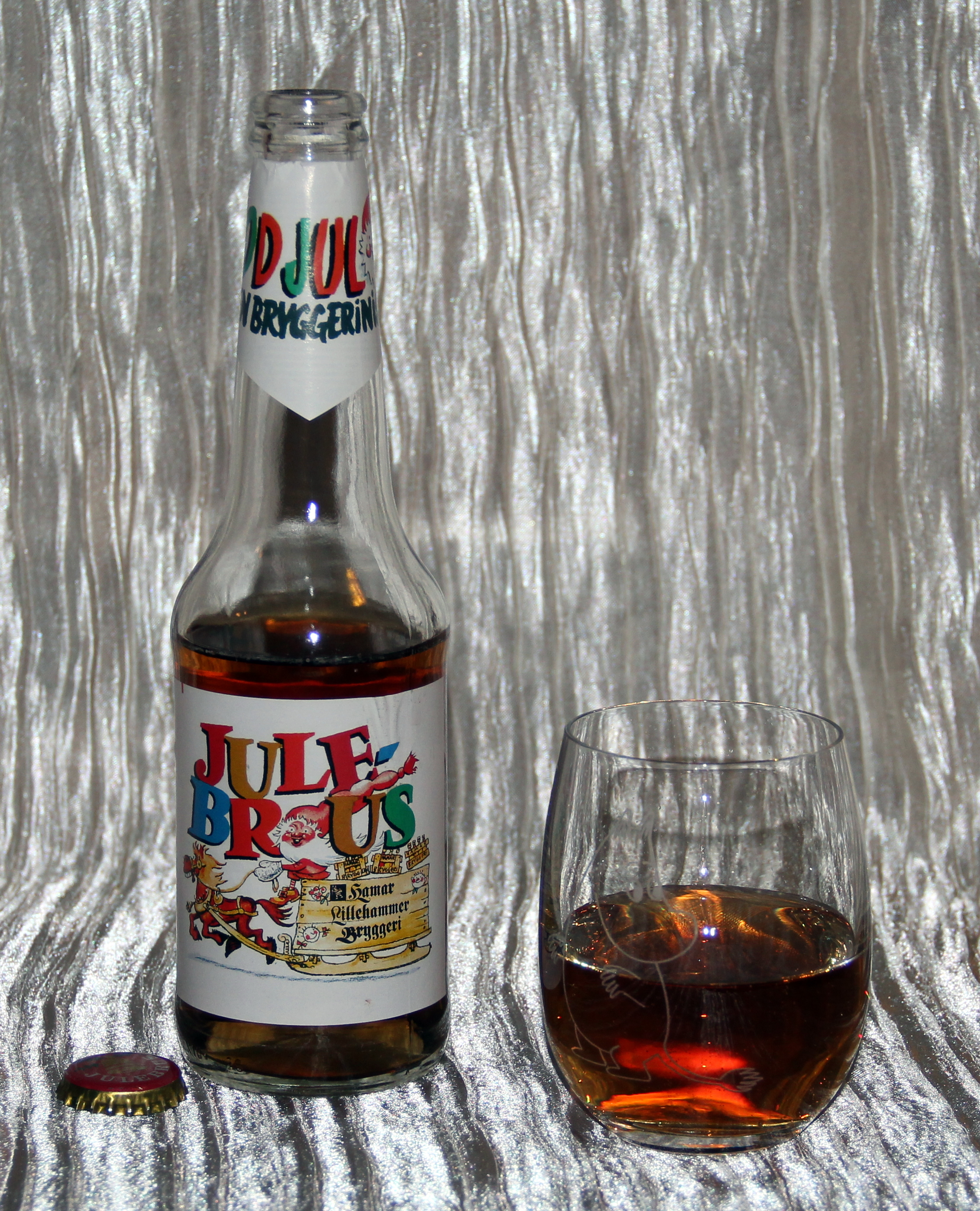
Bottle of brown Hamar og Lillehammer julebrus.

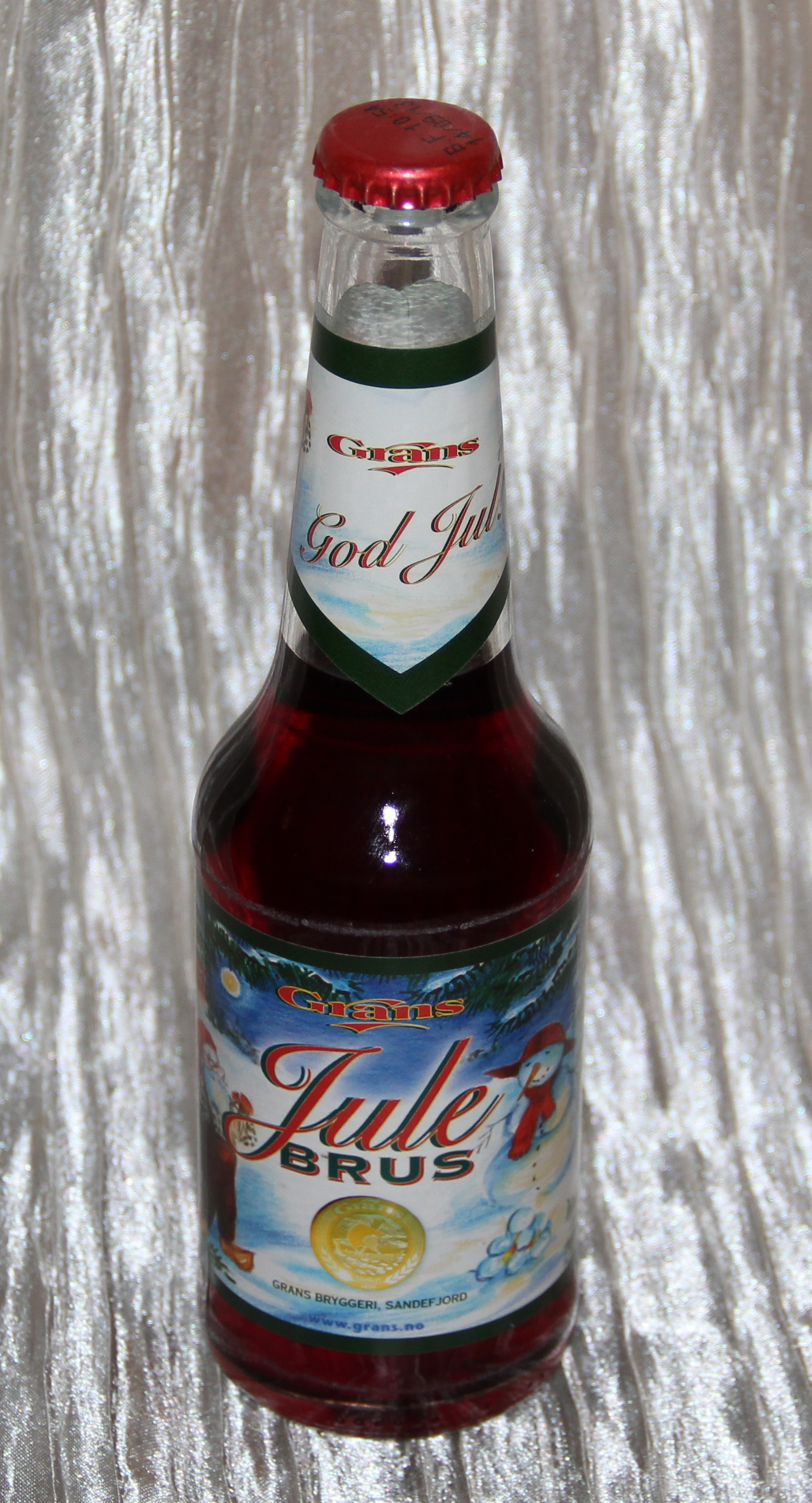
Bottle of red Grans julebrus.

Julebrus or jolebrus (lit. 'Christmas soda' in Norwegian) is a Norwegian soft drink brewed by most Norwegian breweries as a Christmas drink for minors, instead of the traditional juleøl (English: Christmas ale); it is not restricted to minors though, as it is very popular for all ages.

Julebrus is a yearly tradition for many Norwegians; it is very common to see families drinking julebrus at the dinner table around Christmas time.

Julebrus comes in red or golden brown colors – and occasionally others such as green or pink – depending on brewery and brand. Red julebrus is raspberry or redcurrant-flavored, while the golden brown color is champagne cola-flavored.

It is sold beginning October 14th each year and lasts until january.

Julebrus sales start in October, and amount to around 6,5% of all soda sales in Norway in that month. When it gets closer to Christmas, julebrus sales sometimes reach 30% of all soda sales in Norway.

Hamar og Lillehammer julebrus is the country's most popular brand, with seven million liters produced each year. This counts for about one third of the total julebrus production, which lies at around 21 million litres per year.

== See also ==
- Julmust
- List of brand name soft drink products
- List of soft drink flavors
