= Socată =

Romanian soft drink

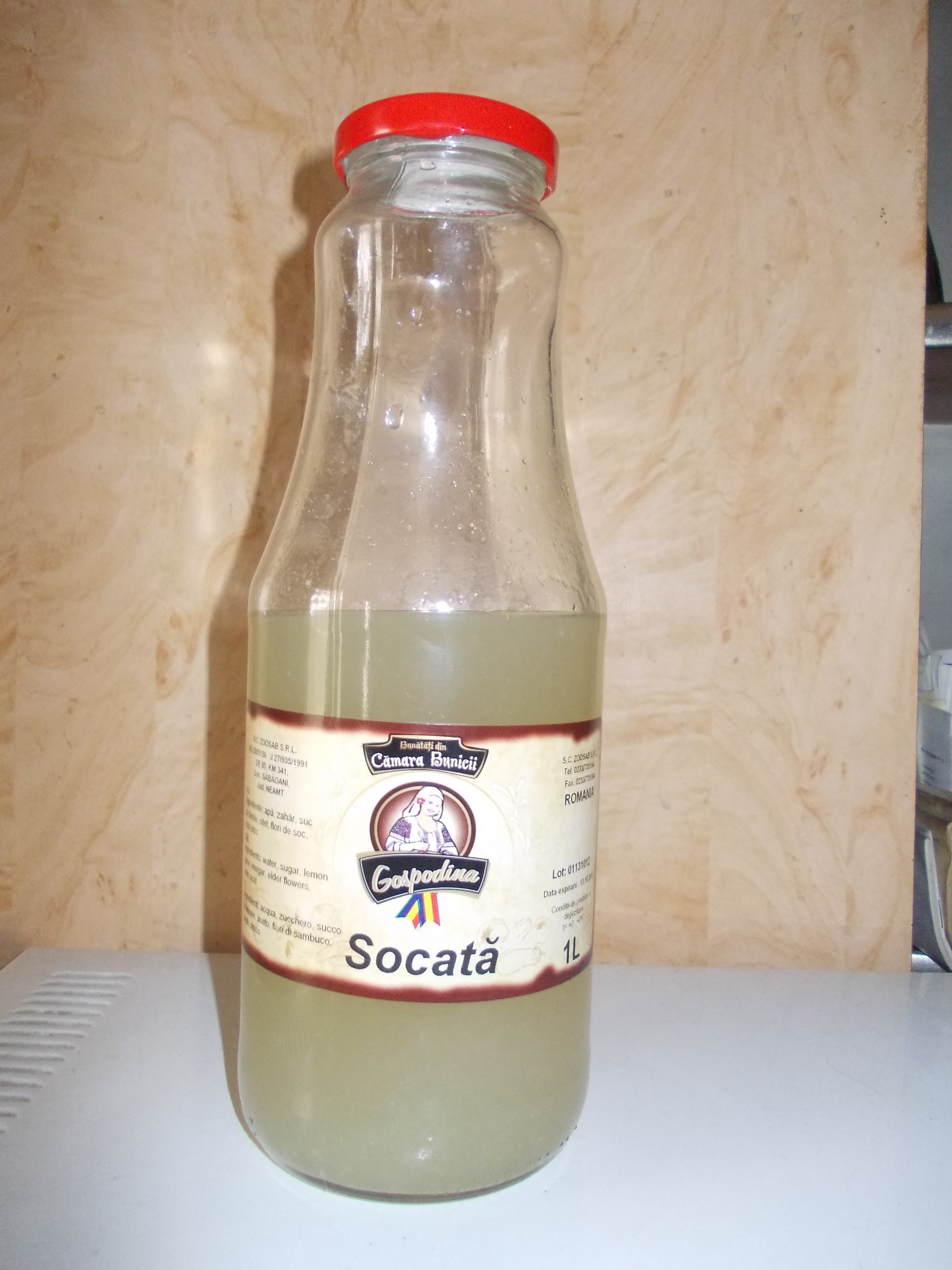
Socată

Socată or suc de soc is a traditional Romanian soft drink made from the flowers of the European elder (or elderberry) shrub, Sambucus nigra (soc in Romanian). It may be non-alcoholic or, usually, low-alcoholic, and can be carbonated or non-carbonated, depending on the fermentation type and duration. It is produced by the natural fermentation of elder flowers in a lemon and sugar or (traditionally) honey solution. Raisins, lemon or lime slices and various spices (mint, lemon or orange zest, basil leaves) may be added. Some newer variations substitute raisins or dates for sugar or honey, and limes instead of lemons as well as additional spices such as saffron or ginger may be used. Yeast and/or rice grains can be added to intensify alcoholic fermentation, if desired. Socată is popular throughout Southeast Europe, where it is also known as fermentirana zova (in Bosnia and Herzegovina, Serbia and Montenegro and gemišt od bazge in Croatia and Slovenia).

Socata can be prepared early summer using freshly cut flowers, or throughout the year, from dried flowers. The elder flowers, water and lemon mix may be steeped for a day, then the other ingredients are added. Primary fermentation takes 2-4 days in a covered but not airtight recipient. After this stage, the drink is filtered, transferred in smaller bottles, refrigerated and consumed usually within 1-2 days as a very low alcohol or non-alcoholic soft drink. Often, home-made Socata is prepared in 10 L batches to be consumed right after primary fermentation, with family or friends, for holidays, weekends or casual events such as birthdays or barbecues.

If left for longer in bottles, the secondary fermentation will increase the alcohol and carbon dioxide levels to levels comparable to those found in beer. In this case, the drink might become too carbonated if the bottles are completely closed (airtight).

In traditional Romanian medicine, elder flowers are thought to have detoxifying, diuretic, expectorant, immunostimulant and anti-infectious properties and were used as infusion to help treatment of respiratory and urinary disorders. The European elderberry (sometimes called common elder) also grows spontaneously in North America.

In Sweden, Switzerland, Romania, Albania, Serbia, Montenegro, Bosnia & Herzegovina, Croatia, North Macedonia, Ukraine, Poland, India, Cyprus, Czech Republic, Slovakia, Iceland, Lithuania, Latvia, Estonia, Russia, and some other countries, there is "Fanta Shokata" based on the Socată.

== See also ==
- Elderflower cordial
- List of brand name soft drinks products
- List of soft drink flavors
