= Cherikee Red =

Brand of cherry-flavored soft drink

- Type: Soft drink
- Manufacturer: The American Bottling Company
- Origin: United States
- Introduced: 1969; 57 years ago
- Discontinued: 2020; 6 years ago
- Color: Red
- Flavor: Cherry
- Related products: Faygo Red Pop; Cheerwine; Barq's Red Creme Soda

Cherikee Red is a brand of cherry-flavored soft drink. Its name is a play on the name of the Cherokee Indian Tribe.

The Cherikee Red brand debuted in 1969 as a product of Cotton Club Bottling and Canning Company in Cleveland, Ohio. The product was initially bottled by Cotton Club, the A.J. Canfield Company in Chicago, the Crystal Soda Water Company of Scranton, Pennsylvania, and Will G Keck Corporation's Laurel Springs Beverage division in Kecksburg, Pennsylvania. In the late 1980s and early 1990s, the Cherikee Red brand was distributed by D & M Management, Inc. (Davidsville, PA), an independent beverage distribution firm, in the West Central Pennsylvania, Maryland, Washington, D.C. and the Northern Virginia areas.

As of 2010, the brand is owned by the American Bottling Company of Plano, Texas, a subsidiary of Dr Pepper Snapple Group. However, as of 2020, due to the Keurig Dr Pepper formation, production of this brand ceased.
