= Red Pop =

Soft drink flavor

Faygo Red Pop

Red Pop or strawberry pop is a soft drink flavor.

== History ==
Faygo introduced strawberry pop in its 1907 initial line up. In 1970, the name of the strawberry pop was officially changed to Red Pop. This is Faygo's top seller.
