= Beer in the Caribbean =

The beers of the Caribbean are unique to each island in the region, although many are variants of the same style. Each island generally brews its own unique pale lager, the occasional stout, and often a non-alcoholic malta beverage. Contract-brewing of international beers is also common, with Heineken Pilsener and Guinness Foreign Extra Stout being the most popular. The beers vary between the islands to suit the taste and the brewing method used.

== Antigua and Barbuda ==
The national beer of Antigua is Wadadli beer, an alternative name for the island itself. It is now brewed by the St Vincent Brewery. It was previously brewed by Antigua Brewery, which also brewed international beer and soft drinks under license.

== Aruba ==
Aruba is home to Brouwerij Nacional Balashi. The brewery produces a line-up of four distinctive beers, each inspired and influenced in one way or another by Aruba's heritage and way of life. Balashi the flagship brand is an all-malt pilsner with a 5% ABV. First brewed in 1999, Balashi has won two awards from the Monde Selection in Brussels, the gold medal in 2001 as well as the Grand Gold in 2004. Chill is a pale lager with a 5% ABV and is gluten free. First brewed in 2011, Chill is a popular beer on the island because of its easy drinkability. And finally, HopiBon a premium lager with a 5% ABV made exclusively with premium hops from Germany and HopiStout a Caribbean Style Stout with a 7.4% ABV.

== Bahamas ==
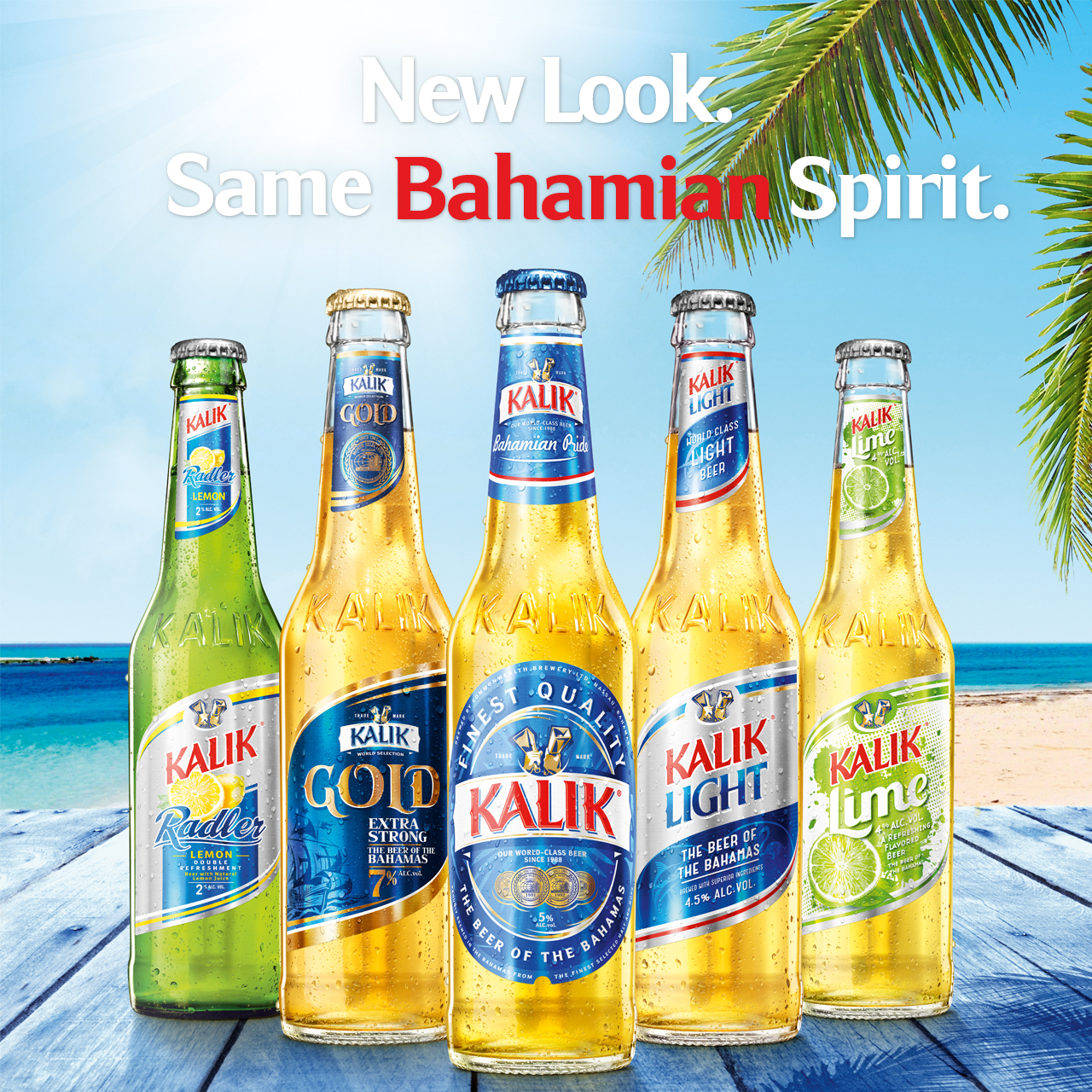
Kalik beers

Kalik beer, a golden lager, is the national beer of The Bahamas, controlling over 50% of the beer market in the country. Winner of three consecutive Gold Medals from Monde Selection, it is also stronger than most Caribbean lagers, at 7%ABV. Its brewer, Commonwealth Brewing Ltd, also brews Kalik Light and Kalik Regular, two lagers lighter than the original. In 2007 Sands Beer based out of Freeport, Grand Bahama entered the market with its signature Lager "Sands" it also launched beers called High Rock named after a town in Eastern Grand Bahama, and a dark stout called Strong Back.

== Barbados ==
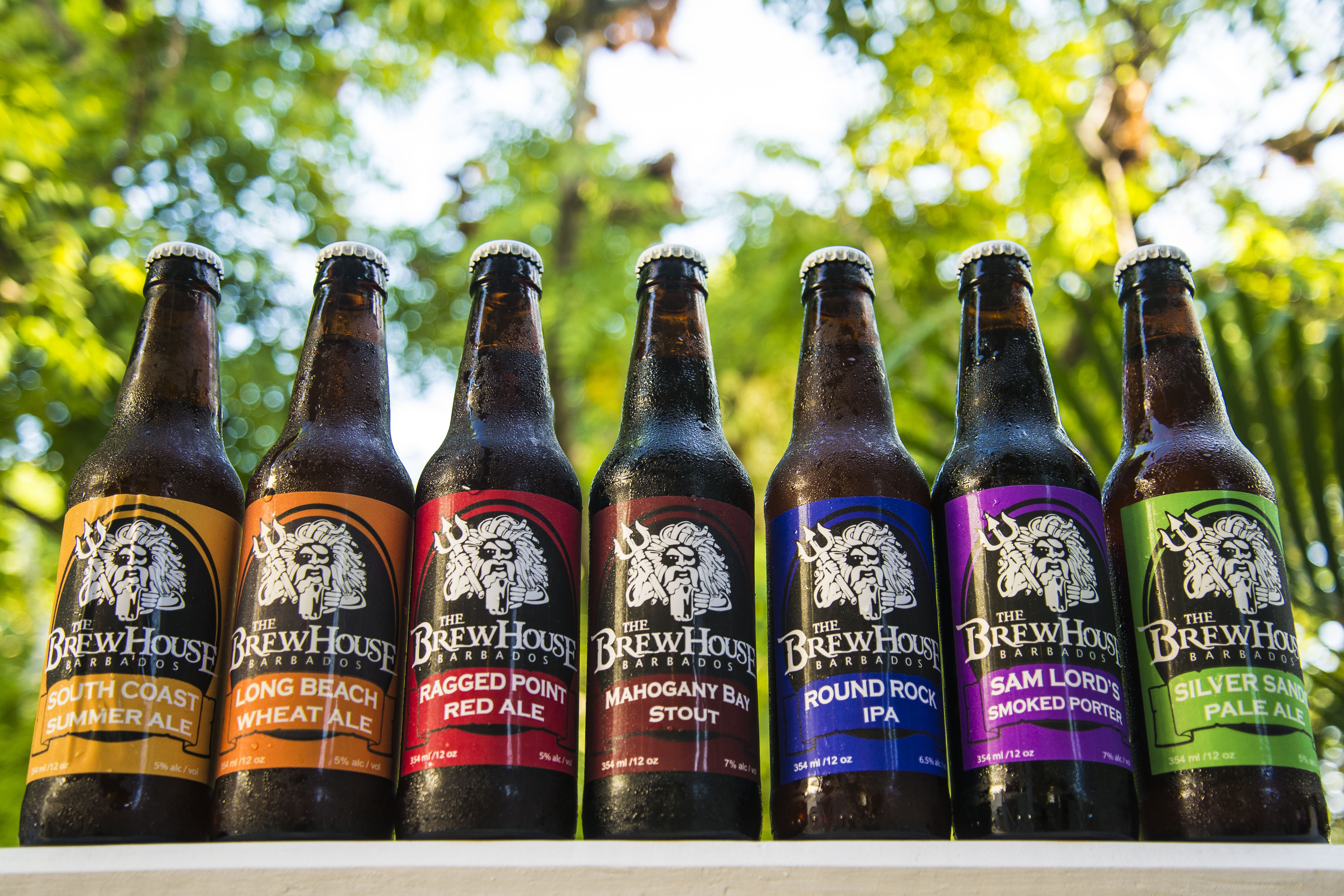
Beers from Barbados

Barbados is home to the Banks Barbados Brewery, which brews Banks Beer, a pale lager, as well as Banks Amber Ale. Banks also brews Tiger Malt, a non-alcoholic malted beverage.

There is a separate Banks beer company in Guyana, Banks DIH, and the two breweries merged in 2005 with the intention to market their beer internationally.

10 Saints beer is brewed in Speightstown, St. Peter in Barbados and aged for 90 days in Mount Gay 'Special Reserve' Rum casks. It was first brewed in 2009 and is available in certain Caricom nations.

In 2014, a microbrewery called The Brew House was founded in Christ Church.

== Cayman Islands ==
Grand Cayman - Following a $10m investment programme, The Cayman Islands Brewery was launched in 2007.

== Cuba ==
There are four major brands found in Cuba and sold mainly on resorts and tourists:

- Cristal
- Bucanero - joint venture with Labatts
- Mayabe
- Hatuey

Tinima and Bruja are local brands consumed by locals.

== Dominica ==
The national beer of Dominica is Kubuli, an amber-colored lager which won the Monde Selection Gold Medal in 2002.

== Dominican Republic ==
Presidente beer logo

Brands represented in the Dominican Republic include Presidente, Presidente Black and Presidente Light, Bohemia Especial, La Benedicta, The One and Quisqueya.

== Grenada ==
The West Indies Beer Company is a craft brewery located in L'Anse Aux Epines that was founded in September 2014.

== Haiti ==
Prestige is the name for a brand of American-style lager produced by Brasserie Nationale d'Haïti in Port-au-Prince, Haiti. It is the best-selling beer in Haiti, claiming a 98% market share. Prestige beer is also available in some parts of the United States.

Prestige beer was launched in 1976, less than 2 years after BRANA's creation. In 2000 and again in 2012, it won the gold medal at the World Beer Cup for American-style lager.

== Jamaica ==
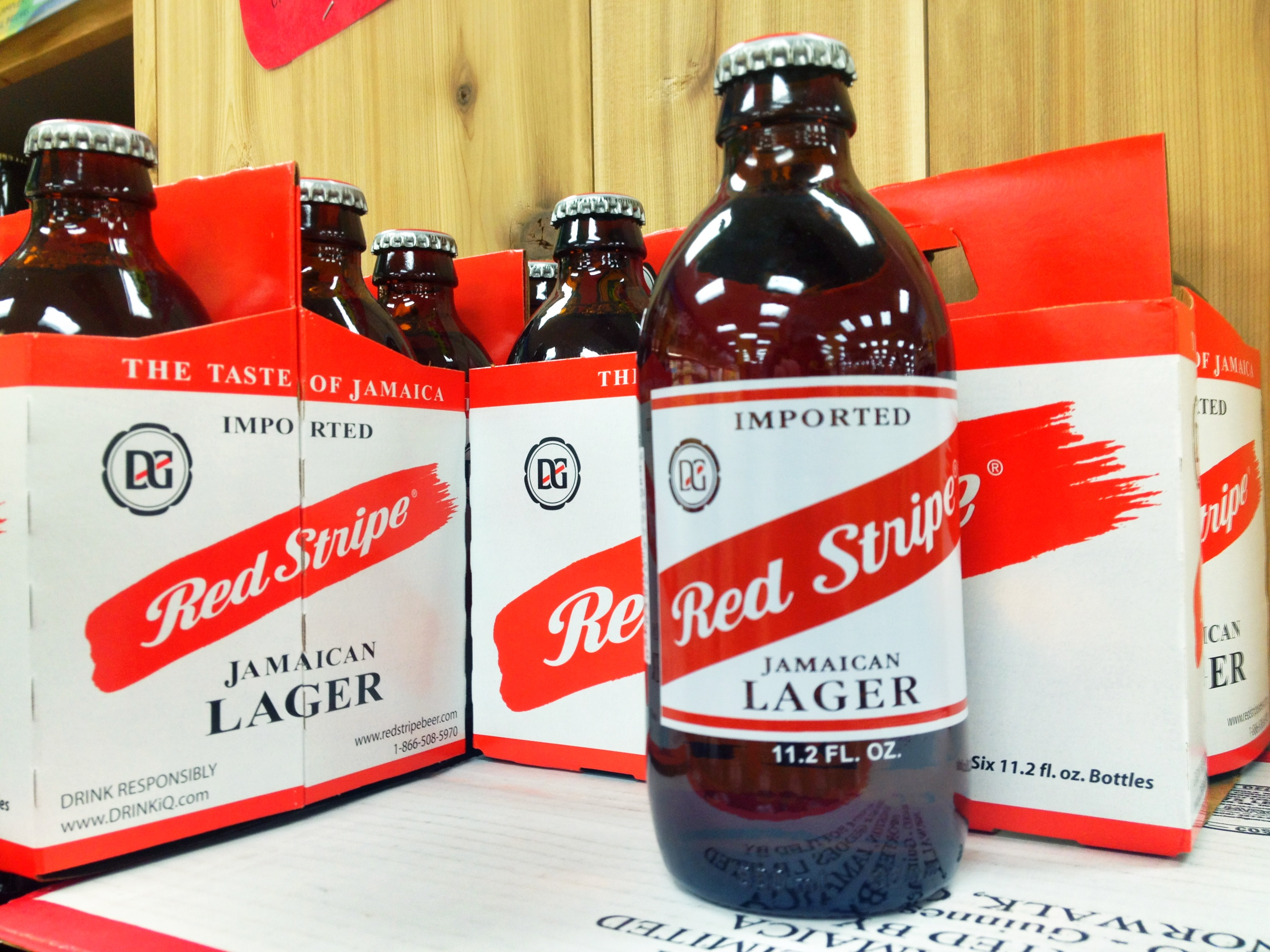
Red Stripe is a Jamaican brand, first produced in 1928.

Red Stripe is an internationally popular Jamaican beer produced by Desnoes & Geddes. It is a pale lager. The company also produces Red Stripe Light, Dragon Stout and Malta, a non-alcoholic beverage.

Kingston 62, alternately Kingston Beer is a pale lager also sold on the island.

Trouble's Brewing is a small craft brewery that first emerged in 2019 to carve out their own market niche in Jamaica. As of September 2021, Trouble's Brewing offers five beer styles (Blonde Ale, IPA, Hefeweizen, Stout, and Pale Ale), and one to two seasonal beers including their Oktoberfest (Märzen). Trouble's Brewing is owned by Craft Beer Company of Jamaica Ltd., which is listed as a private company with a sole shareholder.

== Puerto Rico ==
Old Harbor Brewery, which had been a staple of Old San Juan, closed its doors in December, 2015. They re-emerged in 2018 with a new look and a brand new production facility in Carolina which includes a large tasting room.

REBL Brewery (Radical Experimental Brewing Lab) is a nano brewery located in Utuado. Their Kasiri IPA is brewed with cassava.

Boquerón Brewing Company, from Cabo Rojo, produces several beer styles, the most popular being Boquerón Pale Ale, Boquerón Blonde Ale and Crash Boat IPA. They also make Gas Chambers, which is an IPA series that varies seasonally, Domes Caribbean Style IPA, Caja de Muerto Summer Ale and 3 Palmas Milk Stout.

FOK (Fresh off the Keg) Brewing Company operates in the town of Caguas. They currently have 3 main products: FOK Red Ale, which is an Irish Red Ale, a Golden Ale named FOK Blond Ale, and FOK Coffee-Black IPA. In all, FOK has produced at least 14 beers since their introduction on the island.

Ingeniero Microbrewery is located in Manatí and produces 5 beer brands: Porter Rican, Son of a Glitch, Mother Hopper, Tamarindia Amber Ale and Conuco. Porter Rican is an English-style Robust Porter, which is conditioned with Puerto Rican cocoa nibs and vanilla beans. Son of a Glitch is a Pale Ale that has citrus and floral notes. These two are available throughout the year. Mother Hopper is an Imperial/Double IPA made with 7 hop varieties while Tamarindia Amber Ale is an Irish-style Red Ale infused with local tamarind. Conuco is their seasonal beer that changes annually, the first version being a Spiced Yam Beer that employed Sweet Potatoes, star anise and cinnamon.

Barlovento Brewing Company, formerly located in Manatí, produced the Galeón craft beer series. It included Galeón IPA, which combines English ale brewing techniques with American hop blends and Galeón 90/-, which is a Scottish-styled ale matured in rum soaked oak chips and honey. The brewery was sold and went on to become Ocean Lab Brewing Co. in Carolina, Puerto Rico

The Aviator's Brewery is a nano brewery operating out of San Lorenzo. Their flagship beer is called Gallo Negro red ale.

Dragon Stone Abbey in Río Grande produces Saphira, Drakko and Black Diamond. Saphira is a Saison with tart notes while Drakko is an American Style session IPA. Black Diamond is a full-bodied Belgian Style Porter with chocolate aroma and flavors of coffee, chocolate, stone fruit and some wood.

Bros Brewing Company was a contract-brewery operating out of at Ingeniero Microbrewery and is currently on hiatus. They initially produced the "Discovery Series", featuring the names of the vessels employed by Christopher Columbus during the discovery of Puerto Rico: "La Niña Wheat Ale", "La Pinta" and "La Santa María-Belgian Tripel".

Boxlab Brewing Company is a nano brewery and tap room from Aguadilla, Puerto Rico. Annual production is 300 BBL (barrels). Their beers include Mal de ojo IPA, Semifusa Brut IPA and Cocotero Toasted Coconut Milk Stout. The owners also operate west coast craft beer landmark The Beer Box, a small bar and eatery also located in Aguadilla.

Ocean Lab Brewing Co. operates a large production facility, tap room and events venue in Carolina. It is one of the largest craft breweries in Puerto Rico.

ZURC Bräuhaus is a nano brewery operating out of Coamo, Puerto Rico. They brew mostly in the German tradition, but will also release American styles. They are the first brewery to release a sour beer (a Berliner Weisse kettle sour) in Puerto Rico commercially.

Señorial Brewing Corp. is a nano brewery operating out of the town of Ponce. Their beers make reference to places, people and historical events around the city, most notably: La Ceiba IPA (named after the centuries-old landmark tree) and El Polvorín Smoked Porter (a tribute to the heroes of the El Polvorín fires of 1899).

Sothego Corp. was a nano brewery which produced the Dacay Cerveza Artesanal line of beers in Guaynabo. The product line included Dacay Red Ale, Dacay Golden Ale, Dacay Black IPA and Sofía IPA. They also produced Jíbaro Ale, which was a beer made with ginger and lemon peel and Dacay Oatmeal Stout, both available seasonally. The Brewery has since closed.

Medalla Light and Silver Key are commercial light lager beers produced by Compañía Cervecera de Puerto Rico. The first beer won first prize in 2005 for light beer in Brussels awarded by Monde Selection. Currently, it is the top selling beer in Puerto Rico. In addition, they launched Magna on August 1, 2011.

A few local bars have started to produce their own house beers by contract through established breweries. In Ponce, small bar Birriola has produced a Blonde Ale through Señorial Brewing, and in San Juan, El Tap has established Saint-Turce Beer Co. and released Tras Talleres, a Double IPA.

Several more microbreweries are in the process of attaining permits, while others have closed their doors. New microbreweries include Pura Vida Brewery in Cabo Rojo, Cold Blood Brewery in Quebradillas, Rincón Beer Company in Rincón, Reina Mora Brewing Co. in Sabana Grande and Cervecería del Callejón in San Juan. Although from unknown locations in Puerto Rico, other microbreweries in the process of getting their permits are Amalgama Brewing, Gafas Locas Beer Co. and Cervezas Cielo Roto.

== Saint Lucia ==
Piton is a Pilsner beer brand from the island of Saint Lucia, brewed by Windward & Leeward Brewing Limited, which is owned by Heineken.

Antillia Brewing Company is the island's award-winning craft brewery. It brews traditional ales and stouts and a lineup of locally inspired beers using passion fruit, local citrus, aging on rum barrels and even the fabled Bois Bandee. Distributed island wide in draught form Antillia bottles are also found at local grocery and wine shops and are often sold by large resort clients. The brewery is located in Odsan and they operate a beer garden at Duty Free Pointe Seraphine, the cruise terminal in the capital of Castries.

== Trinidad and Tobago ==
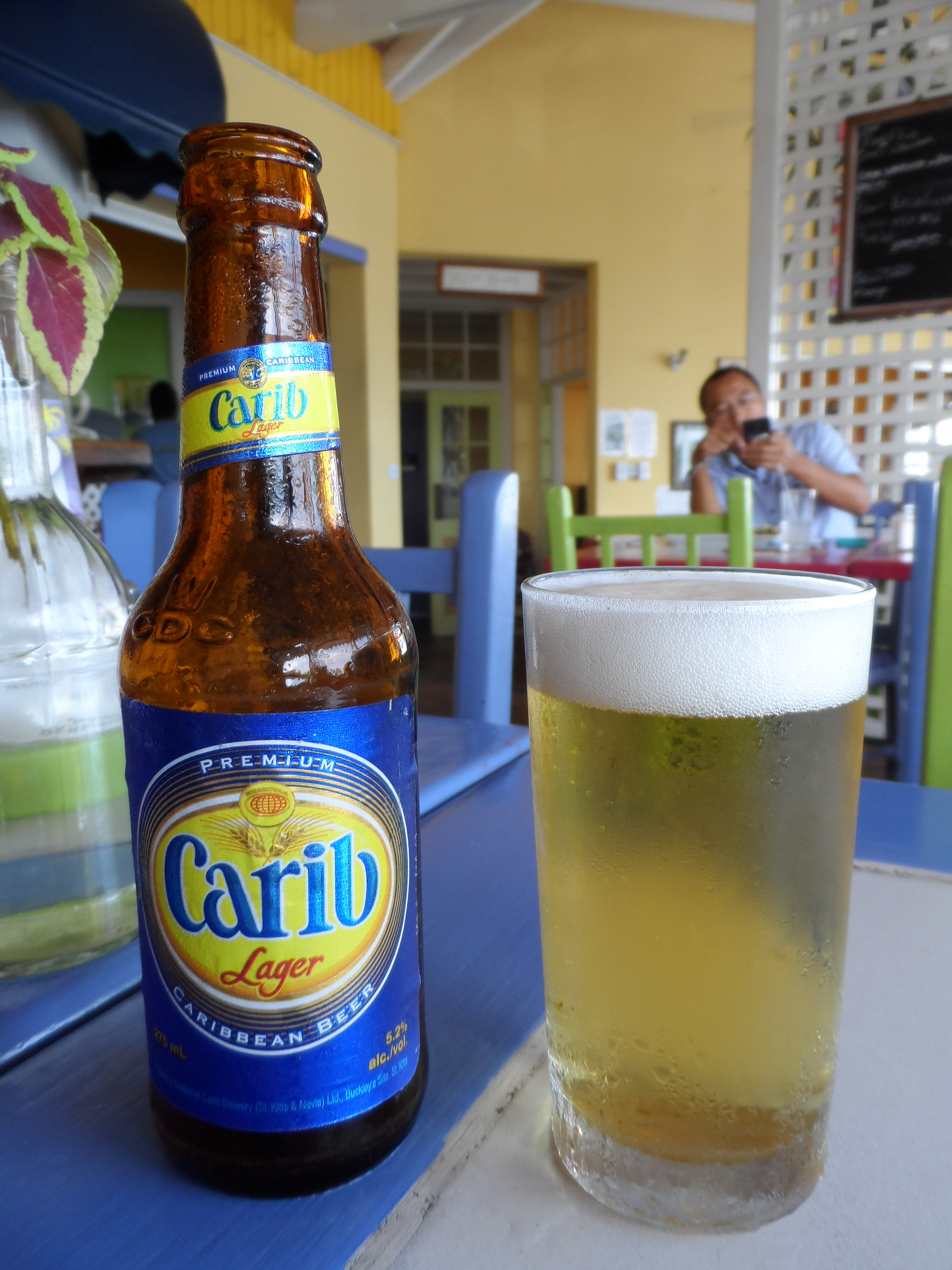
Carib Lager

Carib Brewery manufactures Carib Beer and Stag Lager, along with Malta Carib, and Shandy Carib.

There is a new micro brewery in P.O.S, Tommy's Brewing Company. In 2019 Tommy's Brewing Company won two Double Gold Medals at the 2019 European Beer Challenge in London.

== St. Vincent and the Grenadines ==
32 Islands Brewery in Mustique makes three craft beers. Mustique Gold; a golden pale ale. Mustique Blues; created in homage to the Mustique Blues Festival and Mustique WIPA; A West Indian Pale Ale.

St. Vincent Brewery, Ltd. brews Hairoun beer, an alternative name for the island. Hairoun is a golden lager brewed with barley, hops, and spring water. St. Vincent Brewery also bottles Guinness Foreign Extra Stout under license as well as Vita Malt, a non-alcoholic malt beverage, and several other non-alcoholic beverages.

== United States Virgin Islands ==
The United States Virgin Islands had three breweries as of 2012.

== List of beers and breweries ==
- Banks Barbados Brewery
- Belikin
- Brasserie Nationale d'Haïti
  - Prestige
- Carib Brewery
- Cervecería Nacional Dominicana
  - Presidente
- Compañía Cervecera de Puerto Rico
- Desnoes & Geddes
  - Dragon Stout
  - Red Stripe
- Kalik
- Kingston 62
- Piton

== See also ==
- Beer and breweries by region
