= Vitamalz =

German alcohol-free malt beer

Vitamalz ['viːtamalts] is a German malt beer without alcohol.

== Miscellaneous ==
Vitamalz comes in brown 0.33l or 0.5l bottles. The logo shows six circles in decreasing size with a color gradient going from dark blue to red to white, featured on a yellow background. The beer itself is of dark brown color. It almost looks like cola, though it develops a light brown foam.

Due to the German beer purity law or Deutsches Reinheitsgebot, first established in 1516 Vitamalz cannot be sold in Germany as beer. It must be called malt drink (in German: Malztrunk). The colloquial name is Dunkelbier (dark beer) or Kinderbier (children's beer) in some areas of Germany and Austria.

== Ingredients ==
Vitamalz contains water, barley malt, glucose syrup, carbonic acid, food coloring E150c and hops. It does not contain alcohol. According to the bottle, it should be consumed within one year of purchase. The website claims it has about as many calories as an orange juice; in fact, at 43 kcal per 100 ml, it is about on par with both alcoholic lager and most soft drinks with added sugar. The company recommends it for young people and pregnant women because of its nutritional value. Unfortunately, no information on said value can be found, other than the fact that it contains several B-Vitamins, which support the metabolism.

== Taste ==
Due to its containing brewing water, barley malt and hop, the taste of malt beer is related to that of alcohol-free lager; however it is notably sweeter, dominated by the glucose syrup which is extracted from, and adds a flavour of, sugar beets.

== History ==
After the scientist Fritz Lux from Weihenstephan managed to retrieve vitamin B_{1} from yeast cells in 1920, Ferdinand Glaab had the idea for a new kind of beer: Malt Beer. It was not until 1931 however until it was actually produced, when the Seligenstadt brewery Glaabsbräu purchased the patented recipe from the Vitalux company. The new beer was called "Vitamalz". In 1966, the brand "Vitamalz" was patented. Since 1970, when the licenser Glaabsbräu F. Glaab & Co. founded together with other breweries the Vitamalz Group, whereas each member works with the same recipe, 13 breweries have joined the production of Vitamalz. Vitamalz has been the leader on the German malt beer market since 1980, with hardly any commercials running for it. In 2000, Vitamalz started a campaign with a German offering Vitamalz to various Americans, who responded "Ah, Cola!", whereas he replied "Nichts Cola, Vitamalz!". In those spots, they were all pleasantly surprised by the taste. They stopped airing after running for about a year. Vitamalz has been sponsoring the "Vitamalz Cup" (a women's bicycle tournament, which has evolved into the German National Championship), and a basketball competition called "Monsterdunks".

== See also ==
- Malta (soft drink)
