= José Blanco =

José Blanco may refer to:

- José Blanco López (born 1962), Spanish politician
- Richard José Blanco (born 1982), Venezuelan footballer
- Juan José Blanco (born 1985), Uruguayan footballer
- José Blanco (cigar industrialist) (born 1949), Dominican-Nicaraguan cigar industrialist
- José Luis Blanco (born 1975), Spanish athlete
- José Iborra Blanco (1908–2002), Spanish footballer
