= Malt granules =

Malt granules are granules produced from malt, via a dried liquid wort, which can then be used for in production of beverages and food products. Malt granules are dissolved in water before use, and have a range of different applications, especially in beverage production.

== Production ==
The first step in malt granule production is to produce a wort in a brewery. This wort is then dried (using a process such as the fluid bed technique, yielding the wort in a dried, granular form). Dissolving these granules will reproduce the original wort, retaining aroma compounds. This reconstituted wort can then be used in further brewing processes.

== Applications ==
Malt granules can be used in fermentation plants in the brewing or distilling industry, as well as for soft drink manufacture. In particular, malt granules can be used in the same applications as its as described in detail at the malt article, in particular in beverages, including in malted milk), malt beverages with different flavors (e.g. Malta), energy drinks made with malt-sugar, and non-alcoholic beer.

== Advantages ==
The advantage for said method for the production of granulates is that no loss of quality in the wort occurs during suitable temperature changes during the drying. The granulate can thus be coated with one or several further coatings, in particular with further flavorings. Above all flavorings can be encapsulated within the dried wort, such that the above is not lost on storage and possible transport.
