= José Blanco (cigar industrialist) =

Nicaraguan businessman (born 1949)

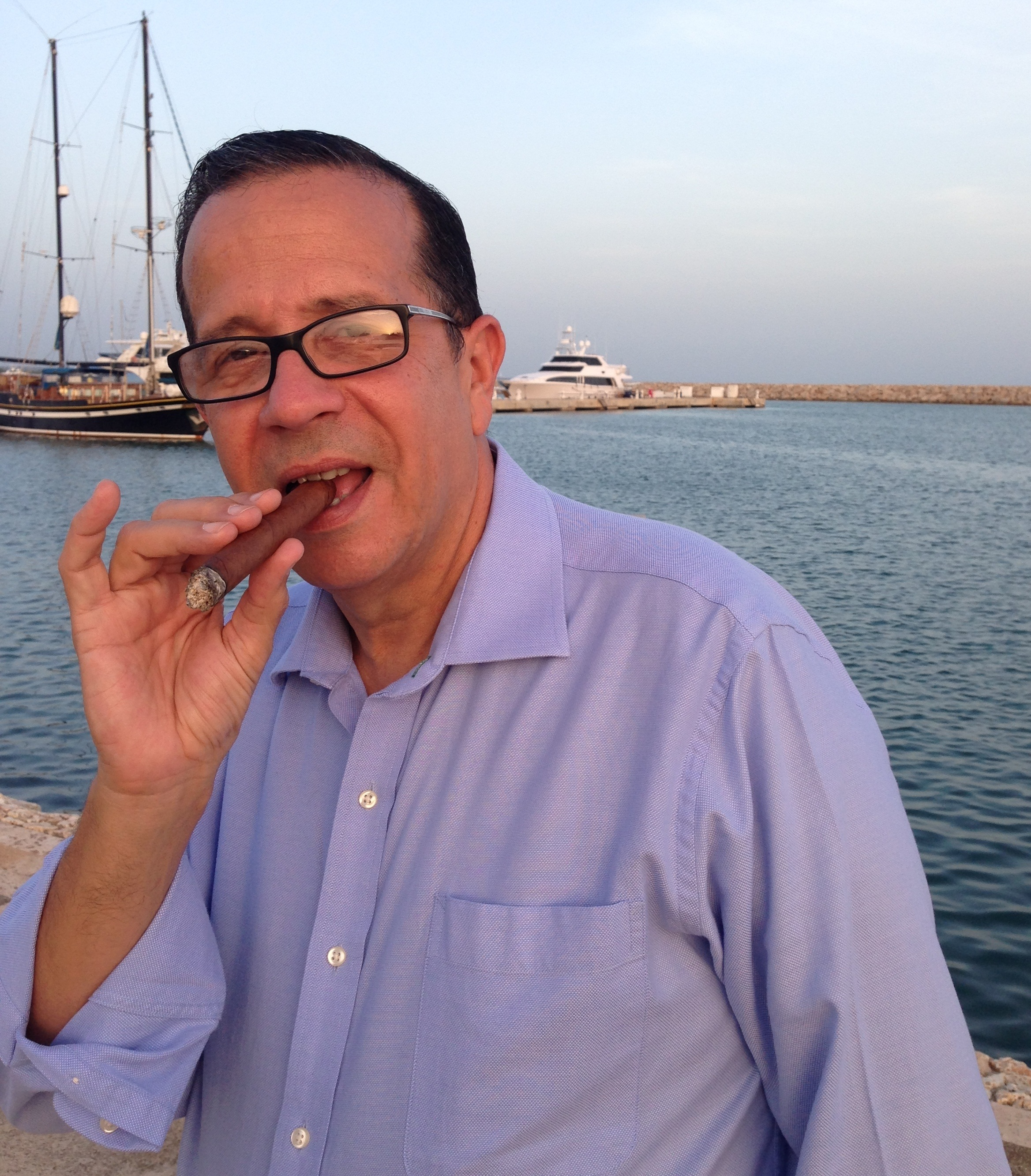
- Photo courtesy Emma Viktorsson
- Born: October 27, 1949 (age 77)
- Occupation: Master Blender/ Cigar Educator
- Spouse: Emma Viktorsson
- Children: 4

José Blanco (born October 27, 1949) is the former Senior Vice President of the oldest Nicaraguan cigar company, Joya de Nicaragua S.A., in Estelí, Nicaragua, and the former Sales Director of La Aurora, the oldest Dominican cigar company in Santiago, Dominican Republic.

== Early life ==
José Blanco was born on October 27, 1949, to Dominican parents in political exile from the dictatorial regime of General Rafael Trujillo. The family returned to the Dominican Republic in 1961 following Trujillo's assassination. Back in the Dominican Republic, his father started growing tobacco. His uncle owned a cigar factory as well as a farm, so he and his cousin, Jochi, spent summers there learning to ferment, age and sort tobacco. His love affair with the finished product began at age 15, when he smoked his first cigar from his uncle's factory.

== Family ==
He is married to Emma Viktorsson, the daughter of the retired Director for Eastern Europe for Swedish Match, Ake Viktorsson. They have a young son, Jasper, born in 2012. José also has three adult children from a previous marriage; Euler, Lourdes and Gregory.

His cousin - also christened José but known as “Jochy” - Blanco is a tobacco grower and the owner and president of Tabacalera La Palma in Tamboril, Dominican Republic.

== Career ==
In 1974, he began his sales career as a salesman for a Dominican rum maker. In 1980, he joined Grupo León Jimenes (now Empresa León Jimenes) to sell Presidente beer and Marlboro cigarettes. He worked his way up the corporate ladder to Supervisor (1985), Sales Coordinator (1990), Manager of Promotions and Public Relations (1992) and, finally, Sales Manager for Beer and Cigarettes for the Northeast Dominican Republic (1995). Even though his primary duties did not involve cigars, he was asked to become an unofficial member of the company's cigar taste testing panel by Guillermo Léon when the latter took over the cigar division, La Aurora.

=== Cigars: La Aurora ===
In 1999, he was finally able to join the La Aurora cigar division as their Sales Manager. To this point, his cigar consumption consisted mainly of cigars made from Dominican filler with Cameroon or Connecticut wrappers, along with the occasional Cuban cigar. Once he started visiting cigar retailers in his new position, he began to discover tobaccos from other countries, such as Honduras, Nicaragua, and Ecuador. He developed a passion for blending – “I don't care how good a cigar is, if it's good and it's one-dimensional, to me it's just a good, boring smoke. I like cigars that are complex and change a lot.”

He began to work on blends for La Aurora. His first major success as a blender came with the 100 Años, created to celebrate La Aurora's 100th anniversary in 2003. The 100 Años won La Aurora some unaccustomed accolades – in Cigar Aficionado magazine's annual ranking of the top 25 cigars of the year, the 100 Años Belicoso was ranked 2nd. He followed this success with the 1495 Series, the 107, and the Barrel Aged blends.

After 31 years with Empresa León Jimenes and La Aurora, Blanco retired from the company on 15 June 2011.

=== Cigars: Joya de Nicaragua ===
His retirement was short-lived, however, as in September 2011 he accepted an invitation to become Senior Vice President of Joya de Nicaragua S.A. from its owner, Dr. Alejandro Martinez Cuenca. His duties consisted of Blend and Brand Development, and he reported directly to Dr. Cuenca.

The first blend to emerge from this new association, released in August 2012, was called Cuenca y Blanco. The cigar was well received, but the name was troublesome, as there were already trademarked, established cigar brands called “Cuenca” and “Blanco.” The name was eventually shortened to CyB in October.

The cigar appeared on many “Best of 2012” lists throughout the industry. On halfwheel.com, which posts a consensus of 53 different such lists, the CyB was Cigar of the Year: “The cigar formerly known as Cuenca y Blanco appeared on 25 of the 53 lists, the next closest cigar by that measure…appeared on only 17. But the numbers for total score weren’t even close, the eponymous release…had a lead over the second place (cigar) that was roughly seven times what (the winner) had over its second place rival when it won the award last year.”

=== Cigars: EPC Cigars ===
In 2016, Jose Blanco was hired as senior vice president of EPC Cigars in the Dominican Republic. He worked closely with industry veteran Ernesto Perez Carrillo. On August 31, 2019, Blanco left EPC Cigars.

=== Cigars: Arturo Fuente ===
Early 2020, Blanco joined Arturo Fuente as Director of Sales, Eastern Hemisphere. In this role, Jose will work closely with and provide support to Arturo Fuente International as it builds and grows the Arturo Fuente brand throughout the world.
