= Desnoes & Geddes =

Jamaican beverage producer

Desnoes & Geddes Limited
- Type: Public (JSE: DG)
- Industry: Beverages
- Founded: 1918
- Headquarters: Kingston, Jamaica
- Key people: Richard Byles (Chairman)
- Products: Beers, lagers, malt beverages
- Revenue: JMD 9.13 billion ($148 million) (2005)
- Number of employees: 750 (2007)
- Website: redstripebeer.com

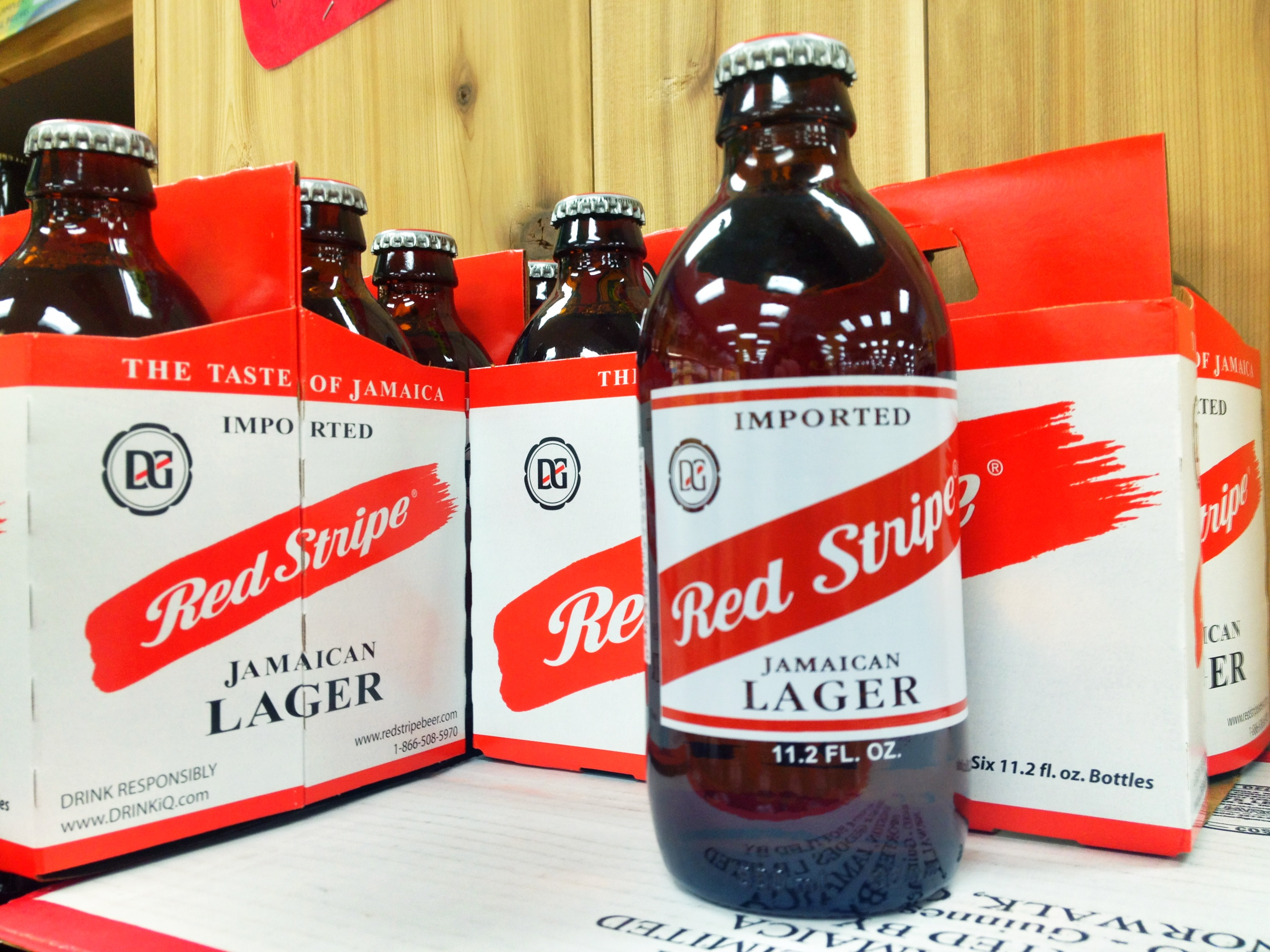

Desnoes and Geddes Limited (D&G) is a Jamaican brewer and beverage producer, best known for Red Stripe lager. It was formed in 1918 by Eugene Peter Desnoes and Thomas Hargreaves Geddes who combined their two shops into one business, originally producing soft drinks and distributing imported alcohol, and later opening the Surrey Brewery in Kingston.

== Products ==
D&G produces one of Jamaica's best-known exports, Red Stripe beer, and also exports Old Jamaica Ginger Beer. It brews other malt beverages for the local market under the brand names Red Stripe Light, Dragon Stout, Malta (nonalcoholic), Smirnoff Ice, Guinness, and Heineken.

=== Dragon Stout ===
Dragon Stout is a stout beer first introduced in 1920 and relaunched in 1961. Its brewing process utilises European, caramel, and roasted malts, and dark brown sugar. It has an ABV of 7.5%. Along with Red Stripe, it was included in the book 1001 Beers You Must Try Before You Die.

== Ownership ==
Only a small portion of D&G's shares are publicly traded. From 1993 until autumn 2015, Guinness and Smirnoff owner Diageo owned a controlling stake in the company. In October 2015, Dutch brewer Heineken acquired Diageo's stake taking its stake to 73.3%. It stated it would launch a full bid for the shares it did not own.

D&G also made soft drinks, including the popular Ting, but sold that division to PepsiCo in 1999. The same year it sold its spirits and wine division to J. Wray and Nephew Ltd.
