= Ting (drink) =

Jamaican carbonated beverage

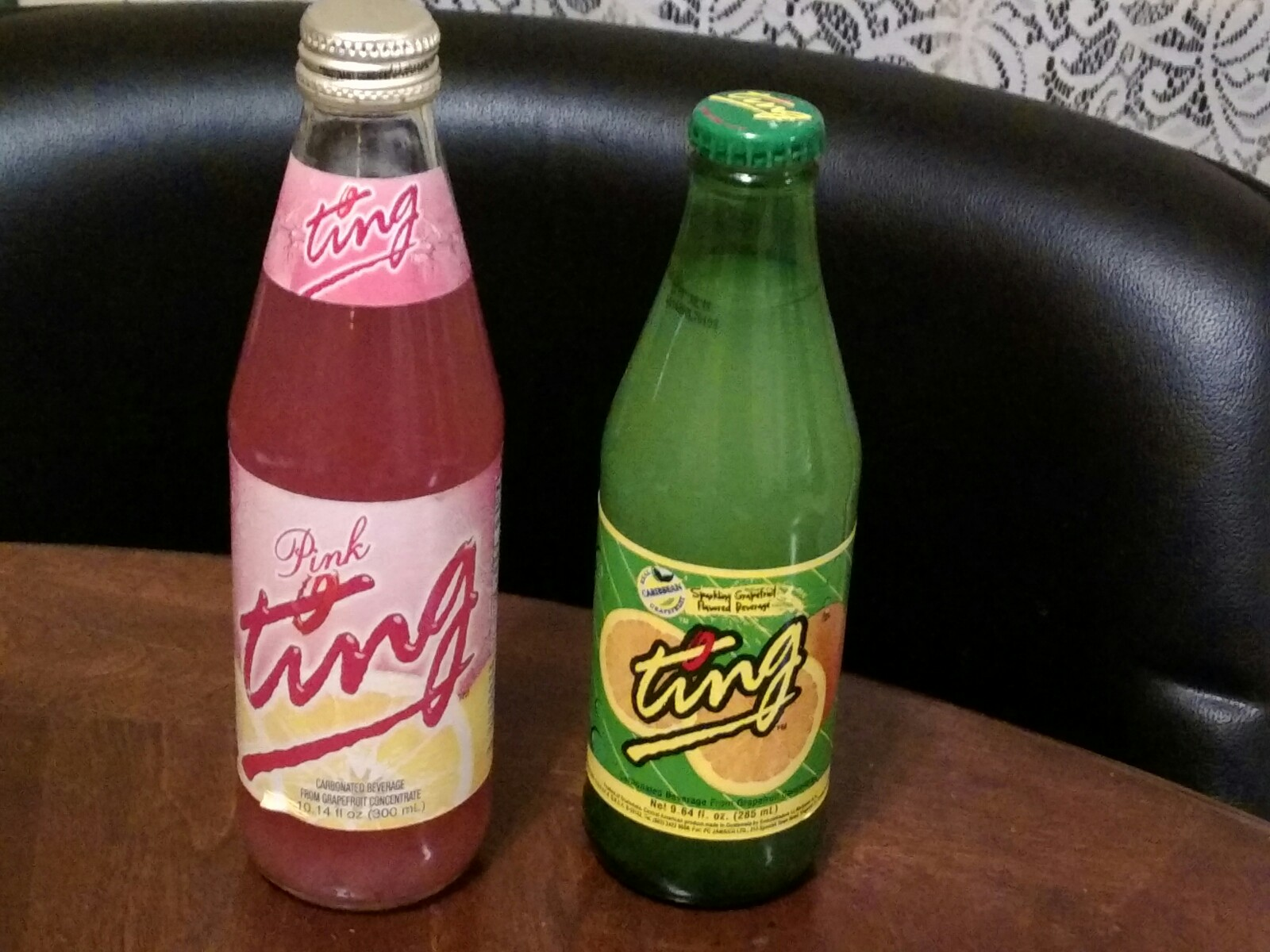
- Ting (green bottle on right) and Pink Ting grapefruit sodas
- Manufacturer: Pepsi-Cola Jamaica Bottling Company
- Distributor: Brooklyn Bottling Group; Cott Beverage Limited (UK)
- Country of origin: Jamaica
- Introduced: November 1976; 48 years ago
- Flavour: grapefruit

Ting is a carbonated beverage popular in the Caribbean. It is flavored with Jamaican grapefruit juice (from concentrate) and is both tart and sweet. Ting comes in a green glass bottle, green plastic bottle or a green and yellow can. Like Orangina, the beverage contains a small amount of sediment consisting of grapefruit juice pulp. Ting is produced in the United Kingdom under license by Refresco Beverages. Ting also now makes Pink Ting Soda, Orange Ting, Diet Ting Soda, and ginger beer.

== History ==
Ting was first produced in 1976 by Desnoes & Geddes Limited. Desnoes & Geddes Limited was acquired by Guinness in 1993 with a 51% share. With Desnoes and Geddes moving to focus on beer alone, its soft drink facility in Jamaica was acquired in 1999 by PepsiCo affiliate Pepsi-Cola Jamaica, located in Kingston, Jamaica. Ting is distributed throughout the Caribbean, the United States, and Canada. Outside these regions it is not commonly available, although it is also produced in the UK using Jamaican grapefruits.

Ting has also been known to be mixed with citrus vodka to create Ving, an alcoholic version of the drink.
