= Brasserie Nationale d'Haïti =

Brewery and bottler in haiti

Brasserie Nationale d'Haiti, S.A.
- Type: Private
- Industry: Beverages
- Founded: 1973
- Founder: Michael Madsen
- Headquarters: Ave Haile Selassie; Port-au-Prince, Haiti,
- Key people: Wietse Mutters (CEO)
- Products: Soft drinks, beer, malta, bottled water
- Revenue: US$ 150 million (2016)
- Owner: Heineken International (95%); Diageo (5%)
- Website: Brana.ht

Brasserie Nationale d'Haïti, S.A. also called BRANA, S.A., is a brewery and bottler in Haiti. The brewery manufactures Prestige beer, an American-style lager produced in the Caribbean.

== History ==
The brewery was founded in 1973 by Michael Madsen, from one of the richest industrial families in Haiti that arrived from Denmark in the late 19th century.

Since its foundation, BRANA has been under license to manage the manufacture and distribution for PepsiCo International, covering such soft drink brand names as Pepsi, 7up, and Teem.

In 1976, it launched Prestige, an American-style lager, the first and to this day the only beer native to Haiti. Later, under license from Heineken International and Diageo, it added to its line of manufactured drinks, Malta Heineken later renamed Malta H, and the famous Guinness Irish stout. It is also the distributor of imported alcoholic beverages for Diageo in Haiti.

At the beginning of the 21st century, BRANA started bottling its own line of soft drinks under the name King Cola along with energy drink TORO. King Cola comes in a variety of flavors such as, banana, strawberry, grape, and cola champagne. The company furthered its product line expansion by adding bottled water to its line of products named Crystal Sources.

On December 14, 2011, Heineken publicly announced it was taking over BRANA by increasing its ownership from 22.5% to 95%
