= Zythum =

Ancient Egyptian beer variety

Zythum (from Latin, based on Ancient Greek: ζῦθος, zŷthos), sometimes also known as zythus or zythos, was a malt beer made in ancient Egypt. The earliest existing records of brewing relate to the production of zythum by ancient Egyptians, c. 2000 BCE.

== Name ==
Zythum comes from a Greek word meaning "ferment". The Latin name is a transcription of the Greek. The Egyptian name for beer was hqt, sometimes written as hemeket.

== Recipe ==
The principal ingredient was malted grain, either emmer wheat or barley or both together. It is often said that yeast was added by lightly baking bread and using crumbled bread to start the fermentation. This, however, is not supported by archaeological finds, which suggest instead that cooked grain and malted grain were combined, producing a mixture that contained sufficient sugar for fermentation.

A very different recipe is mentioned in the third tractate of the Babylonian Talmud (42b). According to Rav Yosef b. Hiyya, it contains 1/3 barley, 1/3 safflower seed and 1/3 salt. Rav Papa substituted wheat for barley. The ingredients were steeped, roasted and ground.

== Medicinal properties ==
Apart from recreational drinking, zythum was used as an ancient Egyptian medicine. It was said to work as both a laxative and antidiarrhoeal. Its use was thought dangerous for sick people and pregnant women.

== Legacy ==
Among Orthodox Jews, it is forbidden during Passover because it contains barley, making it chametz, although the punishment of kareth is not applicable to its consumption.
