= Kalik =

Bahamian brand of beer

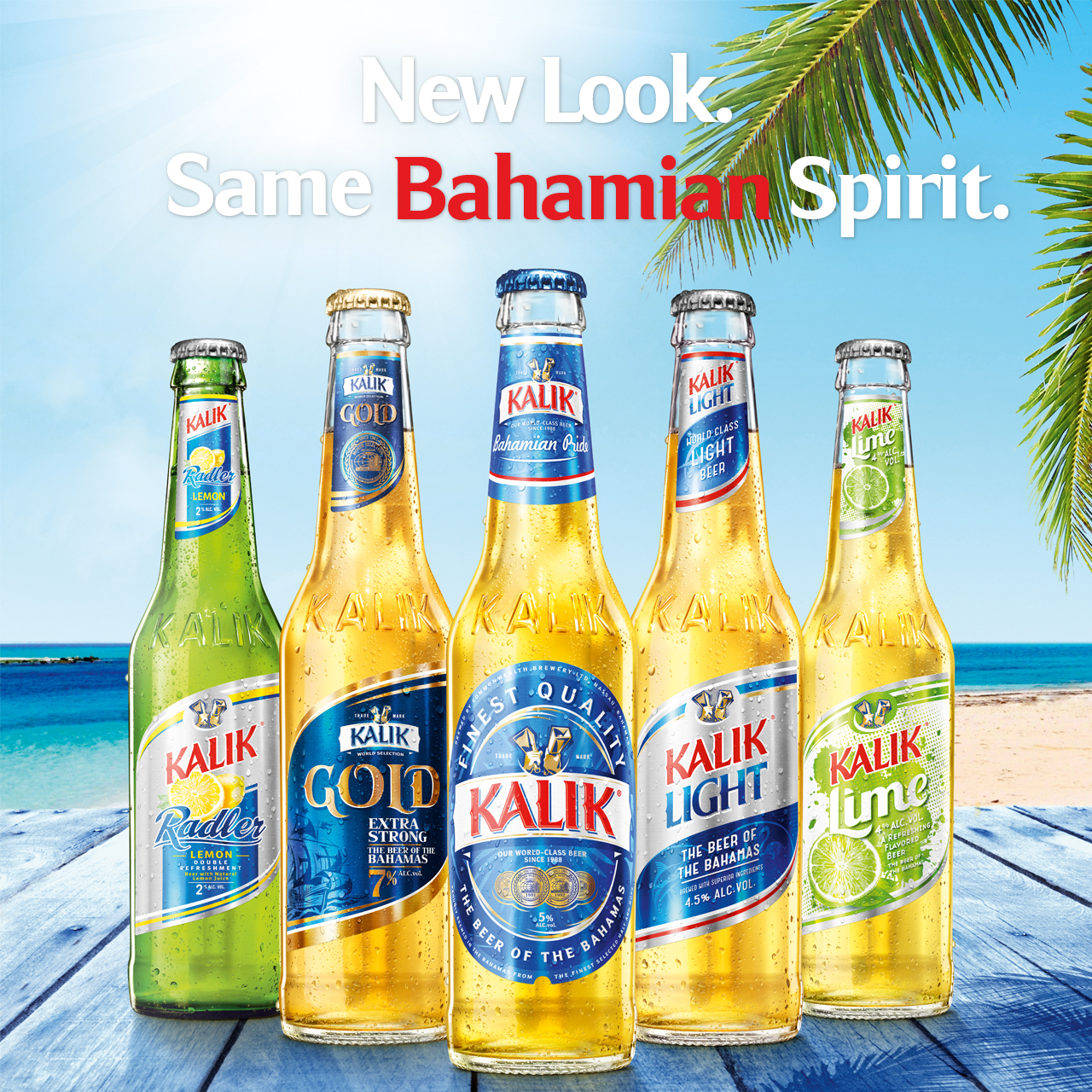
Kalik product range on a promotional image.

Kalik is a Bahamian brand of beer. It is made by the Commonwealth Brewery in Nassau which also produces Heineken, Guinness and Vitamalt.

The original Kalik is a lager with 5% alc./vol. It was designed by Heineken International in 1988, based on studies of the Bahamian market. It seized market leadership from Beck's, which had dominated the local market before. According to the bottle label the name of Kalik is derived from sound of cowbells heard during the annual Bahamian festival of Junkanoo.

There are five more variations of Kalik beer:

- Kalik Gold, is a 7% alc./vol. beer. It was first introduced in 1992 as a limited edition brew to mark the 500th anniversary of Columbus’ landing in the new world. It has since become a permanent offering.
- Kalik Light, a light beer with 4.5% alc./vol., was introduced in 1997 in response to consumers’ requests for a Bahamian light beer. The brand sponsors Bahamian regattas and other water sport events.
- Kalik Lime was introduced in 2010, Kalik beer with a hint of citrus. It is 4% alc./vol.
- Kalik Radler was introduced in May 2014. It is a 2% alc./vol. blend of Kalik beer and lemon juice.
- Kalik Light Platinum is a malt liquor with 6% alc./vol.
