= Kubuli =

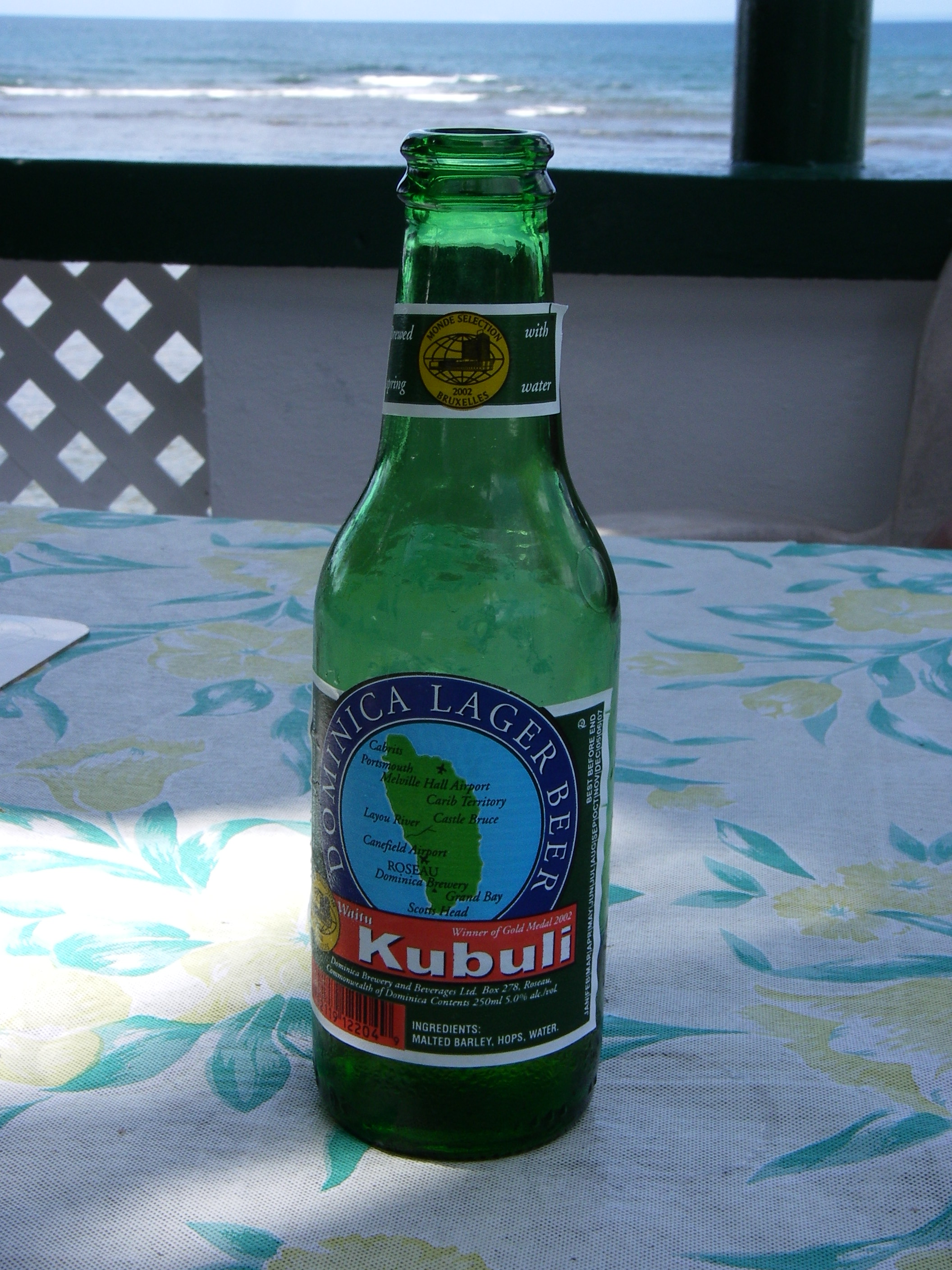
Kubuli Beer Bottle

Kubuli is a golden lager brewed in Dominica, where it is the unofficial national beer. The beer's name is derived from the Kalinago name for the island, Wai‘tu kubuli, which means "Tall is her body." The water used to make Kubuli comes from Dominica's own Loubière Springs. The beer is the flagship product of Dominica Brewery Limited, a subsidiary of Cervecería Nacional Dominicana (itself a subsidiary of AmBev, which in turn is a subsidiary of Anheuser-Busch InBev) as of February 24, 2010. As of 2018, the brand held a 68% market share of the local beer market. Dominica Brewery exports the beer across the Caribbean, to such places as Saint Lucia, Saint Kitts, Barbados, Guadeloupe, Martinique, Montserrat, Antigua and Barbuda, Anguilla, and the British and U.S. Virgin Islands.
