= Malt drink =

Fermented drink with sprouted barley

A malt drink is a fermented drink in which the primary ingredient is the grain or seed of the barley plant, which has been allowed to sprout slightly in a traditional way called "malting" before it is processed.

By far the most predominant malt drink is beer (naturally fermented barley sugars flavoured with hops), of which there are two main styles: ale and lager. A low alcohol level drink brewed in this fashion is technically identical to "non-alcoholic beer". Such a drink may be prepared by using a slightly altered brewing process that yields negligible alcohol by volume (technically less than 0.5% by volume). These are called low-alcohol beers or "near beers".

== Regulation ==
In the United States, the term "malt beverage" may be used by trade associations of groups of beer wholesalers (e.g. Tennessee Malt Beverages Association) for the sake of a professional image by using brewing craft related terms, for political or legal reasons, or to avoid potential negative connotations that may be associated with beer in a region.

=== Malternatives ===
Additionally, the term malt beverage is applied to many other flavoured drinks prepared from malted grains to which natural or artificial flavours (and sometimes colours) have been added to make them taste and appear similar to wines, fruits, colas, natural ciders, or other drinks. This subcategory has been called "malternative", as in Smirnoff Ice (US and French version).

Marketing of such products in the United States has increased rapidly in recent years. In most jurisdictions, these products are regulated in a way identical to beer, which allows a retailer with a beer license to sell a wider product line. This also generally avoids the steeper taxes and stricter regulations associated with distilled spirits.

== Examples of malt drinks ==
=== Non-alcoholic ===
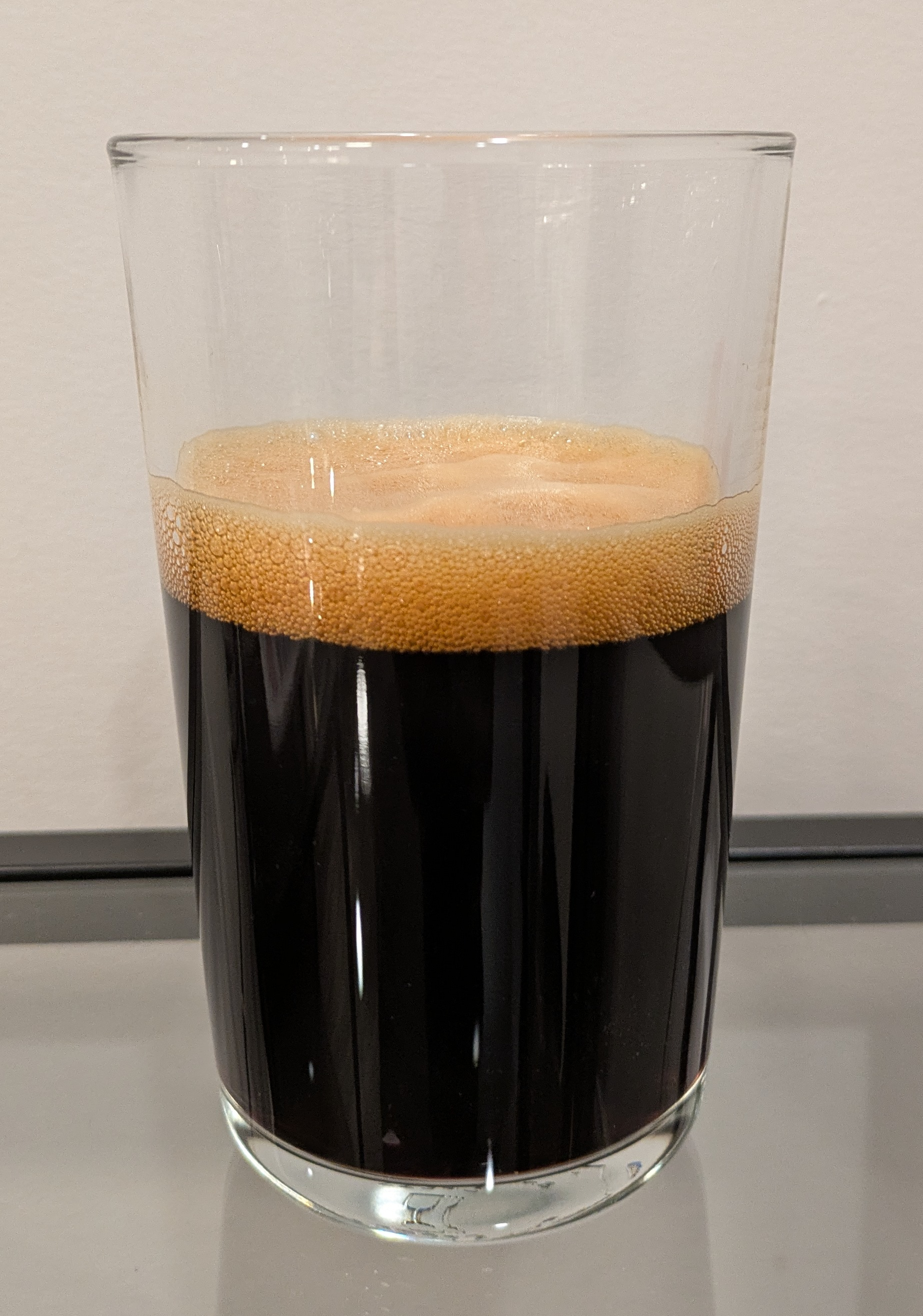
Malta

Beer-style

- Barbican (Middle East)
- Julmust (Sweden)
- Kvass (Northeastern, Central and Eastern Europe)
- Malta (primarily South America and Puerto Rico)
- Podpiwek (Poland)
- Gira (Lithuania)
- Supermalt (Afro-Caribbean and UK)
- Hoppy (Japan)
- Malta Guinness (Nigerian)
- Vitamalt (Denmark and Afro-Caribbean)

Milk-style

- Horlicks (UK)
- Malted milk
- Milkshake
- Milo (Australia and Southeast Asia)
- Ovaltine (UK)

=== Alcoholic ===
Low alcohol

- Low-alcohol beers
- Malt beer

Average alcohol

- Alcopop
- Barleywine
- Malt liquor

High alcohol

- Malt whisky
  - Single malt whisky
  - Blended malt whisky

== See also ==
- List of barley-based drinks
