= Tamboril, Dominican Republic =

Tamboril
- Location within the Dominican Republic
- Coordinates: 19°28′48″N 70°36′0″W
- Country: Dominican Republic
- Province: Santiago
- Municipality since: 1900

Area
  - Total: 63.98 km^{2} (24.70 sq mi)

Population (2012)
  - Total: 102,865
  - Density: 1,608/km^{2} (4,164/sq mi)
- Municipal Districts: 1

Tamboril is a municipality (municipio) of the Santiago province in the Dominican Republic. Tamboril is situated in the northeast part of the province, at the foot of the Cordillera Septentrional mountains, at 230 meters above sea level. The municipality has an area of 71.4 km^{2}; it borders Puerto Plata Province (North), Licey (South), Espaillat Province (East), and Santiago (West).

== History ==
The municipality was created in 1900 under the name Peña, which name it kept until 1962 when it was changed to Tamboril. The municipality contains the municipal district of Canca La Piedra, six rural sections, and 36 places (parajes). Since 2002, the mayor has been Francisco Álvarez, of the Partido Revolucionario Dominicano (PRD).

Tamboril is considered by many as the "World Capital of Cigars" housing more cigar factories and rollers than anywhere else in the world. According to magazine Tobacco Asia, 44% of the world's most traded cigars come from the Dominican Republic, the world's largest producer of cigars, especially from the fertile lands of the Cibao capital, where 90% of the factories are located The area has also been the largest supplier of cigars to the United States for decades, placing cigars as the 3rd largest export product in the country after gold and medical instruments.

Tamboril is the home of well known cigar makers such as La Aurora, La Flor Dominicana, Tabacalera Palma, and PDR Cigars, where some of the highest-rated cigars in the world are manufactured.

Tamboril is also one of the major agricultural producers in the province, principal crops being plantains, cassava, and sweet potato, which are sold in the markets in Santiago. Cigarettes and chocolates are manufactured.

Due to the proximity to Santiago, where much of the population obtains health and education, the social services in Tamboril are abbreviated and consist of a health clinic, and two rural polyclinics. There is a state school and two libraries.

== Climate ==
Tamboril has a tropical rainforest climate (Köppen: Af).

Climate data for Tamboril
Month	Jan	Feb	Mar	Apr	May	Jun	Jul	Aug	Sep	Oct	Nov	Dec	Year
Mean daily maximum °C (°F)	26.9 (80.4)	27.4 (81.3)	28.3 (82.9)	29.2 (84.6)	30.2 (86.4)	31.4 (88.5)	31.3 (88.3)	31.5 (88.7)	31.6 (88.9)	30.7 (87.3)	28.8 (83.8)	27.5 (81.5)	29.6 (85.2)
Daily mean °C (°F)	22.3 (72.1)	22.6 (72.7)	23.3 (73.9)	24.2 (75.6)	25.2 (77.4)	26.3 (79.3)	26.4 (79.5)	26.4 (79.5)	26.2 (79.2)	25.5 (77.9)	24.1 (75.4)	23.0 (73.4)	24.6 (76.3)
Mean daily minimum °C (°F)	18.7 (65.7)	18.9 (66.0)	19.4 (66.9)	20.6 (69.1)	21.7 (71.1)	22.7 (72.9)	22.9 (73.2)	23.0 (73.4)	22.6 (72.7)	22.1 (71.8)	20.9 (69.6)	19.6 (67.3)	21.1 (70.0)
Average precipitation mm (inches)	30.7 (1.21)	26.4 (1.04)	27.8 (1.09)	35.1 (1.38)	43.9 (1.73)	34.7 (1.37)	46.0 (1.81)	64.1 (2.52)	58.2 (2.29)	48.6 (1.91)	44.7 (1.76)	35.2 (1.39)	495.4 (19.5)
Source: Weather.Directory

== Notable People from Tamboril ==
- Eduardo León Jimenes, founder of La Aurora
- José León Asensio, president of Grupo León Jimenes
- Fernando Capellán, founder of Grupo M
- Federico Velázquez, ex-vice president of Dominican Republic
- Jose de Jesus Jimenez Almonte, scientist and botanist
- Horacio Vasquez Lajara, former president of Dominican Republic
- Salvador Jorge Blanco, former president of Dominican Republic
- Raymundo Polanco Alegria, founder of Aeromar
- Tomás Hernández Franco, poet
- Jose Arnaldo Blanco Dominguez, founder of Tabacalera Palma
- Jose Rafael Abinader Wassaf, politician
