= Vitamalt =

Soft drink

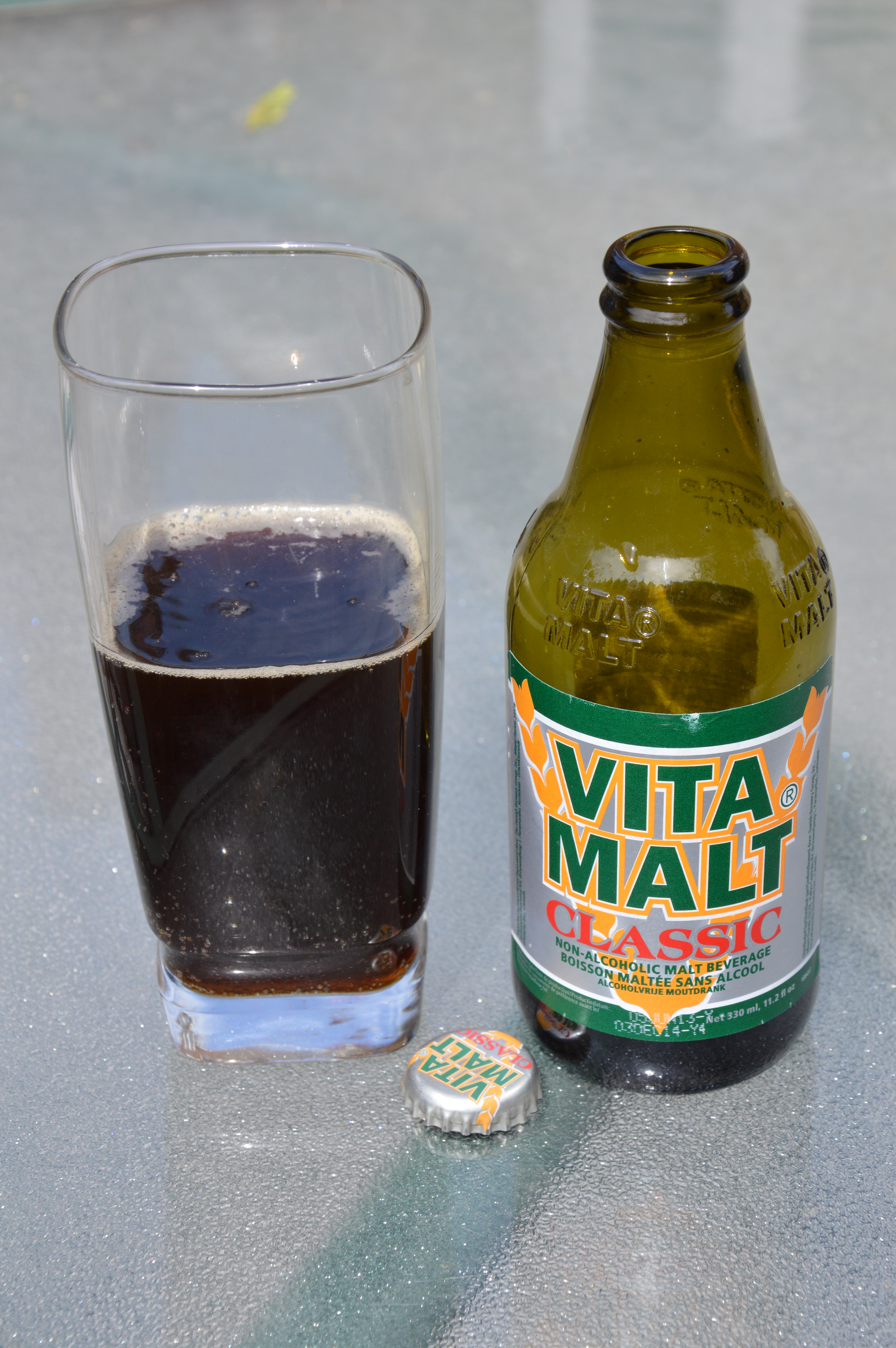
Vitamalt

Vitamalt is a brand of non-alcoholic malt drinks manufactured and originated in Denmark and its taste might be described as sweet, unfermented beer.

Vitamalt is a drink designed as an energy supplement. It is available in about 70 countries, but it is most widely known in the West Indies, where over time it has attained the status of a cultural symbol. It is also commercialized in some West African countries, such as Nigeria and Ghana.

The manufacturers have sponsored sporting events and clubs throughout the Caribbean. Cycling, running, basketball, football and amateur sports are activities that Vitamalt is usually associated with.

The malt drink is sometimes consumed as an alternative to sports drinks or energy drinks. It contains no alcohol.

The Vitamalt product range includes Vitamalt Plus, which contains acai, guarana and aloe vera, Vitamalt Ginger and Vitamalt Light, which has lower nutritional value.

The official tagline is "Vitalize naturally".

== See also ==
- Malt beer
- Malta (drink)
- Supermalt
