= Prestige (beer) =

Hatian beer brand

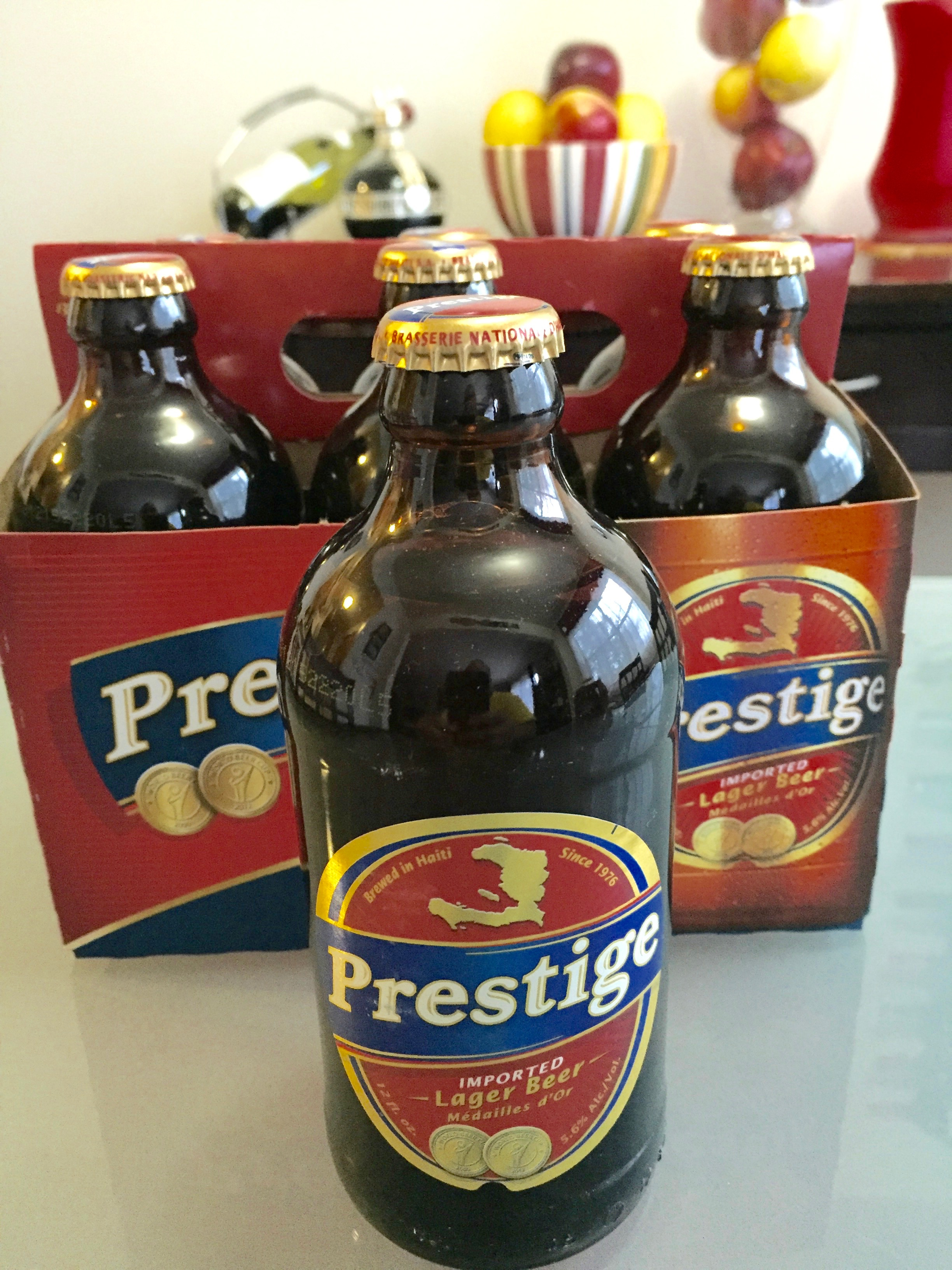
- Type: Beer
- Manufacturer: Brasserie Nationale d'Haïti (BRANA)
- Origin: Port-au-Prince, Haiti
- Introduced: 1976
- Alcohol by volume: 5.6%
- Style: Lager
- Website: www.brana.ht/prestige-brand/

Prestige is a lager brewed by Brasserie Nationale d'Haïti (BRANA) in Port-au-Prince, Haiti. It is widely consumed and is the best-selling beer in Haiti with a 98% market share. Prestige beer is available in some parts of the United States and other countries. In 2011, Heineken publicly announced it acquired a controlling interest in BRANA by increasing its ownership from 22.5% to 95%.

== History ==
Prestige was founded in 1976 by Michael Madsen; he is a member of one of the richest industrial families in Haiti. His ancestors arrived from Denmark in the late 19th century. Prestige was launched less than two years after BRANA's creation. In 2005, Prestige began to be exported to select Canadian and U.S. cities. The brand has since been bought by the Dutch brewing conglomerate and the export beer is now brewed in Holland.

== Awards ==
- 2000 World Beer Cup gold medalist, American-Style Lager category
- 2012 World Beer Cup gold medalist, American-Style Cream Ale or Lager category

== Packaging ==
In 2018, BRANA introduced its new international standard bottling line and a new blue and red label, which are the colors of the flag of Haiti. Prestige beer is available in a 12 fl. oz. and 16 fl. oz. bottles.

== See also ==
- World Beer Cup
- Cuauhtémoc Moctezuma Brewery
- Brasserie Nationale d'Haïti
- Beer in the Caribbean
