= La Flor Dominicana =

La Flor Dominicana (Dominican Flower) is a "boutique-style" cigar brand The cigars were manufactured by Tabacalera La Flor S.A. and were first produced in Santiago, Dominican Republic in 1996. The company was founded by Litto Gomez, a former jeweler turned cigar maker and Ines Lorenzo.

The company currently operates its factory in Tamboril, located in the Dominican Republic.

== History ==
The La Flor Dominicana brand was first known as Los Libertadores. The name of the brand was inspired by the flower of the tobacco plant. In the beginning the company only focused on growing binder and filler tobacco.

In 1999, the factory produced about 2.5 million cigars, up from 2.4 million in 1998. Subsequently, the company made 1.5 million cigars in 2004, 1.9 million in 2005, and 2.9 million in 2006. In 1999, the company had a fire in the cigar room at its factory and lost about 400,000 cigars.

In 2002 the company started cultivating shade grown wrapper; sun grown and encallado.

In 2006 Gomez acquired 40-acre (160,000 m^{2}) farm used for the growth of Corojo and Sumatra. He also acquired a 120-acre (0.49 km^{2}) farm where he grows tobacco for his use.
