= Red Stripe =

Pale lager brewed by Desnoes & Geddes

- Manufacturer: Desnoes & Geddes
- Introduced: 1928
- Alcohol by volume: 4.7%
- Style: Lager

Red Stripe is a 4.7% ABV pale lager brewed by Desnoes & Geddes in Jamaica and the Netherlands. Since 2015 Red Stripe has also been brewed in the United Kingdom by Heineken under licence from Desnoes & Geddes. It was first introduced in 1928 from a recipe developed by Paul H. Geddes and Bill Martindale. In 1993, Guinness Brewing Worldwide, now Diageo, acquired a controlling interest in Desnoes & Geddes, and took over international distribution in many markets. In 2015, Heineken acquired Diageo's stake and stated it would launch an offer for the shares it did not own.

== History ==
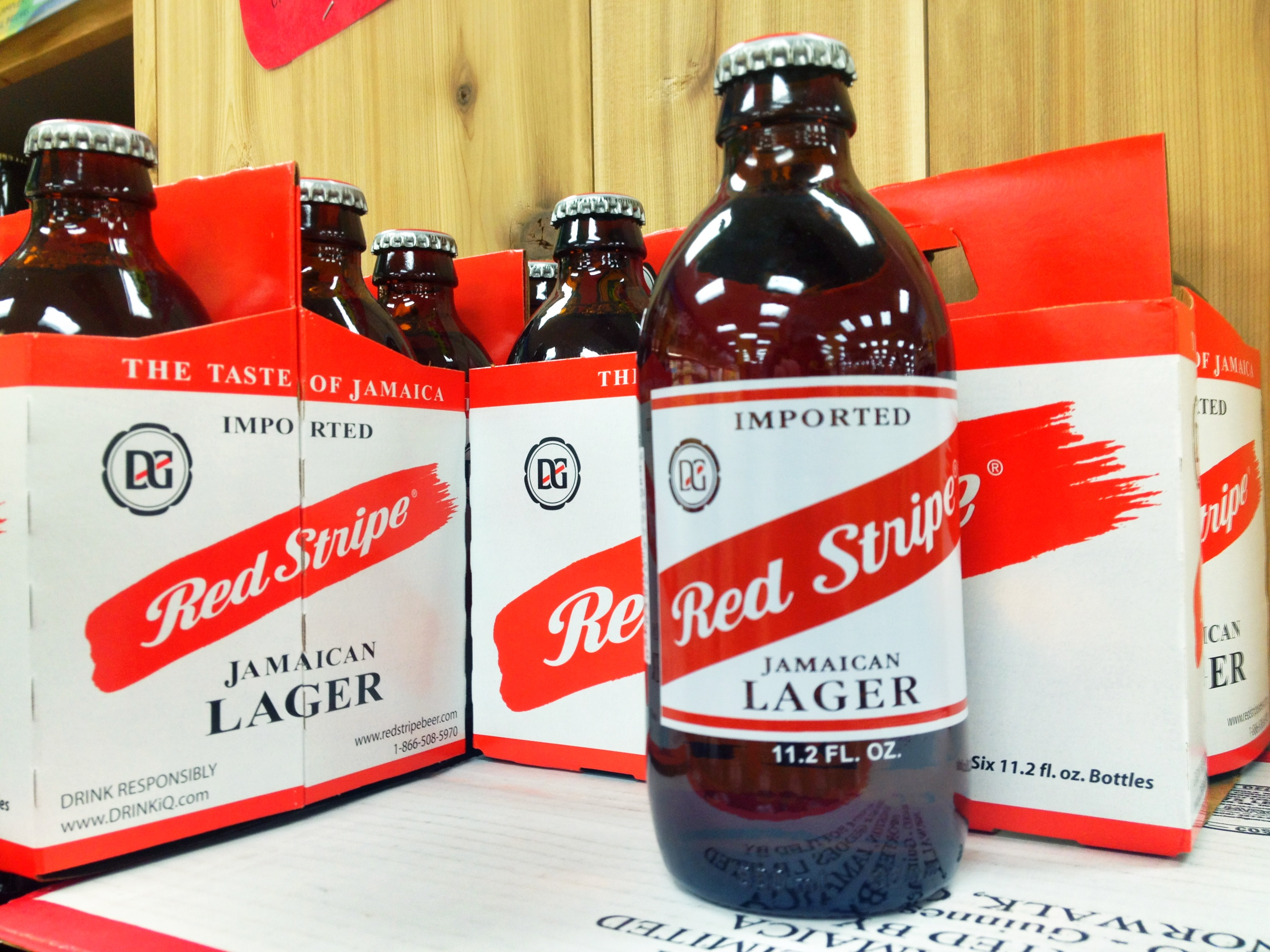
Red Stripe in its traditional stubby bottle, introduced in 1965 and reduced to 11.2 US fluid ounces (0.3 L) in 2010

Red Stripe was first produced in the early 1930s by Galena Brewing Company in Galena, Illinois, US. The company sold the recipe to British investors after facing financial troubles. The investors brought the brand and recipe to Jamaica.

Red Stripe was brewed under license in the UK from Desnoes and Geddes by the Bedford-based brewers, Charles Wells from 1976 until 2014, when Diageo made alternative supply arrangements. For part of the Charles Wells era, they brewed a stronger variant, the 9% ABV Crucial Brew, with branding in red and black.

The acquisition of Diageos' stake by Heineken in 2015 subsequently saw the production of Red Stripe return to the United Kingdom.

In 1993, 51% ownership in Desnoes & Geddes Limited was purchased by Guinness Brewing Worldwide, now Diageo, an acquisition that significantly increased the international distribution of both Red Stripe and Dragon Stout. A new Red Stripe Light has also been added, which is brewed and bottled in Jamaica and imported by Guinness USA of White Plains, New York.

=== United States ===
Red Stripe was first imported to the United States in 1985, with poor initial results. Seeking to mimic the success of Heineken, Red Stripe for export was packaged in green standard 12 U.S. fl oz (355 mL; 12.5 imp fl oz) bottles. American consumers exposed to Red Stripe through their travels to Jamaica, as well as Jamaican expatriates, were reluctant to try the brand in the States since it was not packaged in its distinctive squat brown bottle and painted label. This marketing issue was resolved only to have shipments temporarily suspended in January 1989 due to cannabis smuggling in shipping containers discovered in the Port of Miami. Red Stripe recovered and rode the popularity of dance hall and reggae in the early 1990s to well over a million cases of annual distribution. Red Stripe is a significant sponsor of reggae, ska, and other music events, including the annual Reggae Sumfest hosted in Montego Bay.

Diageo introduced canned Red Stripe, brewed under contract by Moosehead in New Brunswick, to the United States market in 2009.

In the U.S. in 2010, the bottling size was reduced from a typical 12 oz. per serving to 11.2 oz. per serving which is equivalent to the typical metric serving of 0.33 litre.

In 2012, Diageo moved production of the U.S. supply of Red Stripe from Jamaica to the U.S., contract-brewed for it by City Brewing Co. of La Crosse, Wisconsin, at its Latrobe Brewing Company facility in Pennsylvania. Desnoes & Geddes still made Red Stripe for Jamaica, Brazil, Canada and Europe.

Lack of consumer acceptance of U.S.-brewed Red Stripe resulted in brewing for the States returning to Jamaica. On 7 September 2016 the company celebrated the shipment of the first container of Red Stripe to be exported to the United States from Jamaica in 4 years. The company said this historic move was core to the company's mission of re-establishing Jamaica as the global hub for the Jamaican brand.

It was still being imported to the U.S. in 2023, from Jamaica in bottles, and the Netherlands in kegs and cans.

== Advertising ==
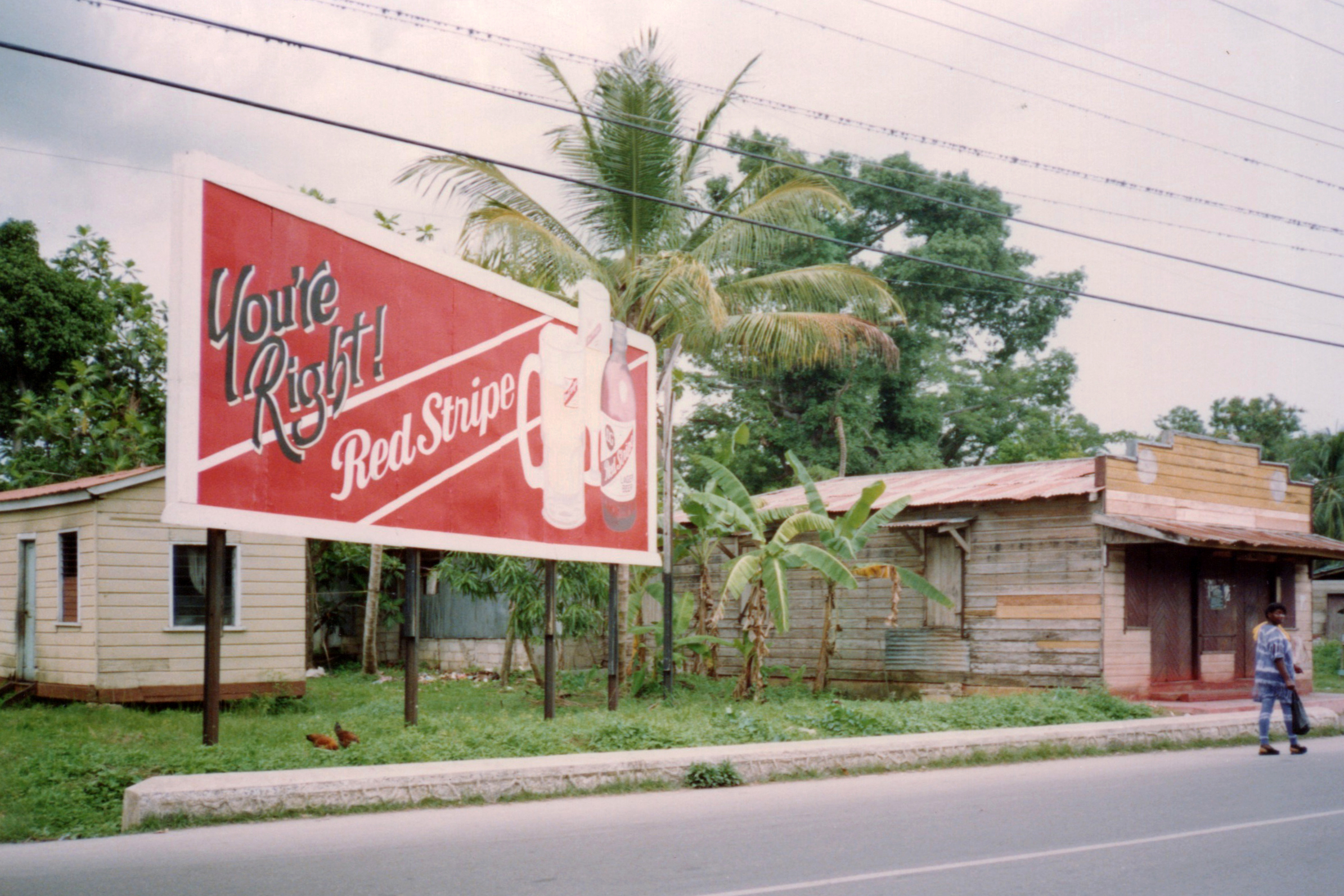
Red Stripe billboard in Savanna-la-Mar, Jamaica (1990)

In North America, a television advertising campaign launched in 2001 features Dorrel Salmon playing a comedic take on a Jamaican man, using variations on the catchphrase, "Hooray, beer!" In the UK, the advertising campaign plays on the 'easy vibe' of Jamaican Beer, with catchphrases such as "easy now."

== Sponsorship ==
Red Stripe has been an intermittent sponsor of the Jamaica national bobsled team. In February 2018, following turmoil within the Jamaica Olympic women's bobsled team, Red Stripe stepped in at the last minute to sponsor a new bobsled so that the team could compete in the Pyeongchang 2018 Olympics as planned.

Other major sporting sponsorship activities have included a commitment as the Caribbean regional sponsor for the 2007 Cricket World Cup and a J$100 million sponsorship commitment to the Jamaican Football Federation in support of the national team's regional qualifying efforts for the 2010 FIFA World Cup.

In 2007, under the guidance of brand manager Jonny Kirkham, Red Stripe initiated a campaign in the UK to support new music by sponsoring events such as the Camden Crawl and The Great Escape festivals, as well as hosting a number of free music events with artists such as The View and The Rifles. Recent work with new bands puts this initiative in direct competition with the likes of Carling as a featured sponsor of the underground music scene. In support of this promotional strategy, the Red Stripe Music Awards were initiated between 2007 and 2010, with the winner of the award receiving featured billing at two music festivals, Blissfields and The Great Escape, and the opportunity to tour with a high-profile act. Winners of the award included The Runners, Ben Howard, Klaus Says Buy The Record, and The Laurel Collective, while judges ranged from musicians such as Guy Garvey, music journalists and brand representatives from Red Stripe. As a result, brand sales grew significantly with Red Stripe becoming available throughout Camden, Manchester, Glasgow, Brighton and in key music venues across the UK. During this period, Red Stripe continued to be the unofficial beer of the Notting Hill Carnival which it has been since 1976.

Writer and music festival PR Alex Lee Thomson also presented a series of web-based interviews for the brand during their sponsorship periods of Camden Crawl and The Great Escape festivals in the UK, while editing their music-based website.

Red Stripe sponsors sports talk television program Pardon the Interruption during the summer months, alternating with Guinness. Also recently Red Stripe began sponsoring the International Festival of Thumb Wrestling held annually in Mason City, Iowa. Red Stripe also sponsored Ignite Urban competition along with SUM Entertainment.

Red Stripe Light has also been announced as the official beer category Major Sponsor for the 2010 Zwack Air Hockey World Championships taking place in July 2010 in Houston, Texas.

== See also ==
- Jamaican cuisine
