= Supermalt =

Non-alcoholic malt beverage

An image of the supermalt drink

Supermalt is a non-alcoholic, caffeine-free malt drink that was originally developed for the Nigerian Army in 1972 as a food supplement. It has a high content of B vitamins, minerals and nutrients, and carbohydrates. Supermalt is now produced by Royal Unibrew A/S in Denmark. It is most popular among the African and Afro-Caribbean community. Today, it has a 70% share in the market as a non-alcoholic drink in the UK alone.

== Production ==
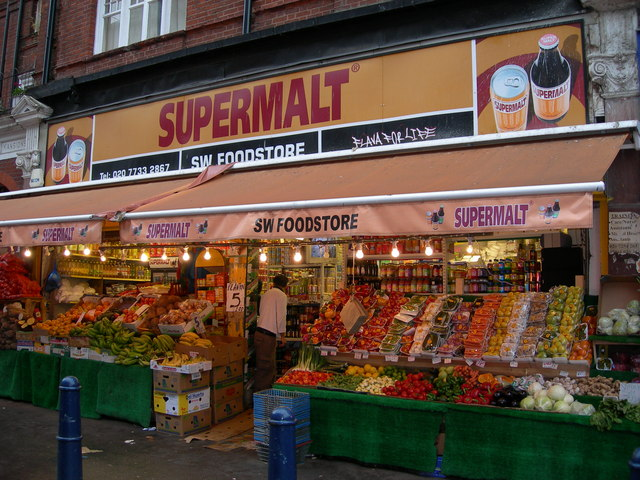
A Supermalt sponsored food shop on Electric Avenue in Brixton, London

Non-alcoholic malt drinks can be made by either the traditional brewing method, where barley is steeped into malt and then brewed into a creamy, rich consistency, or made like a soft drink by using malt extract. Supermalt uses traditional brewing skills for all its non-alcoholic batches.

The main difference between non-alcoholic malt drinks and non-alcoholic beers is that malt drinks are usually sweet and always dark in colour. The sweet notes are a combination of naturally occurring glucose, fructose, saccharose, maltose and maltotriose.

Various products of Supermalt are sold in more than 70 countries, and are mostly popular among the African and African-Caribbean communities in the UK. The primary consumer target group for malt drinks is the African-Caribbean population, which represents more than 1 million people in the UK, London being the largest single European market for malt drinks.

== Nutritional value ==
Supermalt is made solely from raw materials of vegetable origin, except for the B-vitamins, which are synthetic.

== Product variants ==
- Supermalt Mango/Passionfruit is a fruity, lighter alternative to the original Supermalt.
- Supermalt Less Sugar launched in 2018, containing 30% less sugar.
- Supermalt Foreign Extra Stout, the first alcoholic drink created by the company introduced in July 2025.

=== Ingredients ===
Water, barley malt (7,6% of the total liquid), barley, sugar, colour (E150c), carbon dioxide, liquorice, vitamins (Niacin (B3), Thiamin (B1), Pantothenic acid (B5), Riboflavin (B2), Vitamin (B6)).
