= Grupo León Jimenes =

Latin American conglomerate

E. León Jimenes
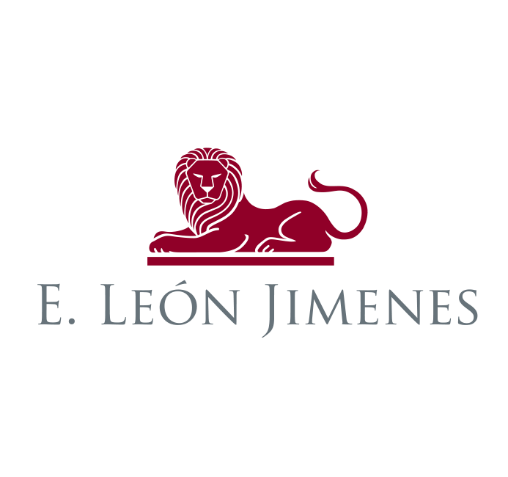
- Type: Private
- Industry: Investment Management
- Founded: 1903
- Founder: Eduardo León Jimenes
- Website: eleonjimenes.com

E. León Jimenes is a holding vehicle controlled by the León family in the consumer sector in Latin America. This corporation was historically involved in mainly two markets — fabrication and distribution of beverages and tobacco cultivation and manufacture of cigarettes—. The company's actual beverage portfolio includes a minority stake in Cervecería Nacional Dominicana, owner of Presidente beer, one of the top sellers in the Caribbean, in partnership with Anheuser-Busch InBev. E. León Jimenes has a diversified portfolio with investments in consumer, telecommunications, healthcare, industrials, and other sectors.

== History ==
In 1903, Eduardo Antonio León Jimenes (Guazumal, Tamboril, Santiago, 1884-1937) founded La Aurora, a cigar factory in the Dominican Republic. The factory was located in the community of Don Pedro, Guazumal, near Tamboril, which is now famous for its cigars. His father, Antonio Gavino León González (1848-1914), had purchased tobacco lands in Guazumal from the Hernández and Polanco families of Tamboril at the end of the 19th century. Some tobacco came from that area, and other fields were in Gurabo, Jacagua and El Ingenio, five or six miles away. At the time, the country was an undeveloped Caribbean nation, and had only gained independence from Haiti in 1844 after twenty-two years of occupation, and from Spain in 1865, after four years of colonial reannexation. Until that moment, fine cigars, in the eyes of the world, came from Cuba and nowhere else.

In 1903, the Dominican Republic still had dirt roads, which difficulted transportation, and to make cigars La Aurora had to pack tobacco in wood containers and ship them by donkey. The rainy season created a quagmire and the beasts of burden trudged through the muck to deliver tobacco to the tiny factory. The first La Aurora’s cigars were perfectos, pointed at each end with a bulbous middle. The cigars were called preferidos. Sales, like the cigars, were entirely within the Dominican territory. In 1912, Herminio León Jimenes – Eduardo's brother – suggested moving the fabric to Santiago; said move was made during the end of that year.

U.S. military forces marched into the Dominican Republic and occupied the country from 1916 to 1924. Various local generals vied for power and civilians took the streets. Before La Aurora's 30th anniversary, with the revolutions and the uproar, the company was forced to stop production. In 1930, just a few months before the movement that ended the government of President Horacio Vásquez and the acquisition of power by General Rafael Trujillo, the company La Aurora was transformed into E. León Jimenes, C. por A., which was created with the purpose of acquiring La Aurora cigar factory, along with the exclusive rights to use its trademarks and commercial names.

In 1930, General Rafael Trujillo seized power from President Horacio Vásquez, creating a dictatorship that lasted for more than three decades. In the government of Trujillo business opportunities became limited. La Aurora wanted to expand its business from the commercialization of cigars into the lucrative cigarette trade business, but Trujillo owned the only company that was producing cigarettes at the time and was actively monopolizing the production and commercialization of tobacco. Despite these restrictive conditions, E. León Jimenes, C. por A. decided to ask Trujillo permission to produce cigarettes. At first, his answer was positive, however it shortly became a resounding no, as he passed laws making it impossible for new entrants to compete due to the highly elevated duties.

== Growth and expansion ==
Trujillo's assassination in 1961 created more civil unrest, but it did provide an opportunity for E. León Jimenes, C. por A., including La Aurora cigar factory, to expand. As soon as Trujillo was assassinated, the directives of the company began to subscribe new contracts, generate new relationships and build its first cigarette factory in the city of Santiago de los Caballeros. The 1960s, with its airs of freedom and innovation, led to the consolidation of the company. From the rural community of Don Pedro, Guazumal, in 1903, with around five workers and a production of 600 cigars per day, the enterprise consolidated its prestige based on its excellent confection, and a superior quality that was evidenced in its texture, smell and flavor, which later allowed it to compete with other brands more known and powerful in the country. Its cigars’ brand offer grew, new marketing and distribution strategies were applied, practices of good citizenship and remuneration to staff were systematized, and the subscribed capital was increased, incorporating new shareholders to the company.

By April 1963 was inaugurated its cigarette factory, and by 1969, six years later, E. León Jimenes, C. por A. forged a relationship with the multinational Philip Morris International, the biggest fabricator – worldwide – of cigars, by means of the subscription of an association contract. As a result of the new partnership with Philip Morris, the company initiated production and commercialization of internationally recognized brands like Marlboro, launched in the Dominican Republic in October 1969. Four years later, the Nacional brand was incorporated, which was the first cigar of blond tobacco harvested in the country, which later became a local market leader.

The development of the tobacco industry turned E. León Jimenes, C. por A. into an important company steered it towards its next grand venture, initiating its first diversification with its entry in the beer industry.

In July 1979, the Sociedad Cervecera Nacional, S.A. was created. Later, it changed its name to Cervecería Bohemia, S.A., which was controlled in its majority by E. León Jimenes, C. por A., producing and commercializing in the country brands such as Bohemia, Heineken and Malta Löwenbräu. In 1980, E. León Jimenes purchased a brewery in Alaska, and shipped the brewery by boat to the Caribbean. The first year the company captured 28 percent of the market. Afterwards, in January 1986, a very important year for the company, E. León Jimenes, C. por A. was able to buy out its largest competitor, Cervecería Nacional Dominicana, S.A., known by its king brand Presidente, allowing it to control nearly 98 percent of the market. Amid 1986, Cervecería Bohemia, S.A. merged with Cervecería Nacional Dominicana, S.A.

With the incorporation of Cervecería Nacional Dominicana, S.A. to the growing group of companies controlled by E. León Jimenes, C. por A., an ambitious program of expansion, modernization and substantial investments initiated, including the creation of new areas to get intimately involved in the maintenance of Cervecería Nacional Dominicana, S.A. in a prominent place within the national industry. In the 1990s, new markets were reached with the exportation of the king brand Presidente to the Caribbean islands and the United States of America. Likewise, the exportation of cigars to some countries of Europe, Asia and Latin America was initiated from La Aurora.

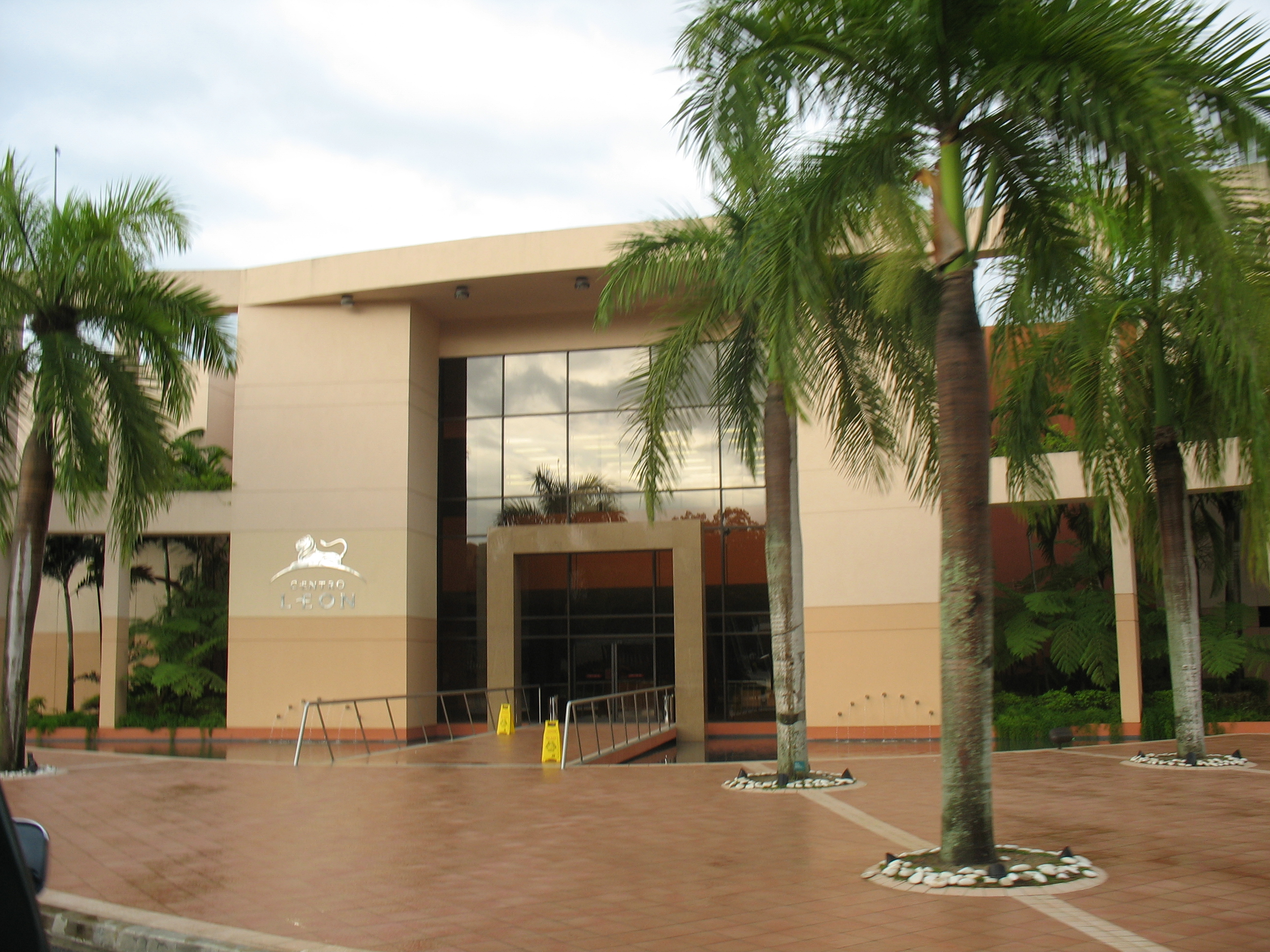
Centro León in Santiago

== Twenty-first century ==
The marketing magazine Mercado published the results of many surveys conducted by Read & Asociados in which E. León Jimenes, S.A. was ranked as "the most admired company" in the Dominican Republic for multiple years. In 2003, celebrating its 100th anniversary, E. León Jimenes, S.A. inaugurated a 10-story corporate office building in Santo Domingo and published two books. In addition, the León family opened a cultural center in Santiago de los Caballeros named Centro León and continued with its diversification process, expanding its banking business by acquiring the fourth-largest bank in the Dominican Republic in the same year. At a ceremony celebrated on December 2, 2003, the León family announced the creation of the Banco León, S.A., by a merger between the Banco Nacional de Credito (Bancredito). and Banco Profesional. Later, Banco León merge with Banco BHD becoming Banco Múltiple BHD León, S.A., the second largest bank in the Dominican Republic.

In November 2006, E. León Jimenes, S.A. made a business reorganization and sold its interest in the cigarette business to Philip Morris International. Additionally, on May 25, 2011, E. León Jimenes, S.A. sold its stake in the cigars factory La Aurora to Guillermo C. León Herbert.

On 16 April 2012, Anheuser-Busch InBev's Brazilian unit AmBev agreed to buy a controlling stake in the brewer Cervecería Nacional Dominicana, S.A. from E. León Jimenes, S.A. for over US$1.2 billion, forming the biggest beverage company in the Caribbean.

In 2017, E. León Jimenes, S.A. sold an additional equity stake of a thirty percent (retaining a 15%) of Cervecería Nacional Dominicana, S.A. to AmBev for US$926 million. Since then, E. León Jimenes, S.A. and Ambev, S.A. have extended their joint venture on several occasions.
