= Cervecería Nacional Dominicana =

Dominican alcohol producer

Cerveceria Nacional Dominicana
- Industry: Alcoholic beverage
- Founded: 1929; 97 years ago
- Founder: Charles H. Wanzer
- Headquarters: 18.437551°N 69.939481°W; Santo Domingo, Dominican Republic
- Area served: Caribbean, United States and Europe
- Products: Beer, Malta, Rum, Energizers, Sodas
- Owner: Grupo León Jimenes, AmBev
- Website: www.cnd.com.do (in Spanish)

Cerveceria Nacional Dominicana (CND), is the primary beer producer in the Dominican Republic, the company is owned by AmBev and Grupo León Jimenes. It was founded in 1929 by the American entrepreneur Charles H. Wanzer. It was the first brewery in the Dominican Republic and the largest in the Antilles and Central America with sales of 3.8 million hectoliters. It first released its major brand Presidente in 1935, and has since expanded to other brands such as Bohemia Especial, Presidente Light and Ambar. The first two are pilsener beers that fall in the category of lager beers, and the latter is the company's first incursion into dark beer. Its current brewery complex was opened in 1951. It employs 2,500 people and produces up to 500 million liters of beer.

The CND's facilities have been certified ISO 9001/2000 and 14001/2004.

== AmBev ==
In June 2012, Anheuser-Busch InBev's Brazilian unit AmBev agreed to buy a controlling stake in the Dominican Republic-based brewer Cerveceria Nacional Dominicana (CND) for over $1.2 billion, forming the biggest beverage company in the Caribbean. The purchase was for a 41% stake in the CND from Grupo Leon Jimenes and an additional $200 million for Heineken's 10% stake in the CND, giving AmBev 51% majority ownership of the CND.

== Products ==
=== Beers ===
- Presidente- Pilsner with 5% abv. Created in 1935.
- Presidente Light- Light Pilsner with 4.1% abv. Created in 2005.
- Bohemia- Pilsner, lager with 5.0% abv.
- Bohemia Light- Pilsener with 4.3% abv.
- Bohemia Especial- Pilsner with 7.2% abv. Created in 1983.
- Bohemia Especial Light- Light Pilsner with 4.3% abv. Created in 2009.
- The One- Pilsner wireated in 2006.
- Brahma Light with 3.8% abv.
- Presidente Black 6.0% abv.

=== Maltas ===
- Malta Morena
- Lowenbrau
- Vita Malt Plus
- Malta Bohemia

=== Soft Drinks ===
- Red Rock Dominican Republic
  - Red Rock Uva (Grape)
  - Red Rock Chicle (Bubblegum)
  - Red Rock Frambuesa (Raspberry)
  - Red Rock Manzana Verde (Green Apple)
  - Red Rock Naranja (Orange)
  - Red Rock Merengue (Meringue)
  - Red Rock Azul (Blue)
- Enriquillo
- Montpellier
- Guaraná Antarctica with license from Brazil
- Coco Rico with license from Puerto Rico
- 7UP with license from USA
- Pepsi with license from USA

=== Waters ===
- Enriquillo
- Montpellier

=== Rums ===
- Barceló- award-winning rum that began production in 1930.

=== Energy drinks ===
- 911
- Red Bull with license from Austria

== List of chairmen ==
1	Charles H. Wanzer	1929 – ??		
2	James A. Stuart	?? – 1978		
3	James A. Stuart, Jr.	1978 – 1986		
4	José León Asensio	1986 – 1993		
5	Rafael Guillermo Menicucci Vila	1993 –&thin	Franklin León Herbert	2010 – present
