= Piton (beer) =

Brand of beer

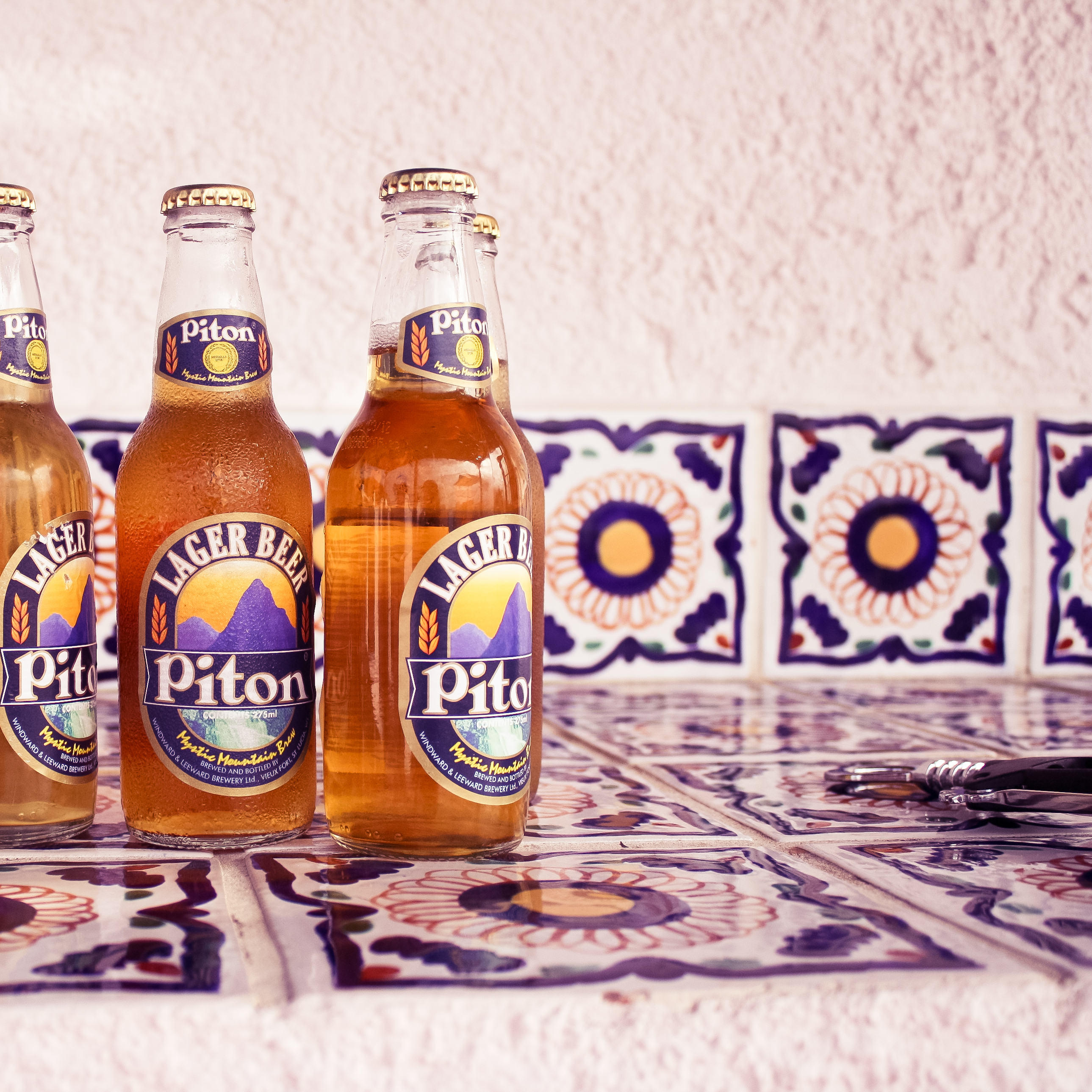
- Mystic Mountain Brew
- Manufacturer: Windward & Leeward Brewing Limited
- Introduced: 1992 in Vieux Fort, Saint Lucia
- Alcohol by volume: 5.0%
- Style: Pilsner

Piton is a Pilsner beer brand from the island of Saint Lucia, brewed by Windward & Leeward Brewing Limited, which is owned by Heineken. The beer was named for the Gros Piton and Petit Piton mountains on the island. It was first brewed on October 7, 1992.
