= Malt beer =

Low-alcohol brewed beverage

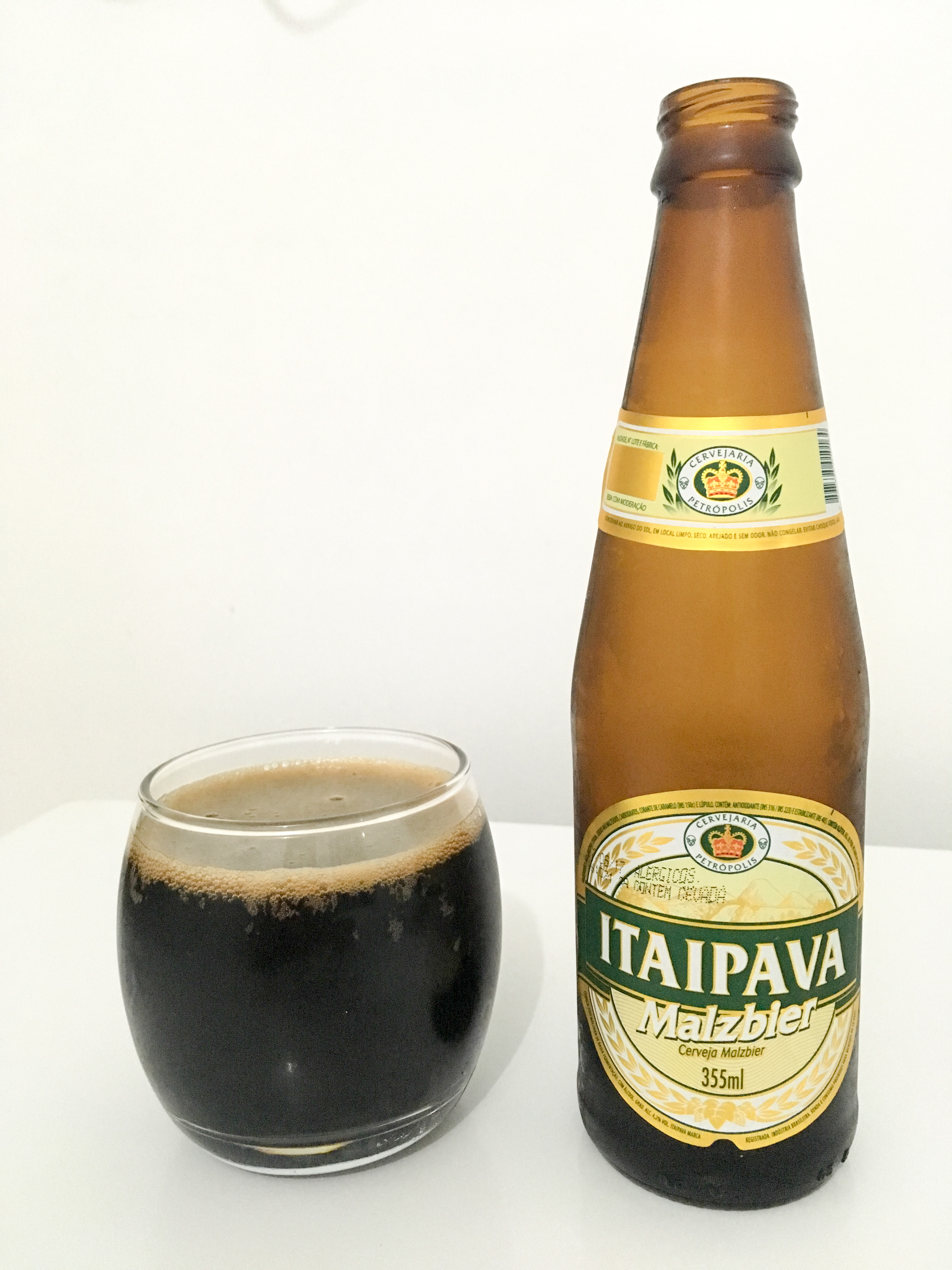
A bottle of Brazilian malt beer (Malzbier)

Malt beer is a sweet, low-alcohol beer (0–2.5% ABV) that is brewed like regular beer but with low or minimal fermentation. To keep the alcohol content low, one of two methods may be used: either the yeast is added at about 0 °C (resulting in an alcohol content of under 0.5% ABV) or fermentation is halted at the desired alcohol content (usually in the range of 1 to 2% ABV). It is made from barley malt syrup, sugar, yeast, hops, and water.

Malt beer is considered to be nutritious and is sometimes given to breastfeeding mothers. Among the ancient Egyptians, their form of malt beer (zythum) was considered to work as both a laxative and antidiarrheal; it was considered dangerous, however, for the sick or pregnant to drink it.

In the United Kingdom, Danish malt drinks have become popular amongst the South Asian community and have been sold in their dedicated supermarkets since the 1970s.

After soft drinks, malt beer is one of the most popular beverages sold in Iceland. The two main brands are Egils Maltextrakt (1.2% ABV) and Víking Maltöl (0.9% ABV). Additionally, a seasonal hvítöl is available in the Christmas month (2.2% ABV). The Icelandic malt beer was modelled on the Danish maltøl, which is still brewed by at least one company in Denmark.

In Southern Brazil, with its large communities of German immigrants, a brand called Brahma Malzbier (4% ABV) is very popular and it is mainly consumed during the winter months.

Varieties of malt beer are also popular in some Caribbean countries.

West African brands include Guinness Malt, Amstel Malt, Maltex, and Malteni. These are sold as energy drinks.

== See also ==
- Malt drink
- Malta
