= Presidente (beer) =

Dominican beer brand

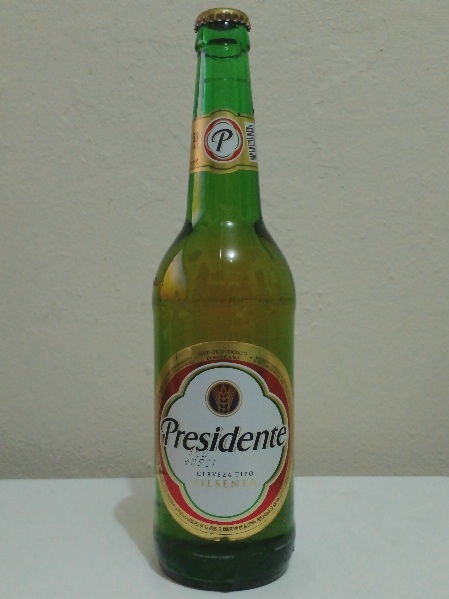
- A bottle of Presidente beer
- Type: Beer
- Manufacturer: Cervecería Nacional Dominicana (CND)
- Origin: Dominican Republic
- Introduced: 1935 in Santiago, Dominican Republic
- Alcohol by volume: 5.0%
- Style: Pilsner
- Website: presidente.com.do (in Spanish)

Presidente is a brand of Pilsner beer that is owned and produced by Cervecería Nacional Dominicana (CND) at several breweries in the Dominican Republic. In addition to domestic consumption in the Dominican Republic, Presidente is exported to the United States, Panama, Honduras, Spain, Germany, Switzerland, Italy, Andorra, Aruba, Cuba, Curaçao, Antigua, Belize, Martinique, Guadeloupe, Turks and Caicos, The Bahamas, Saint Martin, British Virgin Islands and Puerto Rico. Varieties include Presidente (5.0% ABV), Presidente Light (4.3 ABV), Presidente Black (6.0% ABV), The One (4.7% ABV), Bohemia (5.0% ABV), Bohemia Light (3.8% ABV), Bohemia Especial (7.2% ABV). Bohemia Especial Light (4.3 ABV), Bohemia Light (4.3% ABV) and Brahma (3.8% ABV.)

== History ==
In 1929, U.S. industrialist Charles H. Wanzer with other business partners founded the brewery and started brewing the iconic Dominican beer, Presidente, in 1935. The beer was named in honor of then Dominican president Rafael Trujillo. Presidente was initially launched as a dark beer and acquired limited success, yet in the 1960s Presidente was transformed into the pilsner that is recognized today. In 1986, the brewery was acquired by Dominican cigarette company Grupo León Jimenes. In 2012, Anheuser-Busch InBev's Brazilian unit AmBev agreed to buy a controlling stake in the Dominican Republic-based brewer Cerveceria Nacional Dominicana (CND) from Grupo Leon Jimenes for over $2 billion, forming the biggest beverage company in the Caribbean.

The Anheuser-Busch version of Presidente sold in the United States is brewed in St. Louis, Missouri ("for a fresher taste" according to text on the label).

== Sponsorship partners ==
Some of Presidente's export partners include the University of Miami Hurricanes, the Miami Marlins, and the Miami Heat. In 2007, Presidente was the official beer of the University of Miami Hurricanes, NCAA football team as well as the now defunct Orange Bowl in Miami. In 2009, Presidente became the Miami Heat's official imported beer. In 2012, Presidente became an official sponsor of the Miami Marlins. It was even mentioned in 2012 by former Marlins manager, Ozzie Guillén, as a cure after being defeated 15-5 versus the Boston Red Sox:

"Seven Presidentes and a sleeping pill and be ready for the job tomorrow."

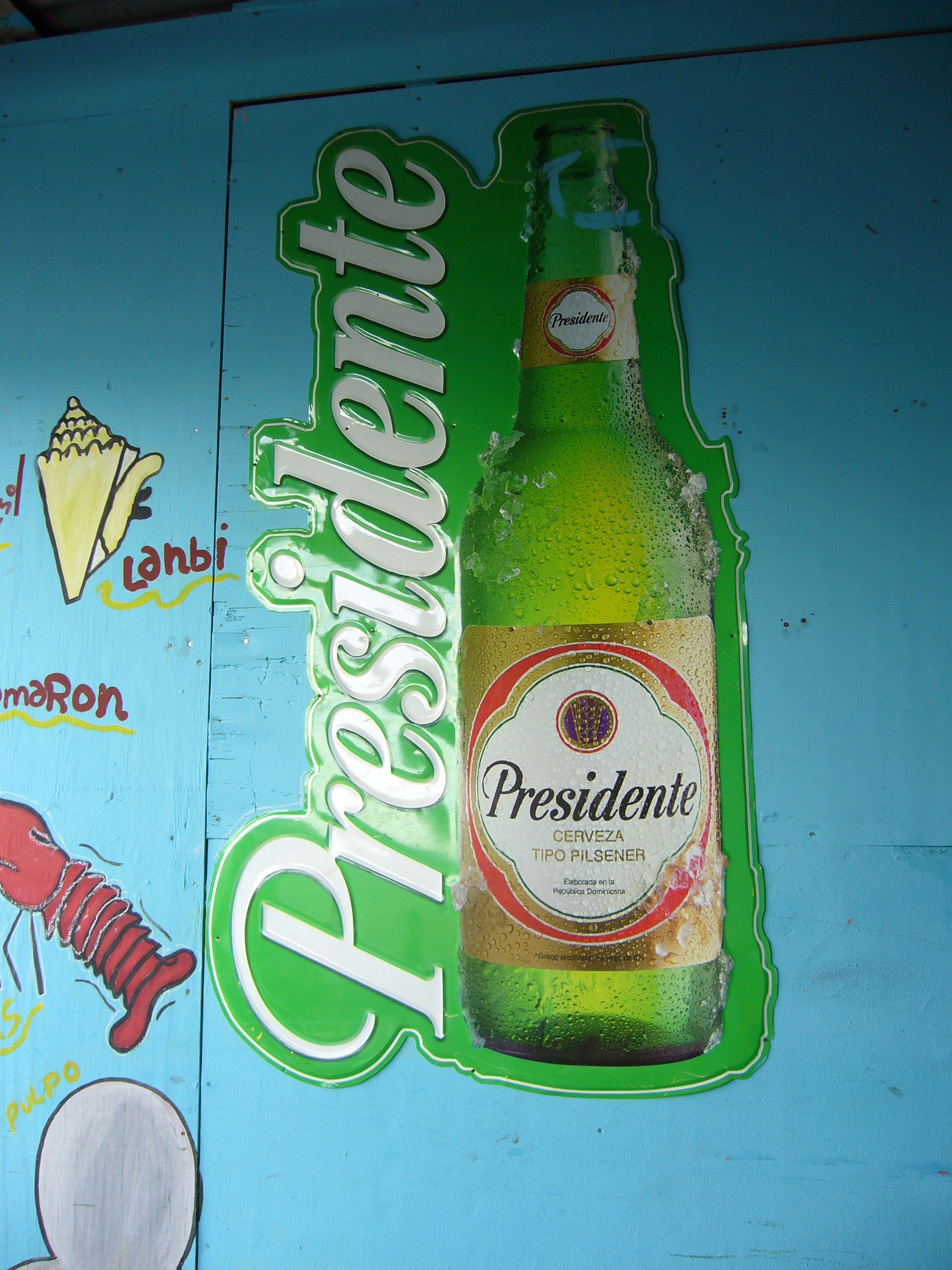
Presidente advertisement

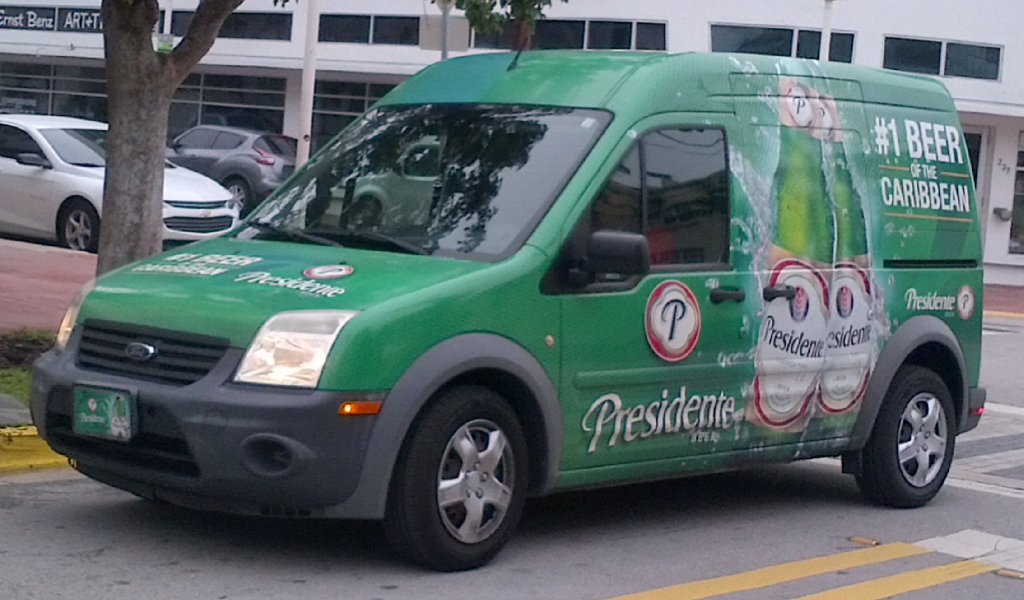
A Ford Transit connect Presidente beer

Since 2007, Presidente has also hosted Festival Presidente de Música Latina (Presidente Festival of Latin Music), which is a three-day event in October that showcases Dominican and International musical talent. It is held at the Estadio Olímpico Félix Sánchez of Santo Domingo, Dominican Republic.

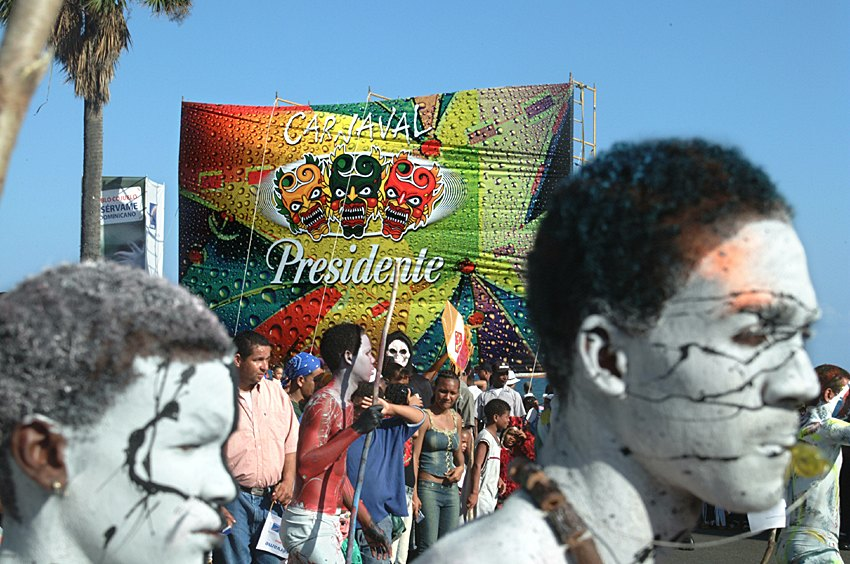
Carnivals with Presidente as sponsor
