= Malta (soft drink) =

Carbonated malt beverage

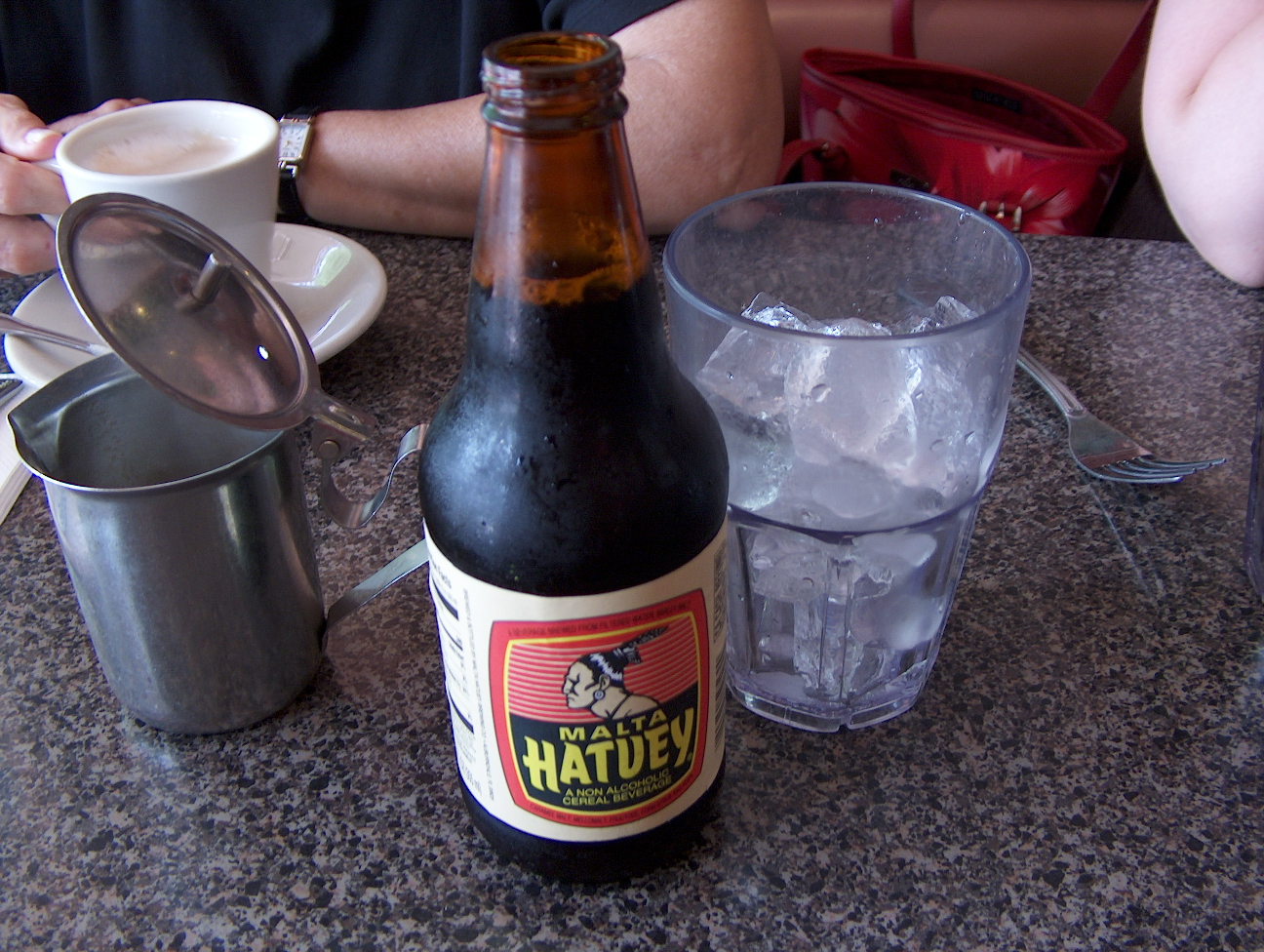
A bottle of Malta next to a glass of ice

Malta is a lightly carbonated, non-alcoholic malt beverage brewed from barley, hops, and water. Corn and caramel color may also be added.

== Maltín Polar ==
Maltín Polar is a popular non-alcoholic drink manufactured initially in Venezuela.

== Malta Goya ==
Malta Goya is a non-alcoholic beverage drink manufactured by the Goya Foods brand. Goya is popular in the Caribbean and some South American countries.

== Malta India ==
Malta India is a non-alcoholic beverage drink manufactured by the Compañía Cervecera de Puerto Rico brand in Mayaguez, Puerto Rico. Malta India is popular in the Caribbean and some South American countries.

== Gallery ==
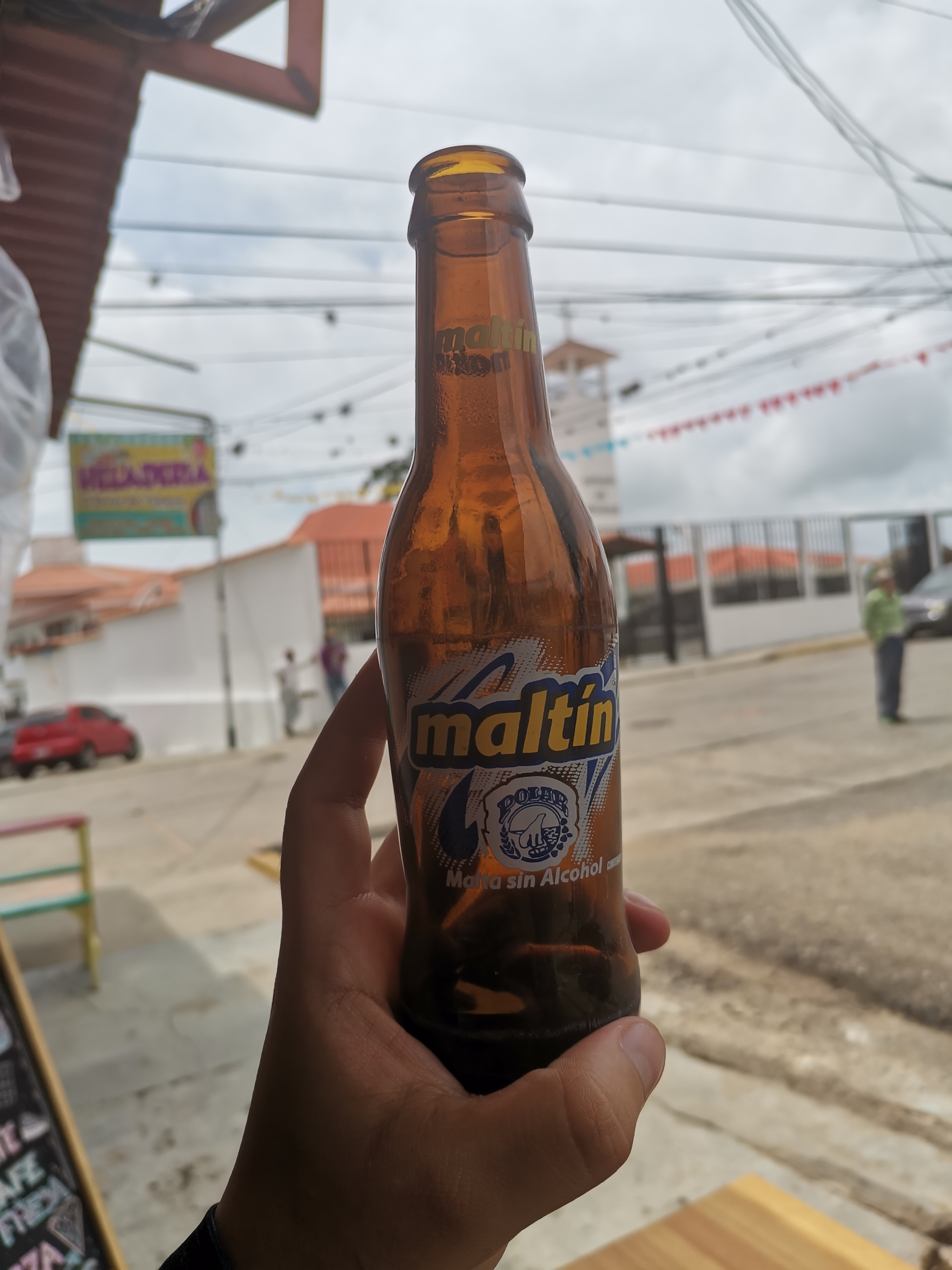
Maltín Polar (VEN)

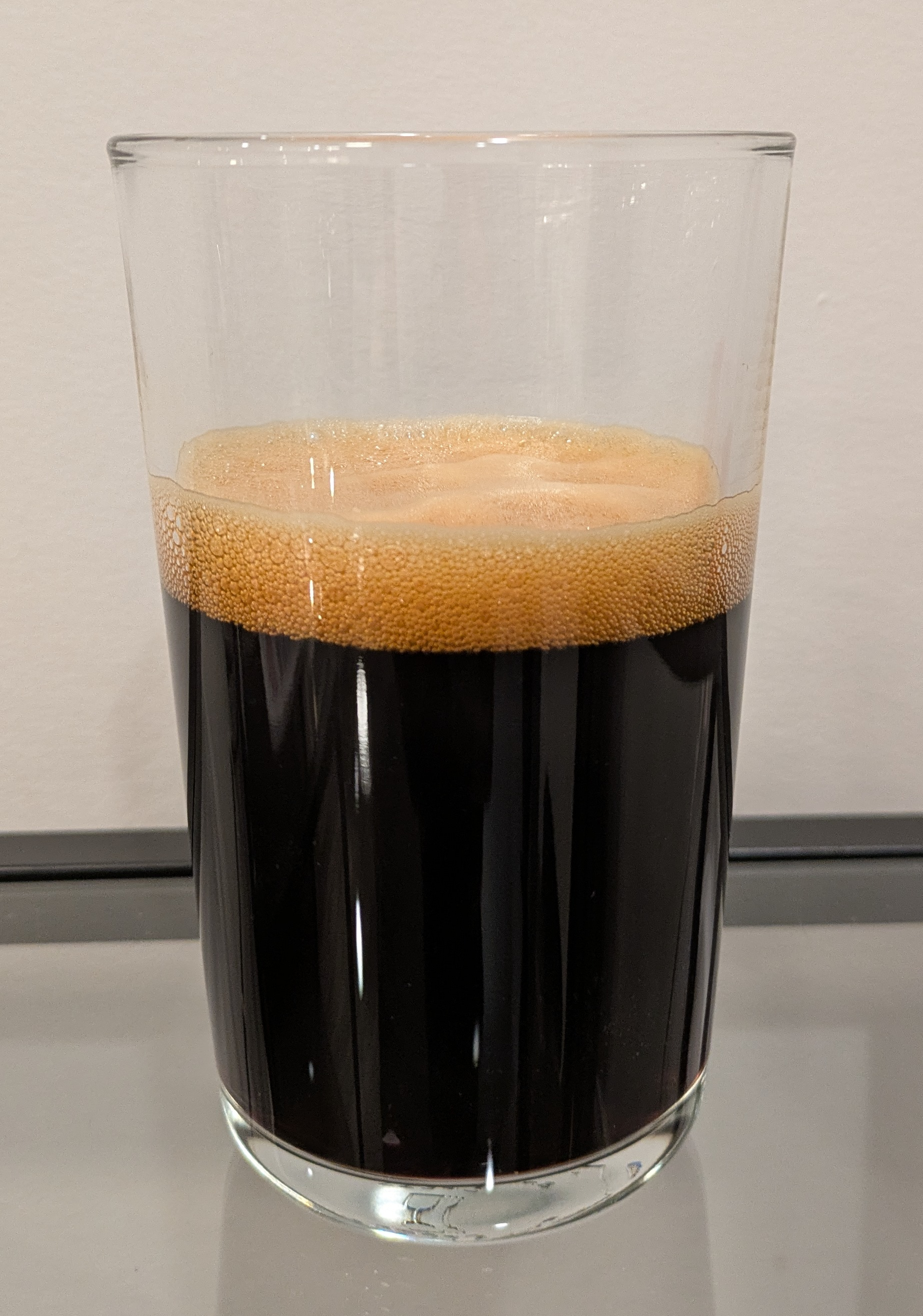
Malta Goya (PUR)

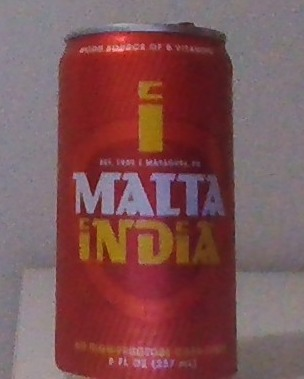
Malta India canned version (PUR)

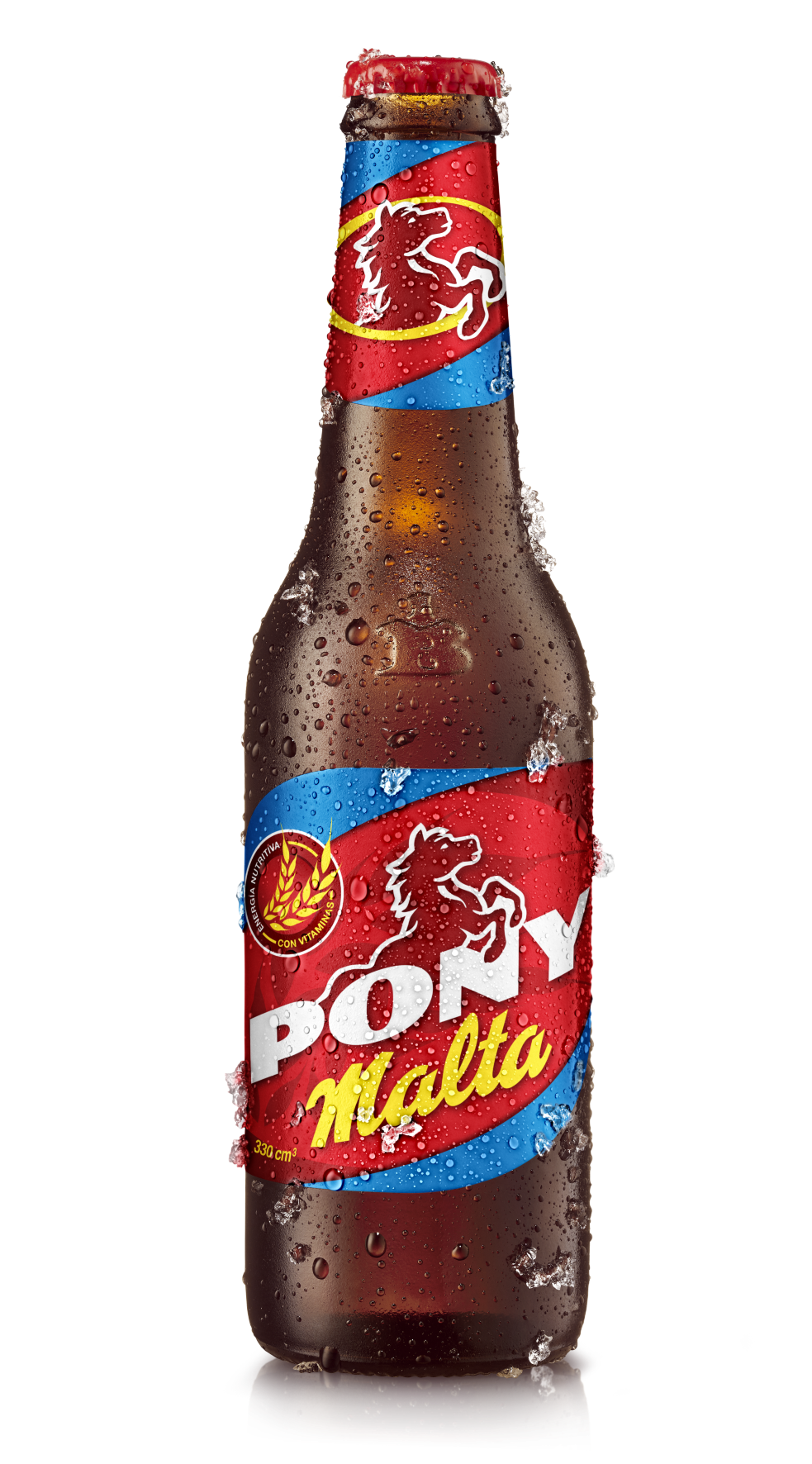
Pony Malta Bavaria (COL)

== See also ==
- Malt beer
- List of barley-based beverages
- Low-alcohol beer
  - Root beer
- Malt syrup
- Vitamalt
