= Blanco (surname) =

Blanco is a surname of Spanish origin, meaning "white". Notable people with the surname include:

== General ==
- Ana Blanco (born 1963), Spanish journalist and newscaster
- Andrea Blanco-Redondo, Spanish optical engineer and physicist
- Andrés Eloy Blanco, Venezuelan poet and politician
- Antonio Blanco (painter), Filipino painter
- Antonio Blanco Freijeiro (1923–1991), Spanish archeologist and historian
- Augustin Blanco (1700–1725), Spanish pirate active in the Caribbean
- Bartolomé Blanco (1914–1936), Spanish Catholic martyr
- Billy Blanco (1924–2011), Brazilian architect, musician, composer and writer
- Carlos Blanco (writer) (born 1986), Spanish writer
- Carmen Blanco y Trigueros (ca. 1840–1921), Spanish writer, poet, and journalist
- Eduardo Blanco (actor), Spanish-Argentine actor
- Eduardo Blanco (writer), Venezuelan writer and politician
- Eduardo Blanco Amor, Galician Spanish writer and journalist
- Griselda Blanco, Colombian drug lord
- Herminio Blanco Mendoza, Mexican economist
- Jackie Lou Blanco (born 1964), Filipina actress
- Jorge Blanco (disambiguation), several people
- José Blanco (cigar industrialist), Dominican cigar businessman
- Joseph Blanco White, Spanish theologian and poet
- Lua Blanco (1987–2026), Brazilian actress and singer
- Luis Blanco Lugo, Puerto Rican judge
- Manuel Blanco Ramos, Spanish friar and botanist whose standard author abbreviation is Blanco
- Pedro Blanco (slave trader) (1795–1854), Spanish slave trader
- Pedro Blanco López (1883–1919), Spanish pianist and academic
- Richard Blanco (born 1968), American poet
- Roberto Blanco (actor) (1903–1965), Argentine actor
- Rufino Blanco-Fombona, Venezuelan writer
- Shanira Blanco, Puerto Rican model and TV presenter
- Tomás Blanco (disambiguation), multiple people with the name
- Victor Manuel Blanco, Puerto Rican astronomer
- Yolanda Blanco (born 1954), Nicaraguan poet

== Music ==
- Benny Blanco (born 1988), American musician
- Hugo Blanco (musician) (1940–2015), Venezuelan musician
- Juan Blanco (1919–2008), Cuban composer
- Morgan Blanco (1935–2021), Colombian accordionist
- Mykki Blanco (born 1986), American rapper
- Rico Blanco (born 1973), Filipino singer
- Roberto Blanco (born 1937), German singer

== Politicians ==
- Alex Blanco, Dominican-American politician
- Andrés Eloy Blanco, Venezuelan poet and politician
- Antonio Guzmán Blanco, Venezuelan politician and former president
- Carlos Blanco Galindo, interim president of Bolivia
- Daniel Blanco Acevedo, Uruguayan politician and former deputy for Montevideo
- Eduardo Blanco, Venezuelan history writer and politician
- Hugo Blanco (1934–2023), Peruvian politician
- José Blanco López (born 1962), Spanish politician
- José Luis Blanco Pajón, Mexican politician
- Juan Carlos Blanco Acevedo, Uruguayan politician and former foreign minister
- Juan Carlos Blanco Estradé, Uruguayan politician, former foreign minister, UN ambassador, and senator
- Juan Carlos Blanco Fernández, Uruguayan politician and former foreign minister
- José Luis Blanco Pajón (born 1956), Mexican politician
- Kathleen Blanco (1942–2019), United States politician and former governor of Louisiana
- Luis Carrero Blanco, Spanish politician and former prime minister
- Manuel Blanco Encalada, Chilean politician and vice-admiral
- Marco Antonio Garcia Blanco, Mexican diplomat
- Miguel Ángel Blanco, Spanish politician assassinated in 1997
- Oliver Blanco (born 1991), Venezuelan politician
- Otilio Ulate Blanco, Costa Rican politician and former president
- Pedro Blanco Soto, (1795–1829), President of Bolivia for one week
- Ramón Blanco y Erenas, Spanish governor of the Philippines and Cuba
- Raymond Blanco (1935–2022), American educator, First Gentleman of Louisiana
- Salvador Jorge Blanco (1926–2010), Dominican politician, writer and lawyer
- Víctor Blanco, Mexican official and politician
- Wilfrido Blanco, Costa Rican politician

== Sports ==
=== Association football ===
- Aitor Blanco, Spanish footballer
- Alberto Blanco (footballer), Panamanian footballer
- Alexia Blanco (born 2000), Spanish footballer
- Borja Blanco Gil, Spanish futsal player
- Carlos Blanco (footballer, born 1928), Spanish-Mexican footballer
- Carlos Blanco (footballer, born 1996), Spanish footballer
- Cuauhtémoc Blanco, Mexican footballer
- Daniel Blanco, Argentine footballer
- Daniel Blanco, Venezuelan footballer
- Elkin Blanco, Colombian footballer
- Ismael Blanco, Argentine footballer
- Kepa Blanco, Spanish footballer
- Jonathan Blanco, Argentine footballer
- Juan Carlos Blanco (footballer, born 1946), Uruguayan football player and manager
- Juan José Blanco, Uruguayan footballer
- Léster Blanco, Salvadoran footballer
- Manuel Blanco Rodríguez, Spanish footballer
- Mauro Blanco, Bolivian footballer
- Ramón Blanco Rodríguez, Spanish footballer
- Raul Blanco, Argentine football coach
- Rubén Blanco Veiga, Spanish footballer
- Richard José Blanco, Venezuelan footballer
- Sebastián Blanco, Argentine footballer
- Sergio Blanco, Uruguayan footballer
- Raúl González Blanco, Spanish footballer

=== Baseball ===
- Andrés Eloy Blanco, Venezuelan baseball player
- Dairon Blanco, Cuban baseball player
- Dámaso Blanco, Venezuelan baseball player
- Gregor Blanco, Venezuelan baseball player
- Henry Blanco, Venezuelan baseball player
- Ossie Blanco, Venezuelan baseball player
- Ronel Blanco, Dominican baseball player
- Tony Blanco, Dominican baseball player

=== Cycling ===
- David Blanco, Spanish cyclist
- Julio César Blanco, Venezuelan cyclist

=== Judo ===
- Cecilia Blanco, Spanish judoka
- Oiana Blanco, Spanish judoka
- Giovanna Blanco, Venezuelan judoka

=== Track & field ===
- José Luis Blanco, Spanish athlete
- Marvin Blanco, Venezuelan athlete

=== Volleyball ===
- Juan Carlos Blanco, Venezuelan volleyball player

=== Others ===
- Alfonso Blanco (boxer), Venezuelan boxer
- Galo Blanco, Spanish tennis player
- Isabel Blanco, Norwegian handball player
- Jesús Blanco, Argentine wrestler
- Lorena Blanco, Peruvian badminton player
- Maribel Blanco, Spanish triathlete
- Maximo Blanco, Venezuelan martial artist
- Saúl Blanco, Spanish basketball player
- Serge Blanco, Venezuelan French rugby union player
