= Cárdenas (surname) =

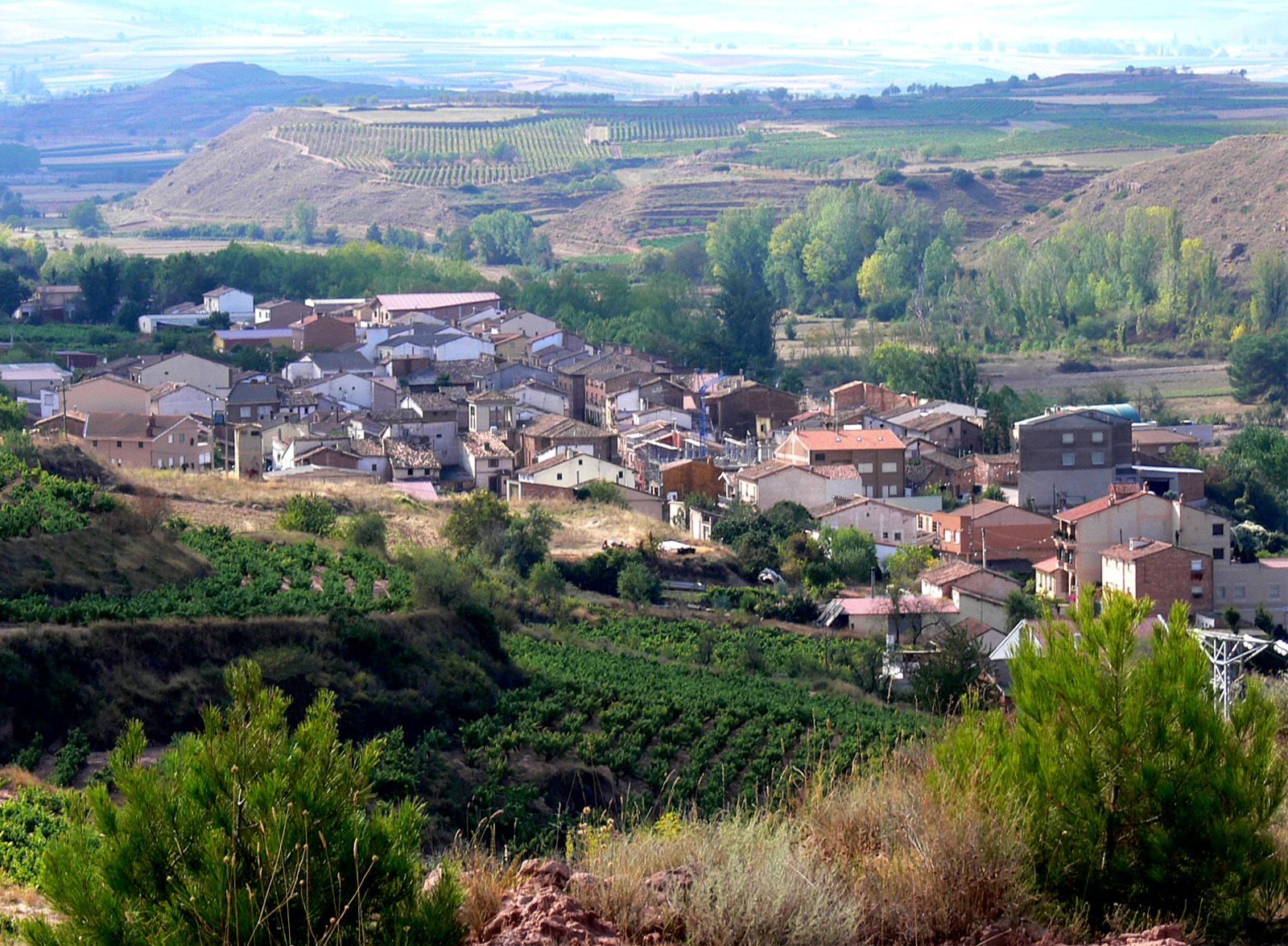
- Cárdenas, La Rioja, Spain
- Pronunciation: ˈkarðɛˌnas

Origin
- Language: Spanish
- Meaning: Thistle (Carduus)
- Region of origin: Spain

Other names
- Variant forms: Cardenas, de Cárdenas, Cárdena, Carden, Cardo, Cardenoza, Cardeño, Barcenas

Cárdenas is a locational surname originating in La Rioja, Spain. In Spain, Cárdenas is the 287th most frequently surname, accounting for 0.37% of the population. It is the 296th most popular surname in the Spanish autonomous community of Catalonia.

== Etymology ==
This habitational surname derives from places named Cárdenas in the provinces of Almería, in Andalusia, and Logroño, in La Rioja. It comes from the feminine plural of cárdeno, meaning "blue" or "bluish purple", by way of the Latin cardinus, from carduus ("thistle").

== People ==
- Adán Cárdenas (1836–1916), President of Nicaragua
- Adrian Cardenas (born 1987), American baseball player
- Agustín Cárdenas (1927–2001), Cuban sculptor
- Alberto Cárdenas (born 1958), Mexican politician
- Alejandro Cárdenas (born 1974), Mexican athlete
- Alicia Cárdeñas (born 1943), Mexican volleyball player
- Alonso de Cárdenas (fl. 1474–1493), Spanish noble
- Alonso de Cárdenas, Spanish ambassador to the English Commonwealth (1650s)
- Anahí de Cárdenas (born 1983), Peruvian singer and actress
- Bartolomé de Cárdenas (1440–1501), Spanish painter, better known as Bartolomé Bermejo
- Bartolomé de Cárdenas (1575–1628), Spanish painter, born in Portugal
- Brenda Cardenas Thomae (born 1982), Mexican politician and lawyer
- Carlos Cárdenas (born 1976), Bolivian footballer
- Cuauhtémoc Cárdenas (born 1934), Mexican politician
- Eliécer Cárdenas (1950–2021), Ecuadorian writer
- Félix Cárdenas (born 1973), Colombian cyclist
- Francisco Arias Cárdenas (born 1950), Venezuelan politician
- García López de Cárdenas (fl. 1540), Spanish Conquistador
- Gregorio Cárdenas Hernández (1915–1999), Mexican serial killer
- Gustavo Cárdenas Gutiérrez (born 1958), Mexican Politician
- Henry Cárdenas (born 1965), Colombian road cyclist
- Jose Cardenas (born 1970), California real life character portrayed in McFarland, USA film
- Juan Cárdenas, several people
- Lázaro Cárdenas Batel (born 1964), Mexican politician
- Lázaro Cárdenas del Río (1895–1970), President of Mexico
- Leo Cárdenas (born 1938), Cuban baseball player
- Luis Cárdenas (cyclist) (born 1967), Colombian cyclist
- Luis Cárdenas (footballer) (born 1993), Mexican footballer
- Luis Cárdenas Saavedra, Venezuelan educator
- Marco Cárdenas (born 1955), Venezuelan engraver
- Martín Cárdenas (botanist) (1899–1973), Bolivian botanist
- Martín Cárdenas (motorcycle racer) (born 1982), Colombian motorcyclist
- Mauricio Cárdenas Santa María (born 1962), Colombian politician
- Micha Cárdenas (born 1977), American artist and theorist
- Miguel Cárdenas (fl. 1894–1904), Mexican politician
- Osiel Cárdenas (born 1967), Mexican drug baron
- Raúl Cárdenas (1928–2016), Mexican footballer and coach
- Regla Cárdenas (born 1975), Cuban heptathlete
- Raymundo Cárdenas (born 1950), Mexican politician
- Robert Cardenas (1920–2022), American general
- Sherman Cárdenas (born 1989), Colombian football midfielder
- Steve Cardenas (born 1974), American martial artist, musician and retired actor
