= Marco (given name) =

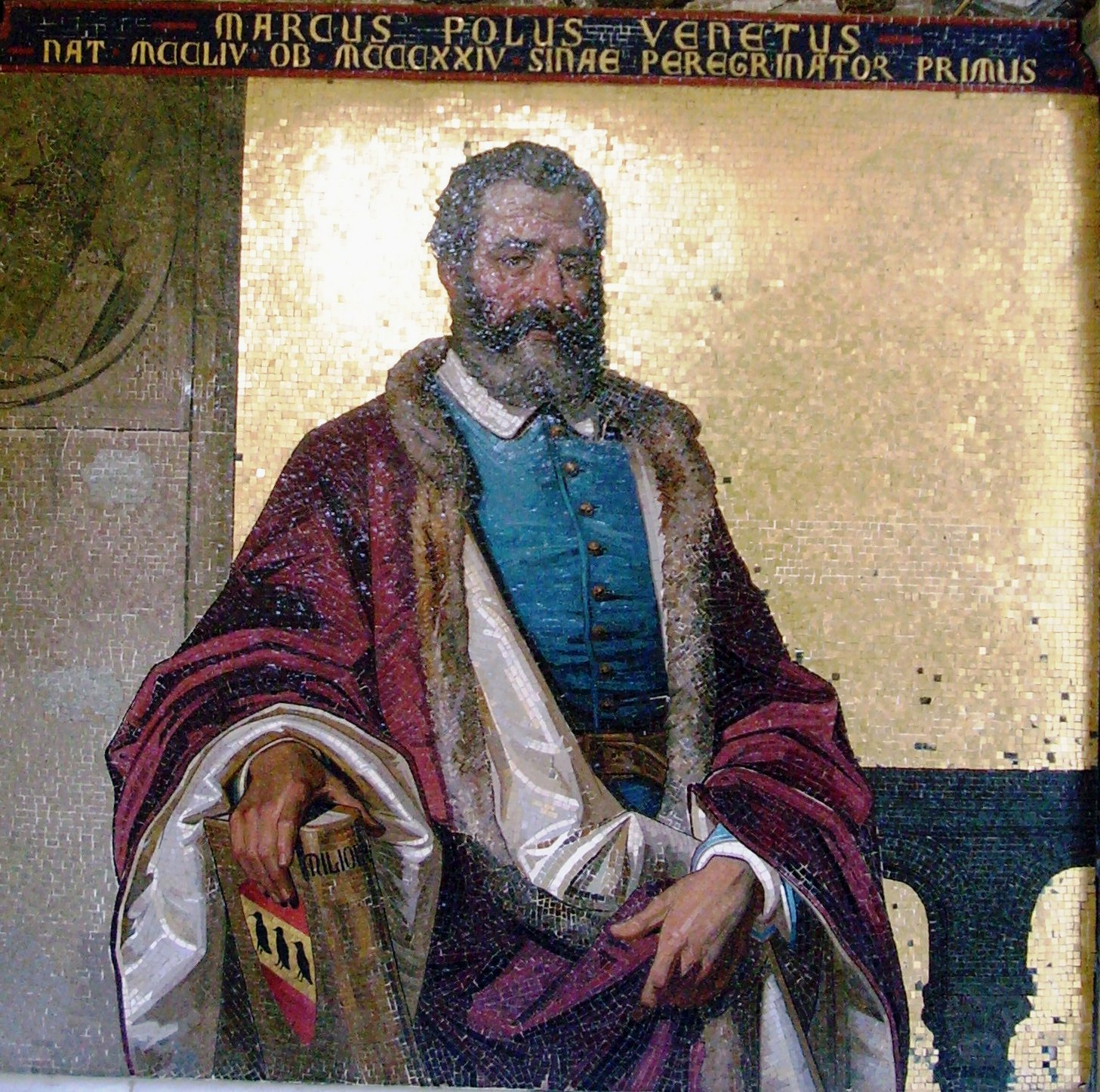
- Marco Polo
- Pronunciation: Italian: [ˈmarko]
- Gender: Male
- Language: Italian
- Name day: April 25

Origin
- Origin: Latin: Marcus, Etruscan: Maris, German: marah
- Meaning: "Warlike, Warring, Mars, Roman God of War"
- Region of origin: Italy

Other names
- Related names: Marc (French), Marcas (Irish), Marcos (Portuguese, Spanish), Marcu (Romanian), Marek (West Slavic), Mark (English), Márk (Hungarian), Markku (Finnish), Marko (South Slavic), Markos (Greek), Markus, Mark (German, Scandinavian), Martin
- See also: Marcello

Marco is an Italian masculine given name of Etruscan and Latin origin, derived from Marcus. It derives from the Roman god Mars.

== A–L ==
- Marco Alcaraz (born 1983), Filipino actor and model
- Marco Alessandrini (born 1970), Italian politician
- Marco Amelia (born 1982), Italian footballer
- Marco Amenta (born 1970), Italian director and producer
- Marco Andreolli (born 1986), Italian footballer
- Marco Andretti (born 1987), American racing driver
- Marco Arment (born 1982), American web developer
- Marco Asensio (born 1996), Spanish footballer
- Marco Avellaneda (1813–1841), Argentine politician
- Marco Ballini (born 1998), professional footballer in Thailand
- Marco Banderas (born 1967), Spanish singer, actor
- Marco Antonio Barrera (born 1974), Mexican boxer
- Marco Antonio Barrero (born 1962), Bolivian footballer
- Marco van Basten (born 1964), Dutch footballer
- Marco Belinelli (born 1986), Italian basketball player
- Marco Berger (born 1977), Argentine film director
- Marco Bertaiolli (born 1968), Brazilian politician
- Marco Biagianti (born 1984), Italian footballer
- Marco Boogers (born 1967), Dutch footballer
- Marco Borgnino (born 1997), Argentine footballer
- Marco Borriello (born 1982), Italian footballer
- Marco Borsato (born 1966), Dutch singer
- Marco Brambilla (born 1966), Italian-born Canadian artist and filmmaker
- Marco Bülow (1971–2026), German journalist and politician
- Marco Calliari, Canadian singer
- Marco Campese (born 1980), Italian footballer
- Marco Antonio Caponi (born 1983), Argentine actor
- Marco Cárdenas (born 1955), Venezuelan engraver
- Marco Casambre (born 1998), Filipino professional footballer
- Marco Cassetti (born 1977), Italian footballer
- Marco Castro (born 1976), Peruvian-American film director, actor
- Marco Cheung (born 1999), Hong Kong professional footballer
- Marco Chiudinelli (born 1981), Swiss tennis player
- Marco Cicchetti (born 1999), Italian para athlete
- Marco D'Amore (born 1981), Italian actor
- Marco Dapper (born 1983), American actor and model
- Marco Delvecchio (born 1973), Italian footballer
- Marco Denevi (1922–1998), Argentine writer
- Marco Di Cesare (born 2002), Argentine footballer
- Marco Di Vaio (born 1976), Italian footballer
- Marco Donnarumma, Italian artist
- Marco Essimi (born 1999), Cameroonian footballer
- Marco Ferradini (born 1949), Italian pop-rock singer
- Marco Fu (born 1978), Hong Kong snooker player
- Marco Antonio Garcia Blanco (born 1960), Mexican diplomat
- Marco Giampaolo (born 1967), Italian football coach
- Marco Gonzales (born 1992), American baseball player
- Marco Grazzini, Canadian actor
- Marco Gumabao (born 1994), Filipino actor, model, and athlete
- Marco Hahnfeld (born 1988), German politician
- Marco Hangl (born 1967), Swiss alpine skier
- Marco Heide (born 1988), German politician
- Marco Heinis (born 2003), French Nordic combined skier
- Marco Hietala (born 1966), Finnish bassist and singer
- Marco Höger (born 1989), German footballer
- Marco Iacobellis (born 1999), Argentine footballer
- Marco Ilsø (born 1994), Danish actor
- Marco Ip, Hong Kong singer
- Marco Jaggi (born 1980), Swiss wrestler known as Ares
- Marco Jones (born 2006), American football player
- Marco Khan (born 1961), Iranian actor
- Marco Kreuzpaintner (born 1977), German film director and screenwriter
- Marco Kurz (born 1969), German football manager
- Marco Kwok (born 1988), Hong Kong professional cyclist
- Marco Leonardi (born 1971), Italian actor

== M–Z ==
- Marco Maciel (1940–2021), Vice President of Brazil from 1995 to 2003
- Marco Maia (born 1965), Brazilian politician
- Marco Mak (born 1951), Hong Kong film director and editor
- Marco Marzocca (born 1962), Italian actor and comedian
- Marco Masa (born 2007), Filipino child/current teen actor
- Marco Masini (born 1964), Italian pop singer
- Marco Materazzi (born 1973), Italian footballer
- Marco Antonio Mazzini, Peruvian clarinetist
- Marco Melandri (born 1982), Italian motorcycle racer
- Marco Mengoni (born 1988), Italian pop singer
- Marco Micone (born 1945), Italian-Canadian playwright and journalist
- Marco Minnemann (born 1970), German drummer
- Marco Misciagna (born 1984), Italian violist and violinist
- Marco Morales (born 1982), television and film actor in the Philippines
- Marco Morales (American football) (born 1962), US American football player
- Marco Motta (born 1986), Italian footballer
- Marco Nanini (born 1948), Brazilian Actor
- Marco Ngai (born 1967), actor in Hong Kong
- Marco Pantani (1970–2004), Italian road racing cyclist
- Marco Paolini (born 1956), Italian stage actor
- Marco Pappa (born 1987), Guatemalan footballer
- Marco Parolo (born 1985), Italian footballer
- Marco Pastors (born 1965), Dutch politician
- Marco Pellegrino (born 2002), Argentine footballer
- Marco Pigossi (born 1989), Brazilian actor
- Marco Piqué (born 1980), Surinamese-Dutch welterweight kickboxer
- Marco Antonio Pogioli (born 1975), Brazilian footballer
- Marco Polo (1254–1324), Venetian trader and explorer
- Marco Raya (born 2002), American baseball player
- Marco Reus (born 1989), German footballer
- Marco Rojas (born 1991), New Zealand footballer
- Marco Rosa (born 1982), Canadian ice hockey player
- Marco Rossi (ice hockey) (born 2001), Austrian ice hockey player
- Marco Ruben (born 1986), Argentine footballer
- Marco Rubio (born 1971), Cuban American US Secretary of State
- Marco Antonio Rubio (born 1980), Mexican boxer
- Marco Ruffo, Italian architect
- Marco Scacchi, Italian composer
- Marco Scutaro (born 1975), baseball player
- Marco Siffredi (1979–2002), French snowboarder and mountaineer
- Marco Silva (born 1977), Portuguese football manager and player
- Marco Simoncelli (1987–2011), Italian motorcycle racer
- Marco Simone (born 1969), Italian footballer
- Marco Sison (born 1957), Filipino singer, actor, and politician
- Marco Solari (c. 1355–1405), Italian architect and engineer
- Marco Antonio Solís (born 1959), Mexican singer
- Marco Storari (born 1977), Italian footballer
- Marco Streller (born 1981), Swiss footballer
- Marco Tardelli (born 1954), Italian footballer
- Marco Thomas (born 1983), American football player
- Marco Torsiglieri (born 1988), Argentine footballer
- Marco Trungelliti (born 1990), Argentine tennis player
- Marco Van Hees (born 1964), Belgian politician
- Marco Venegas (born 1962), Swedish politician
- Marco Verratti (born 1992), Italian footballer
- Marco Völler (born 1989), German basketball player
- Marco Wegener (born 1995), Hong Kong professional footballer
- Marco Werner (born 1966), winner of Le Mans 2005 and 2006
- Marco Pierre White (born 1961), English chef
- Marco Wilson (born 1999), American football player
- Marco Wörgötter (born 2002), Austrian ski jumper
- Marco Zanchi (born 1977), Italian footballer
- Marco Zoppo (1433–1478), Italian painter

== Fictional ==
- Marco (Shaman King), a character of the manga Shaman King
- Marco Alessi, a character from the Neighbours
- Marco Axelbender, a character in the movie Cars
- Marco Jr, the main protagonist of the Indian film Marco (2024 film)
- Marco Del Rossi, a character from the Degrassi: The Next Generation series
- Marco Pasternak, a character in the TV series Better Call Saul
- Marco Rossi (Metal Slug), a protagonist of the Metal Slug series
- Marco Salamanca, a character in the TV series Breaking Bad and Better Call Saul
- Marco Super FAV18, a character in the movie Cars

== See also ==
- Marco (disambiguation)
