= Karl-Georg Wellmann =

German politician

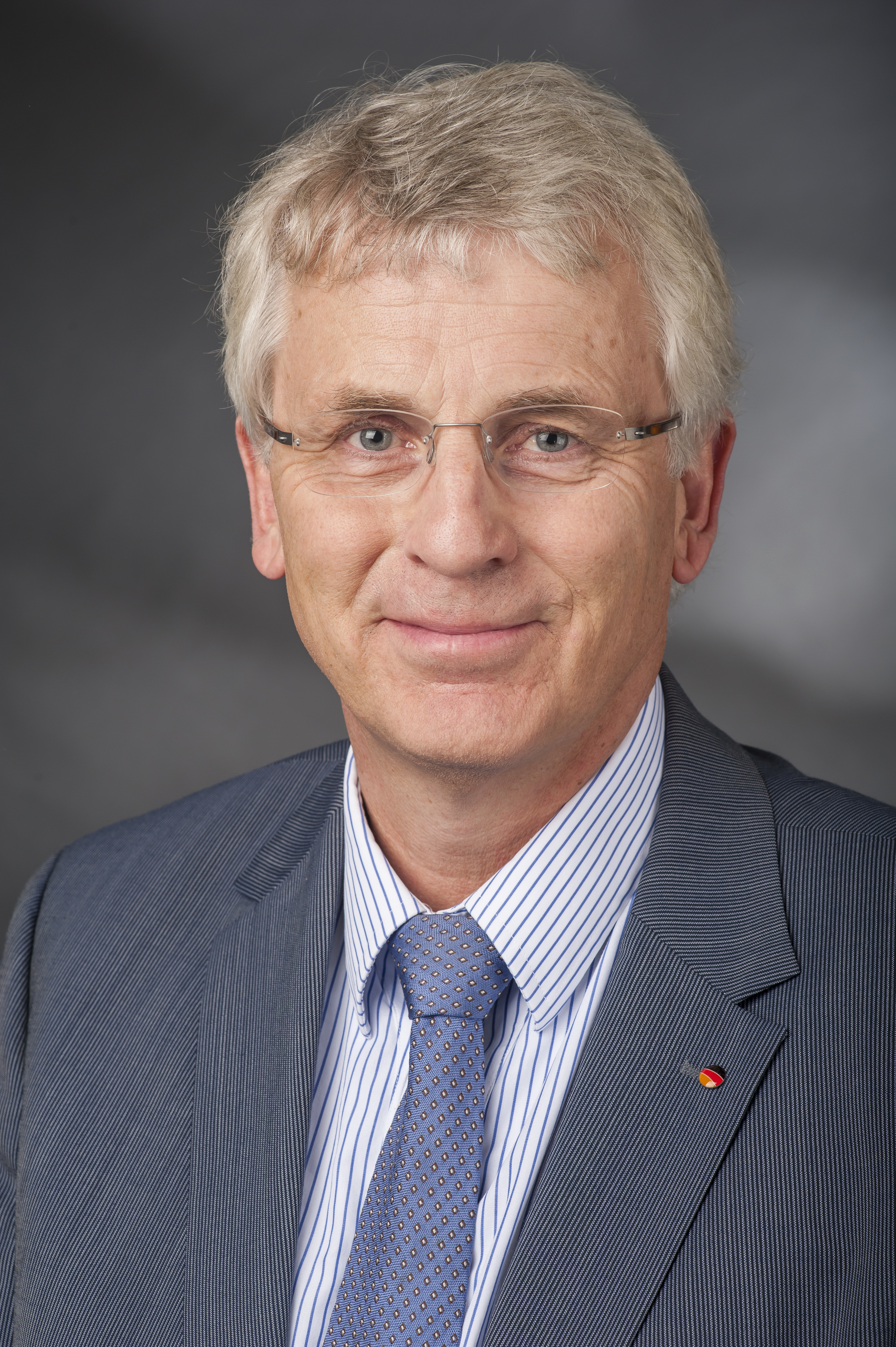
- Wellmann in 2014

Member of the Bundestag; for Berlin-Steglitz-Zehlendorf
- In office 18 October 2005 – 24 October 2017
- Preceded by: Klaus Uwe Benneter
- Succeeded by: Thomas Heilmann

Member of the; Berlin House of Representatives; for Steglitz-Zehlendorf 6
- In office October 2001 – October 2005
- Preceded by: Constituency established
- Succeeded by: Cerstin Richter-Kotowski

Personal details
- Born: 18 November 1952 (age 73) West Berlin, West Germany
- Party: Christian Democratic Union
- Children: 3
- Education: TU Berlin; Free University of Berlin
- Occupation: Lawyer

Karl-Georg Wellmann (born 18 November 1952) is a German politician of the Christian Democratic Union (CDU). From 2001 to 2005, he was member of the Abgeordnetenhaus, the state parliament of Berlin. Between 2005 and 2017, he was an MP of the German Bundestag.

== Education and early career ==
Wellmann was born in Berlin. After earning a high school diploma, Wellmann studied business administration and law at Technische Universität Berlin and the Free University of Berlin. In 1978, he completed the first, and, after being a referendary, in 1980 the second state examination in Berlin. He then worked as a lawyer. From 1981 to 1985, he was personal advisor of Senator Hanna-Renate Laurien, State Minister for Science and Research, in the government of Governing Mayor of West Berlin Richard von Weizsäcker. He later worked for the State Ministry for Health and Social Affairs. Since 1985, he has been a lawyer again, since 1997 a notary.

== Political career ==
In 2001, Wellmann was elected MP of the State Parliament of Berlin.

From 2005 on, Wellmann was a member of the German Bundestag; he won the seat for Steglitz-Zehlendorf directly and was re-elected there in 2009 and 2013.

In parliament, Wellmann was member of the Committee on Foreign Affairs from 2009. In addition to his committee assignment, he served as chairman of the German-Ukrainian Parliamentary Friendship Group. He was also a member of the German-Russian Parliamentary Friendship Group and the German-Belarus Parliamentary Friendship Group. A member of the German delegation to the Parliamentary Assembly of the Council of Europe (PACE), he also served on the Sub-Committee on relations with the Organisation for Economic Co-operation and Development (OECD) and the European Bank for Reconstruction and Development (EBRD).

Wellmann also was an OSCE election monitor in Ukraine. In May 2015, Russia refused his entry at Moscow airport until the year of 2019, though he had been officially invited by the Foreign Committee of the Russian Federation Council. This was strongly criticized by the German government.

== Other activities ==
- German-Ukrainian Forum, Deputy Chairman
- International Bar Association (IBA), Member
- Agency for the Modernisation of Ukraine (AMU), Member (2015)
- Transatlantic Leadership Academy (TLA), Member of the Board (2005–2009)
- United Nations Association of Germany (DGVN), Member of the Board (2005–2007)
