= Teofilo Folengo =

Italian macaronic poet

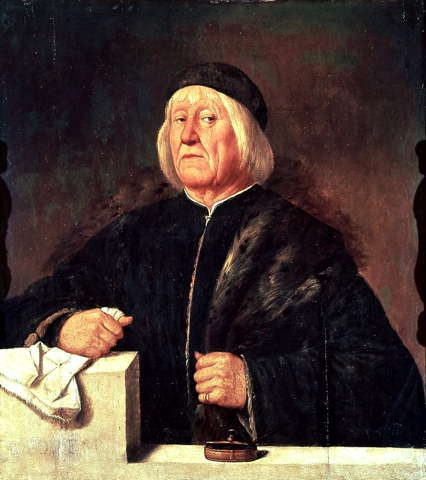
- Portrait of Teofilo Folengo by Romanino
- Born: Girolamo Folengo; 8 November 1491; Mantua, Margraviate of Mantua
- Died: 9 December 1544 (aged 53); Campese, Republic of Venice
- Resting place: Chiesa della Santa Croce (Campese)
- Other names: Merlino Coccajo; Merlinus Cocaius
- Occupations: Christian monk; Poet; Dramatist
- Parent(s): Federico Folengo and Paola Folengo (née Ghisi)
- Writing career
- Language: Italian, Latin
- Genres: Epic poetry; Drama
- Notable works: Opus macaronicum Baldus; Orlandino
- Literary movement: Italian Renaissance

Teofilo Folengo OSB (Italian pronunciation: [teˈɔːfilo foˈleŋɡo]; 8 November 1491 – 9 December 1544), who wrote under the pseudonym of Merlino Coccajo (Note: Or Cocajo or Cocaj) or Merlinus Cocaius in Latin, was one of the principal Italian macaronic poets.

== Biography ==
Folengo was born of noble parentage at Cipada near Mantua, Italy.

From his infancy he showed great vivacity of mind, and a remarkable cleverness in making verses. At the age of sixteen he entered the monastery of Sant'Eufemia near Brescia, and eighteen months afterwards he became a professed member of the Benedictine order.

For a few years his life as a monk seems to have been tolerably regular, and he is said to have produced a considerable quantity of Latin verse, written, not unsuccessfully, in the Virgilian style.

About the year 1516 he forsook the monastic life for the society of a well-born young woman named Girolama Dieda, with whom he wandered about the country for several years, often suffering great poverty, having no other means of support than his talent for writing.

Later in his life Folengo decided to return to the Church. After four years of penance in which he lived as a hermit, he was re-admitted to the order in 1534.

In 1538 he was sent to Sicily near Palermo, together with many others monks from Mantua. He spent in Sicily some of his later years, under the patronage of Ferrante Gonzaga, who served the emperor Charles V as Viceroy of Sicily (1535–1546).

He appears to have been based at the abbey of San Martino delle Scale (Monreale). In 1543 he retired to the Santa Croce monastery of Campese, near Bassano; and there he died on 9 December 1544.

== Famous works ==
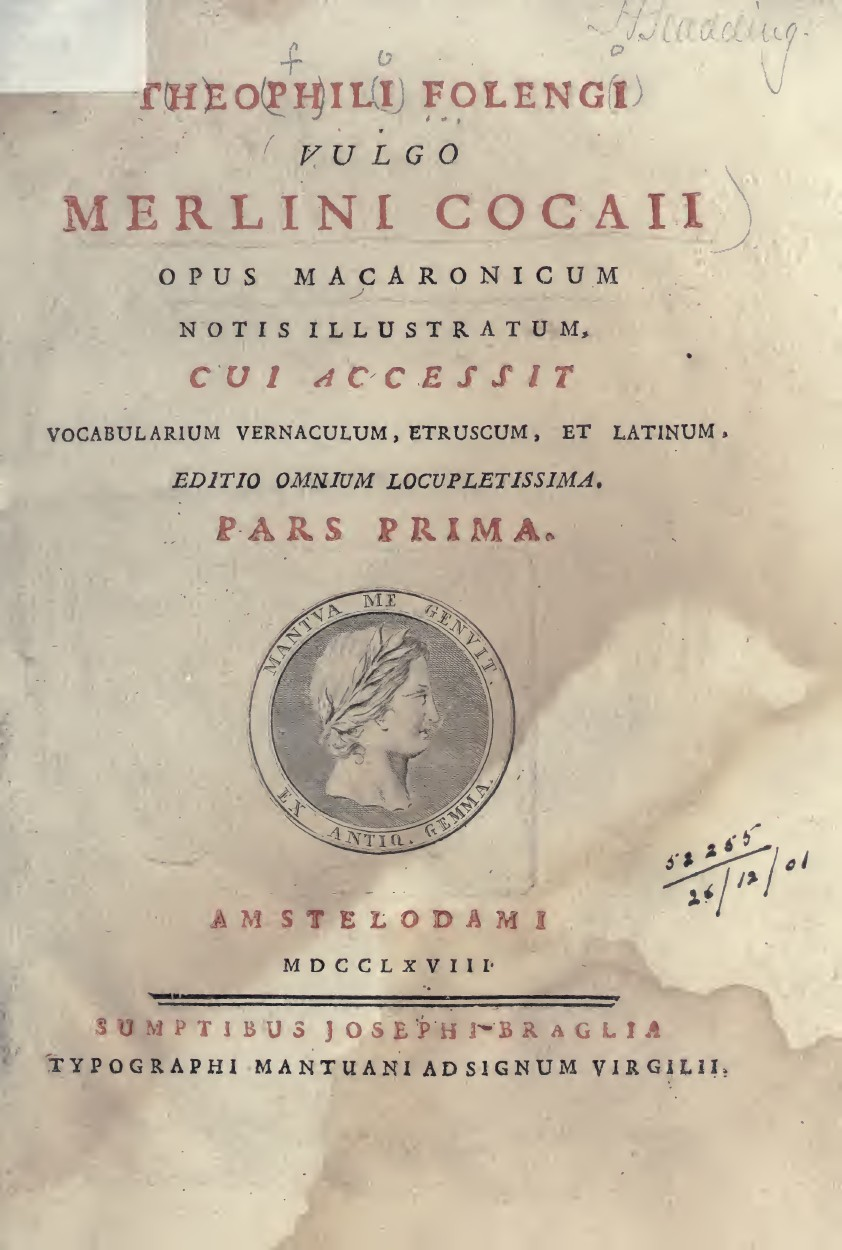
Maccheronee

His first work, under the Latin pseudonym Merlinus Cocaius, was the macaronic narrative poem Baldo (1517), which relates the adventures of a fictitious hero named Baldo ("Baldus"), a descendant of French royalty and something of a juvenile delinquent who encounters imprisonment; battles with local authorities, pirates, shepherds, witches, and demons; and a journey to the underworld.

Throughout his adventures Baldo is accompanied by various companions, among them a giant, a centaur, a magician, and his best friend Cingar, a trickster. Baldo blended Latin with various Italian dialects in hexameter verse.

Though frequently censured, it soon attained a wide popularity, and within a very few years passed through several editions and was later expanded by Folengo. (Note: The work was a model for Rabelais. An English translation was published for the first time in 2007 by Ann E. Mullaney as part of The I Tatti Renaissance Library.)

Folengo's next work was Orlandino, an Italian poem of eight cantos, written in rhymed octaves. It appeared in 1526, and bore on the title-page the new pseudonym of Limerno Pitocco (Merlin the Beggar) da Mantova.

In the same year, wearied with a life of dissipation, Folengo returned to his ecclesiastical roots; and shortly afterwards wrote his Caos del tri per uno, in which, partly in prose, partly in verse, sometimes in Latin, sometimes in Italian, and sometimes in macaronic, he gives a veiled account of the vicissitudes of the life he had lived under his various names.

We next find him about the year 1533 writing in rhymed octaves a life of Christ entitled L'Umanità del Figliuolo di Dio; and he is known to have composed, still later, another religious poem upon the creation, fall and restoration of man, besides a few tragedies. Folengo wrote also a sacra rappresentazione, the Atto della Pinta, which was repeatedly staged.

These, however, have never been published.

== English translations ==
- Teofilo Folengo (Author), Ann E. Mullaney (Translator). Baldo, Volume I, Books I-XII (The I Tatti Renaissance Library). Harvard University Press. ISBN 978-0-674-02521-9
- Teofilo Folengo (Author), Ann E. Mullaney (Translator). Baldo, Volume II, Books XIII-XXV (The I Tatti Renaissance Library). Harvard University Press. ISBN 978-0-674-03124-1

== Literature ==
- Panzini, Alfredo (1887). Saggio critico sulla poesia maccheronica. Castellammare di Stabia: Tipografia Elzeviriana.
- Piscini, Angela (1997). "FOLENGO, Teofilo". Dizionario Biografico degli Italiani (in Italian). Vol. 48: Filoni–Forghieri. Rome: Istituto dell'Enciclopedia Italiana. ISBN 978-88-12-00032-6.
- Colella, Massimo (2019). "«Sol d'Orlandin i' canto, e nondimeno…». Lettura dell''Orlandino' di Teofilo Folengo". Rivista di Letteratura Italiana. XXXVII (3): 9–29. doi:10.19272/201902203001.
