= Luis Cárdenas =

Luis Cárdenas may refer to:

- Luis Cárdenas (footballer), Mexican footballer
- Luis Cárdenas (cyclist), Colombian cyclist
- Luis Cardenas, American drummer with Renegade
- Luis Cárdenas Saavedra, Venezuelan educator
