= Steglitz-Zehlendorf 5 =

State electoral district of Germany

- Electoral district for the Berlin House of Representatives
- Steglitz-Zehlendorf 5 in 2026
- District: Steglitz-Zehlendorf
- Electorate: 30,171 (2026)

Current electoral district
- Party: CDU
- Member: Marco Hahnfeld

Steglitz-Zehlendorf 5 is an electoral constituency (German: Wahlkreis) represented in the House of Representatives of Berlin. It elects one member via first-past-the-post voting.

== Geography ==
The constituency comprises the areas of Leonorenstraße, Paul-Schneider-Straße, Kamenzer Damm, Gallwitzallee, Siemensstraße, and Marienplatz of the Lankwitz district, entirely within the borough of Steglitz-Zehlendorf.

There were 30,171 eligible voters in 2026.

== Members ==
Election	Member	Party	%
1999	Oliver Friederici	CDU	59.2
2001	Oliver Friederici	CDU	39.8
2006	Oliver Friederici	CDU	40.1
2011	Oliver Friederici	CDU	40.8
2016	Oliver Friederici	CDU	29.6
2021	Oliver Friederici	CDU	29.4
2023	Oliver Friederici	CDU	41.2
2026	Marco Hahnfeld	CDU	28.5

== Election results ==
=== 2026 election ===
State election (2026): Steglitz-Zehlendorf 5
Notes:	Blue background denotes the winner of the electorate vote. Pink background denotes a candidate elected from their party list. Yellow background denotes an electorate win by a list member, or other incumbent. A ✓ or ✗ denotes status of any incumbent, win or lose respectively.						
Party	Candidate	Votes	%	±%	Party votes	%	±%
CDU	Marco Hahnfeld	6,264	28.5	▼12.7	6,084	27.5	▼10.8
SPD	Mirjam Golm	3,692	16.8	▼4.5	3,403	15.4	▼5.2
AfD	Frank Päßler	3,524	16.0	▲8.1	3,460	15.6	▲7.4
Greens	Konstantinos Kosmas	3,393	15.4	▲0.7	2,822	12.7	▼0.7
Left	Kevin Kreis	3,070	14.0	▲9.9	3,495	15.8	▲10.9
FDP	Karoline Preisler	828	3.8	▼1.0	775	3.5	▼2.8
BSW	Wladimir Evdokimov	730	3.3		877	4.0	
Tierschutzpartei					527	2.4	▲0.1
Volt	Camilo Pedraza Jaramillo	470	2.1		426	1.9	▲1.2
PARTEI					121	0.5	▼0.4
PdF					83	0.4	
ÖDP					44	0.2	▲0.1
du.					19	0.1	▼0.1
DKP					9	0.0	
SGP					9	0.0	Steady
Informal votes		440			257		
Total valid votes		21,971			22,154		
Turnout		22,411	74.3	▲10.3			
CDU hold	Majority	2,572	11.7	▼8.2			

=== 2023 repeat election ===
Changes denoted below for the 2023 election are compared to the 2016 election, as the 2021 election was declared invalid.

State election (2023): Steglitz-Zehlendorf 5
Notes:	Blue background denotes the winner of the electorate vote. Pink background denotes a candidate elected from their party list. Yellow background denotes an electorate win by a list member, or other incumbent. A ✓ or ✗ denotes status of any incumbent, win or lose respectively.						
Party	Candidate	Votes	%	±%	Party votes	%	±%
CDU	✓ Oliver Friederici	7,732	41.2	▲11.6	7,201	38.3	▲11.8
SPD	Mirjam Golm	3,997	21.3	▼5.5	3,867	20.6	▼1.8
Greens	Konstantinos Kosmas	2,766	14.7	▲3.1	2,530	13.5	▲1.2
AfD	Felix Wolf	1,492	7.9	▼6.7	1,543	8.2	▼6.0
FDP	Claudia Bienek	891	4.7	▼3.6	1,185	6.3	▼3.4
Left	Jakob Oliver Lohße	764	4.1	▼2.2	923	4.9	▼1.8
Tierschutzpartei	Bert Stefan Rutkowsky	532	2.8		431	2.3	▼0.1
PARTEI	Max Kranemann	245	1.3		185	1.0	▼0.2
Volt					136	0.7	
dieBasis	Friedrich Glados	150	0.8		106	0.6	
Gray Panthers					96	0.5	▼0.8
FW	Regina Kühne	106	0.6		78	0.4	
Pirates	Michael Delfs	96	0.5	▼2.2	91	0.5	▼1.3
Team Todenhöfer					90	0.5	
The Grays					86	0.5	
Mieterpartei					51	0.3	
Verjüngungsforschung					46	0.2	▼0.2
du.					33	0.2	
Humanists					22	0.1	
Bildet Berlin!					18	0.1	
NPD					15	0.1	▼0.3
Klimaliste					15	0.1	
ÖDP					13	0.1	
SGP					9	0.0	Steady
DKP					6	0.0	Steady
The Pinks/Alliance 21					7	0.0	
Bergpartei, die ÜberPartei					6	0.0	
LKR					4	0.0	▼0.4
BüSo					2	0.0	▼0.1
Informal votes		18,771			18,796		
Total valid votes		160			139		
Turnout		18,946	64.0	▼4.6			
CDU hold	Majority	3,735	19.9				

=== 2021 election (annulled) ===
The election in 2021 was annulled and rerun in 2023.

State election (2021): Steglitz-Zehlendorf 5
Notes:	Blue background denotes the winner of the electorate vote. Pink background denotes a candidate elected from their party list. Yellow background denotes an electorate win by a list member, or other incumbent. A ✓ or ✗ denotes status of any incumbent, win or lose respectively.						
Party	Candidate	Votes	%	±%	Party votes	%	±%
CDU	✓ Oliver Friederici	6,493	29.4	▼0.3	5,764	26.0	▼0.5
SPD	Mirjam Golm	5,681	25.7	▼1.1	5,521	24.9	▲2.6
Greens	Konstantinos Kosmas	3,516	15.9	▲4.3	3,174	14.3	▲2.1
FDP	Claudia Bienek	1,803	8.2	▼0.2	2,184	9.9	▲0.1
AfD	Felix Wolf	1,628	7.4	▼7.3	1,682	7.6	▼6.6
Left	Jakob Oliver Lohße	1,046	4.7	▼1.5	1,232	5.6	▼1.1
Tierschutzpartei	Bert Stefan Rutkowsky	792	3.6		519	2.3	Steady
dieBasis	Friedrich Glados	369	1.7		287	1.3	
PARTEI	Max Kranemann	359	1.6		291	1.3	▲0.1
Volt					203	0.9	
Team Todenhöfer					202	0.9	
FW	Regina Kühne	283	1.3		182	0.8	
The Grays					160	0.7	
Gray Panthers					152	0.7	▼0.6
APT					122	0.6	
Pirates	Michael Delfs	134	0.6	▼2.1	92	0.4	▼1.4
Verjüngungsforschung					61	0.3	▼0.2
Humanists					61	0.3	
Klimaliste					59	0.3	
Mieterpartei					43	0.2	
Bildet Berlin!					32	0.1	
ÖDP					31	0.1	
du.					24	0.1	
NPD					21	0.1	▼0.3
DKP					10	0.0	Steady
LKR					9	0.0	▼0.4
BüSo					8	0.0	▼0.1
SGP					7	0.0	Steady
The Pinks/Alliance 21					6	0.0	
Bergpartei, die ÜberPartei					4	0.0	
Informal votes		319			267		
Total valid votes		22,104			22,143		
Turnout		22,444	75.7	▲7.1			
CDU hold	Majority	812	3.7				

== See also ==
- Politics of Berlin
- House of Representatives of Berlin
