= Thomas Heilmann =

German politician (born 1964)

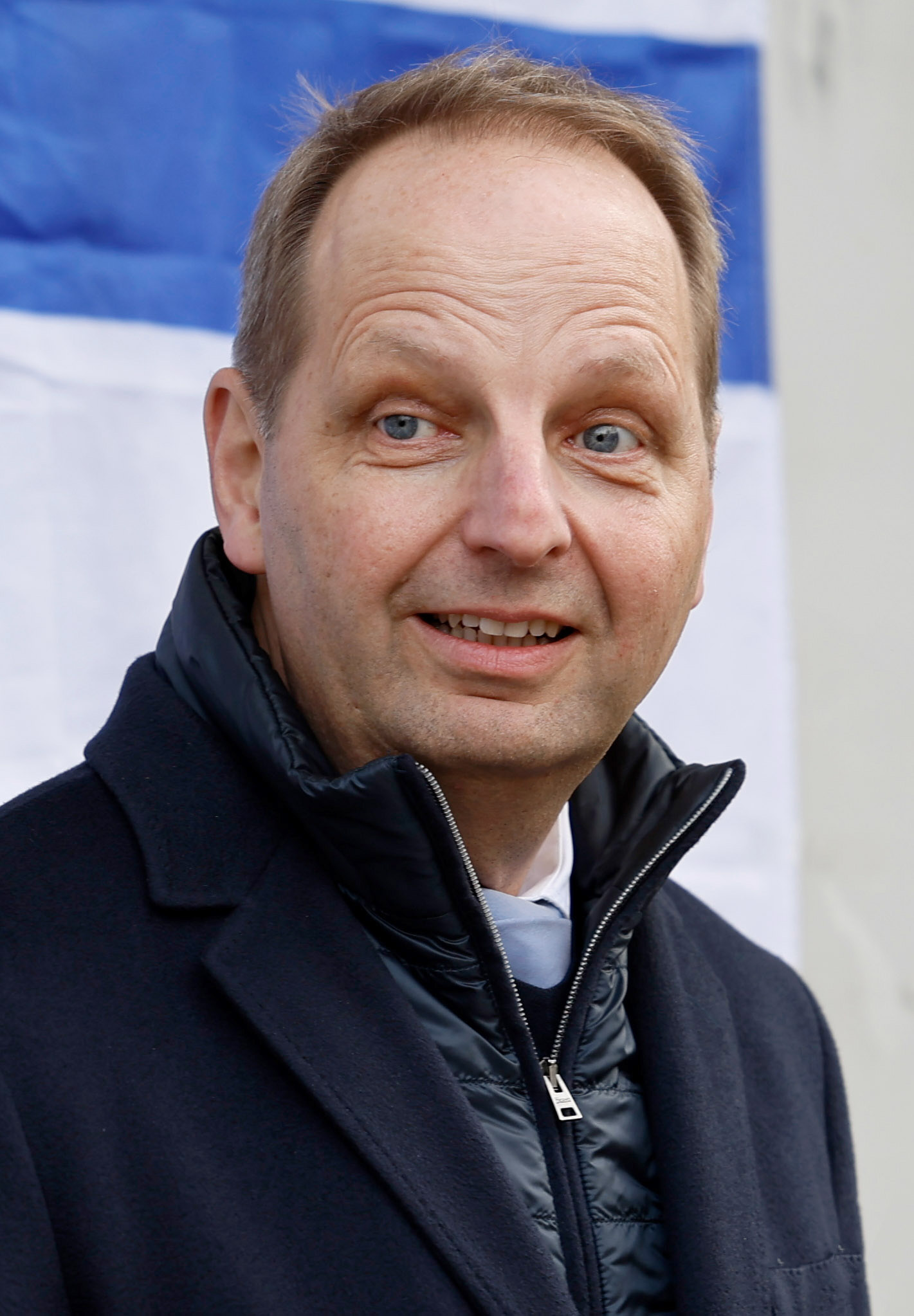
- Heilmann in 2023

Member of the Bundestag; for Berlin-Steglitz-Zehlendorf
- In office 24 October 2017 – 25 March 2025
- Preceded by: Karl-Georg Wellmann
- Succeeded by: Adrian Grasse

Senator for Justice and Consumer Protection of Berlin
- In office 12 January 2012 – 8 December 2016
- Governing Mayor: Klaus Wowereit; Michael Müller
- Preceded by: Mario Czaja
- Succeeded by: Dirk Behrendt

Personal details
- Born: 16 July 1964 (age 62) Dortmund, West Germany
- Party: Christian Democratic Union
- Children: 4

Thomas Heilmann (born 16 July 1964) is a German politician of the Christian Democratic Union (CDU). Born in Dortmund, North Rhine-Westphalia, he served as a member of the Bundestag from the state of Berlin from 2017 to 2025.

== Career in the private sector ==
From 2001 until 2008, Heilmann was a partner and CEO of Scholz & Friends. In 2001, he was nominated to join the supervisory board of Axel Springer SE; however, he was replaced by Axel Sven Springer before the vote.

At the request of Federal Minister of Labour and Social Affairs Ursula von der Leyen, Heilmann negotiated a high-profile agreement between investor Nicolas Berggruen and other shareholders on the sale of embattled department house chain Karstadt in 2010.

From 2011 until 2012, Heilmann briefly served as chair of the board at Save the Children Germany.

== Political career ==
=== Career in state government ===
From 2012 until 2016, Heilmann served as State Minister of Justice and Consumer Protection in the coalition governments of successive Governing Mayors of Berlin Klaus Wowereit (2012–2014) and Michael Müller (2014–2016).

In 2012, Heilmann – together fellow state ministers Mario Czaja and Frank Henkel – unsuccessfully advocated for a reduction in the penalty-free personal use of cannabis from 15 to six grams.

In the negotiations to form a Grand Coalition of Chancellor Angela Merkel's Christian Democrats (CDU together with the Bavarian CSU) and the Social Democrats (SPD) following the 2013 German elections, Heilmann was part of the CDU/CSU delegation in the working group on digital policy, led by Dorothee Bär and Brigitte Zypries.

In the 2016 state elections, Heilmann unsuccessfully ran for a seat in the State Parliament.

=== Member of the German Parliament (2017–2025) ===
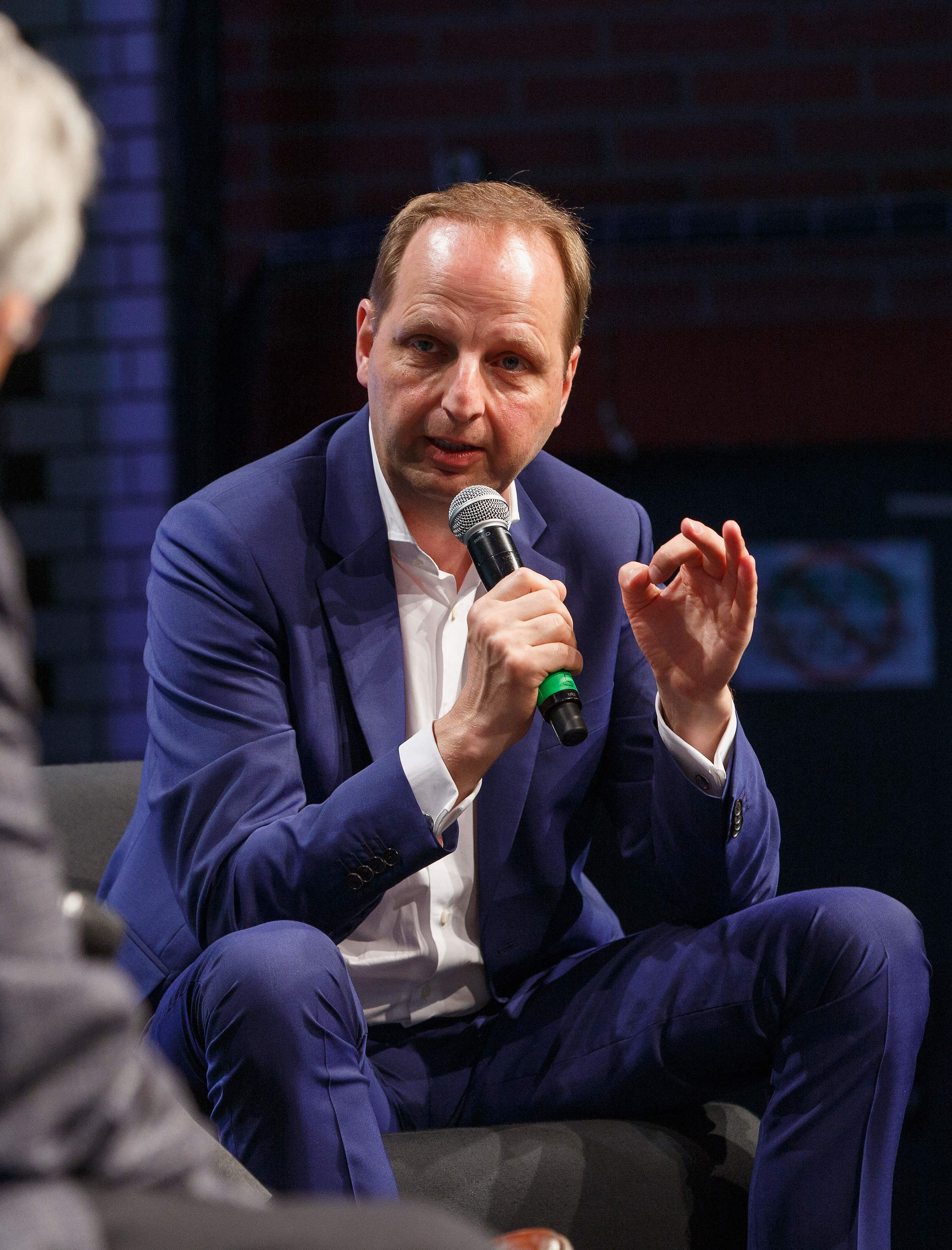
Heilmann in 2018

Heilmann became a member of the Bundestag in the 2017 German federal election, representing Berlin's Steglitz-Zehlendorf district. In parliament, he has served on the Committee on Labour and Social Affairs (2018–2021), the Committee on the Digital Agenda (2018–2021) and the Committee on Economic Affairs and Climate Action (since 2021). In his first term, he was his parliamentary group's rapporteur on blockchain.

Within the CDU/CSU parliamentary group, Heilmann has been leading the group of CDU parliamentarians from Berlin since 2021.

In the negotiations to form a coalition government between the CDU and the Social Democratic Party (SPD) under the leadership of Kai Wegner following Berlin's 2023 state elections, Heilmann was part of his party's delegation to the working group on mobility, climate action and environmental protection.

In July 2023, Heilmann made news headlines when the Federal Constitutional Court issued an injunction blocking parliament from considering a plan submitted by the government of Chancellor Olaf Scholz to encourage home owners to replace fossil fuel heating systems with cleaner alternatives. This way, the court ruled in favor of Heilmann's emergency petition in which he had argued that his rights as a lawmaker would be violated by it being pushed through without an opportunity for more detailed consideration.

== Other activities ==
=== Government agencies ===
- Federal Network Agency for Electricity, Gas, Telecommunications, Post and Railway (BNetzA), Alternate Member of the advisory board (since 2022)

=== Corporate boards ===
- BwConsulting, Member of the advisory board (since 2017)
- Scholz & Friends, Member of the supervisory board (2008–2010)
- Cision, Member of the Board of Directors (2007–2012)
- Deutsche Bank, Member of the advisory board (2003–2010)

=== Non-profit organizations ===
- Save the Children Germany, Member of the supervisory board (since 2016)
- betterplace.org, Member of the Advisory Board
- Museum Berggruen, Member of the International Council
- Save the Children International, Member of the Board of Trustees (2016–2018)
- Berlin School of Economics and Law (HWR), Member of the Board of Trustees

== Political positions ==
Ahead of the Christian Democrats' leadership election in 2018, Heilmann publicly endorsed Annegret Kramp-Karrenbauer to succeed Angela Merkel as the party's chair.

In January 2025, Heilmann was one of 12 CDU lawmakers who opted not to back a draft law on tightening immigration policy sponsored by their own leader Friedrich Merz, who had pushed for the law despite warnings from party colleagues that he risked being tarnished with the charge of voting alongside the far-right Alternative for Germany.
