= Juan Cárdenas =

Juan Cárdenas may refer to:

- Juan de Cárdenas (1563–1609), Spanish physician and scientist who worked in New Spain
- Juan Cárdenas (Jesuit) (1613–1684), Spanish theologian and author
- Juan Francisco de Cárdenas (1881–1966), Spanish diplomat
- Juan Cárdenas Arroyo (1939–2024), Colombian painter
- Juan Cárdenas Espinoza (born 1949), Ecuadorian politician, governor of Cañar
- Juan Cárdenas (writer) (born 1978), Colombian writer and translator
