= Campese =

Campese may refer to:

- David Campese (born 1962), rugby union player
- Marco Campese (born 1980), football midfielder
- Mike Campese, guitarist and composer
- Terry Campese (born 1984), rugby league player
- Campese is also a dialectal variant of Ribagorçan, an Aragonese language spoken in Campo, a town in the Spanish Pyrenees.
