= CF Balaguer =

Association football club in Spain

Balaguer
- Full name: Club de Futbol Balaguer
- Founded: 1945
- Ground: Municipal, Balaguer, Catalonia, Spain
- Capacity: 2,000
- President: Antonio Ayguadé
- Head coach: Josete
- League: Primera Catalana – Group 2
- 2024–25: Primera Catalana – Group 2, 8th of 16
Home colours	Away colours

Club de Futbol Balaguer is a Catalan Spanish football team based in Balaguer, in the autonomous community of Catalonia. Founded in 1945 it currently plays in Primera Catalana – Group 2, holding home games at Municipal de Balaguer, with a capacity of 2,000 seats. Balaguer was the last club local-born Roberto Martínez played for in Spain before moving to England. Roberto's father managed CF Balaguer in the eighties.

== History ==
Football first appeared in the city of Balaguer in 1916, when the students started to play each Thursday in the field near the current Municipal Theater.

== Season to season ==
Season	Tier	Division	Place	Copa del Rey
1945–46	5	1ª Reg. B	4th	
1946–47	5	2ª Reg.	5th	
1947–48	5	1ª Reg. B	6th	
1948–49	5	1ª Reg. B	3rd	
1949–50	4	1ª Reg.	14th	
1950–51	4	1ª Reg.	14th	
1951–52	6	2ª Reg.	4th	
1952–53	6	2ª Reg.	2nd	
1953–54	5	2ª Reg.	3rd	
1954–55	4	1ª Reg.	5th	
1955–56	4	1ª Reg.	12th	
1956–57	4	1ª Reg.	1st	
1957–58	3	3ª	14th	
1958–59	4	1ª Reg.	6th	
1959–60	4	1ª Reg.	3rd	
1960–61	3	3ª	11th	
1961–62	3	3ª	12th	
1962–63	3	3ª	16th	
1963–64	4	1ª Reg.	1st	
1964–65	3	3ª	5th	

Season	Tier	Division	Place	Copa del Rey
1965–66	3	3ª	6th	
1966–67	3	3ª	15th	
1967–68	4	1ª Reg.	12th	
1968–69	5	1ª Reg.	6th	
1969–70	5	1ª Reg.	13th	
1970–71	5	1ª Reg.	19th	
1971–72	6	2ª Reg.	1st	
1972–73	6	2ª Reg.	1st	
1973–74	5	1ª Reg.	16th	
1974–75	5	1ª Reg.	18th	
1975–76	6	2ª Reg.	13th	
1976–77	6	2ª Reg.	10th	
1977–78	7	2ª Reg.	1st	
1978–79	6	1ª Reg.	9th	
1979–80	6	1ª Reg.	13th	
1980–81	6	1ª Reg.	18th	
1981–82	6	1ª Reg.	5th	
1982–83	6	1ª Reg.	10th	
1983–84	6	1ª Reg.	8th	
1984–85	6	1ª Reg.	1st	

Season	Tier	Division	Place	Copa del Rey
1985–86	5	Reg. Pref.	4th	
1986–87	5	Reg. Pref.	4th	
1987–88	4	3ª	11th	
1988–89	4	3ª	15th	
1989–90	4	3ª	12th	
1990–91	4	3ª	1st	
1991–92	4	3ª	2nd	Second round
1992–93	4	3ª	8th	First round
1993–94	4	3ª	5th	
1994–95	4	3ª	7th	
1995–96	4	3ª	7th	
1996–97	4	3ª	18th	
1997–98	5	1ª Cat.	1st	
1998–99	4	3ª	5th	
1999–2000	4	3ª	1st	
2000–01	4	3ª	2nd	First round
2001–02	4	3ª	13th	
2002–03	4	3ª	20th	
2003–04	5	1ª Cat.	3rd	
2004–05	4	3ª	7th	

Season	Tier	Division	Place	Copa del Rey
2005–06	4	3ª	9th	
2006–07	4	3ª	8th	
2007–08	4	3ª	10th	
2008–09	4	3ª	16th	
2009–10	4	3ª	9th	
2010–11	4	3ª	15th	
2011–12	4	3ª	12th	
2012–13	4	3ª	20th	
2013–14	5	1ª Cat.	13th	
2014–15	5	1ª Cat.	10th	
2015–16	5	1ª Cat.	3rd	
2016–17	5	1ª Cat.	3rd	
2017–18	5	1ª Cat.	11th	
2018–19	5	1ª Cat.	18th	
2019–20	6	2ª Cat.	10th	
2020–21	6	2ª Cat.	1st	
2021–22	7	2ª Cat.	1st	
2022–23	6	1ª Cat.	15th	
2023–24	8	2ª Cat.	1st	
2024–25	7	1ª Cat.	8th	

Season	Tier	Division	Place	Copa del Rey
2025–26	7	1ª Cat.		

- 31 seasons in Tercera División

== Current squad ==
As of 22 December 2018

Note: Flags indicate national team as defined under FIFA eligibility rules; some limited exceptions apply. Players may hold more than one non-FIFA nationality.

No.	Pos.	Nation	Player
1	GK	ESP	Alfred Peguero
2	DF	ESP	Aleix Llusà
3	DF	ESP	Xavier Gabernet
5	DF	ESP	Joan Martínez
6	MF	ESP	Víctor Darias
7	MF	ESP	Hichem Boumedol
8	MF	ESP	Carlos Martínez
9	FW	ESP	Joan Vendrell
10	FW	GHA	Obed Nii
12	MF	ESP	Dorin Takacs
13	GK	ESP	Marc Aceituno

No.	Pos.	Nation	Player
14	FW	ESP	Sergi Galcerán
15	MF	ESP	Pau Solanes
16	DF	ESP	Robert Font
17	DF	ESP	Marcel Ormo
18	DF	ESP	Rubén Egea
19	DF	ESP	Jordi Jordana
20	DF	ESP	Lluís Roqué
21	FW	ESP	Xavier Gomà
22	MF	ESP	Marc Sánchez
23	MF	ESP	Eric Trota
24	DF	ESP	Ramon Rueda

== Notable players ==
- (Andorra) Koldo Álvarez
- (Portugal) Nuno Carvalho
- (Spain) Roberto Martínez
- (Spain) Ibán Parra
- (Uruguay) Juan José Blanco
- (Wales) Chad Bond
- (Wales) Kerry Morgan
- (Burkina Faso) Aristide Bancé
