= Nina Stahr =

German politician (born 1982)

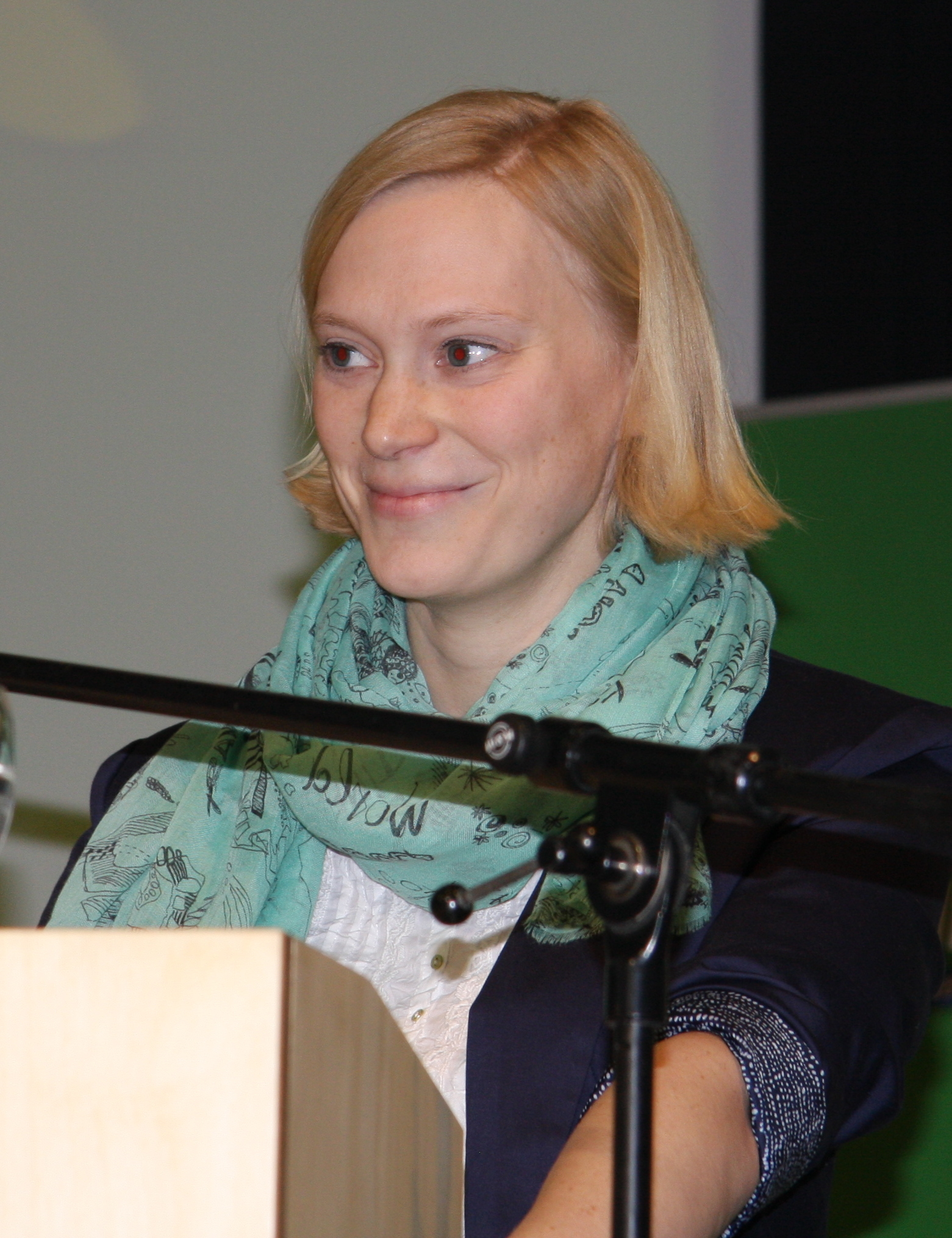
- Stahr in 2013

Member of the Bundestag
- In office 26 October 2021 – 2024
- Succeeded by: Franziska Krumwiede-Steiner

Personal details
- Born: 27 October 1982 (age 43) Frankfurt am Main, West Germany
- Party: Alliance 90/The Greens
- Education: Goethe University Frankfurt

Nina Stahr (born 27 October 1982) is a German politician of the Alliance 90/The Greens party who served as a member of the Bundestag from the 2021 elections until 2024, representing the Berlin-Steglitz-Zehlendorf district.

== Political career ==
Stahr became a member of the Alliance 90/The Greens party in 2006. From 2016 to 2021, she served as co-chair of the Green Party in Berlin.

In 2020, Stahr wrote the book Die Krise ist weiblich.

In parliament, Stahr served on the Committee for Education, Research and Technology Assessment and the Committee on Family Affairs, Senior Citizens, Women and Youth. In addition to her committee assignments, she was part of the German-British Parliamentary Friendship Group and the German-Irish Parliamentary Friendship Group.

== Other activities ==
- Stiftung Lesen, Member of the Board of Trustees (since 2022)
