= Saulo Pedroso =

Brazilian politician (born 1983)

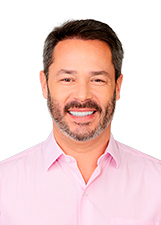
- Pedroso in 2024

Member of the Chamber of Deputies
- Incumbent
- Assumed office 3 October 2023
- Preceded by: Marco Bertaiolli
- Constituency: São Paulo

Personal details
- Born: 21 January 1983 (age 43)
- Party: Social Democratic Party (since 2020)

Saulo Pedroso de Souza (born 21 January 1983) is a Brazilian politician serving as a member of the Chamber of Deputies since 2023. From 2013 to 2020, he served as mayor of Atibaia., city where he was born. He is, now in 2026, candidate to State of São Paulo's Deputies by the number 5515.
