= Berlin-Steglitz-Zehlendorf =

Federal electoral district of Germany

78 Berlin-Steglitz-Zehlendorf
- Electoral district for the Bundestag
- Berlin-Steglitz-Zehlendorf in 2025
- State: Berlin
- Population: 293,900 (2019)
- Electorate: 217,814 (2021)
- Area: 102.6 km^{2}

Current electoral district
- Created: 1990
- Party: CDU
- Member: Adrian Grasse
- Elected: 2025

Berlin-Steglitz-Zehlendorf is an electoral constituency (German: Wahlkreis) represented in the Bundestag. It elects one member via first-past-the-post voting. Under the current constituency numbering system, it is designated as constituency 78. It is located in southwestern Berlin, comprising the Steglitz-Zehlendorf borough.

Berlin-Steglitz-Zehlendorf was created for the inaugural 1990 federal election after German reunification. Since 2025, it has been represented by Adrian Grasse of the Christian Democratic Union (CDU).

== Geography ==
Berlin-Steglitz-Zehlendorf is located in southwestern Berlin. As of the 2021 federal election, it is coterminous with the Steglitz-Zehlendorf borough.

== History ==
Berlin-Steglitz-Zehlendorf was created after German reunification in 1990. In the 1990 election, it was constituency 252 in the numbering system. In the 1994 and 1998 elections, it was number 253. In the 2002 through 2009 elections, it was number 80. In the 2013 through 2021 election, it was number 79. From the 2025 election, it has been number 78.

Originally, the constituency comprised the boroughs of Steglitz and Zehlendorf, excluding the area of Steglitz east of the Teltow Canal, specifically the locality of Lankwitz and part of Lichterfelde. In the 1994 and 1998 elections, it comprised the entirety of Steglitz and Zehlendorf boroughs. Since their merger ahead of the 2002 election, it has been coterminous with the Steglitz-Zehlendorf borough.

== Members ==
The constituency was first represented by Gero Pfennig of the Christian Democratic Union (CDU) from 1990 to 1998. It was won by the Social Democratic Party (SPD) in 1998 and represented by Renate Rennebach until 2002, followed by Klaus Uwe Benneter until 2005. Karl-Georg Wellmann of the CDU was elected in 2005, and re-elected in 2009 and 2013. He was succeeded by fellow CDU member Thomas Heilmann in the 2017 election. He retired ahead of the 2025 election and Adrian Grasse retained the seat for the CDU.

| Election | Member | Party | % |
|---|---|---|---|
| 1990 | Gero Pfennig | CDU | 51.7 |
| 1994 | Gero Pfennig | CDU | 47.5 |
| 1998 | Renate Rennebach | SPD | 42.7 |
| 2002 | Klaus Uwe Benneter | SPD | 40.8 |
| 2005 | Karl-Georg Wellmann | CDU | 40.0 |
| 2009 | Karl-Georg Wellmann | CDU | 38.8 |
| 2013 | Karl-Georg Wellmann | CDU | 42.5 |
| 2017 | Thomas Heilmann | CDU | 35.4 |
| 2021 | Thomas Heilmann | CDU | 28.0 |
| 2025 | Adrian Grasse | CDU | 30.7 |

== Election results ==
=== 2025 election ===
Federal election (2025): Berlin-Steglitz-Zehlendorf
| Notes: | Blue background denotes the winner of the electorate vote. Pink background denotes a candidate elected from their party list. Yellow background denotes an electorate win by a list member, or other incumbent. A ✓ or ✗ denotes status of any incumbent, win or lose respectively. | | | | | | |
| Party | Candidate | Votes | % | ±% | Party votes | % | ±% |
|---|---|---|---|---|---|---|---|
| CDU | Adrian Grasse | 55,398 | 30.7 | ▲2.1 | 48,500 | 26.8 | ▲3.3 |
| SPD | Ruppert Stüwe | 40,355 | 22.4 | ▼2.0 | 32,989 | 18.2 | ▼5.8 |
| Greens | Nina Stahr | 39,843 | 22.1 | ▼0.2 | 35,848 | 19.8 | ▼2.9 |
| AfD | Peer Döhnert | 18,539 | 10.3 | ▲4.8 | 18,678 | 10.3 | ▲4.4 |
| Left | Marcus Otto | 15,823 | 8.8 | ▲4.5 | 20,722 | 11.4 | ▲6.7 |
| FDP | Hanns-Henning Krumrey | 7,382 | 4.1 | ▼4.7 | 10,750 | 5.9 | ▼6.3 |
| BSW | | | | | 7,070 | 3.9 | New |
| Tierschutzpartei | | | | | 2,207 | 1.2 | ▼1.7 |
| Volt | | | | | 1,719 | 0.9 | ▲0.3 |
| PARTEI | | | | | 816 | 0.5 | ▼0.5 |
| FW | Stephan Weiß | 1,905 | 1.1 | ▲0.2 | 656 | 0.4 | ▼0.4 |
| Team Todenhöfer | | | | | 334 | 0.2 | ▼0.4 |
| PdF | | | | | 303 | 0.2 | New |
| BD | Anna Schäfer | 944 | 0.5 | New | 257 | 0.1 | New |
| MERA25 | | | | | 125 | 0.1 | New |
| BüSo | | | | | 38 | 0.0 | 0.0 |
| MLPD | | | | | 26 | 0.0 | 0.0 |
| SGP | | | | | 26 | 0.0 | 0.0 |
| Informal votes | | 1,694 | | | 819 | | |
| Total valid votes | | 180,189 | | | 181,064 | | |
| Turnout | | 181,883 | 84.7 | ▲5.7 | | | |
| CDU hold | Majority | 15,043 | 8.3 | ▲4.2 | | | |

=== 2021 election ===
Federal election (2021): Berlin-Steglitz-Zehlendorf
| Notes: | Blue background denotes the winner of the electorate vote. Pink background denotes a candidate elected from their party list. Yellow background denotes an electorate win by a list member, or other incumbent. A ✓ or ✗ denotes status of any incumbent, win or lose respectively. | | | | | | |
| Party | Candidate | Votes | % | ±% | Party votes | % | ±% |
|---|---|---|---|---|---|---|---|
| CDU | ✓ Thomas Heilmann | 48,949 | 28.0 | ▼7.4 | 39,943 | 22.9 | ▼6.9 |
| SPD | Ruppert Stüwe | 43,465 | 24.9 | ▲0.3 | 42,910 | 24.5 | ▲5.4 |
| Greens | Nina Stahr | 38,873 | 22.2 | ▲9.5 | 39,550 | 22.6 | ▲8.4 |
| FDP | Hanns-Henning Krumrey | 15,967 | 9.1 | ▲0.1 | 22,208 | 12.7 | ▼1.5 |
| AfD | Birgit Malsack-Winkemann | 9,221 | 5.3 | ▼2.9 | 9,915 | 5.7 | ▼3.2 |
| Left | Marcus Otto | 7,455 | 4.3 | ▼3.2 | 8,311 | 4.8 | ▼4.4 |
| Tierschutzpartei | Laura Höll | 3,874 | 2.2 | | 3,430 | 2.0 | ▲0.9 |
| PARTEI | Erik Westmann | 2,039 | 1.2 | ▼0.9 | 1,699 | 1.0 | ▼0.2 |
| dieBasis | Claus-Henning Hacker | 1,912 | 1.1 | | | | |
| FW | Klaus-Peter von Lüdeke | 1,430 | 0.8 | | 1,388 | 0.8 | ▲0.6 |
| Die Grauen | | | | | 1,214 | 0.7 | ▲0.4 |
| Volt | | | | | 1,139 | 0.7 | |
| Team Todenhöfer | | | | | 1,065 | 0.6 | |
| Pirates | Georg Boroviczény | 705 | 0.4 | | 589 | 0.3 | 0.0 |
| Gesundheitsforschung | Karl-Friedrich Harter | 439 | 0.3 | | 359 | 0.2 | ▲0.1 |
| ÖDP | Alina Sahl | 370 | 0.2 | | 296 | 0.2 | 0.0 |
| Humanists | | | | | 264 | 0.2 | |
| du. | | | | | 167 | 0.1 | 0.0 |
| V-Partei3 | | | | | 123 | 0.1 | ▼0.1 |
| LKR | Carsten Schanz | 111 | 0.1 | | 85 | 0.0 | |
| NPD | | | | | 64 | 0.0 | |
| DKP | | | | | 58 | 0.0 | 0.0 |
| BüSo | | | | | 51 | 0.0 | 0.0 |
| SGP | | | | | 27 | 0.0 | 0.0 |
| MLPD | | | | | 14 | 0.0 | 0.0 |
| Informal votes | | 2,421 | | | 2,372 | | |
| Total valid votes | | 174,820 | | | 174,869 | | |
| Turnout | | 177,241 | 81.4 | ▼0.3 | | | |
| CDU hold | Majority | 5,494 | 3.1 | ▼7.7 | | | |

=== 2017 election ===
Federal election (2017): Berlin-Steglitz-Zehlendorf
| Notes: | Blue background denotes the winner of the electorate vote. Pink background denotes a candidate elected from their party list. Yellow background denotes an electorate win by a list member, or other incumbent. A ✓ or ✗ denotes status of any incumbent, win or lose respectively. | | | | | | |
| Party | Candidate | Votes | % | ±% | Party votes | % | ±% |
|---|---|---|---|---|---|---|---|
| CDU | Thomas Heilmann | 63,085 | 35.4 | ▼7.1 | 53,281 | 29.8 | ▼7.4 |
| SPD | Ute Finckh-Krämer | 43,801 | 24.6 | ▼4.7 | 34,279 | 19.2 | ▼6.4 |
| Greens | Urban Aykal | 22,712 | 12.7 | ▲0.9 | 25,361 | 14.2 | ▲0.6 |
| FDP | Hartmut Ebbing | 16,159 | 9.1 | ▲6.4 | 25,461 | 14.2 | ▲7.9 |
| AfD | Sabine Gollombeck | 14,549 | 8.2 | ▲3.9 | 15,824 | 8.8 | ▲3.5 |
| Left | Franziska Brychcy | 13,392 | 7.5 | ▲2.2 | 16,352 | 9.1 | ▲2.0 |
| PARTEI | Alina Kranzosch | 3,681 | 2.1 | ▲1.3 | 2,143 | 1.2 | ▲0.5 |
| Tierschutzpartei | | | | | 1,846 | 1.0 | |
| Pirates | | | | | 651 | 0.4 | ▼2.1 |
| Die Grauen | | | | | 609 | 0.3 | |
| DiB | | | | | 496 | 0.3 | |
| BGE | | | | | 456 | 0.3 | |
| DIE FRAUEN | Christine Kuhlmann | 439 | 0.2 | | | | |
| ÖDP | | | | | 389 | 0.2 | 0.0 |
| FW | | | | | 332 | 0.2 | ▼0.1 |
| DM | | | | | 296 | 0.2 | |
| Gesundheitsforschung | | | | | 274 | 0.2 | |
| V-Partei³ | | | | | 268 | 0.1 | |
| Menschliche Welt | | | | | 240 | 0.1 | |
| du. | | | | | 212 | 0.1 | |
| BüSo | Stephan Ossenkopp | 555 | 0.3 | ▼0.1 | 120 | 0.1 | 0.0 |
| MLPD | | | | | 58 | 0.0 | 0.0 |
| DKP | | | | | 55 | 0.0 | |
| B* | | | | | 35 | 0.0 | |
| SGP | | | | | 19 | 0.0 | 0.0 |
| Informal votes | | 2,347 | | | 1,763 | | |
| Total valid votes | | 178,373 | | | 178,957 | | |
| Turnout | | 180,720 | 81.7 | ▲1.9 | | | |
| CDU hold | Majority | 19,284 | 10.8 | ▼2.4 | | | |

=== 2013 election ===
Federal election (2013): Berlin-Steglitz-Zehlendorf
| Notes: | Blue background denotes the winner of the electorate vote. Pink background denotes a candidate elected from their party list. Yellow background denotes an electorate win by a list member, or other incumbent. A ✓ or ✗ denotes status of any incumbent, win or lose respectively. | | | | | | |
| Party | Candidate | Votes | % | ±% | Party votes | % | ±% |
|---|---|---|---|---|---|---|---|
| CDU | ✓ Karl-Georg Wellmann | 73,460 | 42.5 | ▲3.6 | 64,500 | 37.2 | ▲6.1 |
| SPD | Ute Finckh-Krämer | 50,540 | 29.2 | ▲2.4 | 44,371 | 25.6 | ▲5.4 |
| Greens | Nina Stahr | 20,416 | 11.8 | ▼4.3 | 23,487 | 13.5 | ▼5.8 |
| Left | Lampros Savvidis | 9,102 | 5.3 | ▼0.2 | 12,426 | 7.2 | 0.0 |
| AfD | Hans-Joachim Berg | 7,321 | 4.2 | | 9,257 | 5.3 | |
| FDP | Martin Lindner | 4,605 | 2.7 | ▼6.2 | 11,057 | 6.4 | ▼10.6 |
| Pirates | Gerwald Claus-Brunner | 4,216 | 2.4 | | 4,358 | 2.5 | ▲0.3 |
| PARTEI | Martin Schippan | 1,276 | 0.7 | | 1,155 | 0.7 | |
| NPD | Josef Graf | 1,165 | 0.7 | ▼0.2 | 1,016 | 0.6 | ▼0.2 |
| FW | Burak Macit | 598 | 0.3 | | 552 | 0.3 | |
| ÖDP | | | | | 353 | 0.2 | 0.0 |
| PRO | | | | | 331 | 0.2 | |
| REP | | | | | 169 | 0.1 | ▼0.2 |
| BIG | | | | | 160 | 0.1 | |
| BüSo | Helga Zepp-LaRouche | 281 | 0.2 | ▼0.1 | 140 | 0.1 | ▼0.1 |
| MLPD | | | | | 55 | 0.0 | 0.0 |
| PSG | | | | | 50 | 0.0 | 0.0 |
| Informal votes | | 2,559 | | | 2,102 | | |
| Total valid votes | | 172,980 | | | 173,437 | | |
| Turnout | | 175,539 | 79.8 | ▲0.3 | | | |
| CDU hold | Majority | 22,920 | 13.3 | ▲1.3 | | | |

=== 2009 election ===
Federal election (2009): Berlin-Steglitz-Zehlendorf
| Notes: | Blue background denotes the winner of the electorate vote. Pink background denotes a candidate elected from their party list. Yellow background denotes an electorate win by a list member, or other incumbent. A ✓ or ✗ denotes status of any incumbent, win or lose respectively. | | | | | | |
| Party | Candidate | Votes | % | ±% | Party votes | % | ±% |
|---|---|---|---|---|---|---|---|
| CDU | ✓ Karl-Georg Wellmann | 66,075 | 38.8 | ▼1.2 | 53,085 | 31.1 | ▼0.9 |
| SPD | Klaus Uwe Benneter | 45,691 | 26.8 | ▼11.8 | 34,488 | 20.2 | ▼10.2 |
| Greens | Benedikt Lux | 27,392 | 16.1 | ▲6.1 | 33,004 | 19.3 | ▲3.4 |
| FDP | Rolf Breidenbach | 15,138 | 8.9 | ▲3.6 | 28,876 | 16.9 | ▲4.0 |
| Left | Olaf Ostertag | 9,325 | 5.5 | ▲1.6 | 12,270 | 7.2 | ▲2.0 |
| Pirates | | | | | 3,739 | 2.2 | |
| Tierschutzpartei | | | | | 1,860 | 1.1 | |
| NPD | Fritz Liebenow | 1,544 | 0.9 | ▼0.1 | 1,309 | 0.8 | 0.0 |
| Independent | Enno Munzel | 1,437 | 0.8 | | | | |
| FAMILIE | Jürgen Tartz | 1,416 | 0.8 | | | | |
| DIE VIOLETTEN | Ingrid Cölsch | 875 | 0.5 | | 623 | 0.4 | |
| Independent | Rainer Helmar Christiansen | 830 | 0.5 | | | | |
| REP | | | | | 472 | 0.3 | 0.0 |
| ÖDP | | | | | 312 | 0.2 | |
| BüSo | Silvia Heinel | 462 | 0.3 | ▼0.3 | 283 | 0.2 | 0.0 |
| DVU | | | | | 137 | 0.1 | |
| PSG | | | | | 79 | 0.0 | 0.0 |
| DKP | | | | | 36 | 0.0 | |
| MLPD | | | | | 34 | 0.0 | 0.0 |
| Informal votes | | 2,610 | | | 2,188 | | |
| Total valid votes | | 170,185 | | | 170,607 | | |
| Turnout | | 172,795 | 79.5 | ▼4.1 | | | |
| CDU hold | Majority | 20,384 | 12.0 | ▲10.7 | | | |

=== 2005 election ===
Federal election (2005):Berlin-Steglitz-Zehlendorf
| Notes: | Blue background denotes the winner of the electorate vote. Pink background denotes a candidate elected from their party list. Yellow background denotes an electorate win by a list member, or other incumbent. A ✓ or ✗ denotes status of any incumbent, win or lose respectively. | | | | | | |
| Party | Candidate | Votes | % | ±% | Party votes | % | ±% |
|---|---|---|---|---|---|---|---|
| CDU | Karl-Georg Wellmann | 70,874 | 40.0 | ▲1.6 | 56,937 | 32.0 | ▼3.3 |
| SPD | ✗ Klaus Uwe Benneter | 68,537 | 38.7 | ▼2.2 | 54,034 | 30.4 | ▼1.2 |
| Greens | Alice Ströver | 17,724 | 10.0 | 0.0 | 28,356 | 15.9 | ▼2.3 |
| FDP | Markus Löning | 9,358 | 5.3 | ▼2.1 | 23,027 | 12.9 | ▲3.3 |
| Left | Bärbel Holzheuer-Rothensteiner | 6,849 | 3.9 | ▲2.3 | 9,253 | 5.2 | ▲3.3 |
| GRAUEN | | | | | 2,739 | 1.5 | ▲0.8 |
| NPD | Horst Sinning | 1,696 | 1.0 | | 1,355 | 0.8 | ▲0.6 |
| Independent | Christoph Michalak | 1,166 | 0.7 | | | | |
| BüSo | Monika Hahn | 962 | 0.5 | ▲0.3 | 337 | 0.2 | ▲0.1 |
| REP | | | | | 579 | 0.3 | ▼0.1 |
| PARTEI | | | | | 537 | 0.3 | |
| Feminist | | | | | 490 | 0.3 | ▲0.1 |
| APPD | | | | | 105 | 0.1 | |
| SGP | | | | | 100 | 0.1 | |
| MLPD | | | | | 37 | 0.0 | |
| Informal votes | | 3,081 | | | 2,361 | | |
| Total valid votes | | 177,166 | | | 177,886 | | |
| Turnout | | 180,247 | 83.6 | ▼0.8 | | | |
| CDU gain from SPD | Majority | 2,337 | 1.3 | | | | |
