= Adrian Grasse =

German politician (born 1975)

Adrian Grasse MdB
- Grasse in 2017

Member of the Bundestag; for Berlin-Steglitz-Zehlendorf
- Incumbent
- Assumed office 25 March 2025
- Preceded by: Thomas Heilmann

Member of the; Berlin House of Representatives; for Steglitz-Zehlendorf 6
- In office 27 October 2016 – 30 April 2025
- Preceded by: Uwe Lehmann-Brauns
- Succeeded by: Marco Hahnfeld

Personal details
- Born: 20 January 1975 (age 51) West Berlin, West Germany
- Party: Christian Democratic Union (since 1993)
- Children: 2
- Education: Humboldt University of Berlin

Adrian Grasse (born 20 January 1975) is a German politician who was elected as a member of the Bundestag in 2025. From 2016 to 2025, he was a member of the Abgeordnetenhaus of Berlin.
