= Ibán Parra =

Spanish footballer

Personal information
- Full name: Ibán Parra López
- Date of birth: 18 October 1977 (age 49)
- Place of birth: Lleida, Catalonia, Spain
- Height: 1.85 m (6 ft 1 in)
- Position: Striker

Youth career
- Atlético Segre

Senior career*
Years	Team	Apps	(Gls)
1996–1998	Fraga		
1998–1999	Schio		
1999	Tampere United	31	(22)
1999–2000	Schio		
2000	Tampere United	15	(3)
2001–2003	Alcarràs		
2003–2008	Balaguer	125	(75)
2008–2009	Lleida	37	(4)
2009–2010	Balaguer	17	(4)
2010–2011	Rapitenca	33	(17)
2011–2012	Torreforta	29	(12)
2012–2014	Balaguer	66	(22)
2014	Santa Coloma	0	(0)
2014–2015	Balaguer	29	(9)
2015–2018	Santa Coloma		
- * Club domestic league appearances and goals

Ibán Parra López (born 18 October 1977) is a Spanish former footballer who played as a striker.
