= Ruppert Stüwe =

German politician (SPD)

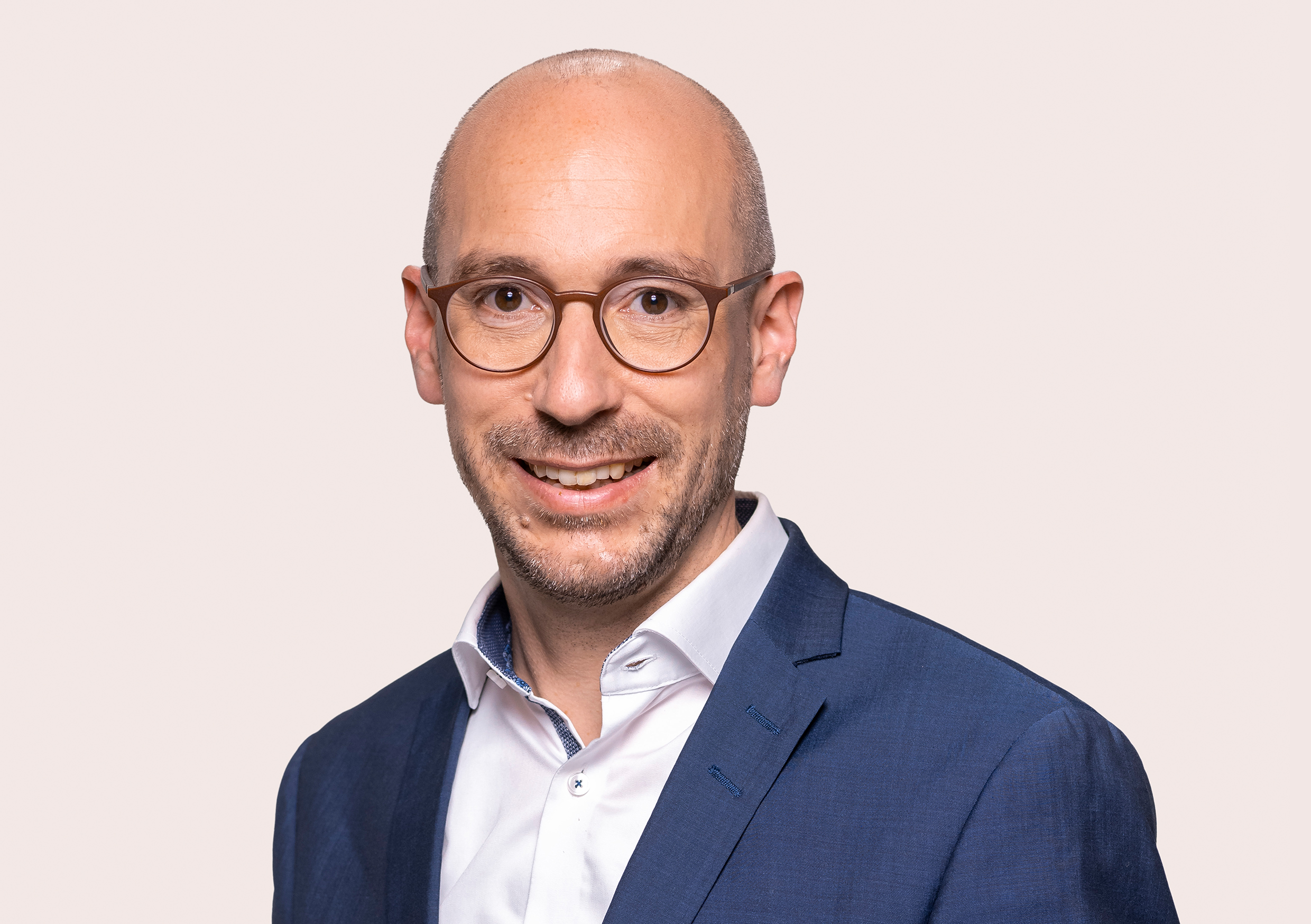
- Stüwe in 2021

Member of the Bundestag
- Incumbent
- Assumed office 2021

Personal details
- Born: 21 May 1978 (age 48) Berlin, Germany
- Party: SPD
- Education: University of Passau; Brno University of Technology; Free University of Berlin

Ruppert Stüwe (born 21 May 1978) is a German economist and politician of the Social Democratic Party (SPD) who has been serving as a member of the Bundestag since 2021.

== Early life and career ==
Stüwe was born in 1978 in Berlin and studied economics.

From 2011 to 2021, Stüwe worked for the Berliner Verkehrsbetriebe (BVG).

== Political career ==
Stüwe entered the SPD in 2006 and became a member of the Bundestag in 2021, representing the Berlin-Steglitz-Zehlendorf district.

In parliament, Stüwe has been serving on the Committee on Education, Research and Technology Assessment, the Committee on Petitions, the Subcommittee on Global Health.

Within his parliamentary group, Stüwe belongs to the Parliamentary Left, a left-wing movement.

In the negotiations to form a Grand Coalition under the leadership of Friedrich Merz's Christian Democrats (CDU together with the Bavarian CSU) and the SPD following the 2025 German elections, Stüwe was part of the SPD delegation in the working group on education, research and innovation, led by Karin Prien, Katrin Staffler and Oliver Kaczmarek.

== Other activities ==
- Institute for Federal Real Estate (BImA), Member of the supervisory board (since 2025)
- Ernst Reuter Foundation for Advanced Study, Member of the Board of Trustees (since 2025)
- German Network against Neglected Tropical Diseases (DNTDs), Member of the Parliamentary Advisory Board (since 2022)
