= Juan Cárdenas (Jesuit) =

Spanish Jesuit moral theologian (1613–1684)

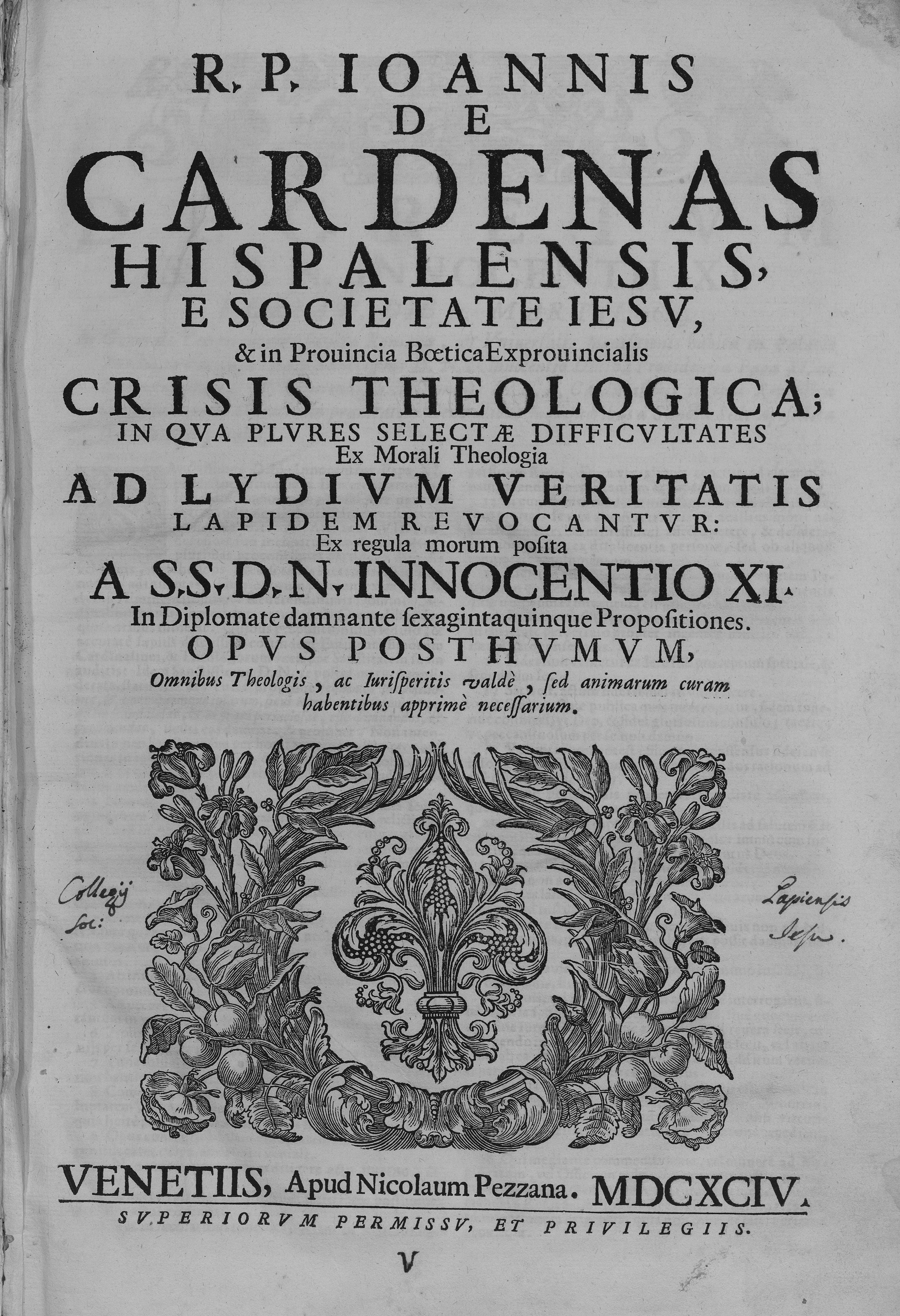
Crisis theologica, 1694

Juan Cárdenas (b. at Seville, 1613; d. 6 June 1684) was a Spanish Jesuit moral theologian and author. He entered the Society of Jesus at the age of fourteen, and during many years held in it the office of rector, master of novices, and provincial.

== Works ==
Cárdenas is chiefly remembered for his contributions to moral theology, which won praise from Alphonsus Ligouri. His controversial two-part "Crisis theologica bipartita, sive Desputationes selectæ" (Lyons, 1670), with an added supplement in the 1680 edition, argued against Laxism and Rigorism in favor of Probabilism. The Venetian editions of 1694, 1700, and 1710 combined the three previous parts with an explanation of the propositions condemned by the pope in 1679; this last has often been published separately under the title: Crisis theologica in qua plures selectæ difficultates ex morali theologia ad lydium veritatis lapidem revocantur ex regula morem positâ a SS. D.N. Innocentis XI P.M., etc.

Cárdenas also composed several small ascetical treatises, including:

- "Seven Meditations on Jesus Crucified" (originally published at Seville, 1678)
- "Geminum sidus Mariani diadematis" (Lyons, 1673)

He additionally wrote two pious biographies:

- "Historia de la Vida y Virtudes de la Venerable Virgen Damiana de las Llangas" (Seville, 1675)
- "Breve relación de la Muerte, Vida, y Virtudes del Venerabile Cavallero D. Miguel Manara Vincentelo de Leca" (Seville, 1679)
