= Miguel Cárdenas (politician) =

Mexican politician

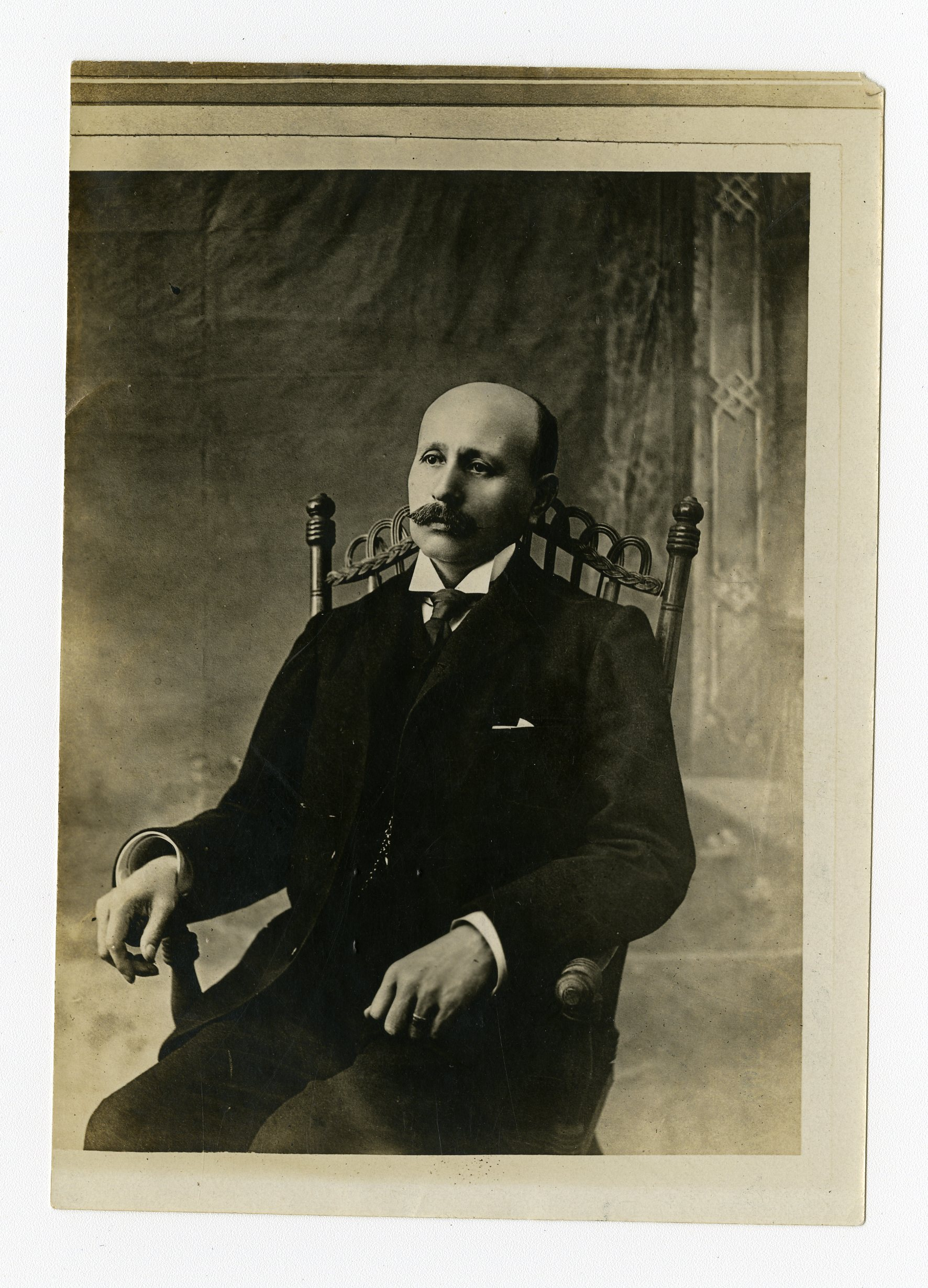
Miguel Cárdenas

Miguel Cárdenas de los Santos (September 29, 1855 – May 24, 1930) was a Mexican lawyer and politician. He was candidate for the elections of 1894 for the post of governor of Coahuila and was supported by Bernardo Reyes. But Cárdenas removed his candidacy as did José María Garza Galán. So, José María Múzquiz became governor. Eventually, Miguel Cárdenas became governor in 1894. He was governor until 1909. In 1905 Francisco Madero unsuccessfully opposed his reelection.

Cárdenas was from Saltillo.
