= Klaus Uwe Benneter =

German politician

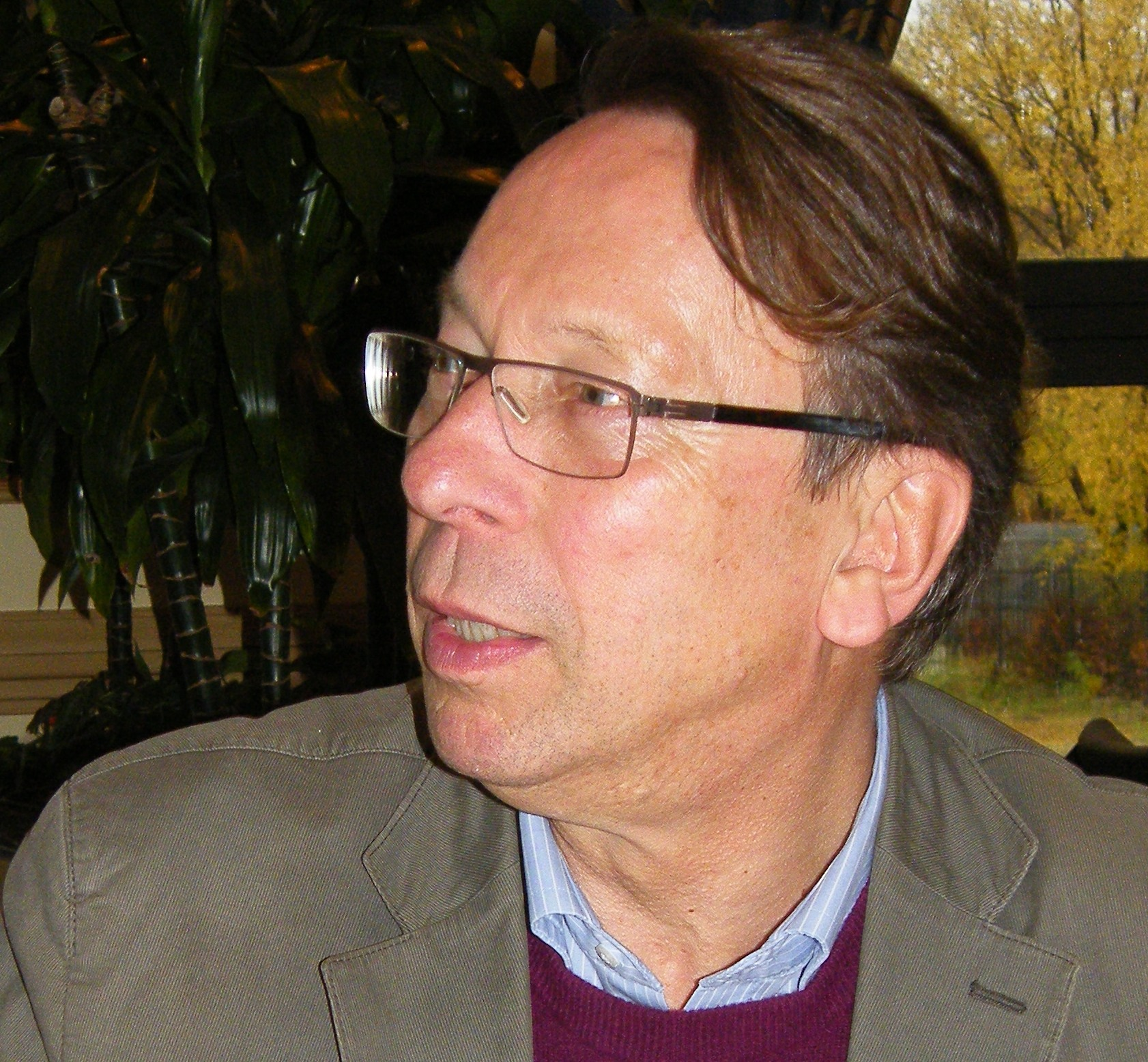
- Benneter in 2010

Member of the Bundestag; from Berlin
- In office 17 October 2002 – 27 October 2009
- Preceded by: Renate Rennebach
- Succeeded by: Multi-member district
- Constituency: Berlin-Steglitz-Zehlendorf (2002–2005); State list (2005–2009)

Member of the; Berlin House of Representatives
- In office October 1999 – 29 October 2002
- Preceded by: Multi-member district
- Succeeded by: Michael Arndt
- Constituency: Zehlendorf (1999–2001); Steglitz-Zehlendorf (2001–2002)

Personal details
- Born: 1 March 1947 (age 79) Karlsruhe, Germany
- Party: Social Democratic
- Children: 1
- Education: Free University of Berlin

Klaus Uwe Benneter (born 1 March 1947) is a German politician of the Social Democratic Party (SPD).

== Early life and education ==
Benneter was born in Karlsruhe. After finishing High School in Karlsruhe in 1966, Benneter studied law, economics and political science at the Free University of Berlin from, passing examinations in 1971 and 1974. From 1971 to 1976 he worked as a lecturer at the School of Economics in Berlin. From 1975, he has worked as a lawyer.

== Political career ==
Benneter joined the SPD in 1965. He was Vice-Chairman of the SPD youth wing from 1974 to 1977, becoming Chairman in 1977. Expelled from the SPD in 1977, he rejoined in 1983 and served as treasurer from 1990 to 1996 and thereafter deputy chairman of the Berlin SPD until 2000.

From 1999 to 2002, Benneter was a member of the Berlin House of Representatives. In 2002 he was elected to the Bundestag representing Berlin-Steglitz-Zehlendorf. Since November 2005, Benneter is legal adviser of the SPD parliamentary group. He lost his constituency seat at the 2005 election but returned to the parliament as a list member for Berlin region. He contested the Steglitz-Zehlendorf seat again at the 2009 election. On 27 September, he lost his mandate, just missing the return to the Bundestag via the party list by a few percentage points, being at list position 5. He has since returned to practicing law.

== Other activities ==
- German Orient Foundation, Member of the Board of Trustees
- Friedrich Ebert Foundation (FES), Member of the Board of Trustees

== Personal life ==
Benneter is widowed and has one son.

Party political offices
Preceded by Olaf Scholz	General Secretary of the Social Democratic Party of Germany; 2004-2005	Succeeded by Hubertus Heil
