= José Luis Blanco Pajón =

Mexican politician

- Born: 9 December 1956 (age 69); Yucatán, Mexico
- Occupation: Politician
- Political party: PRI

José Luis Blanco Pajón (born 9 December 1956) is a Mexican politician from the Institutional Revolutionary Party (PRI). In the 2006 general election he was elected to the Chamber of Deputies to represent the second district of Yucatán during the 60th Congress.
