= Brenda Cárdenas Thomae =

Mexican politician and lawyer (born 1982)

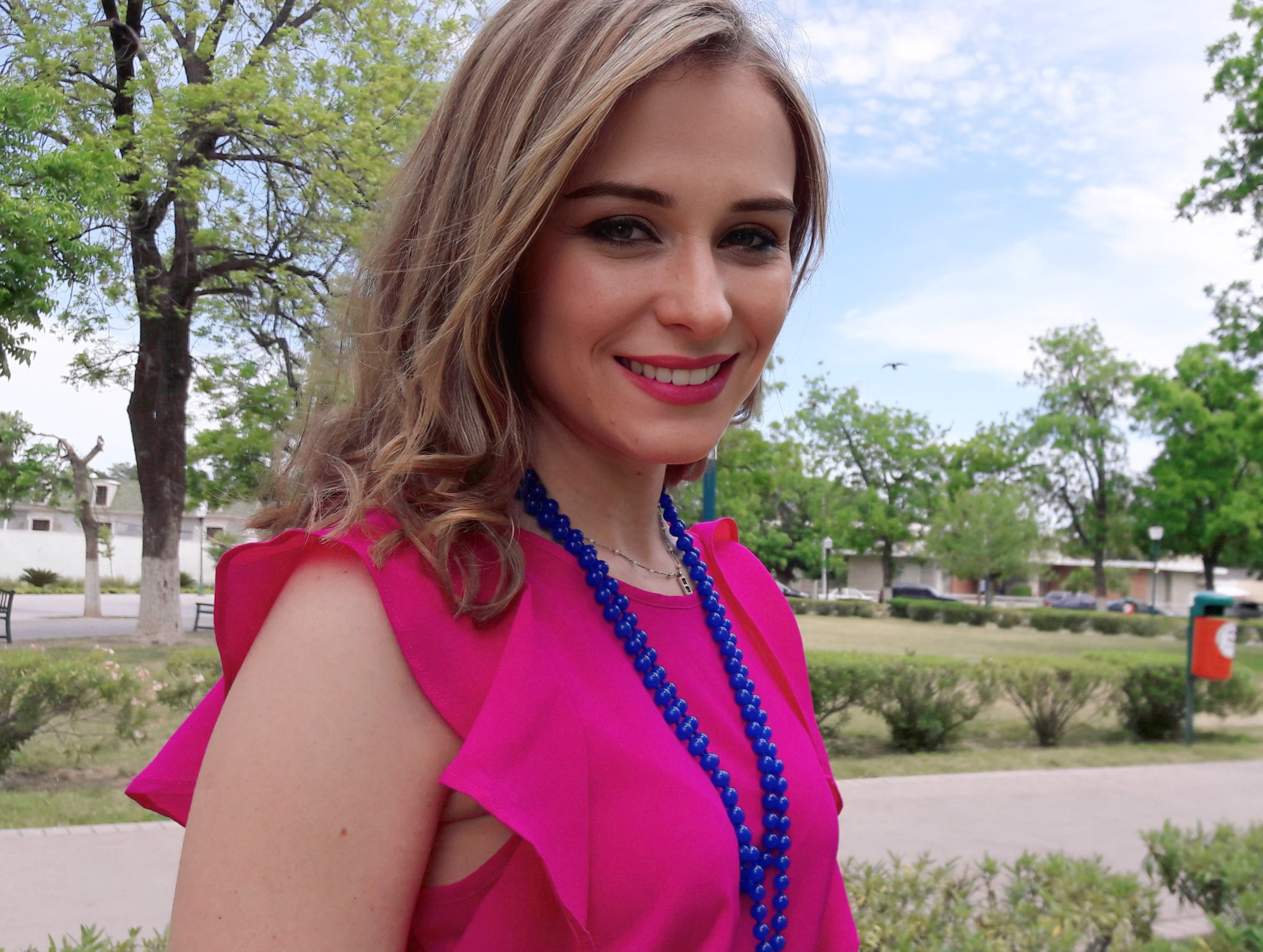

Member of the Congress of Tamaulipas from the 2nd district
- Preceded by: Laura Teresa Zarate Quezada
- Succeeded by: Imelda Sanmiguel Sánchez

Director of Migration Institute of Tamaulipas
- Preceded by: Jose Martin Carmona Flores
- Succeeded by: Francisco Parra Pérez

Personal details
- Born: 1982 (age 43–44) Monclova, Coahuila, Mexico
- Party: PAN
- Education: University of Monterrey; Autonomous University of Tamaulipas

Brenda Georgina Cárdenas Thomae (born in 1982) is a Mexican politician and lawyer. She has served as the Congresswoman for Nuevo Laredo District 2 at the Congress of Tamaulipas, associated with the National Action Party (PAN), and as Director of the Tamaulipas Migrants Institute state agency. She also ran as a councilwoman of Nuevo Laredo municipal government.

With a conservative platform she supports issues like border and migration issues, women's issues, children's issues, human rights, family issues, and constitutional issues.

== Early life ==
Cárdenas was born in Monclova, Coahuila, in 1982. After completing her high school studies at the Instituto America de Estudios Superiores (IAES) in Nuevo Laredo in 2000, she graduated as a lawyer from the University of Monterrey in 2004 and later earned her master's degree in taxation and international Accounting from the Autonomous University of Tamaulipas in 2010.

She was a professor of civil and constitutional Law at her alma mater, the Autonomous University of Tamaulipas, between 2015 and 2016.

In 2013 she was part of the PAN-led government of the mayor of Nuevo Laredo, Carlos Enrique Canturosas Villarreal, where she worked as Legal Coordinator for the municipality, as well as leading the municipal government's welfare program called Social Action and supervised the government's Contracts and Agreements area.

== 2016 electoral campaign ==
In February 2016, Cárdenas launched her campaign to become Tamaulipas congresswoman for Nuevo Laredo District 02 with PAN political party. Cárdenas' rivals included seasoned politicians like former first lady of Nuevo Laredo Elsa Tamez Villarreal.

On June 5, 2016, Cárdenas won the election, obtaining more than half of the votes. State-wide, she was the candidate to have received the biggest percentage of votes of all of Tamaulipas candidates for state congress. Cárdenas succeeds congresswoman Laura Teresa Zarate Quezada, from her party. With Cárdenas' victory, the PAN kept this congressional seat, the wealthiest in the Nuevo Laredo Municipality and one of the wealthiest in Tamaulipas and Mexico.

2016 Election for Tamaulipas Congress District 02 seat in Nuevo Laredo
| Political party | | Candidate | Votes | % |
|---|---|---|---|---|
| National Action Party (Mexico) | National Action Party (PAN) Incumbent | Brenda Georgina Cárdenas Thomae | 32,747 | 52.26% |
| | Institutional Revolutionary Party (PRI) | Elsa Tamez Villarreal | 22,197 | 35.42% |
| | National Regeneration Movement (MORENA) | Yasser Torres Aparicio | 1,298 | 2.07% |
| | Citizen Movement (MC) | Alejandro Escayola Escobar | 1,127 | 1.80% |
| | New Alliance Party | Janet Mariza Benavides Tuexi | 1,082 | 1.72% |
| | Social Encounter Party | Natalia Gisselle Garcia Fernandez | 999 | 1.59% |
| | Party of the Democratic Revolution (PRD) | Maria Clara Hinojosa Gutierrez | 838 | 1.34% |
| | Ecologist Green Party of Mexico (Verde) | Maria Guadalupe Alvarez Ibarra | 634 | 1.01% |
| | Labor Party (PT) | Silvia Jessica Cruz Juarez | 348 | 0.55% |
| | Unregistered candidates | | 61 | 0.10% |
| | Invalid votes | | 1,330 | 2.12% |
| | Total | | 62,661 | |

== Congress ==
Cárdenas was sworn in on October 1, 2016, at the Congress of Tamaulipas, in the state's capital Ciudad Victoria, as congresswoman of District 2, which represents Eastern and Southern Municipality of Nuevo Laredo. Since she was the member of congress to have received the biggest percentage of votes, she had the privilege to conduct the first session of legislative proceedings.

=== Committee assignments ===
==== Rules Committee ====
Chair of committee, where the reform to the Tamaulipas Congress internal organization and operation in order make the legislative process faster and professionalized.

==== Legislative Committee ====
Chair of committee, where the State of Tamaulipas Adoption Law was passed to regulate adoptions of minors.

==== Constitutional Affairs Committee ====
Secretary of committee.

==== Border and Migration Issues Committee ====
Member of committee, where the Tamaulipas Congress authorized the donation of a building to remodel the Juárez–Lincoln International Bridge which connects Nuevo Laredo and Laredo, Texas.

==== Family Committee ====
Member of committee.

==== Childhood, Teenage, and Youth Committee ====
Member of committee, where Civil Protection was invested with greater attributes to protect schools in case of an emergency.

==== Human Rights Committee ====
Member of committee, where a reform was passed to consider political violence against women as gender violence.

==== Judiciary Committee ====
Member of committee, where the Tribunal of Administrative Justices of Tamaulipas was created to prosecute corrupt public servants and citizens.

==== State and Municipal Heritage Committee ====
Member of Committee.

Cárdenas' congressional tenure ended on September 29, 2019; she was succeeded by Imelda Sanmiguel Sanchez of her same party.

== Political positions ==
Cárdenas has dedicated her legislative work to protect women, women's health access, legislate against gender-based political violence, strengthening justice, reform on private sector contracts with government, youth, children, and family. She is also an advocate in aiding migrants, who transit through her city of Nuevo Laredo daily. Cárdenas, a law intellectual, also dedicated her political work to the betterment of the legislative processes in her state.

During her tenure as a congresswoman she opened her district office in Nuevo Laredo to anyone who would need help—even if such help was not related to her congressional duties or to her constituents. People living in poverty, disabled persons, and migrants benefited from her non-official help.

Even though her political party aligns with right-wing conservative ideals, she has only openly talked about her ideals as to protect the youth and families, while also being a fighter for women's human rights.

== Migration issues ==
In February 2020, Cárdenas became Director of the Migrant Institute of Tamaulipas (ITM by its initials in Spanish), leading efforts to help migrants who were deported by the United States to Nuevo Laredo. During her administration she faced the rise of deportees made by the US government to Nuevo Laredo, where she helped people reach their families as well as channeling them to the different churches and organizations that house and feed migrants.

When the COVID-19 pandemic reached the US-Mexico border, Cardenas was at the forefront of protecting migrants and deported people from the virus.

== Criticism ==
=== As Congresswoman ===
Opponents of Cardenas argue she achieved her position only for being a woman, pointing there is a lack of specific enduring laws that benefited Nuevo Laredo, and arguing a case for nepotism for her relatives.

=== As Director of the Migrant Institute of Tamaulipas ===
Her adversaries also point out that international organisms decided to no longer support the Migrant Institute of Tamaulipas while Cardenas was director of the institute.
