= Andrea Blanco-Redondo =

Spanish photonics engineer

- Occupations: Photonics engineer and physicist

Andrea Blanco-Redondo is a Spanish photonics engineer and physicist who works at the University of Central Florida as Florida Photonics Center of Excellence (FPCE) Endowed Professor in the College of Optics and Photonics (CREOL). She is known for her discovery of optical quartic solitons; her research interests also include topological photonics, quantum optics, nanophotonics, photonic crystals, and slow light.

== Education and career ==
Blanco-Redondo earned a master's degree in electrical engineering at the University of Valladolid in 2006, including research in England at Aston University. She completed a Ph.D. in electrical engineering at the University of the Basque Country in 2014.

From 2007 to 2014 she worked in industry, for the Telecom Unit of Spanish firm Tecnalia. From 2013 to 2019 she was affiliated with the School of Physics at the University of Sydney, as a student Marie Curie Fellow, postdoctoral research fellow, Professor Harry Messel Research Fellow, lecturer, and senior lecturer. In 2019 she moved to Nokia Bell Labs as a researcher, soon becoming head of silicon photonics. She took her present position as Florida Photonics Center of Excellence (FPCE) Endowed Professor at the University of Central Florida in 2023.

== Recognition ==
Blanco-Redondo was the 2014 runner-up for the Ada Byron Award for Spanish women in technology. She was the 2016 recipient of the Geoff Opat Early Career Researcher Prize of the Australian and New Zealand Optical Society.

Optica named her as an Optica Ambassador in 2018, and as a 2024 Optica Fellow, "for her discovery of pure-quartic solitons and pioneering contributions to topological quantum photonics".
