= Carmen Blanco y Trigueros =

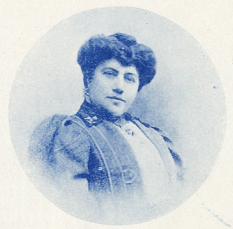
Carmen Blanco y Trigueros (Feminal, 24 November 1907)

Carmen Blanco y Trigueros (Granada, ca. 1840 - October 17, 1921) was a Spanish writer, poet, and journalist.

== Biography ==
Born in Granada, in the 1840s, she was educated in Catalonia.

Her first works were published in the Catalan press, even though she left Barcelona. In 1878, she published in La Crónica de Cataluña a collection of serious and humorous articles entitled "Retratos de perfil, bocetos á vuelapluma" (Profile portraits, sketches á vuelapluma), presented by Mobellán. In 1879, she published a novel in the newspaper El Cascabel. In addition to novels and short story collections, she wrote articles and other works, sometimes unsigned, in various newspapers in Madrid and the provinces, such as El Globo, El Álbum Ibero-Americano, El Cascabel, or La Semana Madrileña. She traveled extensively through Morocco, writing travel publications, and met Clorinda Matto de Turner. Carmen de Burgos praised Blanco's work.

Carmen Blanco y Trigueros died on October 17, 1921.
