= Juan José Blanco =

Uruguayan footballer (born 1985)

Personal information
- Full name: Juan José Blanco Dini
- Date of birth: 19 December 1985 (age 40)
- Place of birth: Las Piedras, Uruguay
- Height: 1.78 m (5 ft 10 in)
- Position: Defensive midfielder

Youth career
- 2002–2003: Juventud Las Piedras

Senior career*
Years	Team	Apps	(Gls)
2003–2005	Juventud Las Piedras	23	(2)
2005–2006	Peñarol	2	(0)
2007	Liverpool Montevideo	11	(0)
2007–2008	UE Lleida	4	(0)
2008–2009	CF Balaguer	10	(0)
2009	Mallorca B	13	(2)
2010	Cerro Largo	23	(0)
2011	Montevideo Wanderers	17	(1)
2012–2014	Cerro Largo	13	(1)
2014–2016	El Tanque Sisley	27	(0)
- * Club domestic league appearances and goals

Juan José Blanco (born December 19, 1985) is a retired Uruguayan football player who played as a defensive midfielder. He holds an Italian passport as second nationality.
