= Jorge Blanco =

Jorge Blanco may refer to:

- Jorge Blanco (artist) (born 1945), Venezuelan artist
- Jorge Blanco (director) (active from 2009), film actor, writer and director
- Jorge Blanco (musician) (born 1991), Mexican actor and musician
- Salvador Jorge Blanco (1926–2010), 48th President of the Dominican Republic
- Jorge Blanco (athlete) (born 1993), Spanish long distance runner.
