= Tomás Blanco =

Tomás Blanco may refer to:

- Tomás Blanco (writer) (1896–1975), Puerto Rican writer and historian
- Tomás Blanco (actor) (1910–1990), Spanish film actor
- Tomás Blanco (footballer) (born 1999), Argentine footballer
