= Marco Bertaiolli =

Brazilian politician (born 1968)

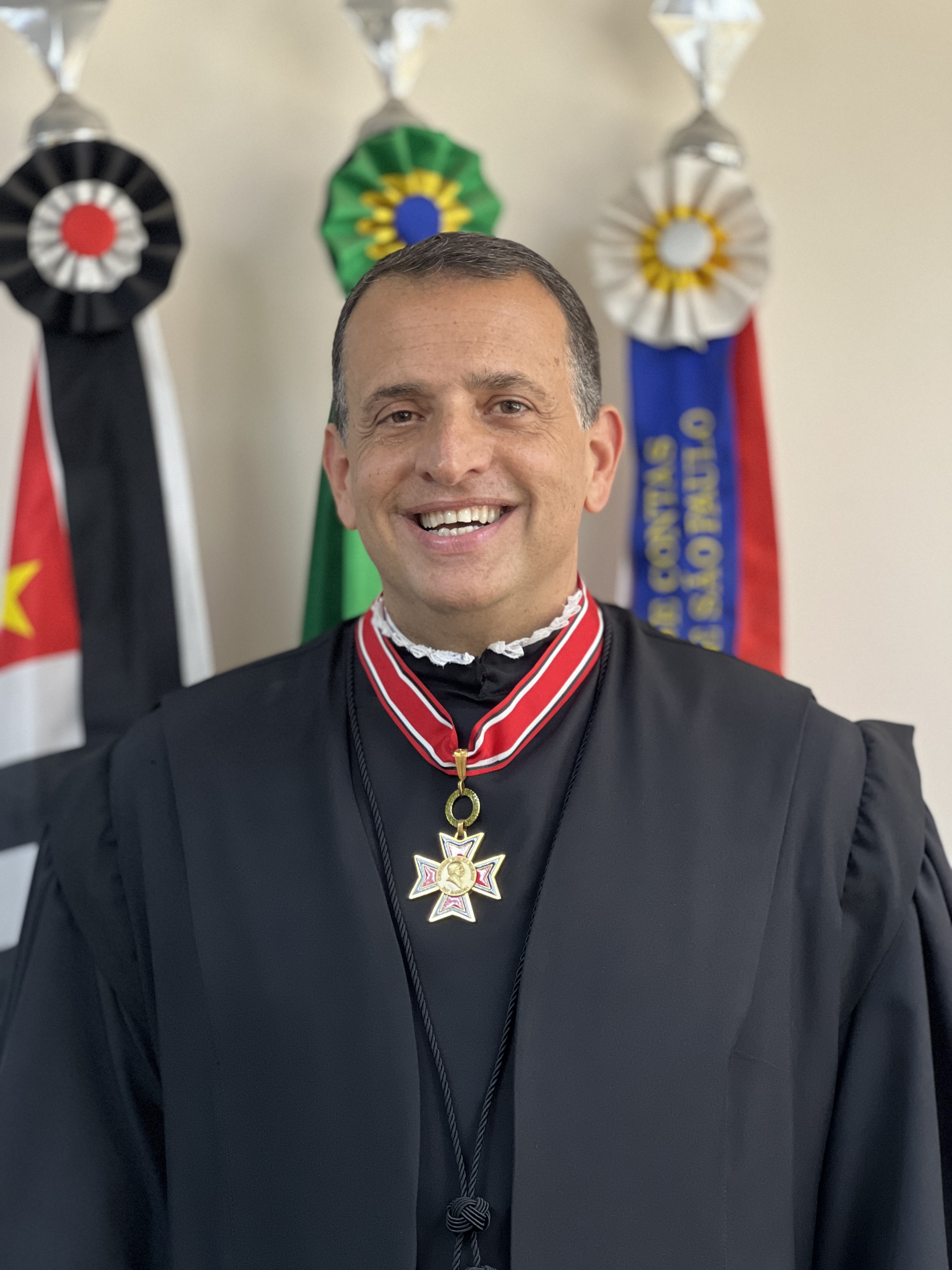
- Bertaiolli in 2023

Member of the Chamber of Deputies
- In office 1 February 2019 – 27 September 2023
- Succeeded by: Saulo Pedroso
- Constituency: São Paulo

Personal details
- Born: 30 April 1968 (age 58)
- Party: Social Democratic Party (since 2011)

Marco Aurélio Bertaiolli (born 30 April 1968) is a Brazilian politician serving as a counsellor of the Court of Auditors of São Paulo since 2023. From 2019 to 2023, he was a member of the Chamber of Deputies. From 2009 to 2016, he served as mayor of Mogi das Cruzes.
