= Raymundo Cárdenas =

Mexican politician

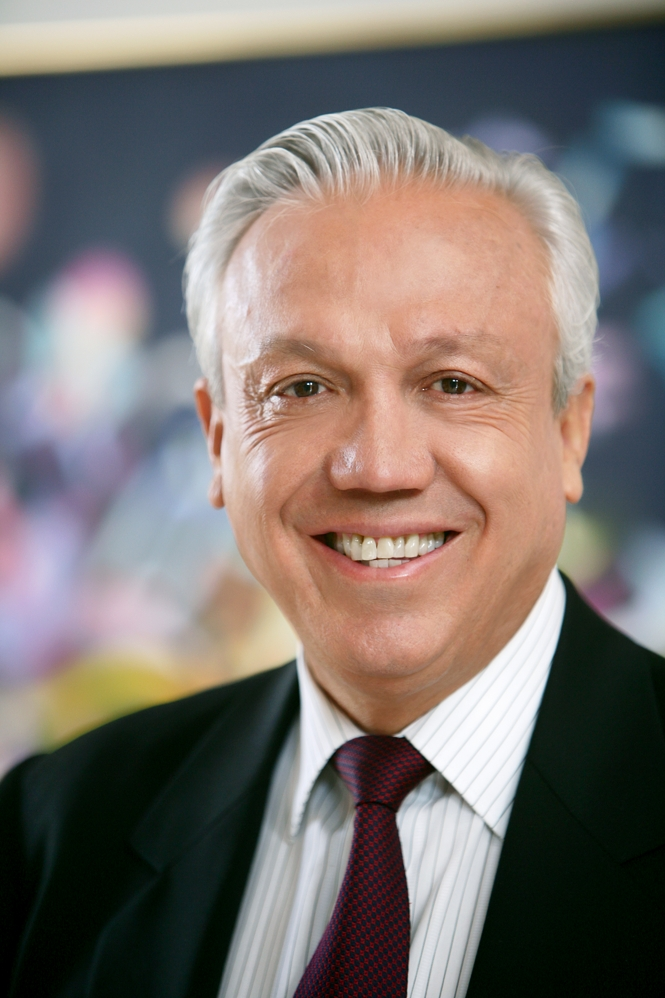
Raymundo Cárdenas Hernández

Raymundo Cárdenas Hernández (born 3 February 1950) is a Mexican left-wing politician from Zacatecas affiliated with the Party of the Democratic Revolution (PRD) who has served in both chambers of Congress.

== Early life ==
Cárdenas was born on 3 February 1950 in Villanueva, Zacatecas. He studied chemical engineering at the Autonomous University of Zacatecas, where he remained as a long-time professor.

== Political career ==
Cárdenas joined the Mexican Communist Party (PCM) in the late 1970s, which merged into the Unified Socialist Party of Mexico (PSUM) in 1981. From 1983 to 1986 he served as local deputy in the Congress of Zacatecas representing the PSUM, then from 1991 to 1994 he served again in the Congress of Zacatecas during its 55th session representing the PRD.

In 2000 he was elected to serve in the Senate during the 58th and 59th sessions of Congress (2000 to 2006).

In the 2006 congressional election, he won a seat in the lower house of Congress, representing the third district of Zacatecas.
