= Marco Campese =

Italian footballer (born 1990)

Personal information
- Date of birth: 9 May 1980 (age 46)
- Place of birth: Grugliasco, Italy
- Height: 1.75 m (5 ft 9 in)
- Position: Midfielder

Senior career*
Years	Team	Apps	(Gls)
1997–1998	Juventus	0	(0)
1998–2000	Biellese	25	(1)
2000–2001	Teramo	17	(1)
2001–2005	Gualdo	98	(8)
2005–2006	Forlì	5	(0)
2006	Bastia	5	(1)
2006–2007	Arrone	12	(1)
2006	Real Montecchio	20	(4)
2007–2014	Gualdo		
- * Club domestic league appearances and goals

Marco Campese (born 9 May 1980) is an Italian former football midfielder.

== Appearances on Italian Series ==
Serie A : 0 Apps

Serie C2 : 145 Apps, 10 Goals

Serie D : 32 Apps, 2 Goals

Eccellenza : 65 Apps, 5 Goals

Total : 242 Apps, 17 Goals
