= Marco Antonio Garcia Blanco =

Mexican diplomat, current ambassador of Mexico to Nigeria

Marco Antonio García Blanco (born 20 October 1960) is a Mexican diplomat and the current Ambassador of Mexico to Nigeria.

== Education ==
Blanco received his bachelor's degree in International Relations from the National Autonomous University of Mexico and a master's degree in National Security from the National Defense College of Mexico.

== Career ==
Upon completion of his studies, he was recruited by the Ministry of Foreign Affairs. He has served as advisor to the Secretary of Foreign Affairs. He has also been part of various delegations at international events.

== See also ==
- Mexico–Nigeria relations
