= Marco Cárdenas =

Venezuelan engraver

- Born: 21 February 1955; Maracaibo, Venezuela
- Occupation: University professor
- Awards: Third prize of engraving (1982); Third prize of engraving (1984); First prize of Graphic Arts Luis Chacón (1988); Second prize of engraving (1989); Honorable Mention (1990); First prize of engraving (1991); Third prize (1995)

Marco Cárdenas (born 21 February 1955) is a Venezuelan engraver.

== Biography ==
Son of Fredelín Cárdenas and Hilda González. He studied graphic arts at the Academia de Bellas Artes Neptalí Rincón in Maracaibo, from where he graduated in 1980. He worked at TAGA between 1981 and 1982, and participated in the lithography seminar given by Mike Sims at Cegra in 1981. Between 1987 and 1993 he studied aesthetic education at UPEL in Maracaibo and, in 1994, he took a postgraduate course in education of intelligence, creativity and talent, taught by Jorge Calderón (official of the Central Institute of Pedagogical Sciences of Cuba), sponsored by the Ministry of Education.

That same year he studied methodology for the teaching of plastic arts with José Miguel Pérez at the Colegio de Bellas Artes de Maracaibo, and between 1997 and 1998 he took a continuing education course in expression in plastic arts at the Fundación Instituto de Expresión y Creatividad. Cardenas has specialized in the technique of black and white woodcut, with which he achieves a unique handling of the line. His themes range from the dreamlike to the satirical, trying to raise the ecological problems of his homeland; also, he uses in his proposal the human figure as the center of attention.

Cárdenas has participated in the Salón Arturo Michelena, the Salón Aragua, the I and II Biennial of Drawing and Engraving (Galería de Arte Nacional and Museo de Arte La Rinconada, Caracas), the Biennial of Graphic Arts Juan de Guruceaga (Museo Cruz-Diez) and in international exhibitions in Puerto Rico, Colombia, Cuba, the United States and Argentina.

== Solo exhibitions ==
Among his exhibitions are:

- 1983 - “Grabados”, Centro Cívico Coquivacoa, Maracaibo.
- 1989 - “Dibujo y gráfica”, Sala Julio Arraga, Maracaibo.
- 1994 - “Dibujos y grabados”, Galería Soporte/Superficie, Maracaibo.

== Awards ==
His awards include:

- 1982 - Third prize of engraving, III Salón de Arte Occidente Corpo Andes, Mérida / Prize of engraving, I Biennial of Visual Arts City of Maracaibo.
- 1984 - Third prize of engraving, V Salón de Arte de Occidente, Biblioteca Bolivariana, Mérida.
- 1988 - First Prize of Graphic Arts Luis Chacón, III Biennial of Visual Arts City of Maracaibo.
- 1989 - Second prize of engraving, I Biennial of Small Format Graphic Arts, LUZ.
- 1990 - Honorable mention, Biennial of Graphic Arts of the Young Printmaking, Casa de las Americas, Havana.
- 1991 - First prize of engraving, IV Biennial of Graphic Arts City of Maracaibo / Unique prize of graphic arts, XVI Aragua Salon, Museum of Art of Maracay.
- 1995 - Third prize, I Biennial of Latin American and Caribbean Engraving, Faculty of Fine Arts, Universidad del Atlántico, Barranquilla, Colombia.

== Collections ==
Some of his collections are:

- Biblioteca Bolivariana, Mérida.
- Casa de las Américas, La Habana.
- Conac.
- Concejo Municipal del Distrito Girardot, Edo. Aragua.
- LUZ.
- TAGA.
