= Marco Hahnfeld =

German politician (born 1988)

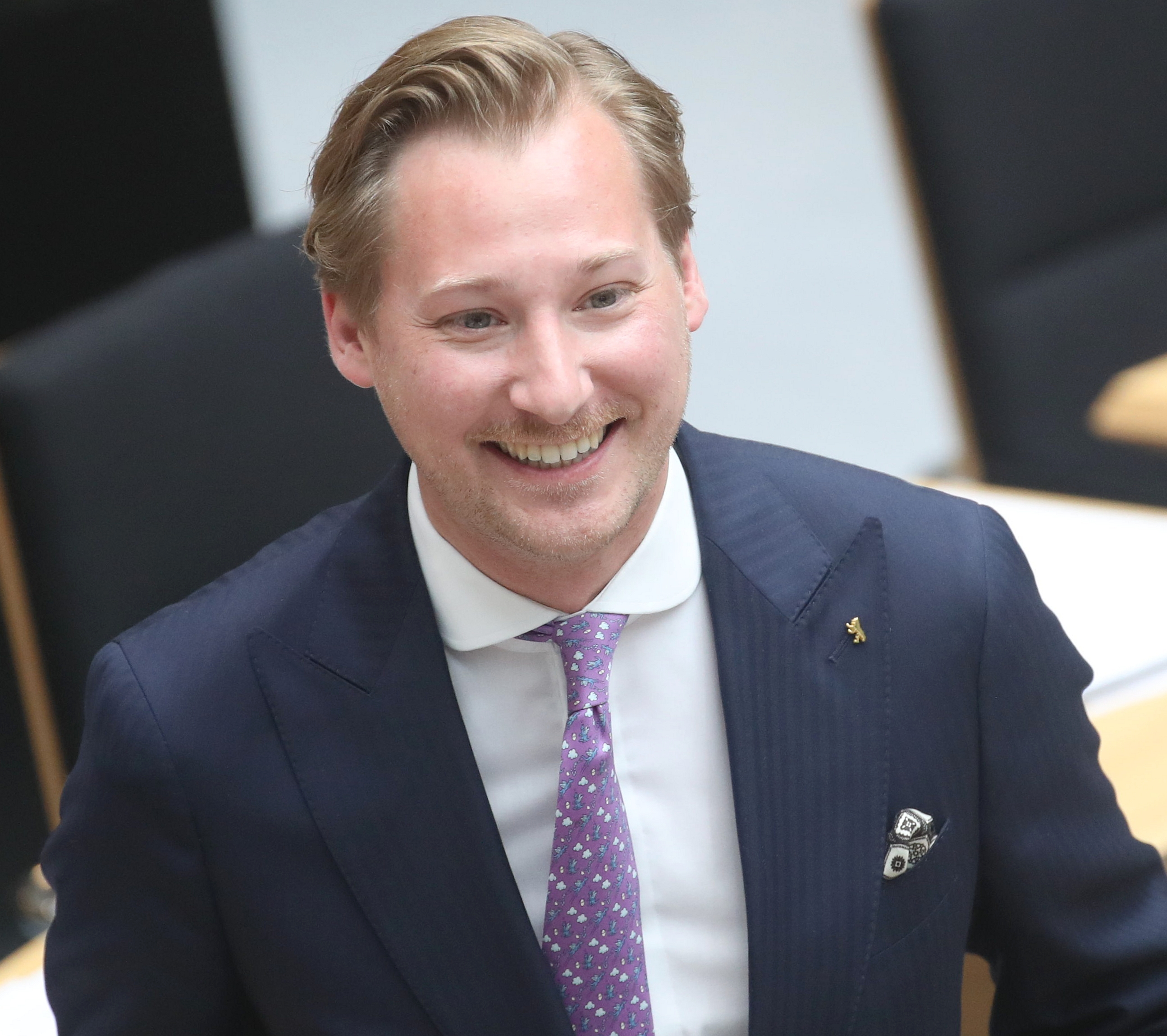
- Hahnfeld in 2025

Member of the Berlin House of Representatives
- Incumbent
- Assumed office 2 May 2025
- Preceded by: Adrian Grasse
- Constituency: Steglitz-Zehlendorf

Personal details
- Born: 1988 (age 37–38)
- Party: Christian Democratic Union (since 2005)

Marco André Hahnfeld (born 1988) is a German politician serving as a member of the Berlin House of Representatives since 2025. He is the chairman of the Christian Democratic Union in Lankwitz.
