= Luis Cárdenas Saavedra =

Founder of first public school in Caracas, Venezuela

Luis Cárdenas Saavedra was a professor and founder of the first public school in Caracas in Venezuela.

== Establishment ==
In May 1591, Saavedra went to the local government (Cabildo) and offered to teach orphaned children in the city of Caracas. The Cabildo approved his request and named a commission headed by the mayor Alonso Díaz Moreno and alderman Lorenzo Martínez, who gathered 50 ducats of 8 Spanish reals to pay Saavedra's salary for a year. The collection had to be made from the inhabitants of the city, primarily from wealthy families. On July 16, 1591, the Cabildo received and approved the request. Assistants at the meeting and signatories included the Governor and Captain General of the province of Venezuela, Diego de Osorio; the captain Sebastián Díaz Moreno; and Lorenzo Martínez.

At that time, education was limited to the children of wealthy families who paid teachers, priests or university students. As a result, most of the people were illiterate.
