= Temperance movement in the United Kingdom =

British social movement against alcohol

The temperance movement in the United Kingdom was a social movement that campaigned against the recreational use and sale of alcohol, and promoted total abstinence (teetotalism). In the 19th century, high levels of alcohol consumption and drunkenness were seen by social reformers as a danger to society's wellbeing, leading to social issues such as poverty, child neglect, immorality and economic decline. Temperance societies began to be formed in the 1830s to campaign against alcohol. Specific groups were created over periods of time dedicated to the different aspects of drinking. For example, in 1847, the Band of Hope was created to persuade children not to start drinking alcohol. Most of these temperance groups were aimed at the working class. Temperance was also supported by some religious groups, particularly the Nonconformist churches. Although the temperance movement met with local success in parts of Britain, it failed to impose national prohibition, and disappeared as a significant force following the Second World War.

== Origins ==
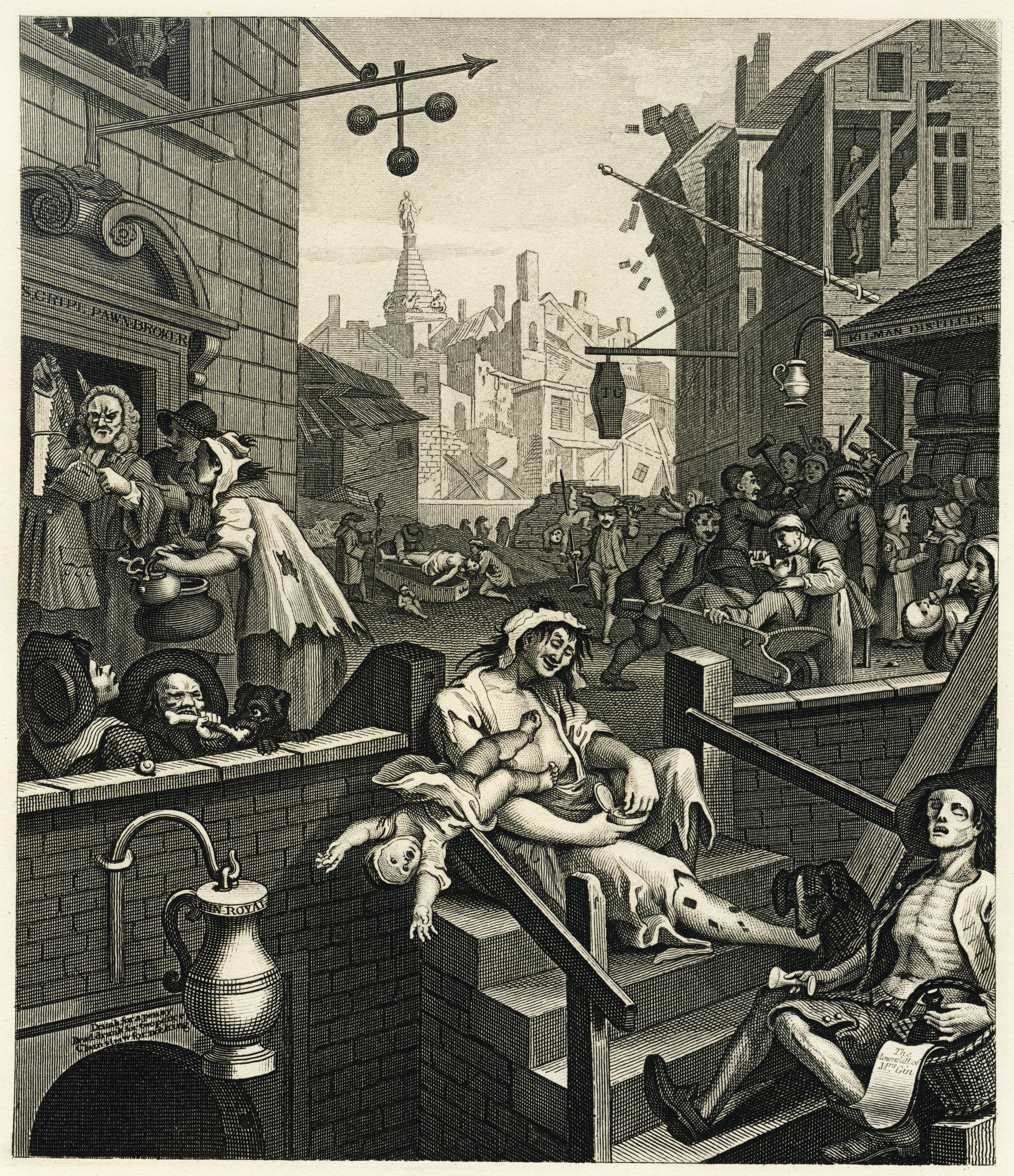
Gin Lane by William Hogarth, 1751, is a satirical engraving that criticises the widespread social ruin caused by excessive gin drinking.

Before the 19th century, there were diatribes published against drunkenness and excess, but total abstinence from alcohol was very rarely advocated or practised. In the 18th century, there was a "gin craze" in Great Britain, as satirised in William Hogarth's Gin Lane. The bourgeoisie became increasingly critical of the widespread drunkenness among the lower classes. Motivated by the bourgeoisie's desire for order, and amplified by the population growth in the cities, the drinking of gin became the subject of critical national debate. In 1743, John Wesley, the founder of the Methodist churches, proclaimed "that buying, selling, and drinking of liquor, unless absolutely necessary, were evils to be avoided".

== Early movement ==
The early temperance movement was inspired by the actions of Irish Presbyterian Church minister John Edgar, who poured his stock of whiskey out of his window in 1829. On 14 August 1829 he wrote a letter in the Belfast Telegraph advocating temperance. Edgar and other early advocates concentrated their efforts on the elimination of spirits rather than wine and beer. The first organisation that promoted temperance was founded in 1829 by John Dunlop and his aunt, Lilias Graham of Gairbraid, and named the Glasgow and West of Scotland Temperance Society.

Joseph Livesey was another British temperance advocate who financed his philanthropic work with the profits attained from cheese production, following an introduction to the food product by a doctor he had consulted with regards to a serious ailment in 1816. Livesey opened the first temperance hotel in 1833 and the next year founded the first temperance magazine, The Preston Temperance Advocate (1834–37). The British Association for the Promotion of Temperance was established by 1835.

As a response to rising social problems in the newly industrialised cities, a stricter form of temperance emerged called teetotalism, which promoted the complete abstinence from alcoholic beverages, this time including wine and beer, not just ardent spirits. The term teetotal is apocryphally said to derive from a speech by Richard "Dickie" Turner, a follower of Livesey, in Preston in 1833.

In 1838, the mass working class movement for universal suffrage, Chartism, included a current called "temperance chartism". Faced with the refusal of the parliament of the time to give the right to vote to working people, the temperance chartists saw the campaign against alcohol as a way of proving to the elites that working-class people were responsible enough to be granted the vote. In short, the 1830s was mostly characterised by moral persuasion of workers.

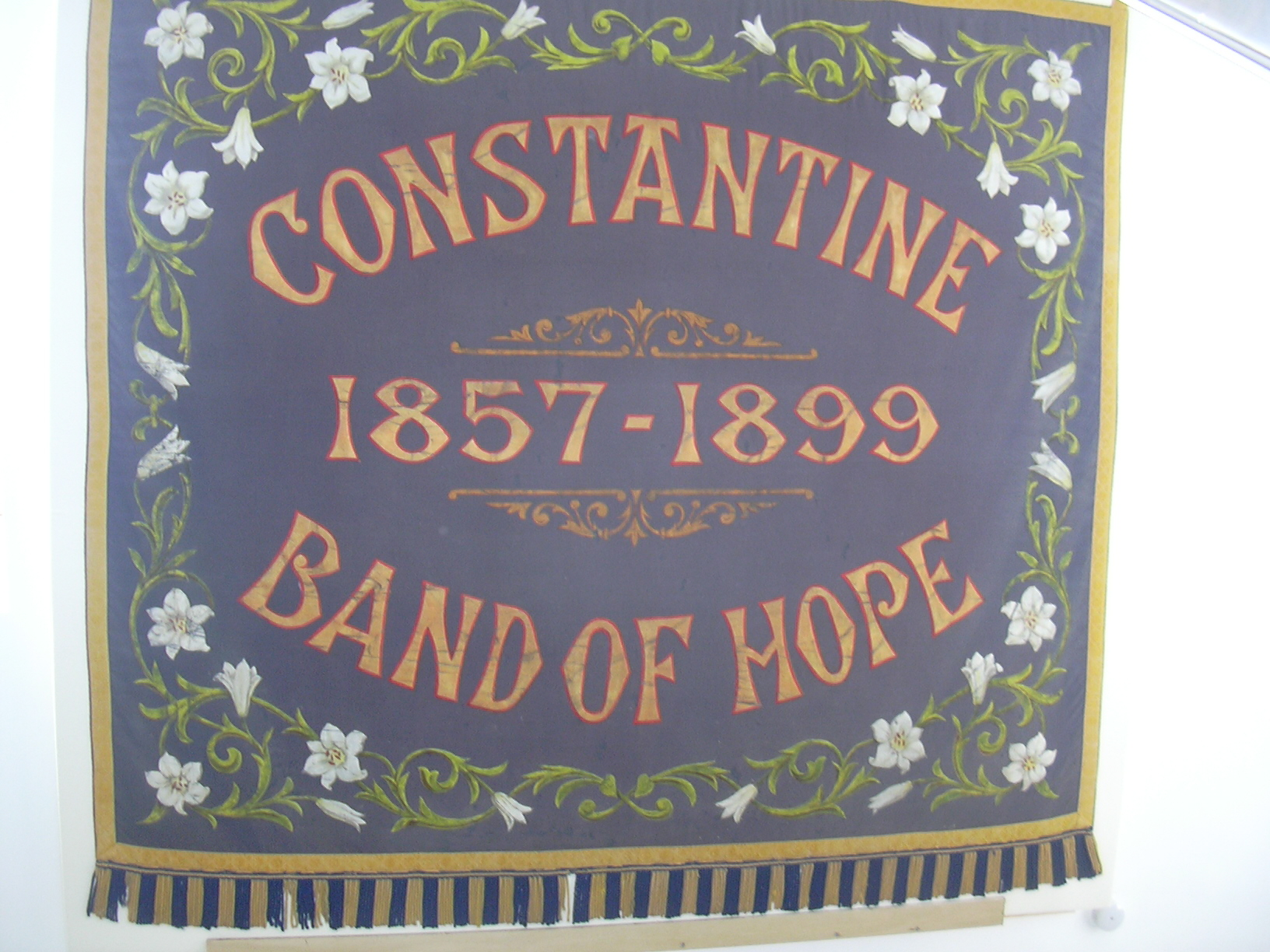
Band of Hope Banner supporting temperance, located in the village of Constantine in Cornwall

In 1847, the Band of Hope was founded in Leeds, with the stated aim of saving working class children from the perils of drink. It promoted alcohol education. Band members had to pledge to abstain "from all liquors of an intoxicating quality, whether ale, porter, wine or ardent spirits, except as medicine"

In 1853, inspired by the Maine liquor law in the US, the United Kingdom Alliance was formed with the aim of promoting a similar law prohibiting the sale of alcohol in the UK. This hard-line group of prohibitionists was opposed by other temperance organisations who preferred moral persuasion to a legal ban. This division in the ranks limited the effectiveness of the temperance movement as a whole. The impotence of legislation in this field was demonstrated when the Sale of Beer Act 1854 which restricted Sunday opening hours had to be repealed, following widespread rioting. In 1856, the National Temperance League was formed as an amalgamation of two other organizations. In 1859, a prototype prohibition bill was overwhelmingly defeated in the House of Commons.

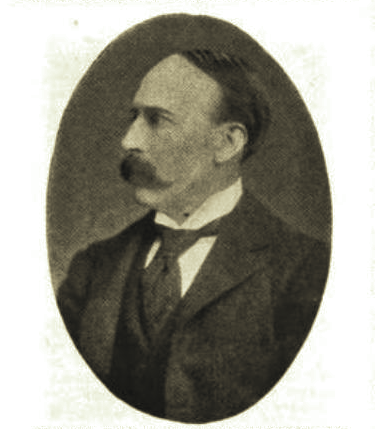
Archibald Cameron Corbett, President of the Scottish Permissive Bill and Temperance Association during its 50 year anniversary in 1908.

Temperance clubs and institutes came into being, one of the largest in the UK, formed in 1864 and still in use, was Wisbech Working Men's Club and Institute, Isle of Ely. One of its trustees was the banker and Quaker Baron Peckover, Lord Lieutenant of Cambridgeshire.

The US-based (but international) Woman's Christian Temperance Union (WCTU) was founded in 1873, becoming one of the largest women's societies in the world in the 19th century, campaigning for temperance and women's suffrage. In 1876 the British Women's Temperance Association was formed by women to persuade men to stop drinking, rebranded in 2006 as the White Ribbon Association.

One of the most active advocates of temperance was Dr. Norman Shanks Kerr. He promoted the treatment of inebriates and held that inebriety was a disease, not a vice, and that it should be treated accordingly. In 1884, in response to the inadequacy of the Habitual Drunkards Act 1879, he founded the Society for the Study and Cure of Inebriety and was the first president. The society still exists as the Society for the Study of Addiction.

In 1884 the National Temperance Federation, which was associated with the Liberal Party, was founded as an umbrella organisation. The Conservative Party largely supported the interests of the alcohol industry and opposed temperance.

== Religious support ==
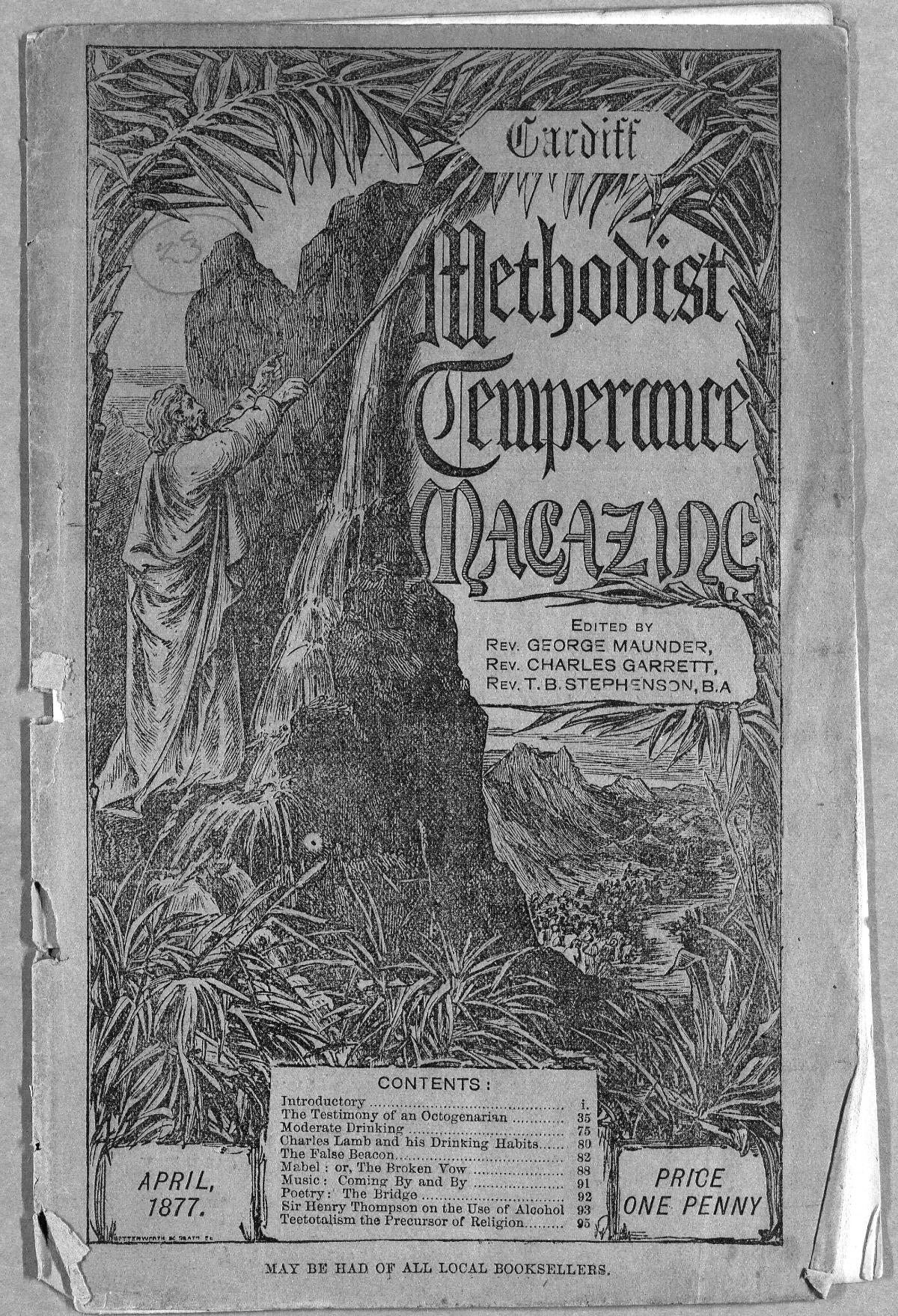
Methodist Temperance Magazine, a Wesleyan Methodist publication in Cardiff

The various Nonconformist churches often actively encouraged total abstinence among their congregations, and lobbied parliament to restrict alcohol sales. By the 1870s most young ministers abstained from alcohol. In 1886 a survey of 1,900 Baptist ministers revealed that 1,000 were total abstainers.

In the 19th century, the Methodist churches were strongly aligned with the temperance movement. Methodists believed that despite the supposed economic benefits of liquor traffic such as job creation and taxes, the harm that it caused society through its contribution to murder, gambling, prostitution, and political corruption outweighed its economic benefits. Both Wesleyan Methodists and Primitive Methodists championed the cause of temperance. The Wesleyan Methodists built around 100 'Central Halls', large venues which hosted cheap concerts, comedy shows and films, intended to keep the urban working classes away from public houses.

In 1864, another Methodist group, the Salvation Army was founded in London with a heavy emphasis on abstinence from alcohol and ministering to the working class, which led publicans to fund a Skeleton Army in order to disrupt their meetings. The Salvation Army quickly spread internationally, maintaining an emphasis on abstinence and remains a major charity to this day.

In Wales Lady Llanover, motivated by Calvinistic Methodist teachings, was an outspoken critic of the evils of alcohol and closed all the public houses on her estate.

Many Quakers (members of the Religious Society of Friends) took an active role in the temperance movement. Chocolatier John Cadbury was a temperance Quaker and he viewed drinking chocolate as an alternative to alcoholic beverages. He prohibited the sale of alcohol in Bournville, the model village he founded for his workers, and no public houses have been built there.

The Church of England Temperance Society, which had roots in the Anglo-Catholic tradition, was founded in 1862 by Henry Ellison, and its volunteers within the court system would lead to the first probation service. The League of the Cross was founded in 1873 by Cardinal Manning. A Roman Catholic-only organisation, the League's members took a pledge of total abstinence.

From 1880 to 1882 the cause of abstinence was revived by the Gospel Temperance or Blue Ribbon movement, based in America. They sent a member named Richard Booth to promote their cause in England through mass meetings held up and down the country.

== Later movement and decline ==
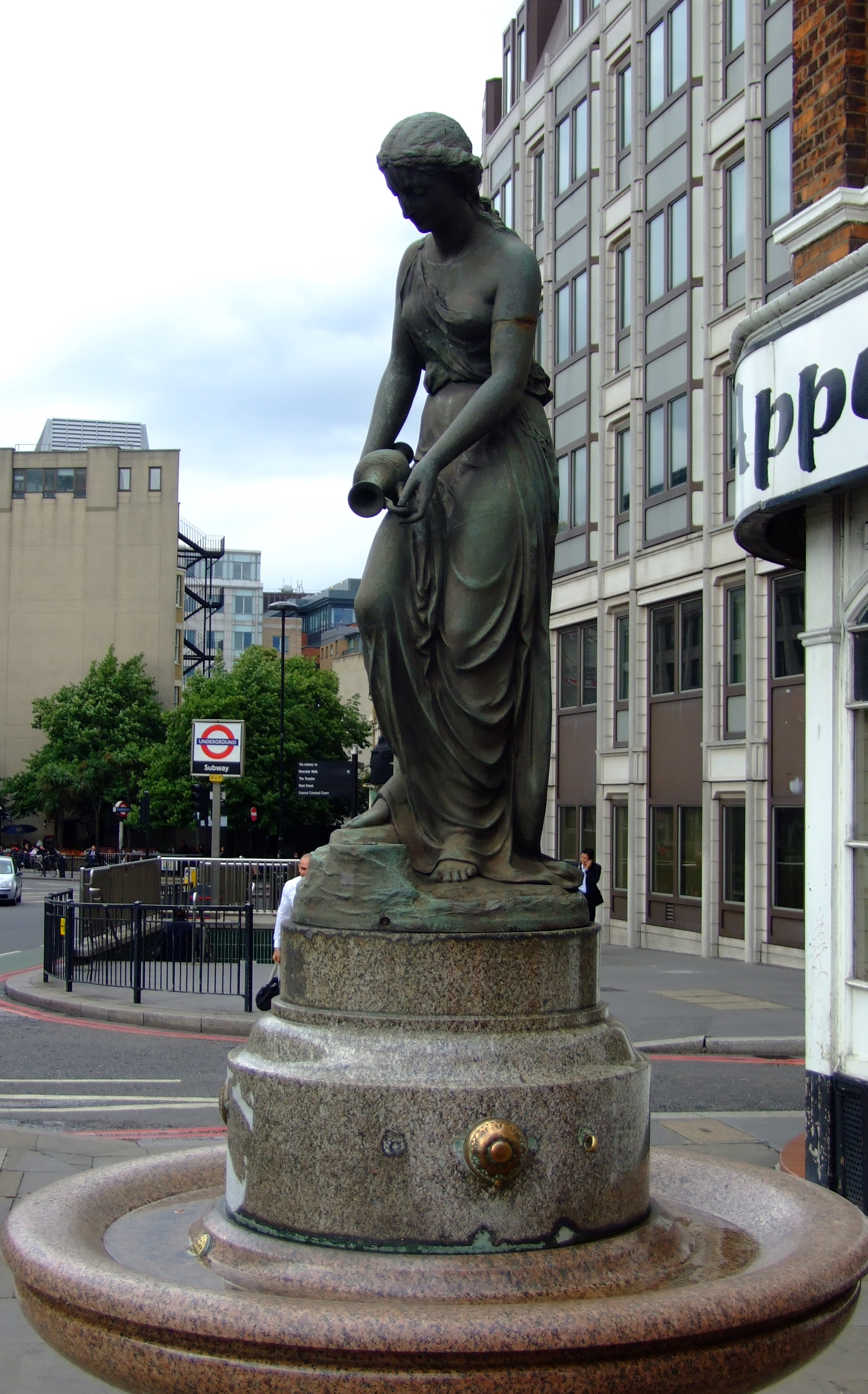
Temperance fountain at the end of Blackfriars Bridge, London. Temperance fountains were installed to encourage people not to drink beer by the provision of safe and free water.

By the end of the 19th century, it was estimated that about a tenth of the adult population were total abstainers of alcohol.

The temperance movement received an unexpected boost due to state intervention when the Liberal government passed the Defence of the Realm Act 1914 at the beginning of the First World War. According to the provisions of the act, pub hours were licensed, beer was watered down and was subject to a penny a pint extra tax. This situation was maintained by the subsequent establishment of the State Management Scheme in 1916 which nationalised breweries and pubs in certain areas of Britain where armaments manufacture was taking place.

At the same time, there were temperance organisations connected to the labour movement. An example would be the Scottish Prohibition Party, founded in 1901 by a communist temperance activist called Bob Stewart, who followed the Labour Party on all other issues. It went on to defeat Winston Churchill in Dundee in the 1922 general election. There was a Marxist offshoot called the Prohibition and Reform Party, which later became part of the Communist Party of Great Britain in 1920.

Between the wars, American exponents of the example set to Britain by National Prohibition, such as William "Pussyfoot" Johnson and Mary Harris Armor, toured the country, to be met with derision, and in Johnson's case, violence. In the end, the example of the failure of prohibition in America put an end to any remote chance that the temperance lobby would succeed in achieving its aims in the UK.

In February 1960 Forte applied for a table licence for its new Newport Pagnell services, but after opposition from local vicars, and the Methodist and Baptist churches, and not least the local police, the local magistrates refused the table licence, setting a precedent for all British motorway service stations, to this day.

== Legacy ==
The former Manchester City F.C. football stadium Maine Road took its name from a street that had been renamed Maine Road (from Dog Kennel Lane) by members of the temperance movement. They selected the name as a result of the 1851 Maine Law.

Vimto, originally "Vim Tonic", was concocted in 1908 as a healthy alternative to alcohol, and originally sold in temperance bars. Mr Fitzpatrick's in Rawtenstall, Lancashire, is thought to be the oldest surviving temperance bar – other such establishments became more popular in the 2010s.

Several of the largest temperance organisations survive under different names. For example, the Band of Hope is now named Hope UK, with the stated aim of "providing drug and alcohol education and training for children and young people, parents and youth workers".

== See also ==
- List of temperance organizations
- Health effects of alcohol
- Humanitarian movement
- Temperance bar § United Kingdom
- Harriet A. Glazebrook – English temperance advocate (1847–1937)
