= Mr Fitzpatrick's =

Temperance bar in Rawtenstall, Lancashire, England

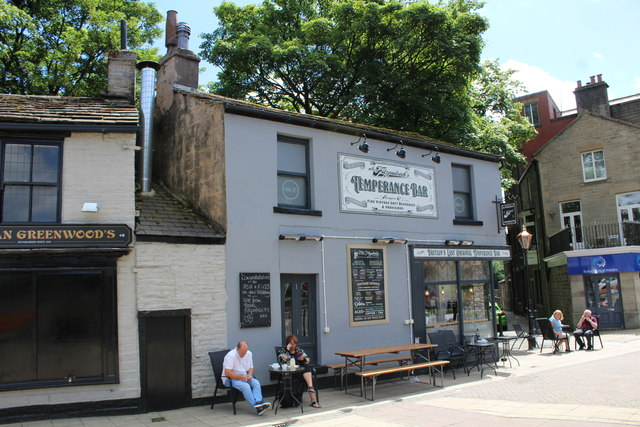
Mr Fitzpatrick's in 2017

Mr Fitzpatrick's, previously Fitzpatrick's Herbal Health, is a temperance bar in Rawtenstall, Lancashire. It is the oldest surviving temperance bar in the United Kingdom.

== History ==
Mr Fitzpatrick's was established in the 1890s (Note: There are contradictory reports on when it was established: 1890; 1899) by Irish immigrants from Dublin during the peak of the temperance movement and was formerly operated alongside 39 other branches. It was owned by the Fitzpatrick family until it was given to Bob and Beryl Waddington in 1982 following Malachi Fitzpatrick's retirement.

The bar was bought by John and Suzanne Spencer in 1994. Commonly referred to as Fitzpatrick's, it was renamed from Herbal Health to Fitzpatrick's Herbal Health in 1998.

In 2003, sarsaparilla was briefly unavailable at Fitzpatrick's due to the presence of sassafras, an ingredient traditionally present in the drink and a potential carcinogen. It was subsequently reintroduced with a modified formulation.

On 15 July 2007, Fitzpatrick's was featured in How We Built Britain, a documentary about British architecture and social history.

It briefly closed between January and March 2016. Following a refurbishment, for which the bar was closed between July and August of that year, it started selling cake and milkshakes and incorporating their existing drinks into the recipes.

On 18 November 2021, Mr Fitzpatrick's made an appearance in an episode of Celebrity Antiques Road Trip.

== Products ==
Drinks produced by Mr Fitzpatrick's include sarsaparilla, dandelion and burdock, cream soda and ginger beer, along with more exclusive cordials such as blood tonic.

== See also ==
- Temperance movement in the United Kingdom
