= Dandelion and burdock =

Carbonated drink

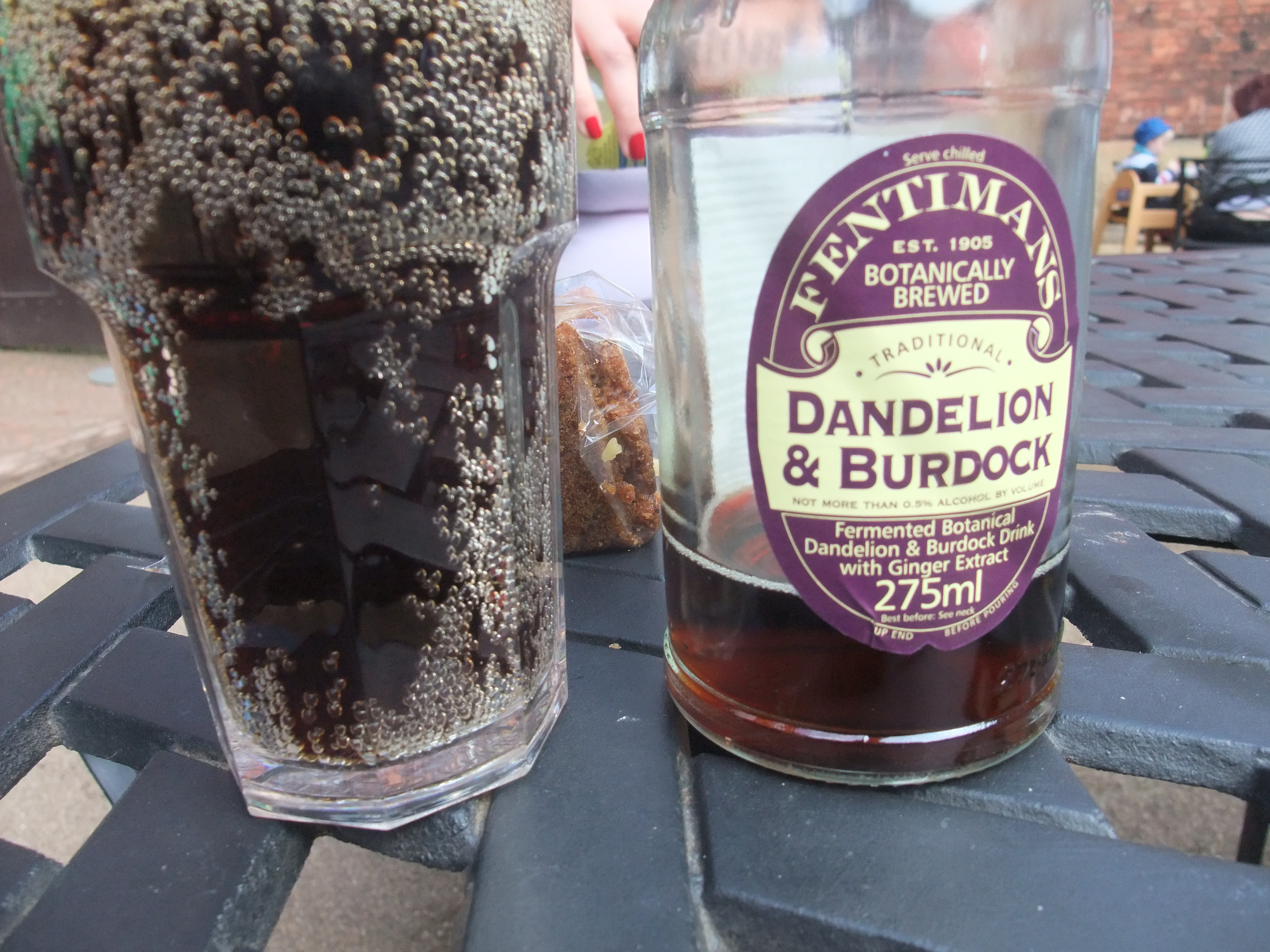
- A bottle and glass of Fentimans Dandelion & Burdock
- Type: Carbonated soft drink
- Manufacturer: Various
- Origin: United Kingdom
- Colour: Caramel
- Related products: Root beer, sarsaparilla

Dandelion and burdock is a beverage originating and commonly consumed in the British Isles since the Middle Ages. It was originally a type of light mead but over the years has evolved into the carbonated soft drink commercially available today. Traditionally, it was made from fermented dandelion (Taraxacum officinale) and burdock (Arctium lappa) roots, hence the name.

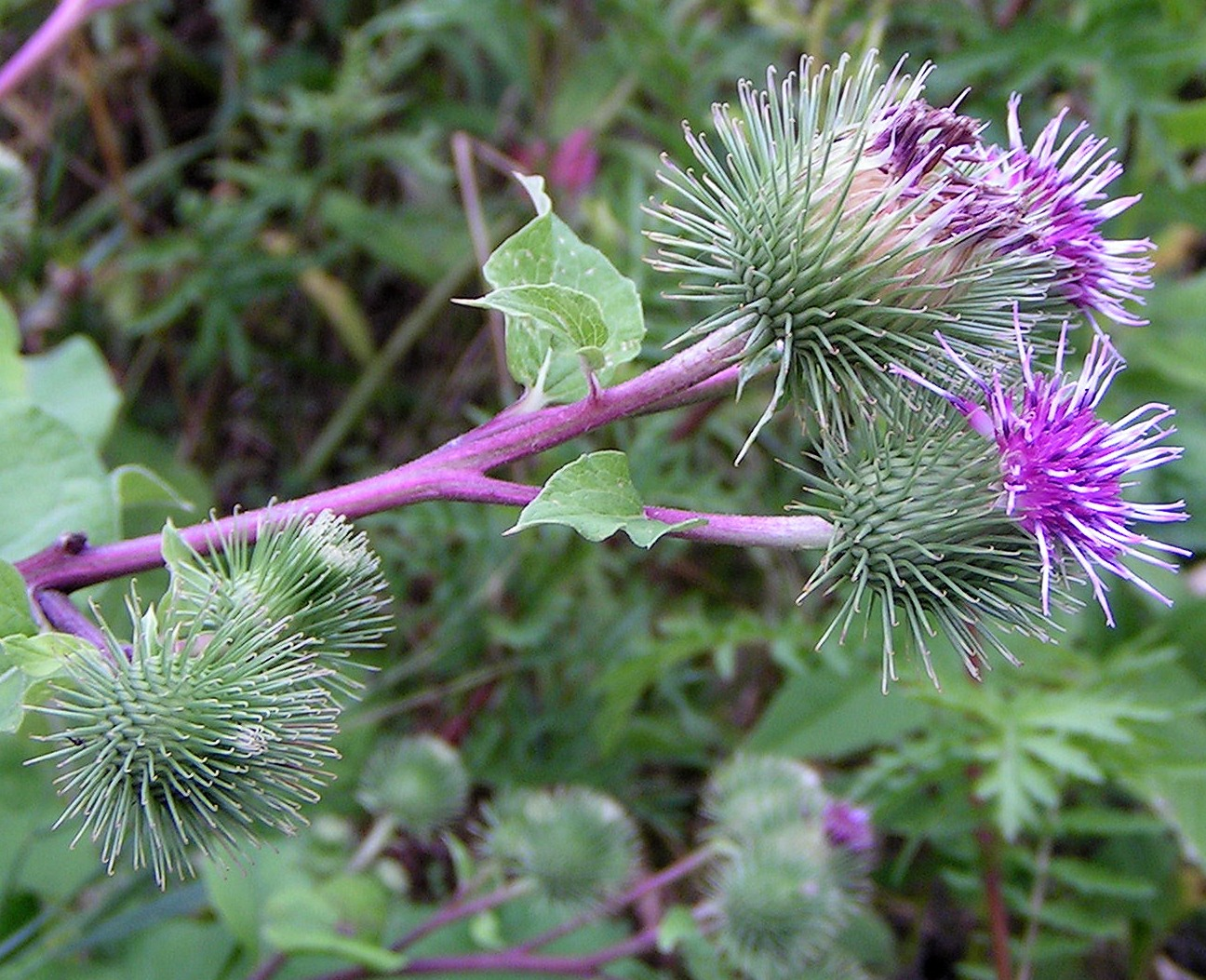
A flowering dandelion (left) and a burdock plant (right)

== History ==
Dandelion and burdock shares an origin with a number of drinks originally made from lightly fermented root extracts, such as root beer and sarsaparilla, supposedly as a health benefit. The dominant flavour in these other drinks is usually sassafras or wintergreen, both now derived artificially rather than from the plant itself, in part because during the 1960s, safrole, the major component of the volatile oil of sassafras, was found to be carcinogenic in rats. All of these drinks, while tasting similar, do have their own distinct flavour. Dandelion and burdock is most similar in flavour to sarsaparilla.

== Imitations and variants ==
Ben Shaw, a Huddersfield businessman, founded a company that made and sold the drink, first in Yorkshire and then throughout Britain, between 1871 and 1993. Afterward, the enterprise passed through several hands and is now owned by Refresco, who still make and sell the drink.

Fentimans, a beverage company based in the United Kingdom, offers a version of the naturally brewed dandelion and burdock drink, containing extracts of both plants (although its main ingredients are sugar and pear juice concentrate).

A.G. Barr, known for its Scottish soft drink Irn-Bru, produces a version of dandelion and burdock under the name D'n'B, with the slogan "Tall, dark and drinksome".

The last of the UK's original temperance bars, Mr Fitzpatrick's in Rawtenstall, Rossendale, which opened in the 1890s, still produces its dandelion and burdock to an original recipe brought over from Ireland at the end of the 19th century.

== See also ==
- Dandelion tea
- List of brand name soft drinks products
- List of soft drink flavours

== Bibliography ==
- Lewis-Stempel, John (2010), The Wild Life, Black Swan, ISBN 978-0-5527-7460-4
