= White Rock Beverages =

American beverage company

- Type: Privately held corporation
- Industry: Beverages
- Founded: 1871 Waukesha, Wisconsin
- Founder: H.M. Colver
- Headquarters: Whitestone, New York, United States
- Products: Seltzer, soft drinks
- Owner: Morgan Family
- Website: www.whiterockbeverages.com

White Rock Beverages (White Rock Products Corporation) is an American beverage company located in Whitestone, Queens, New York City. The company was established in 1871 by pharmacist H.M. Colver in Waukesha, Wisconsin. The Potawatomi Indians and settlers believed that the nearby White Rock natural spring had special medicinal powers, so White Rock Beverages started out as a destination for vacationers and health seekers. By 1876, the company was bottling and distributing the natural spring water throughout the country.

== History ==
By 1923, White Rock Beverages was one of the largest producers of mineral water in the United States. The company also produced ginger ale and other soft drinks. Its property value was then calculated at $7,311,767 ($138,166,691 today). This included land holdings and bottling plants.

In 1941, the company which manufactured White Rock soft drinks was called White Rock Mineral Springs Company.

An ad for White Rock Sparkling Water was the very first ad to appear in Gourmet magazine (January 1941).

== Marketing with Santa Claus ==
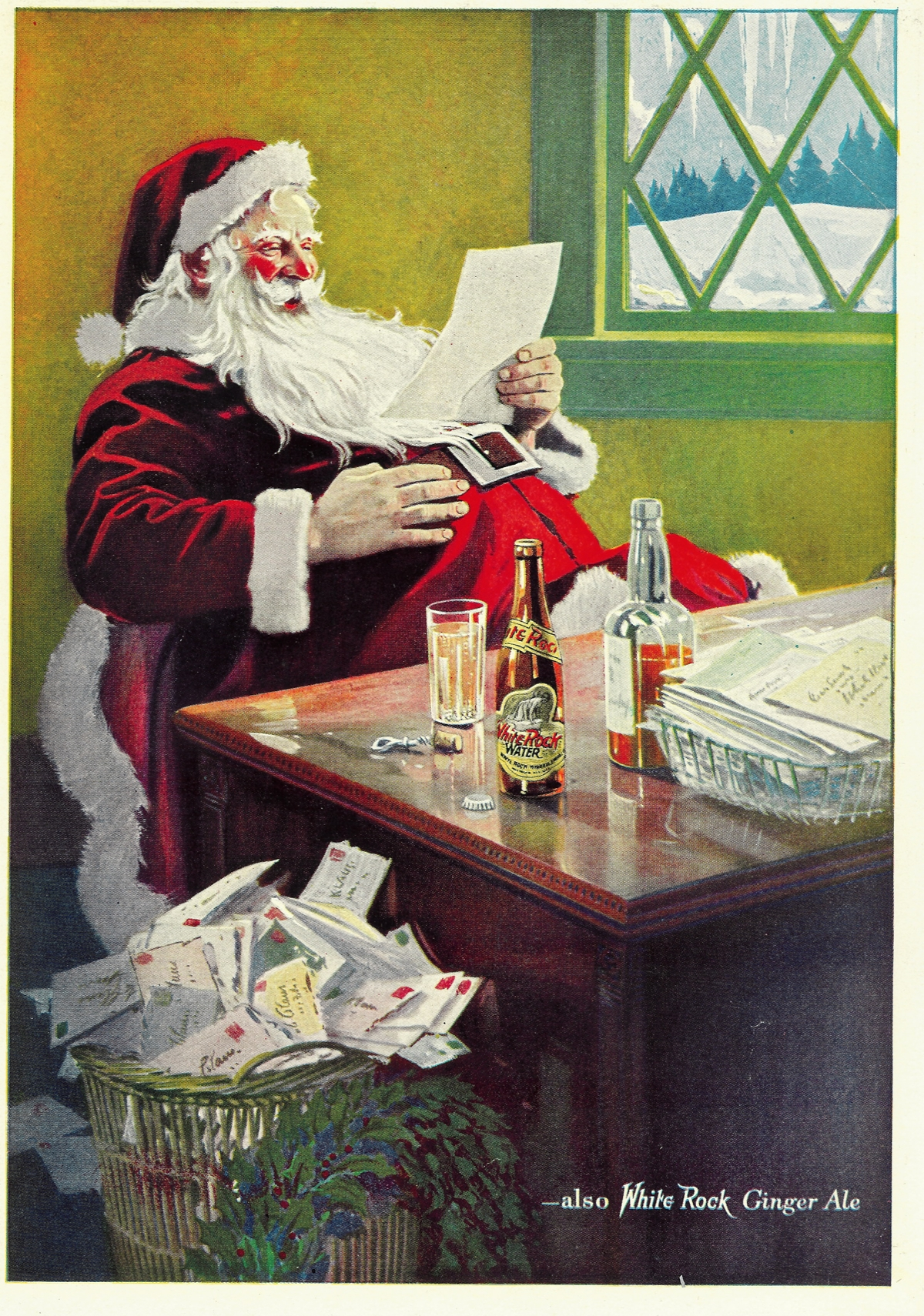
December 1923 advertisement of Santa Claus drinking White Rock's ginger ale

Coca-Cola is frequently credited with the "invention" of the modern image of Santa Claus as an old man in red-and-white garments; however, White Rock predated Coca-Cola's usage of Santa in advertisements for soft drinks. In 1923, the company used Santa to advertise its ginger ale after first using him to sell mineral water in 1915.

== Psyche logo ==
The company has used the image of Psyche as its logo for over 120 years. The company purchased the rights to a painting titled Psyche at Nature's Mirror, by Paul Thumann, at the Chicago World's Fair in 1893.

== Brand portfolio ==
White Rock Cola
- Type: Soft drink
- Manufacturer: White Rock Beverages
- Variants: Diet
- Related products: Coca-Cola; Pepsi Cola
- Website: www.whiterockbeverages.com

White Rock

- Seltzer Water: Plain, Lemon-Lime, Mandarin Orange, Black Cherry, Raspberry, Cucumber, Watermelon
- Mixers: Ginger Ale, Diet Ginger Ale, Club Soda, Tonic Water, Diet Tonic Water
- Organic: Passion Orange, Raspberry Crème, Red Peach
- Soda: Cola, Root Beer, Cream Soda, Lemon-Lime, Orange, Grape, Black Cherry

Sioux City

- Sarsaparilla – promoted on the label as "The Granddaddy of all Root Beers"
- Diet Sarsaparilla
- Root Beer
- Birch Beer
- Ginger Beer
- Cream Soda
- Black Cherry
- Orange Cream
- Prickly Pear
- Berry Berry – a mixture of blueberry and raspberry flavors
- Cherries 'n Mint

Olde Brooklyn:

- Williamsburg Root Beer
- Diet Williamsburg Root Beer
- Bay Ridge Birch Beer
- Coney Island Cream Soda
- Diet Coney Island Cream Soda
- Flatbush Orange Soda
- Greenpoint Grape Soda
- Red Hook Raspberry
- Brighton Beach Black Cherry
- Park Slope Ginger Ale

== In popular culture ==
Psyche at Nature's Mirror by Paul Thumann

White Rock was widely used in speakeasies during Prohibition, and the brand appears in literary works and films set during the era.

Author Carroll John Daly mentions White Rock in stories featuring his hard-boiled detective Race Williams. In the 1927 mystery The Egyptian Lure, Race enters a speakeasy and is worried about both the possibility of getting bad liquor or being slipped a Mickey Finn. He speaks to a waiter:

"Bring me a split of White Rock," I told him. "And be sure the cap's tightly on. I carry my own opener." The hurt expression of his fat face when he thought I'd questioned the honest intention of the house, lifted when I slipped him a five-case note—which was good pay for the water, but not too much if the cap was securely fastened. No—I didn't suspect the joint, but I hate to put anyone in the way of temptation."

In Wallace Thurman's novel The Blacker the Berry, a party of three, including the heroine Emma Lou, orders three bottles of White Rock in a Harlem cabaret.

In the pre-Code film Men Call It Love, Norman Foster's character asks his butler, "Haven't you been with us long enough to know to always keep a supply of White Rock handy?" The butler stutters, "Why—why sir..." and opens the icebox, revealing it to be full of bottles of White Rock, with the Psyche logo clearly visible.

Edward Everett Horton plays multiple characters in 1931's Lonely Wives, who ask several times for "a White Rock."

Whiskey and White Rock are imbibed in James M. Cain's novel The Postman Always Rings Twice and Rex Stout's second Nero Wolfe novel The League of Frightened Men.

White Rock is mentioned repeatedly by name as the mixer of choice for characters in the William Crane series of detective novels by Jonathan Latimer.

In Brad Strickland and John Bellairs' 1994 novel The Drum, the Doll, and the Zombie, Dr. Coote is described as crouching on his bed "like the White Rock girl on her stone."

In Paul Auster's novel 4 3 2 1, "the girl on the White Rock bottle" plays a central role in the protagonist's early sexual awakening.

Orders for Sioux City sarsaparilla bookend the film The Big Lebowski.
