= Fentimans =

Botanical brewery based in Hexham, England

Fentimans Ltd
- Location: Hexham, England, UK
- Opened: 1988; 1905 (original company)
- Closed: 1960s (original company)
- Owner: A.G. Barr
- Website: www.fentimans.com

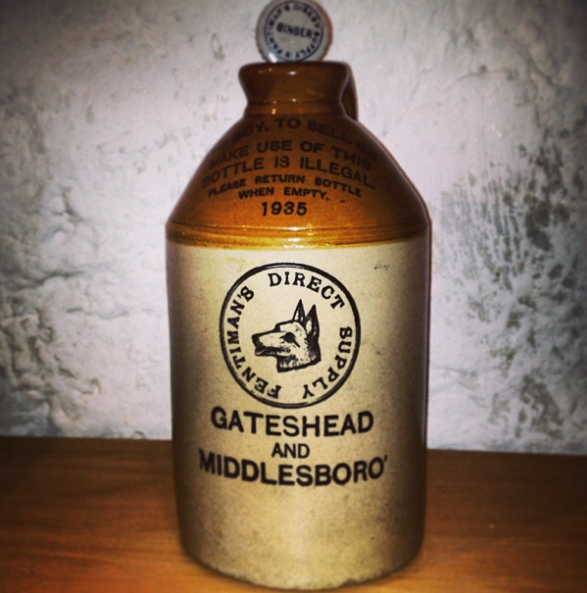
One of the homemade stone jars known as 'Grey Hens'

Fentimans is a botanical brewery based in Hexham, England.

== History ==
Thomas Fentiman, an iron puddler from Cleckheaton, England, acquired a recipe for botanically brewed ginger beer in 1905 when a fellow tradesman approached Fentiman for a loan. The loan was never repaid so Thomas became the owner of the recipe. The firm became a door-to-door ginger beer sales company using a horse-drawn vehicle for transport. His ginger beer was stored in handmade stone jars known as 'grey hens', all stamped with the Fentimans mascot based on Thomas' German Shepherd dog 'Fearless' who won the Crufts obedience class twice in 1933 and 1934. The botanically brewed ginger beer became popular quickly and the business grew, with several brewing and production facilities being opened in the North of England.

The company fell on hard times as supermarkets entered the soft drinks market. As a result, sales of the grey hens slumped and the company closed down in the mid 1960s. But in 1988, Thomas Fentiman's great grandson re-established the business with a mission to produce drinks in the original way, using the traditional ginger beer recipe and 100% natural ingredients. From then, with old-style products and vintage goods becoming more popular, Fentimans has enjoyed a wave of popularity.

Since 1905, Fentimans has brewed botanical sodas with ingredients including roots, bark and flowers, and with the exception of adding new flavours, Fentimans make their sodas the same as at the turn of the century. Some production processes have been updated, for example, pasteurisation to extend the shelf life of the drinks. This causes the loss of some carbon dioxide, so mild carbonation was introduced.

=== 21st century ===
Fentimans has franchised in the US, where products are manufactured in Pennsylvania and are available across North America. More than two-thirds of Fentimans' overseas sales are in Europe, with the bulk of the remainder in the US, Japan, South America, Canada and Russia. Both UK and US divisions use the same recipe and brewing methods to create Fentimans. North America has purchased identical brewery equipment to that used decades ago, to maintain the characteristic flavour. In recent times they have changed their recipe in the UK to include the sweetener Steviol glycosides.

Fentimans' range includes both gluten-free alcoholic ginger beer and a mixer range; mixers include tonic, diet tonic, rose lemonade, bitter lemonade and ginger ale.

=== Botanical brewing ===
Thomas Fentiman's botanical brewing is a technique using a combination of infusion, blending and fermentation of natural ingredients.

Thomas Fentiman's original recipe involved milling ginger roots before putting them into copper steam-jacketed pans and leaving them to simmer to release their flavour. Natural botanical ingredients such as herbs, natural flavourings, sugar, spring water and brewer's yeast were then added, thoroughly stirred, and boiled together. The liquid was then transferred into wooden vats and left to undergo the process of fermentation. The liquid went on fermenting and was then decanted from the wooden vats into the iconic handmade stone jars ('grey hens') where it would be ready to drink within seven days.

== Alcohol content ==
In 2009 the state of Maine in the United States banned the sale of Fentimans Victorian Lemonade to anyone aged under 21 after reclassifying it as an "Imitation Liquor". The ban was introduced after a schoolboy in the small town of Houlton, Maine, noticed the lemonade's label stated it contained "up to 0.5% alcohol" and showed his high school principal. They contacted the local police who went to the state’s liquor licensing officials and Maine's attorney general's office. Fentimans responded to the ban with a statement telling any concerned citizens of Houlton and law enforcement officers and officials to steer clear of the company's other naturally-fermented botanical soft drinks. Although the lemonade label states that the beverage may contain up to 0.5% alcohol by volume (below the soft drinks' alcohol limit legislated for in the United States of America), Fentimans said it was closer to 0.3%, the same as many common products, such as mouthwashes or chewing gums. A person would need to consume 200 fluid ounces (5.7 litres or 12 US pints) to equal the intoxication level from one beer.

== Products ==
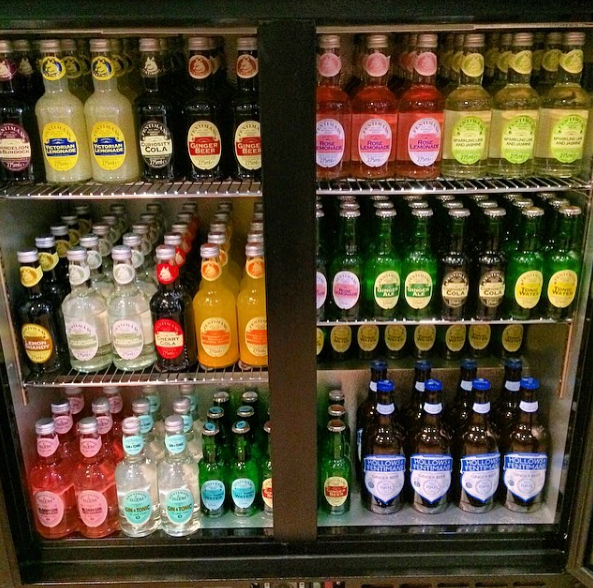
The whole Fentimans range

Fentimans' current products are:

=== Soft drinks (275ml/750ml) ===
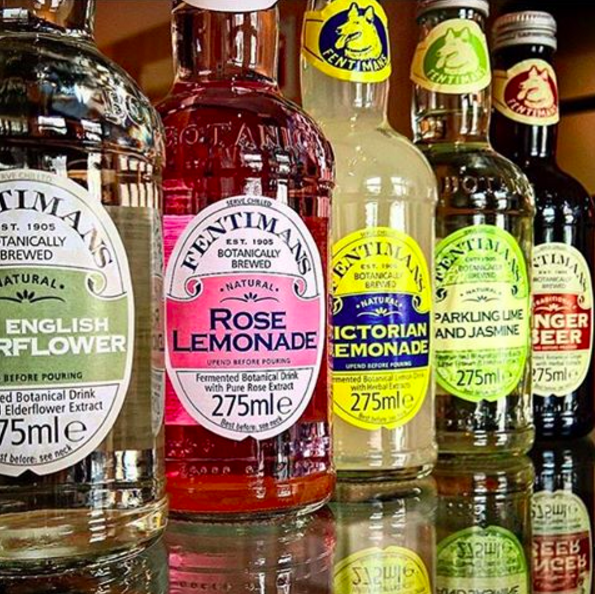
Some of the Fentimans 275ml range

- Curiosity Cola
- Cherry Cola
- Dandelion & Burdock
- Mandarin and Seville Orange Jigger
- Lemon Shandy
- Victorian Lemonade
- Rose Lemonade
- Traditional Ginger Beer
- Sparkling Lime and Jasmine
- Gently Sparkling Elderflower
- Old English Root Beer
- Apple and Blackberry
- Sparkling Raspberry
- Pink Ginger

=== Mixers (125 ml/500 ml) ===
- Ginger Ale
- Tonic Water/Light Tonic Water
- Rose Lemonade
- Curiosity Cola
- Pink Grapefruit Tonic Water
- Valencian Orange Tonic Water
- Connoisseurs Tonic Water
- Pink Rhubarb Tonic Water
- Oriental Yuzu Tonic
- Tropical Soda
- Elderflower & Rose Tonic

=== Craft beer ===
- Hollows & Fentimans Alcoholic Ginger Beer
