= Sioux City (soft drink) =

Line of specialized traditional soda beverages

- Type: Carbonated soft drink
- Distributor: Sioux City
- Origin: Sioux City, Iowa
- Introduced: 1971; 55 years ago
- Color: Various
- Related products: White Rock Beverages
- Website: Sioux City soft drinks

Sioux City Sarsaparilla

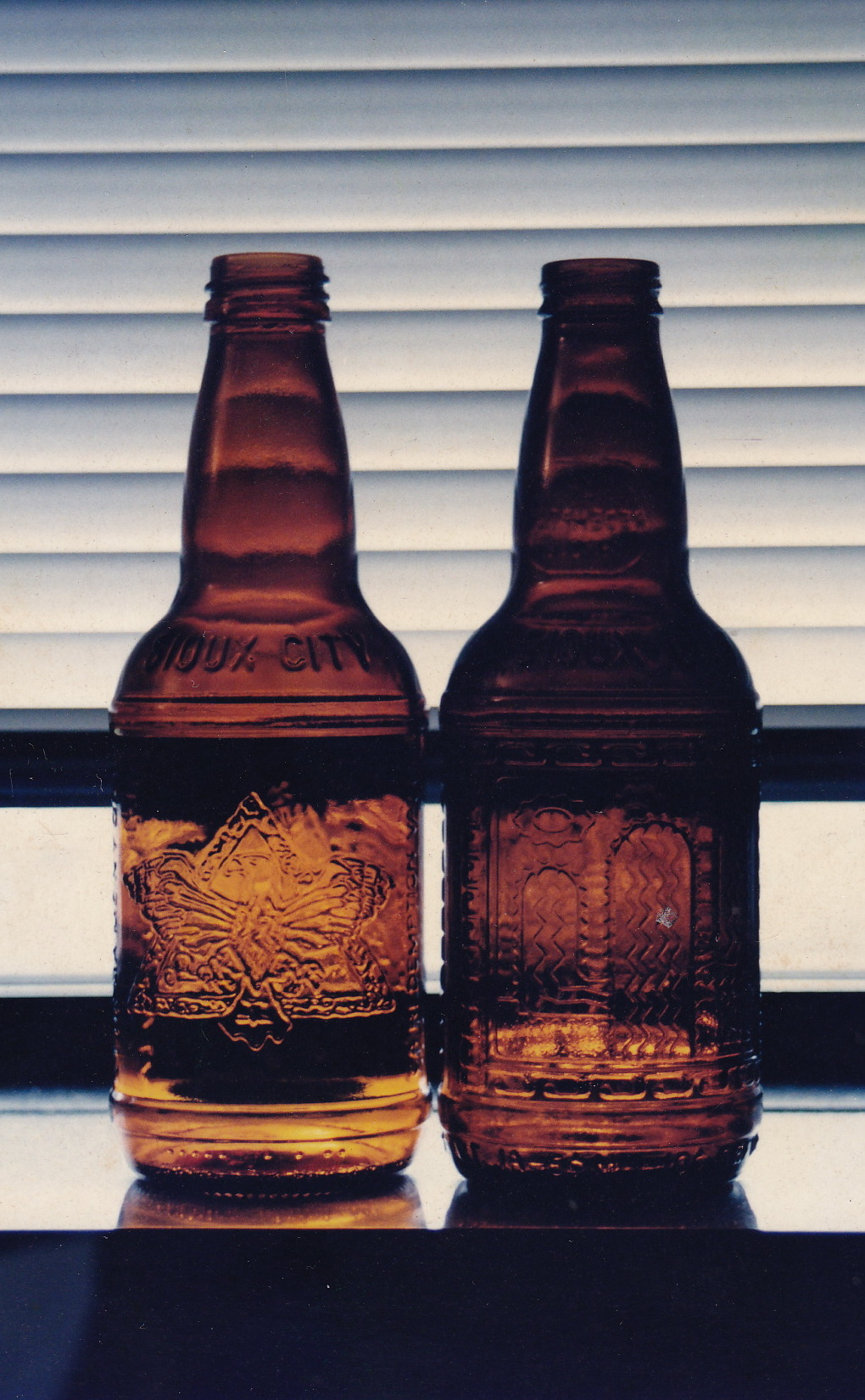
Two Sioux City Sarsaparilla bottles, in the style sold for decades, until the 2010s

Sioux City is a line of soft drinks manufactured and marketed by White Rock Beverages. The line debuted in 1971 with its Sarsaparilla variety, which was sold in both cans and bottles. In 1985, White Rock repackaged its Sioux City line with distinctive embossed bottles, helping the brand gain prominence in the emerging niche soft-drink market.

Sioux City "saloon style" soft drinks are available in a variety of flavors, including:

- Sarsaparilla – promoted on the label as "The Granddaddy of all Root Beers"
- Diet Sarsaparilla
- Root Beer
- Birch Beer
- Ginger Beer
- Cream Soda
- Black Cherry
- Orange Cream
- Prickly Pear
- Berry Berry – a mixture of blueberry and raspberry flavors
- Cherries 'n Mint

== Cultural references ==
"Sioux City Sarsaparilla" is a song by Children of Bodom's Alexi Laiho from the Finnish Guitar Heroes compilation album.

In the film The Big Lebowski, when the Stranger (Sam Elliott) asks the bowling alley bartender, "You got any good sarsaparilla?", Gary the bartender replies, "Sioux City?" to which the Stranger responds, "That's a good one." The last line in the movie is the Stranger asking the bartender if he has "any more of that good sarsaparilla".
