= Mary Hill of Gairbraid =

Mary Hill (1730–1809) was an heiress after whom the town of Maryhill, now a district of Glasgow, was named.

Mary inherited the Gairbraid Estate from her father, Hew Hill, who had no surviving male heirs. In 1763, she married Robert Graham. Generally spoken of as Captain Graham, Robert had been captured by the pirates of Algiers and was their prisoner for some time, being treated as a slave. On his return home there was considerable interest in his adventures and it was said that Mary was so impressed by his romantic story that she chose him for her husband.

Mary and Robert lived in Gairbraid House overlooking the River Kelvin. The original was built in 1688, but they replaced it one hundred years later when contemporaries described it as “a square house built by a square man”. It was demolished in the 1920s.

The Grahams ran into money troubles after speculating in coal-mining for which their land proved to be too damp. However, these were reversed when parliament approved the planning of the route of the Forth and Clyde Canal in 1768, which went through the estate. They were compensated for this and once the canal was completed, around 1790, their land along the canal suddenly became much more valuable. A village began to grow up and the Grahams feued more land for its development “from Glasgow to Garscube Bridge” with the condition that it would be “in all times called the town of Mary Hill”.

Mary and Robert had no male heirs either and their unmarried older daughter, Lilias, inherited the estate on Mary’s death. Their younger daughter, Janet, married Alexander Dunlop, a merchant in Greenock, and when Lilias died in 1836 it passed to their son, John Dunlop, who disposed of much of it.
