= Temperance bar =

Bar that does not serve alcohol

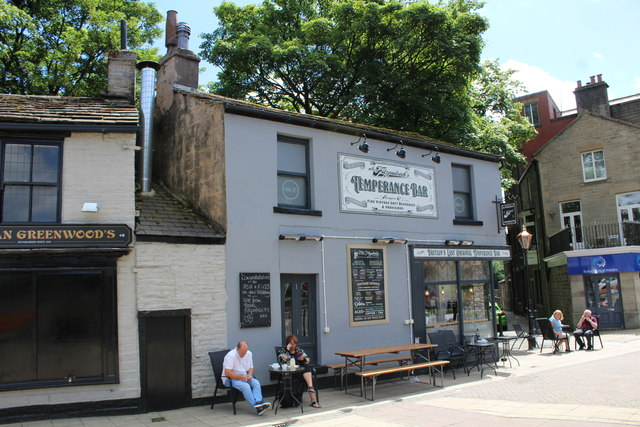
Mr Fitzpatrick's, the last remaining original temperance bar in Rawtenstall, England, that was established in the 1890s

A temperance bar, also known as an alcohol-free bar, sober bar, or dry bar, is a type of bar that does not serve alcoholic beverages. An alcohol-free bar can be a business establishment or located in a non-business environment or event, such as at a wedding. Alcohol-free bars typically serve non-alcoholic beverages, such as non-alcoholic cocktails known as mocktails, alcohol-free beer or low-alcohol beer, alcohol-free wine, juice, soft drinks and water. Popular temperance drinks include cream soda, dandelion and burdock, sarsaparilla, and Vimto, among others. Various foods may also be served.

== History ==
In the late 19th and early 20th centuries, a number of temperance bars were established in conjunction with various temperance organisations. Originally, these advocated a moderate approach to life, especially concerning the consumption of alcohol. Later they moved toward abstinence from alcohol. Temperance bars with full temperance licenses (allowing them to serve on Sundays despite English trading laws) were once common in many high streets and shopping areas in the North of England. The temperance movement had a massive following, fueled mainly by nonconformist Christian denominations, such as Methodists.

Temperance bars were the first outlet for the drinks Coca-Cola and Vimto in the early 20th century. They were also sometimes called "temperance taverns".

In the past, the bars quite often asked their patrons to sign a pledge of temperance, meaning that they would abstain from intoxicating liquors; today's wave of alcohol-free bars are frequented by both teetotalers and drinkers who wish to have fun in a drink-free environment. The recent popularity of alcohol-free bars is fueled by the declining usage of alcohol amongst the millennial generation, as well as the increased availability of information regarding the negative effects of alcohol on health.

== By country ==
=== Australia ===
In the 19th century coffee palaces were established as alcohol-free hotels in Australia.

=== New Zealand ===
In 2015 the first alcohol-free bar in New Zealand, located in Auckland and named Tap Bar, went out of business five weeks after opening due to a lack of consumer interest, in which few patrons showed up.

=== United Kingdom ===
Some cities in the United Kingdom have alcohol-free bars and public houses. The popularity of alcohol-free bars has increased in the United Kingdom, and they are "often funded by anti-alcoholism charities."

Mr Fitzpatrick's in Rawtenstall is one of the first and original temperance bars surviving from the late 1800s, when it was established. The Fitzpatricks came to Lancashire from Ireland in the 1880s. A family of many herbalists, they built a family-run chain of shops throughout Lancashire. These shops dealt in their non-alcoholic drinks, sold herbal remedies, and cordial bottles. At their peak, the Fitzpatrick family owned 24 shops, all brewing drinks to the original recipes from Ireland. As new drinks came from America, the temperance bars slowly waned. Fitzpatrick's, supported by loyal customers, survived. The Rawtenstall branch of Fitzpatrick's was run from 1891 until 1980 by family members. It is now run by new owners, with the objective of returning Fitzpatrick's Cordials to the market. Following a brief closure in early 2016, Fitzpatrick's reopened for business on 25 March 2016.

Mr Fitzpatrick's is notable for its old copper hot water dispenser which was originally a fixture at the Astoria Ballroom in Rawtenstall. It has also won an award as the country's "Best Sarsaparilla Brewer", and an award for its dandelion and burdock, a year later.

In 2013, a new temperance bar opened in Rotherham, the Whistle Stop Sweet Shop & Temperance Bar.

An alcohol-free bar named "The Brink" opened in Liverpool in 2011. The Brink is also a drug-free bar, and is run by the charity Action on Addiction with support from the Big Lottery Fund.

An alcohol-free bar named Redemption is located at the base of the Trellick Tower in North Kensington, London, England. It originated as a pop-up restaurant, and opened as a permanent establishment in July 2015. Redemption also serves vegan food that is locally sourced, and its menu is based upon providing nutritional foods and beverages. Its owners have stated that it is a "sober and cruelty-free bar." Redemption also utilizes a zero waste policy. The Netil House is another alcohol-free bar located in London.

Sobar in Nottingham is an alcohol-free bar operated by a charity, Double Impact, which works with both alcohol and drug addiction. It received funding from the Big Lottery Fund and employs people who have been addicts.

In January 2020, BrewDog established BrewDog AF, an alcohol-free bar on Old Street in Shoreditch, London. Alcoholic drinks were subsequently introduced to the venue, which was rebranded to BrewDog Old Street. It closed in 2022.

An alcohol-free bar named Universe exists in Coventry, England near Coventry University.

==== Scotland ====
A temporary bar named DRY was active in Edinburgh in early 2017. More recently, the Black Axe Throwing Company operated an alcohol-free bar in 2023 until November of that year. On 22 October 2025, a bar called SOBR opened in Aberdeen.

=== United States ===
The Other Side is an alcohol-free bar located in Crystal Lake, Illinois, a Chicago suburb, that strives to provide a place that is "exactly like a bar" for recovering alcoholics.

Getaway is an alcohol-free bar in Greenpoint, a neighborhood of Brooklyn, New York that opened in April 2019 and serves alcohol-free mixed drinks, shrubs, sodas, and teas.

Listen Bar is an alcohol-free bar in New York open one night every month. All their bartenders are musicians, including special guests Savoir Adore and Sir Babygirl. They have risen to popularity following favorable reviews in Refinery29, VICE and features on the Today Show, Good Morning America and more.

Awake was an alcohol-free bar in Denver, Colorado. It has been featured in Good Morning America, Forbes, AP, Sunset, and the Denver Post.

== Popular drinks served ==
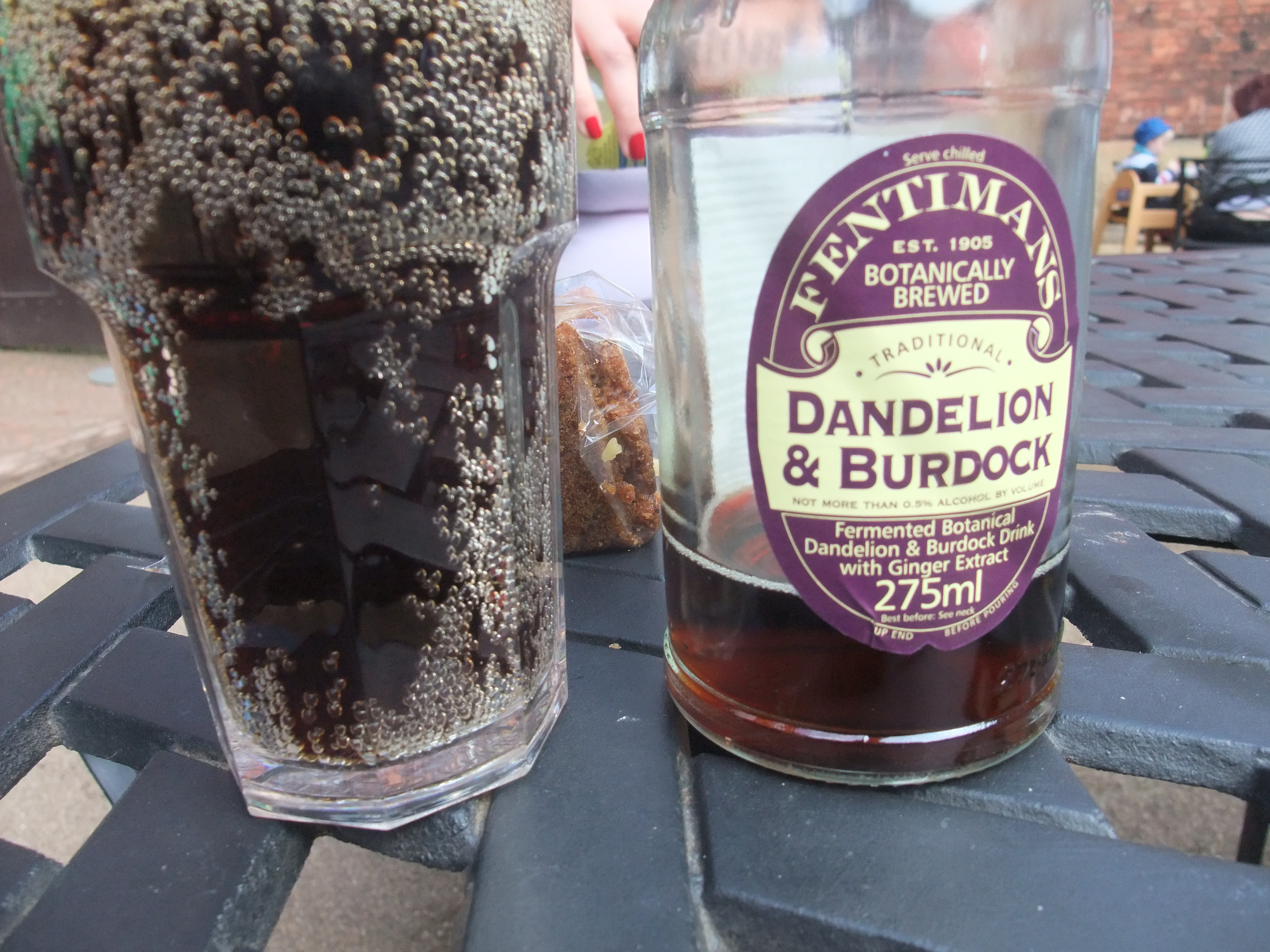
Dandelion and burdock, a temperance drink served at many alcohol-free bars

Temperance bars serve a variety of non-alcoholic mixed drinks, including:

- Cola
- Cream soda
- Dandelion and burdock
- Ginger beer
- Milk
- Sarsaparilla
- Shrubs
- Vimto

== See also ==
- Juice bar
- Long-term effects of alcohol consumption
- Teetotalism
- Temperance movement
- Temperance songs
