= Fentimans Curiosity Cola =

Gourmet soft drink

- Type: Cola
- Manufacturer: Fentimans
- Origin: United Kingdom
- Flavour: Cola
- Related products: Fentimans

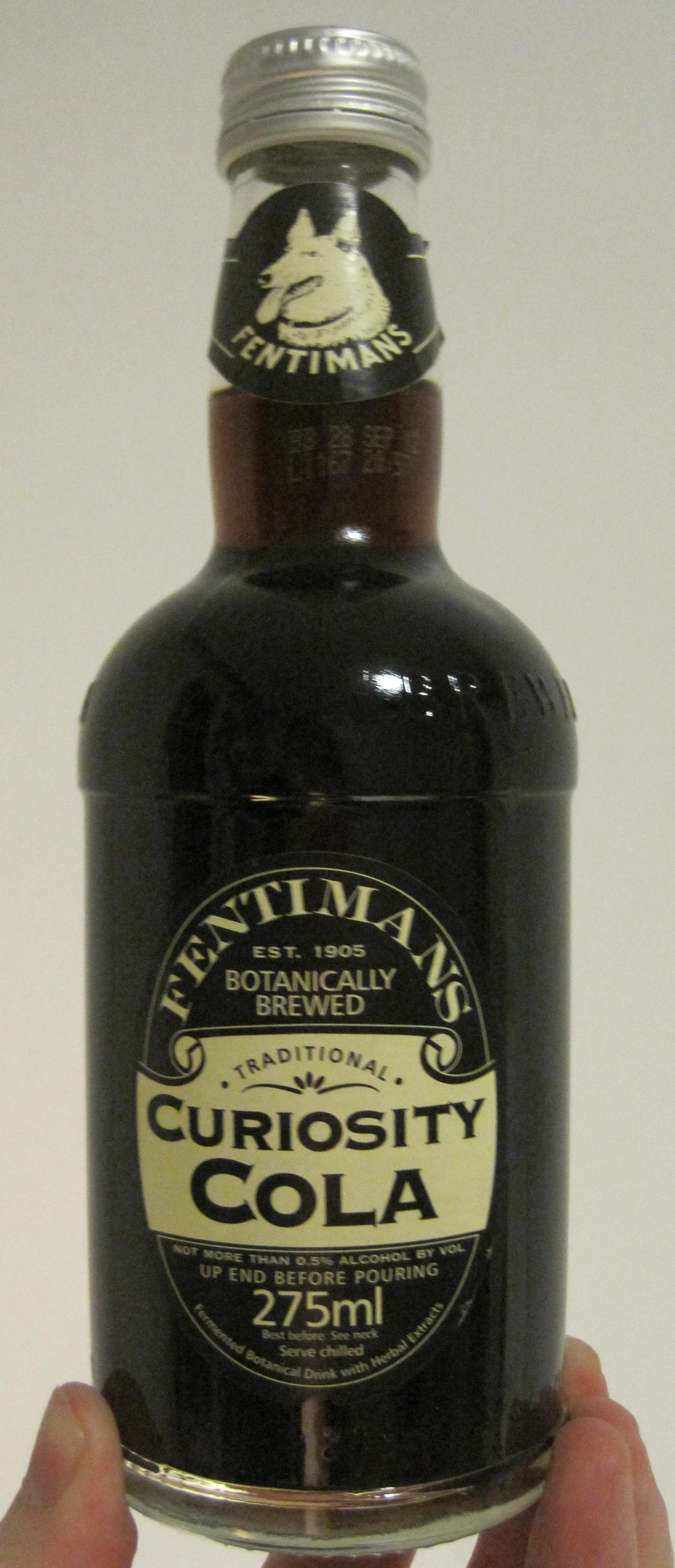
A bottle of Fentimans Curiosity Cola

Fentimans Curiosity Cola is a botanically brewed carbonated cola soft drink, a product of British brewery Fentimans. It is sold in 275 ml and 750 ml glass bottles.

== Ingredients ==
Curiosity Cola is made using the following ingredients: carbonated water, fermented ginger root extract (water, glucose syrup, ginger root, pear juice concentrate, yeast), sugar, flavourings, colour: caramel (E150d), phosphoric acid (E338), caffeine. In 2023, Fentimans started adding artificial sweeteners to their cola.

== Botanical brewing process ==
Botanical brewing is a simple process involving herbs and plant roots. Thomas Fentiman's original recipe involved milling ginger roots before putting them into copper steam-jacketed pans and leaving them to simmer to release their flavour. Herbs, natural flavourings, sugar, brewer's yeast and spring water were then added, and the liquid was transferred into wooden vats where it was left to ferment. The liquid went on fermenting after it was bottled and corked in stone jars where it would fully mature and be ready to drink by the end of the week. The production processes have been updated through the addition of mild carbonation to replace the carbon dioxide lost during pasteurization to provide longer life.

== Nutrition information ==
100 g of Curiosity Cola contains 140 kilojoules (34 kilocalories) energy, less than 1 gram of protein, 7.8 g total carbohydrate, of which 7.8 g are sugars. There are 0 grams of fat or fibre, and a trace of sodium.
