= Harriet A. Glazebrook =

English temperance advocate (1847–1937)

Harriet Ann Glazebrook (1847 – 16 December 1937) was an English temperance advocate, author and editor, and the Mayoress of Cardiff (1896–7).

== Biography ==
Harriet Ann Glazebrook was the second of six children born to Reverend Benjamin Glazebrook and Betty (nee Eckersley) in Glossop, Derbyshire, England in 1847. Her siblings were Sarah, Alice, Florence, Hanna, and Benjamin Jr.

Harriet's calling as a temperance advocate began in her youth, when she became a Band of Hope pledge, and continued throughout her life. The Glazebrooks were avid supporters of the Temperance movement. Her father was himself an early reformer.

"Alice Lea (a.k.a.) the Lips that touch liquor shall never touch mine" was considered to be her first work, as well as her most well-known poem, on the subject of Temperance, published in 1867. The last verse of the poem, however, was not her original script. It is an adaptation of the last verse from a poem written by George W. Young, as a broadside. Young's line was written as: "… And the lips that touch liquor must never touch mine".

Glazebrook was Mayoress of Cardiff from 1896 to 1897. Her term coincided with the period of the Diamond Jubilee, Queen Victoria’s 60th year of reign. Honorific addresses for Harriet's political role were either 'Madame' or 'Lady' Mayoress.

== Marriage and children ==
In 1878, Harriet was married to Reverend Ebenezer Beavan, a Methodist minister and, later, Mayor of Cardiff (1896–1897). A widower, the Reverend had three children with his first wife, also named Harriet (nee ‘Prewett’): Harriet (1866–1954), Sarah Ann (1868–1968), and Edwin (1872–1925). With Harriet Glazebrook, Ebenezer had three more children: Thomas A., (1881–1920), Florence, (1885–death date unknown), and Alice Rose, (1889–death date unknown).

== The Mayoress Chain ==
In honour of Queen Victoria's Diamond Jubilee, the Mayor, Mr. Ebenezer Beavan, proposed the commission of a 'Mayoress Chain and Band' as a tribute by the people of Cardiff. Among other ornamentations representing Cardiff, its counties, and Wales, the chain and band design featured an enamelled portrait of Her Majesty Queen Victoria. The motion was approved. A committee of the ladies was formed for the purpose of fundraising, installing Harriet (Mayoress Beavan) as committee President. In the same tradition of the Mayor’s Chain, the name of each Mayoress "...for the time being." was engraved on a link of the chain, the first name being 'Mrs. E. Beavan'.

In July 1897, The Band of Hope hosted their Jubilee demonstration where Harriet (Mrs. E. Beavan, acting in her role as Mayoress of Cardiff) received donations to the Band of Hope Union from the children in the procession. It was at this event that Harriet (Mayoress Beavan) wore the chain and badge in public for the first time.

On 2 November 1897, the chain and badge was formally presented to, and accepted by, the Cardiff Council.

== Temperance work and recognition ==
Both Harriet and Councillor Ebenezer are listed as committee members in support of bills presented in the House of Common, 1887, intended to enact further Temperance legislation.

Harriet was recognized in The temperance movement and its workers: A record of social, moral, religious, and political progress, Vol. IV, by P.T. Winskill for her written works in support of the Temperance movement including poetry, ballads, dramas, temperance-based, fiction, reciters (primarily for use by Temperance societies and Band of Hope sobriety organizations) as well as her contributions of music and recitation.

== Death ==
Glazebrook died on 16 December 1937, in Cardiff, Glamorgan, Wales.

== Selected works ==
She published variously as Harriet Glazebrook, Harriet Ann Glazebrook, Harriet A. Glazebrook, H. A. Glazebrook, Harriet A. Beavan, Mrs. Ebenezer Beavan, and Mrs. E. Beavan (often mistaken with 'Mrs. E. Beavan [nee: 'Shaw']', Belfast, Ireland]):

- 1868: Olga Noromme: A Cornish Story, Harriet E. [sic] Glazebrook, (The juvenile companion and Sunday-school hive, Vol. XXI, 1868)
- 1874: Readings and recitations (chiefly upon temperance) (incl. 'Recitations in Verse'), Harriet A. Glazebrook, (John Kempster & Co., 1874)
- 1883: The Brooklet Reciter for Temperance Societies and Band of Hope, H. A. Glazebrook, (National Temperance Publication Depot., 1883)
- 1901: The "Bobs" Reciter: for bands of hope, temperance societies and Sunday schools, Harriet A. Beavan, (publisher unknown, 1901)
- 1928: Dialogues for the temperance platform (incl. "Too Old for Band of Hope", "Taking a tavern", and "Daddy's shoeless pet"), Harriet A. Beavan: United Kingdom Band of Hope Union, (publisher unknown., 1928)
