= Badak =

Indonesian soft drink

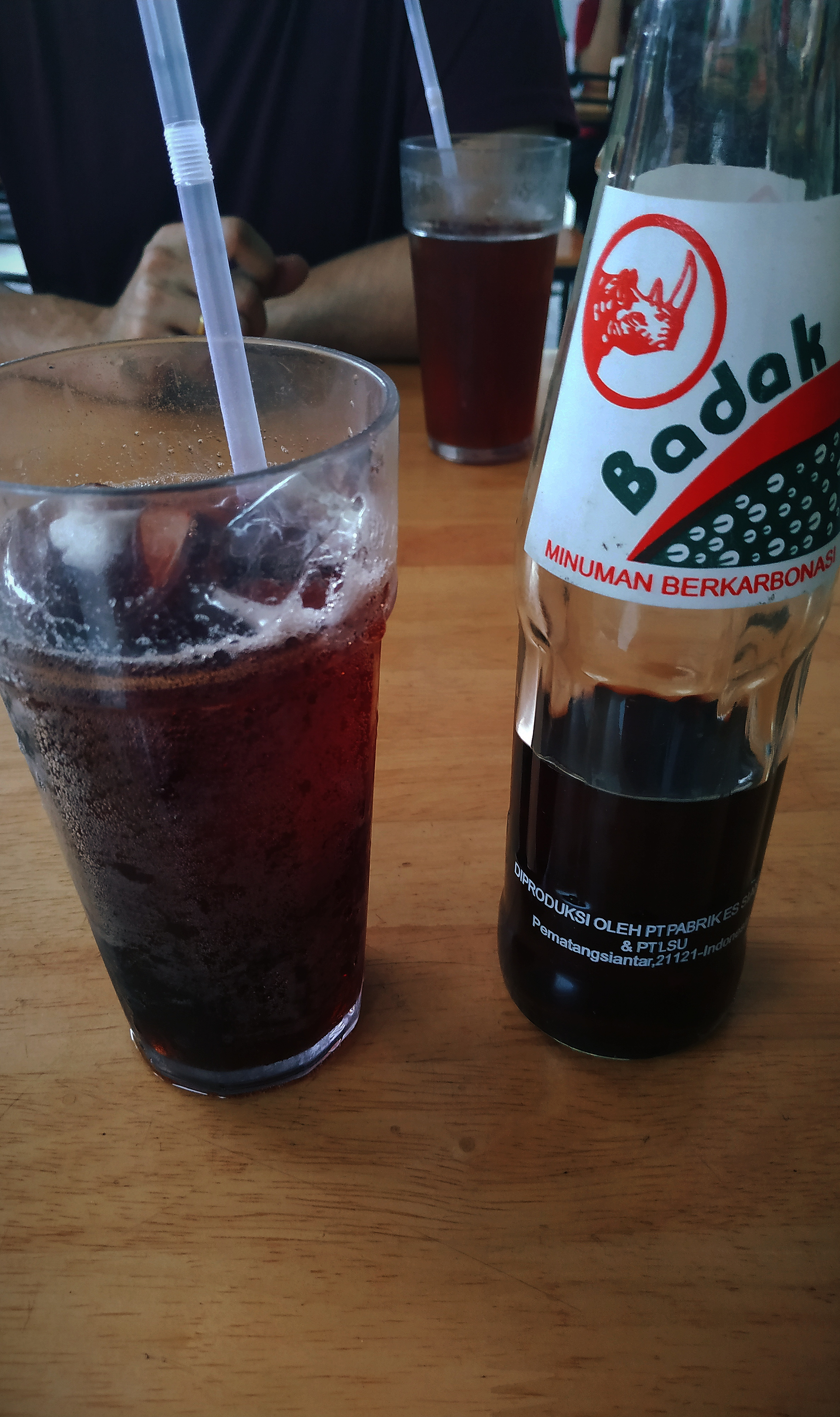
- A Badak sarsaparilla-flavor bottle, with most of the content being transferred to an iced cup. This is the traditional way of drinking.
- Type: Cola
- Manufacturer: PT Pabrik Es Siantar
- Origin: Indonesia
- Introduced: 1916; 109 years ago
- Colour: Caramel E-150d
- Flavor: Tonic water, sarsaparilla

Badak, also known as Cap Badak (lit. 'Rhinoceros Brand'), is a cola manufactured by PT Pabrik Es Siantar (lit. 'Siantar Ice Factory') in 1916. Native to Pematangsiantar, it is one of the most iconic drinks in the North Sumatra area, particularly Medan.

== History ==
Badak was manufactured by NV Ijs Fabriek Siantar, the later PT Pabrik Es Siantar, the first Indonesian soft drink company. A Hallauan chemist named Heinrich Surbeck went to Pematangsiantar, North Sumatra in 1916 and started manufacturing the cola. Surbeck chose the location because in the 20th century, new farms were formed around the area, and Pematangsiantar became a cargo hub between the provincial capital Medan and other cities, as well as the richness of the clean water. Off from their main project, Ijs Fabriek Siantar also helped the area's electrical distribution; the company was highly respected by locals, that a film theatre reserved seven seats for the company's board.

The company started with manufacturing ice cubes as well as passion fruit concentrates, which were later discontinued. Badak was later launched in the 1920s. Badak is Indonesian for rhinoceros; named so by the company because they said its hard skin and strong horns meant that Badak would stand strong against other international rivals. However at the same time, rivals like Coca-Cola and Fanta were beginning mass distribution across the country, burdening the company and especially Surbeck, who was killed by the Indonesians who fought against the Dutch post-independence. Factory worker Elman Tanjung replaced Surbeck's role as chief executive officer (CEO), and after the company's nationalization in 1971, Julius Hutabarat took the role. Currently, his son Ronald Hutabarat assumes as CEO.

Julius’ leadership was credited to Badak's resurgence, with eight new flavors introduced: orange, grape, pineapple, American ice cream soda, tonic water, coffee, raspberry, and sarsaparilla. The last flavor was the most successful of them all, and was imported to Surbeck's home country, Switzerland. However, for the other flavors, distribution was limited to only Sumatra and parts of Java, especially the capital Jakarta. During its golden era, around the 1970s up to 1980s, production surged up to 40 thousand crates per month. However, as demands lowered, production was also lowered to 500 per month. Six flavors were also discontinued due to high budget and the overwhelmingly recurring process of cleaning the machines every four hours, leaving only the tonic water and sarsaparilla flavor still being manufactured. Health concerns about soft drinks also contributed to the decline, although many parents who fears doctors used to prescribe bottles of Badak to their children. Many of them claimed to have healed.

Badak's production was also slowly declining as of 2010, although many people, particularly those in the North Sumatra area, still consumed it. There is said to be an Internet fanbase dedicated to the drink. Concerned over its decline, many investors have been working with Pabrik Es Siantar to ensure another resurgence.

== Bottle and ingredients ==
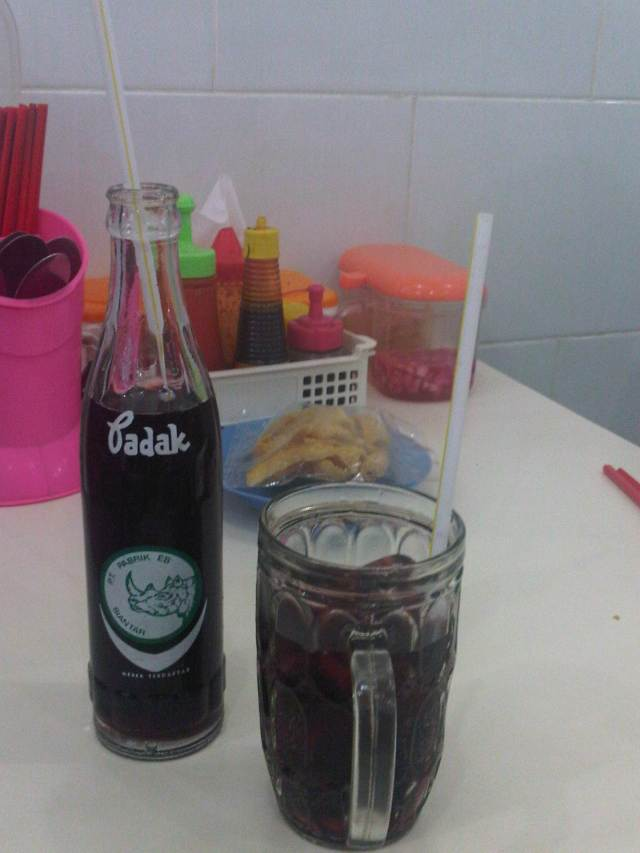
Another version of Badak's bottle

Badak is made of 100ml of water, 80 mg of carbon dioxide, 5g of sodium nitrate, 5g of sodium, and 20 mg of sulfate. The Badak bottle is made of hard glass, in order to keep the carbon dioxide in the drink. Its old fruit flavors were made by cooking sugar for some time, before being added with sucrose, clean water, and citric acid. Finally, it was mixed with water and carbon dioxide. In some places, a milked Badak (Indonesian: Susu Badak) is offered, mixing condensed milk with the drink.
