= Lilias Graham of Gairbraid =

Lilias Graham (1762–1836) was a Scottish heiress and social activist.

== Early life ==
Graham was the eldest daughter of Robert and Mary Graham (née Hill). Her mother owned the Gairbraid estate (now the area of Glasgow known as Maryhill), which she inherited from her father, Hew Hill. Lilias had one sibling, a younger sister named Janet, who married Greenock merchant Alexander Dunlop. Their son, John Dunlop, went on to inherit the Gairbraid estate upon his aunt's death in 1836.

== Temperance movement ==
She is credited with helping to form the first temperance movement in Scotland alongside her nephew John Dunlop and her companion Betsy Allan. Dunlop was inspired to establish British Temperance Societies in Greenock and Maryhill in 1829 after becoming aware of the differences between Scotland and other parts of Europe in attitudes towards alcohol. Alexander Thomson wrote:

"In a recent visit to France, Mr Dunlop had been struck with the sobriety which seemed to prevail there amongst all classes; and he could not help contrasting this state of matters with the painful scenes that might be witnessed daily among his own countrymen."

Despite facing initial hostility and ridicule, Dunlop persisted in spreading the message of abstinence from alcohol throughout Scotland, and formed Britain's first temperance society in Gairbraid on 1 October 1829. At the time of the Society's formation, Maryhill had a total population of approximately 1300 and was home to 23 "licensed houses": one to every 57 residents of the area.
