= Sarsaparilla (drink) =

Soft drink

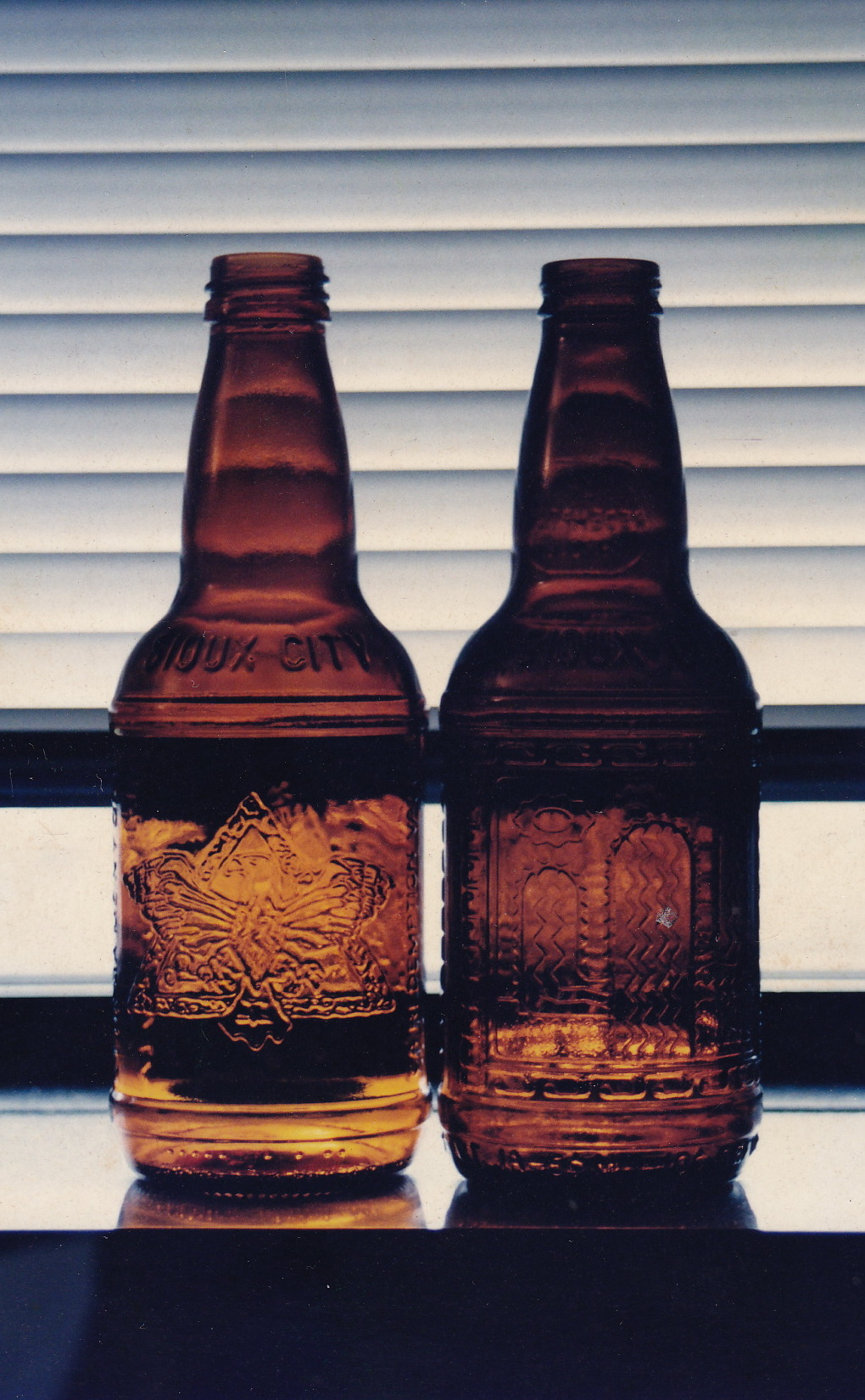
For decades, until the 2010s, the iconic Sioux City sarsaparilla bottle was sold in retail stores in the United States.

Sarsaparilla (UK: /ˌsɑːrspəˈrɪlə/, US also /ˌsæspəˈrɪlə/ sas-pə-RI-lə) is a soft drink originally made from the vine Smilax ornata (also called 'sarsaparilla') or other species of Smilax such as Smilax officinalis. In most Southeast Asian countries, it is known by the common name sarsi, and the trademarks Sarsi and Sarsae. It is similar in flavor to root beer. In the US, sarsaparilla is traditionally made with birch oil rather than the tropical plant.

== Etymology ==
Smilax ornata, a perennial trailing vine with prickly stems that is native to Mexico and Central America, is often used as the basis for the soft drink sarsaparilla. Common names include sarsaparilla, Honduran sarsaparilla, and Jamaican sarsaparilla.

It is known in Spanish as zarzaparrilla, which is derived from the words zarza meaning "bramble" (from preroman sarza), and parrilla, meaning "little grape vine".

== History in the US ==
Sarsaparilla was popular in the United States in the 19th century. According to advertisements for patent medicines of the period, it was considered to be a remedy for skin and blood problems. The Oxford Companion to American Food and Drink notes that it evokes images of "languid belles and parched cowboys".

Sarsaparilla is sometimes considered to be a type of root beer. Dozens of brands of sarsaparilla are made by microbreweries, mainly in the United States.

== Availability ==
Sarsaparilla is not readily available in most countries; however, many bars and most major supermarket chains in the Philippines, Taiwan, Singapore and Australia stock sarsaparilla-flavored soft drinks, and sarsaparilla remains available in the United Kingdom as a legacy of the temperance movement.

=== United States ===
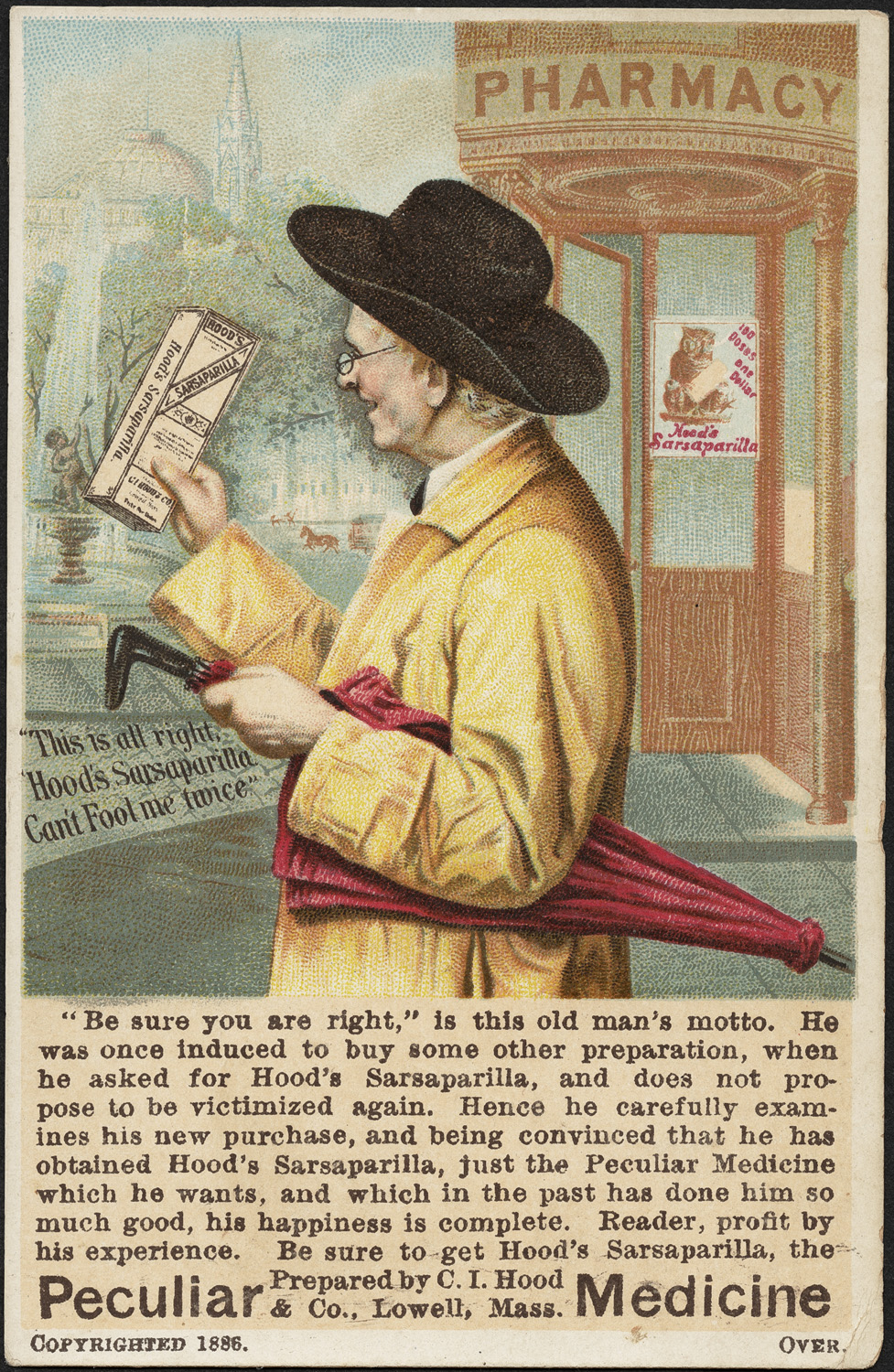
Trade card, 1886

The classic sarsaparilla was not made from the extract of the sarsaparilla plant, a tropical vine distantly related to the lily. It was originally made from a blend of birch oil and sassafras, the dried root bark of the sassafras tree. In this context, sassafras should not be confused with common sassafras seasoning, filé, used in Cajun cooking and made from dried and ground sassafras leaves. Sassafras was widely used as a home remedy in the 19th century; taken in sufficient doses it induces sweating, which some people thought had health benefits. Sarsaparilla made its debut as a patent medicine, an easy-to-take form of sassafras, much as Coca-Cola was first marketed in 1885 as a remedy for hangovers, headaches and morphine addiction. Besides the effects of the ingredients, sodas were popular in the United States at the time, due to the belief that carbonated water had health benefits. In 1960 the FDA banned the use of sassafras oil in foodstuffs after evidence accumulated showing that the main constituent, safrole, was carcinogenic. Safrole is also found in filé, nutmeg, mace, cinnamon, anise, black pepper and sweet basil, but in low enough concentration to be deemed safe.

=== East Asia ===
==== Taiwan ====
HeySong Sarsaparilla (Chinese: 黑松沙士) is the most popular brand of sarsaparilla drink in Taiwan. It is manufactured by HeySong Corporation.

=== Southeast Asia ===
==== Cambodia ====
In Cambodia, sarsaparilla is one of the flavors sold under the Fanta brand, bottled and distributed by Cambodia Beverage Company Ltd., a unit of the Coca-Cola SABCO Group.

==== Indonesia ====
There are two well known sarsaparilla brands in Indonesia, Badak (from North Sumatra) and Indo Saparella (from the Special Region of Yogyakarta). Badak was established by a Swiss national named Heinrich Surbeck in 1916 in Pematangsiantar, North Sumatra and Indo Saparella was established in 1960 in Yogyakarta. There is also Agung Ngoro a local soft drink brand who produces traditional sarsaparilla in a glass bottle.

==== Thailand ====
Hi-Mark by Green Spot was the domestic sarsaparilla drink in Thailand, but was discontinued in 2000. F&N Sarsi has been produced in Thailand by Sermsuk Public Company Limited since 2018, reviving a brand last sold locally in the 1990s.

== Sarsi (brand) ==
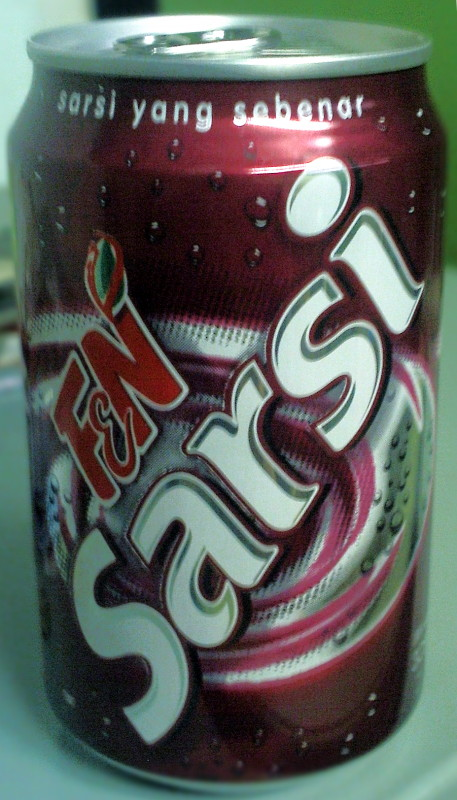
A can of F&N Sarsi from Singapore

=== Philippines ===
In the Philippines, Sarsi is a brand name for a sarsaparilla drink originally manufactured by Cosmos Bottling Corporation, a local company that is now a subsidiary of Coca-Cola Beverages Philippines, Inc. Cosmos Bottling Corporation was established in 1918 as Manila Aerated Water Company. Sarsi was originally branded as Cosmos Sarsaparilla until the 1970s. The unique taste that distinguishes the current version of Sarsi from other sarsaparilla-based soft drinks is attributed to the sugar substitute saccharin, although its "regular" formula contains high-fructose corn syrup or cane sugar.

=== Singapore ===
In Singapore, F&N Sarsi (originally branded as Sarsi) is a brand name for a sarsaparilla drink manufactured by the Singaporean company F&N Group (Fraser and Neave). It is unrelated to the brand established in the Philippines.

== Sarsae (brand) ==
=== Mainland China ===
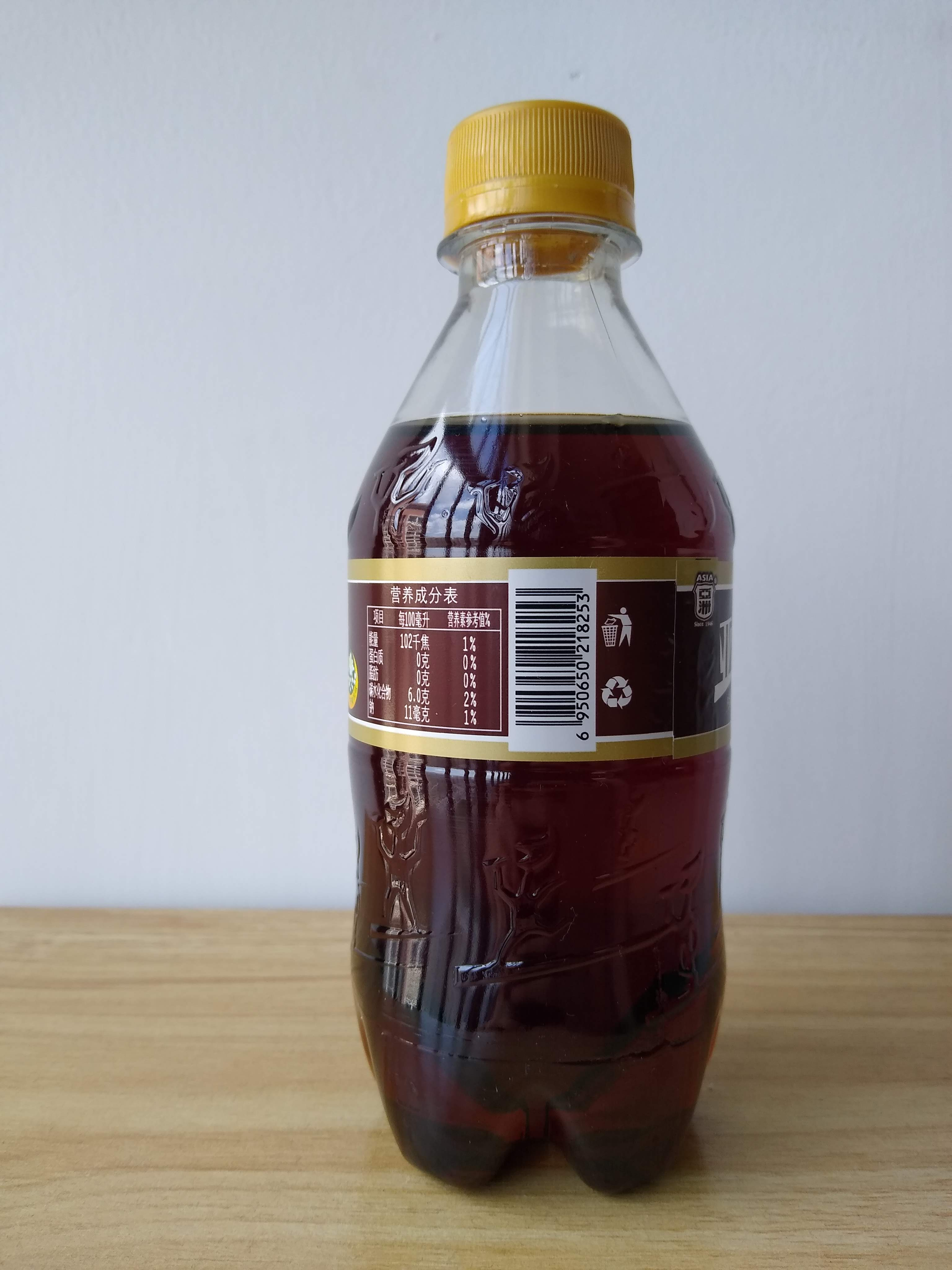
A bottle of Asia Sarsae sold in Guangzhou, Guangdong, China

In mainland China, the drink's introduction can be traced back to the 1920s, when AS Watson began producing its sarsaparilla drink in Shanghai and other Chinese cities. In the 1940s, Li Zhiyang (李智扬), Li Guanling (李冠玲), Huang Youtong (黄油桶), Liang Hanqi (梁汉奇) and Wang Zhensan (王震山) were among eleven people who had worked in Watson's Canton and founded Asian Waters in Guangzhou to continue producing Sarsae there and in other mainland Chinese locations.

Asia Sarsae (亚洲沙示) is now produced by Xiangxue Pharmaceutical.

=== Hong Kong ===
In Hong Kong, Sarsae (沙示) is the most popular brand of sarsaparilla drink. It is manufactured and distributed by the A. S. Watson Group, which pioneered in carbonated beverages in Hong Kong. The drink was the central plot device of a 1985 film called It's a Drink, It's a Bomb (starring George Lam, John Sham and Maggie Cheung), about a hand grenade disguised as a Sarsae cola, detonated by releasing its ringpull.

== See also ==
- Birch beer
- List of soft drink flavors
