= Cottee =

Cottee is a surname. Notable people with the surname include:

- Harold Warnock Cottee (1898–1973), Australian businessman and philanthropist
- Kay Cottee (born 1954), Australian sailor
- Simon Cottee, academic
- Tony Cottee (born 1965), English footballer, manager and commentator

== See also ==
- Cottee's, an Australian drinks brand
