= Club soda =

Carbonated water

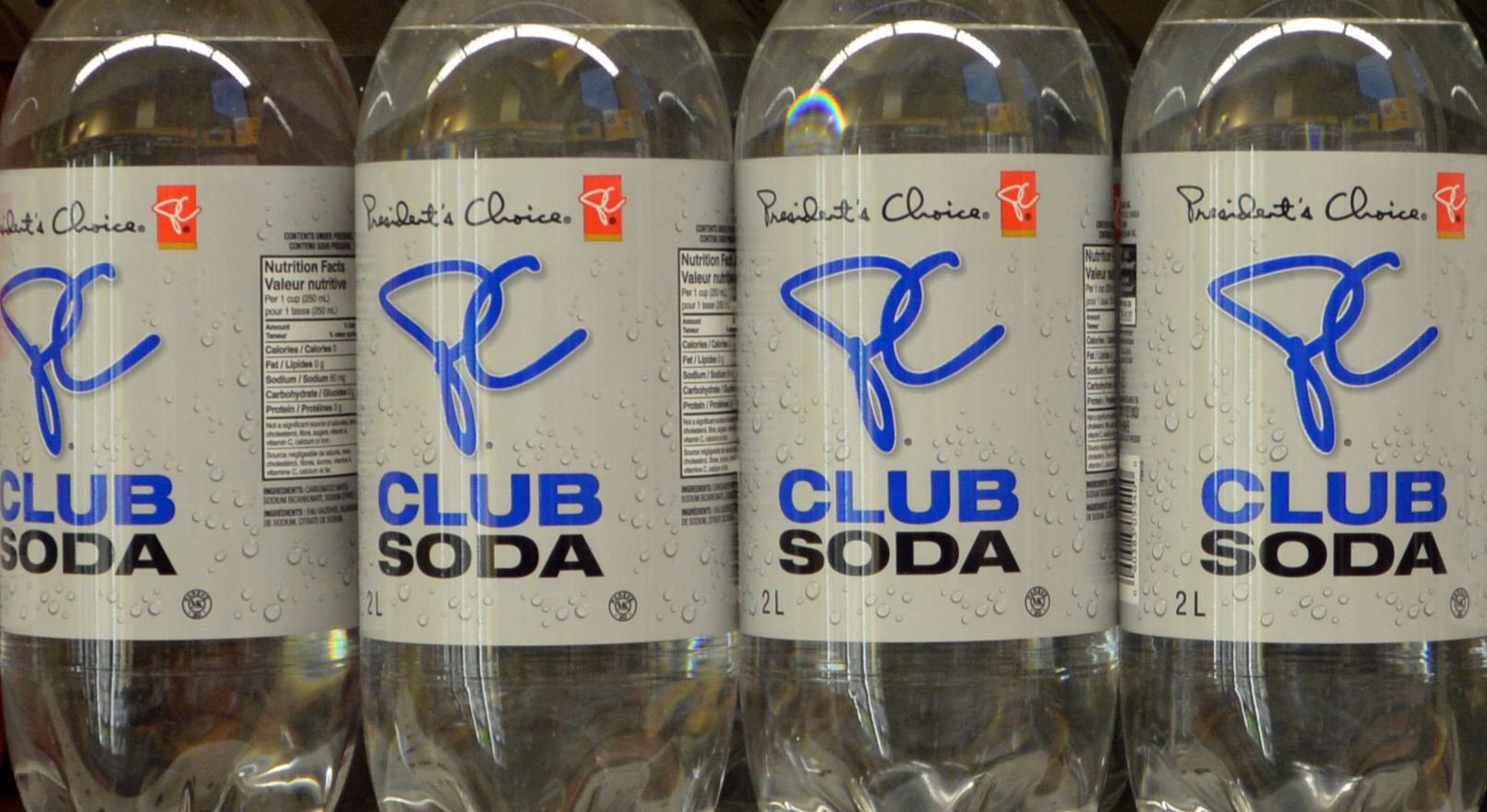
A private-label-brand club soda as seen in Canada

Club soda is a form of carbonated water manufactured in North America, commonly used as a drink mixer. Sodium bicarbonate, potassium sulfate, potassium bicarbonate, potassium citrate, or sodium citrate is added to artificially replicate constituents commonly found in natural mineral waters and offset the acidity of introducing carbon dioxide gas (which creates low 3–4 pH carbonic acid when dissolved in water).

Naturally effervescent Selters water from Germany gave rise to the generic use of the term for carbonated water, particularly from a soda siphon, in the United States and Canada as seltzer. Seltzer water is artificially carbonated but lacks added minerals.

== History ==
English chemist Joseph Priestley discovered an artificial method for producing carbonated water, described in a pamphlet called Directions for Impregnating Water with Fixed Air, published in 1772. The pamphlet explained the process of dripping sulfuric acid onto chalk, which produced carbon dioxide (CO_{2}) that was captured in a bowl of agitated water. Priestley thought such carbonated water was a cure for scurvy and proposed the process to Captain James Cook to prevent scurvy during his second voyage to the South Seas. Priestley never realized the commercial potential of his product, though he did refer to it as his "happiest discovery".

In 1783, Johann Jacob Schweppe, a jeweler and amateur scientist of Geneva, began the commercial production of carbonated mineral water by dissolving the CO_{2} under pressure. In 1807, Benjamin Silliman, a Yale chemistry professor, began producing carbonated water under pressure and selling it in New Haven, Connecticut. In the 1830s, Anyos Jedlik of Hungary opened a large-scale carbonated water factory.

The original trademarked club soda was made by Cantrell & Cochrane of Dublin in 1877. The 'club' refers to the Kildare Street Club in Dublin, which commissioned them to produce it.

== As stain remover ==
The dissolved gas in carbonated water acts as a temporary surfactant, causing it to be recommended as a household remedy for removing stains, particularly those of red wine.

== See also ==
- Tonic water
