= Harold Warnock Cottee =

Australian businessman

Harold Warnock Cottee OBE
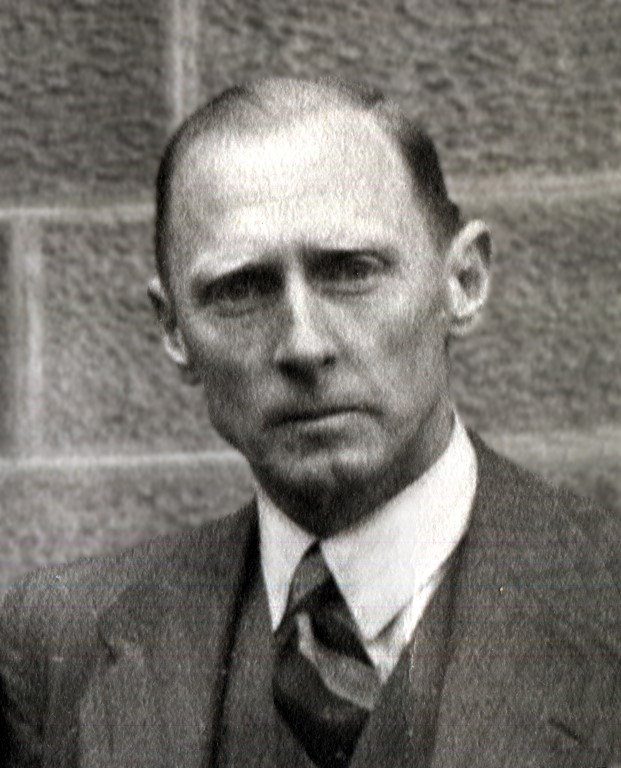
- Cottee in the 1940s
- Born: 22 August 1898; Lismore, New South Wales, Australia
- Died: 7 December 1973 (aged 75); Strathfield, New South Wales
- Board member of: Company director Cottee's Ltd.; Chairman of Cottee's General Foods Ltd
- Spouse: Lois Cottee (née Spencer)
- Children: 7

Harold Warnock Cottee OBE was an Australian businessman and philanthropist who was instrumental in making the food and drink company Cottee's Ltd one of the most successful companies in Australia at the time. The company was sold in 1966 for the highest price ever paid at that time for an Australian company.

== Early life ==
Cottee was born in Lismore, New South Wales in 1898. He was one of 11 children born to Spencer Milton Cottee and Eliza Ellen Cottee (née Dorrough), who were staunch Methodists.

== Business career ==
Cottee's father, Spencer Milton Cottee, developed the drink Passiona on which the business was based. In 1924, Harold Cottee gave up the study of law to marry an English nurse, Lois Spencer, who persuaded him to move to Sydney and try to make a success of the company registered by him and his father in 1927. With three children, the couple sought to make a success of the company and, when funds became low, they returned to Lismore to finance their return to Sydney. In February 1928, with no further capital from shareholders, sales people were sacked and the company minutes noted that "the wisest course for the directors and secretaries is to resign and for the company to stand in abeyance".

While his father moved on to other ventures, Cottee persevered and the drink became the basis of a successful business. The logo "Cottee's" on the labels of the products was reminiscent of his personal signature.

Following the advent of World War II, Cottee's Passiona Pty Ltd was selected to produce food for the armed forces, and the expansion of the company continued until in the 1950s, by which time Cottee's was known for its jams, jellies, spreads and syrups as well as soft drinks.

By 1958, the company had trebled its resources as well as maintaining a 15% dividend rate (Australian Financial Review 10 July 1958) and under the direction of Cottee, the business developed into one of Australia's major food and soft drink companies, with interests in all states.(The Australian Financial Review 5 April 1968)

Cottee was proud of his all-Australian company and resisted overtures from interested overseas buyers, but when the U.S. company General Foods made an offer, he felt the shareholders should make the decision. In 1966, Cottee's was bought by General Foods for the sum of $6 million, the highest price paid for an Australian company up to that time. Cottee was installed as chairman of Cottee's General Foods Ltd and retired two years later.

=== Philanthropy ===
Throughout his life Cottee gave generously to the Methodist Church and other organisations he felt were worthy. He particularly wanted to help disadvantaged children and young people. In 1961, he introduced passion fruit growing to Fiji and, after the sale of Cottee's Ltd., he bought the business himself to ensure the people of Sigatoka could continue to produce a cash crop and develop their community. The Fijians rewarded him by presenting him with a tabua (sperm whale's tooth), the highest honour bestowed in Fiji.

Also in 1961, Cottee started to establish an orchard in Renmark, South Australia on 500 acres of virgin land, awhich became the largest citrus farm in the southern hemisphere, developed specifically as a donation to Wesley Mission. An example of his optimism and foresight, Cottee knew that this venture would not generate a profit for seven years but did not live to see that happen: by 2007, needy children in Sydney had benefited by more than $2 million from the sale of oranges and orange juice.

Cottee supported the Wesley Mission for years and helped finance Alan Walker's "Mission to the Nation", In 1980, Dalmars Children's Homes opened a teenage refuge in Ashfield, Sydney, called "The Harold W. And Lois Cottee Lodge" in recognition of Cottee and his wife.

=== Honours ===
On 12 June 1971, Cottee received an Order of the British Empire (OBE) for services to industry and the community, and was scheduled to be knighted when he died in 1973.

=== Death ===
Cottee was survived by his wife Lois and seven children: Jean Lois, Harold Spencer, Kenneth James, Rosemary, Pauline, Carole and Dianne.
