= Ekumfi Fruits & Juices Limited =

Ekumfi Fruit & Juices Limited
- Industry: Fruit Juice
- Headquarters: Ekumfi Abor, Ghana
- Area served: Ghana
- Products: Ekumfi Pure Juices
- Website: www.ekumfijuice.com

Ekumfi Fruits and Juices Limited is a Ghanaian fruit juice company which specializes in the manufacturing of locally made fruit juices (such as mango, passion fruit, citrus, pineapple and ginger) from the Ekumfi Abor district in the Central Region of Ghana. The organisation was born as part of the government's flagship programme One district, one factory (1D1F) initiative in 2019.

The factory has created about 5,000 direct jobs in an attempt to alleviate poverty within the community and its neighboring districts and regions.

== Developments ==
The company under the Ghana Export and Import (EXIM) funding institution, receives diverse business proposals from different entities and individuals worldwide.

The facility is known to be the biggest processing factory for fruits in West Africa. Producing approximately 10 tons of fruits per hour.

== Products ==
Ekumfi Juice products sold under the Ekumfi Pure Juice brand name include:

- Ekumfi 100% Juice Cartons (2 flavors)
- Ekumfi 100% Juice Glass Bottles (2 flavors)

=== Ingredients ===
- Pineapple only
- Pineapple and Ginger

=== Packaging ===
The Ekumfi fruit juice products are predominantly coloured yellow and green.

== Funding ==
The factory received GH¢74.7million from the Ghana Export and Import (EXIM) /Exim Bank Ghana Limited to support agricultural industrial intervention with an aim of increasing entrepreneurship for Ghanaians.
