= Ladd's cordials =

Soft drink company in Adelaide, South Australia

Ladd's was a family-owned soft-drink manufacturer of Adelaide, South Australia, which operated from around 1860 to around 1950.

== History ==
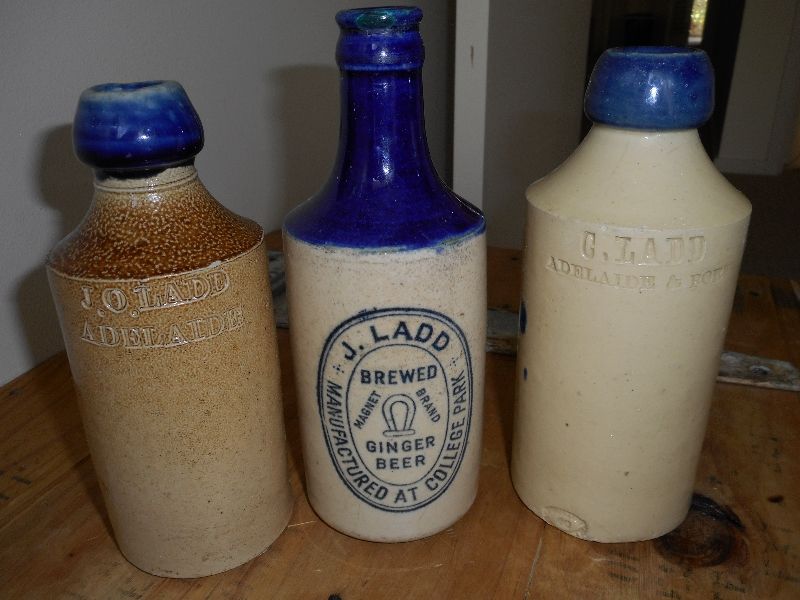
"Stonie" ginger beer bottles from three generations of Ladd family

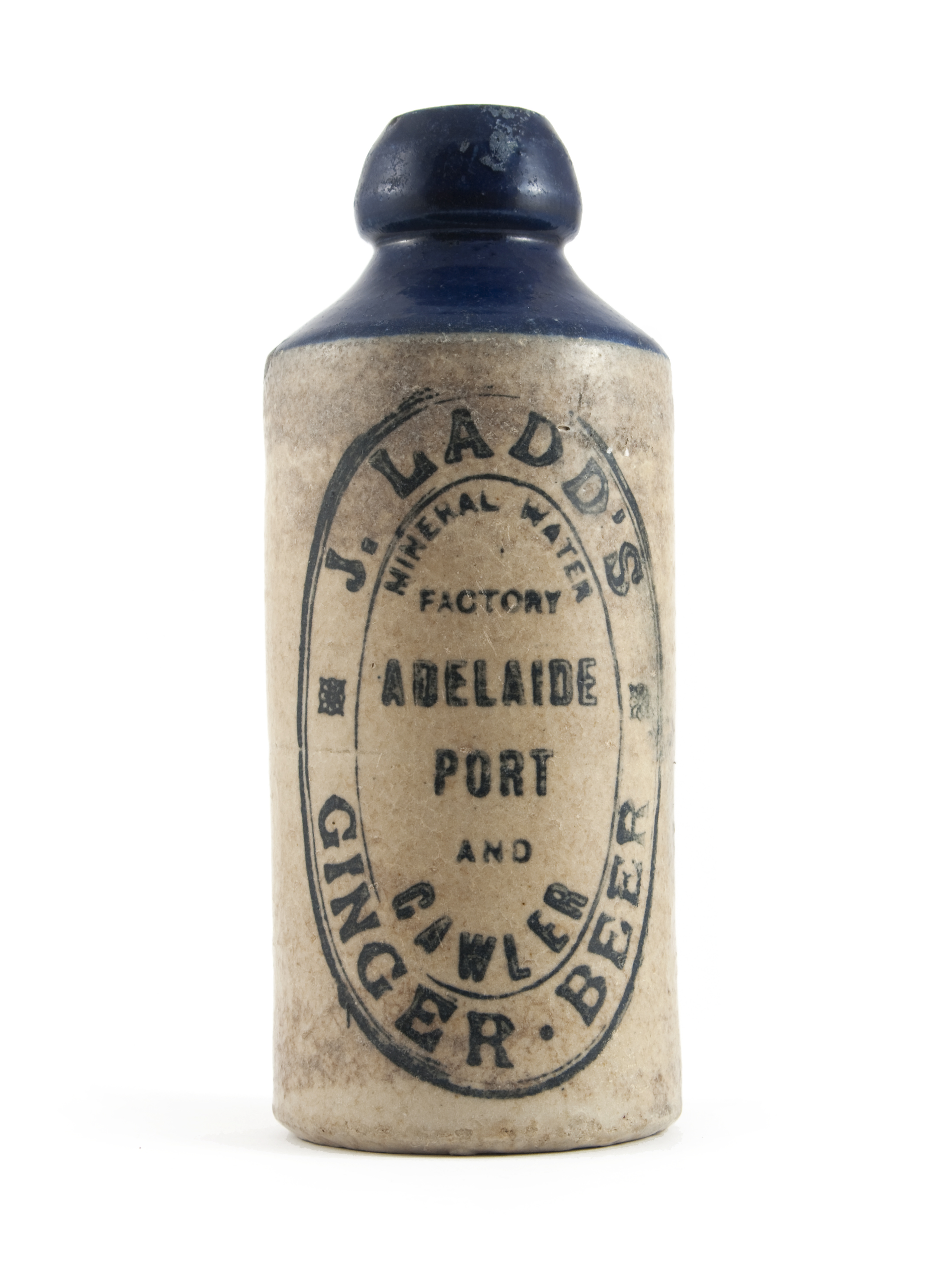
One of many patterns of pottery "stonie" bottles used by Ladds for ginger beer until around 1930

Joseph Onesimus Ladd (c. January 1818 – 12 June 1882) was born in Nacton, Sussex and emigrated to Australia, arriving in Adelaide around 1847 via Melbourne, Victoria. In 1849 he was granted a publican's licence for the Gepp's Cross Hotel. He married Caroline Fuller (c. 1828 – 2 August 1897) in Adelaide on 6 April 1853. They had thirteen children.

He set up a ginger beer manufacturing business in Flinders Street, Adelaide, around 1860. In 1868 he moved to a half-acre block on Rundle Street, between Wilcox's drapery and Allott's pharmacy. Shortly after, he began to manufacture cordials and aerated waters the following year. He had some connection with Mauritius, the nature of which is not clear. It is conceivable, but by no means certain, that he used his contacts on that island for his supplies of sugar and/or ginger.

J. O. Ladd died at Lockleys in 1882 and his wife Caroline Ladd (c. 1828–1897) took over the business, moving the factory to Harrow Road, College Park in 1884, equipped with all the latest machinery. The family lived at the same address. This choice of location was no doubt due to the purity of spring water available in the area: Woodroofe's and Hall's soft drink factories and Coopers Brewery all took advantage of the same water.

As with their competitors, Ladds used many kinds of bottles over the years, including various "stonie" pottery bottles, and in glass the Codd pattern (with the internal glass ball seal), Barrett or Riley pattern (with a Vulcanite "screw-top" threaded stopper) in the 26 imperial fluid ounces (740 ml) bottle and, from around 1930, crown seal types. Bottles remained the property of the drink manufacturer, and if undamaged could be steam-cleaned and re-used over and over again. Mrs. Ladd purchased second-hand bottles from dealers ("marine store collectors") and instructed her bottle-washers and fillers to use all bottles, no matter what the brand. This was against the rules of the Aerated Waters and Cordial Makers' Employés' Union, (It was some 20 years before the manufacturers had a similar agreement) and the men refused to do so, and threatened strike action if forced to disobey Union Rules. Mrs. Ladd's motives were financial: she purchased secondhand bottles for 8d. per dozen, whereas new bottles cost 36s. per gross (3s. per dozen). In today's money that would be around $5.00 v. $22.00 per dozen.

Caroline died in 1897 and her son Joseph Ladd (1856–1929) took over management of the factory. Joseph had married Mary Cunningham (1861–1931) in 1888. Their son Roy Leslie Joseph Ladd (1892–1954) married Jessie Ann Sutherland (1890–1976) in 1917; they lived at 143 Wattle street, Malvern.

Joseph died in 1929 and his son Roy took over the business, and around this time adopted the (horseshoe) Magnet trade mark. In early 1948 the family business was restructured as a limited liability company, and in June 1950 a new entity called J. L. Aerated Waters Ltd. was founded to take over the assets of J. Ladd Ltd. A month later the new company was renamed "Ladds Limited". Roy Ladd died in July 1954 and three months later the company was liquidated. Assets were disposed of included the property at Harrow Road, St. Peters, and the right to the trade name "Spa-Kup".

== See also ==
- Cottee's
- List of soft drinks by country
