= Cottee's =

Food and beverage brand

Cottees
- Type: Cordials, conserves
- Founded: 1927
- Founder: Spencer Cottee
- Headquarters: Melbourne, Victoria, Australia
- Parent: Kraft Heinz and Asahi Breweries

Cottee's is an Australian food and beverage brand founded in 1911 as a dairy company, which continues to operate as the Cottee Group. The beverage business began with Passiona syrup in 1924, and was spun off as Cottees Passiona in 1927. The company diversified into a variety of products including cordial, jams, marmalades and other spreads, toppings, jellies and puddings. In 2007 then owner Cadbury sold its Australian non-confectionery and non-beverage business to Heinz, including Cottees spreads, toppings and desserts; and in 2008 Asahi Breweries acquired the beverage businesses, including Cottees cordials and Passiona. Cadbury retained the trademark for colorings, peanut products and frozen and dried fruit, which passed to Mondelez International in 2012.

== History ==
The company was founded in the early 20th century by dairy farmer Spencer Milton Cottee (September 1863 – 8 June 1944) from Lismore. Cottee was a champion of the dairy industry and began processing and marketing the milk by-product casein. He diversified into processing passionfruit into Passiona soft drink. A factory was opened in Leichhardt in the 1930s. Passiona was also bottled in South Australia by Geo. Hall and Sons.

Apart from Passiona, the most popular Cottee's carbonated soft drinks were Tango (orange), and Coola (lime), with other flavours including lemon, cola, and lemonade. The brand's popularity reached its zenith in the 1960s. Cottee's Coola flavour is the most popular cordial in Australia (Coola, Australia's Flavourite Cordial).

In 1965, Cottee's was acquired by the American company General Foods and in 1984 Cottees businesses were sold to Cadbury Schweppes. In June 2007 Cadbury sold its non-confectionery Australian grocery businesses, including Cottees spreads and desserts, to H.J. Heinz. The Japanese Asahi Group then bought Schweppes Australia in 2008 from Cadbury, including the Cottees cordial and Passiona beverage trademarks in Australia.

== See also ==
- Harold Warnock Cottee
- Ladd's cordials
