= William Barribal =

English artist

- Born: William Henry Barribal; 1874
- Died: 1952 (aged 77–78)
- Occupations: Painter, artist, former lithographer
- Known for: World War 1 Recruitment posters, Schweppes posters

William Henry Barribal (1874–1952) was an English artist from London who began his career as a lithographer before going on to study at the Académie Julian in Paris.

== Biography ==
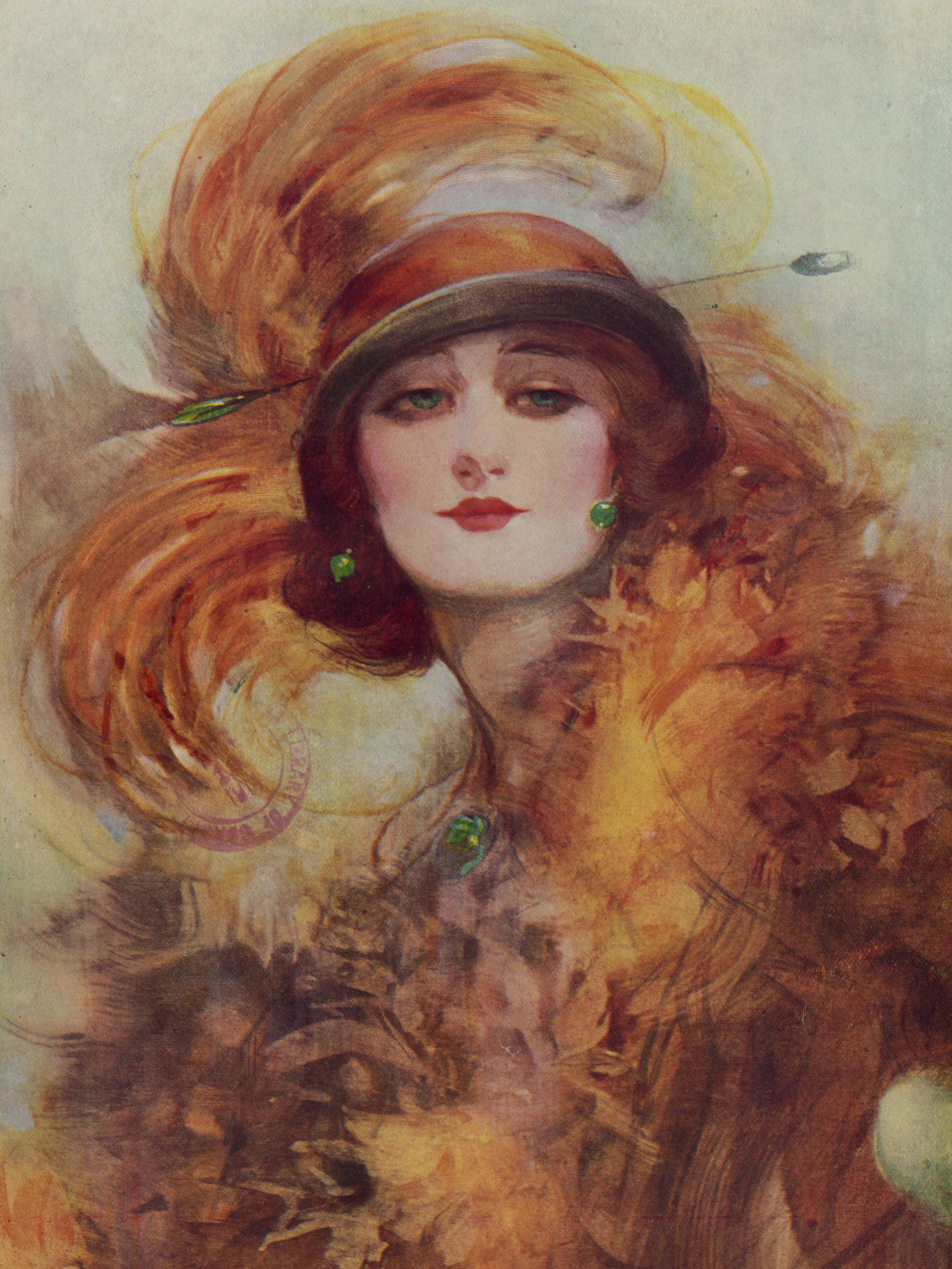
The Lure of the Green Eyes print (cropped) from painting by W.H. Barribal

By the turn of the 20th century, Barribal had become an accomplished painter and designer. He created a series of images that were used on First World War recruitment posters in Great Britain. During the 1920s and 1930s he created a range of posters for the Schweppes advertising campaign and in 1921, he was contracted to work for Waddingtons, producing work that was used for posters and later a series of playing cards, these works being keenly sought after today. His bold Art Deco posters designed in the 1920s and 1930s for the London and North Eastern Railway are also well known. His wife, Gertrude Louisa Fannie Pitt, was his principal model and his work also included cigarette cards on which she appeared.

Barribal also worked for various magazines, including the leading fashion journal Vogue, and between 1919 and 1938, he regularly exhibited his work. His images of exquisite and fashionable Edwardian women have become classics and the work of many modern fashion artists shows traces of the unmistakable "Barribal style".
