= Asahi Beverages =

Australian soft drink brand

- Trade name: Asahi Beverages
- Type: Private Subsidiary
- Industry: Beverage
- Founded: 1877; 149 years ago
- Headquarters: Melbourne, Victoria, Australia
- Area served: Australia and New Zealand
- Products: Pepsi, Sunkist, Mountain Dew, Gatorade, Cottee’s Cordial, Spring Valley Beverages, Pop Tops, Cool Ridge, Frantelle, P&N Beverages, Solo
- Owner: Asahi Group Holdings
- Number of employees: 1800+
- Divisions: Australia
- Website: asahibeverages.com

Asahi Beverages is the non-alcohol business of Asahi Breweries operating in Australia and New Zealand. Its history is tied to Schweppes whose beverages arrived in Australia in 1850. In 1877, the first factory was built in Sydney, followed by one in Melbourne in 1885. After an international merger with Cadbury in 1969, forming Cadbury Schweppes, the company was eventually re-separated on 27 February 2009 and, in April 2009, Schweppes Australia was acquired by Asahi Breweries.

Asahi Beverages is a licensed manufacturer and distributor of brands such as Pepsi, Sunkist, Mountain Dew, and Gatorade. They also produce Schweppes range of soft drinks, as well as many other Australian brands, including Solo, Passiona, Cottee's Cordial, Spring Valley Beverages, Pop Tops and Cool Ridge, and Frantelle spring water. In 2011, Asahi acquired the juice and water brands of P&N Beverages, Australia's third largest volume supplier of fruit juices, soft drinks and mineral waters.

The Asahi Beverages head office is located in Melbourne. There are eight manufacturing sites across five states and sales offices in each state.

== Products ==

Classic Mixers: Dry Ginger Ale, Diet Dry Ginger Ale, Indian Tonic Water, Lemon Lime & Bitters, Soda Water, Diet Tonic Water, Bitter Lemon

Agrum Collection: Blood Orange (originally called Ciata), Citrus Blend (originally simply called Agrum), Sugar Free Citrus Blend, White Grape & Passionfruit (discontinued circa 2014), Calamansi Lime (Viage; discontinued circa 2006)

Mineral Waters: Lemon, Orange & Lime, Orange & Mango, Sparking Mineral Water, Apple & Pink Grapefruit, Lemon & Lime, Orange & Passionfruit, Natural Mineral Water

Traditional Soft Drinks: Red Cream Soda, Brown Cream Soda, Raspberry, Sarsaparilla, Lemonade, Pink Lemonade, Lime, Ginger Beer, Fruit Tingler, and Fairy Floss

Cordials: Raspberry Cordial, Lemon Cordial, Lime Cordial ^{[2]}

== See also ==
- List of oldest companies in Australia
- List of bottling companies
