= Geo. Hall & Sons =

Soft drink manufacturer in South Australia

"Stonie" (non-alcoholic) ginger beer gained its name from the ceramic bottles they were sold in.

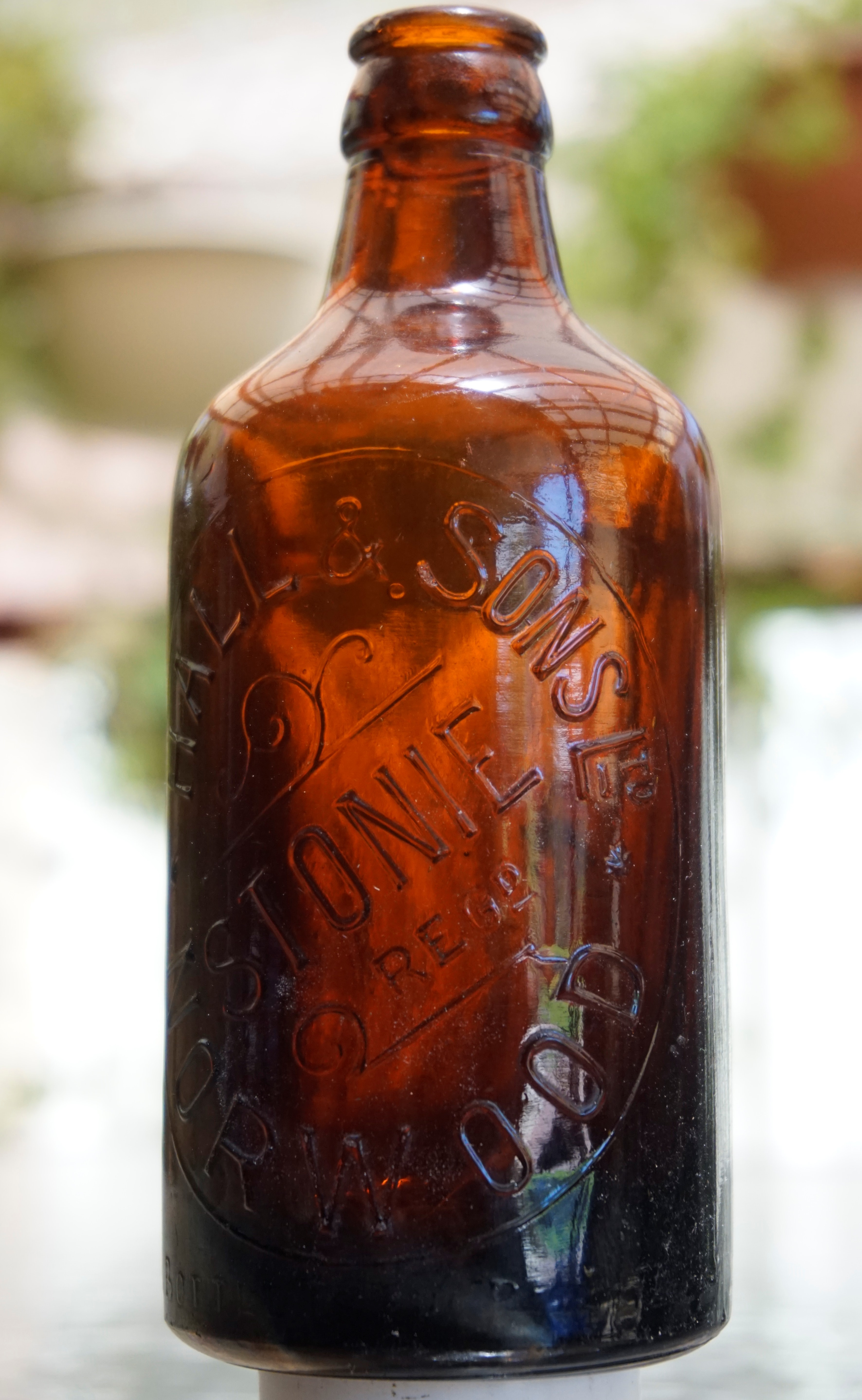
Later bottle (c. 1940)

Geo. Hall & Sons, more recently known as Halls, was a soft drink manufacturer founded in 1849 in Marryatville, South Australia (a suburb of Adelaide) by English immigrant George Hall (1818-1881). The plant later moved to Norwood, using water from natural springs. Its most well-known product was ginger beer, popularly known as "Stonie's". After George's death, the company continued to be owned by his descendants, until it was taken over in 1972. The Halls brand name was discontinued in 2000, before being relaunched in 2023 under new ownership.

== History ==
=== Beginnings ===
Hall was born in Waldron, Sussex, England, on 19 March 1818. During his teenage years, He had pursued the brewing of non-alcoholic drinks as a hobby. After working as a laundryman for about 14 years in both England and France, Hall and his family decided to emigrate to the new colony of South Australia, arrived in Port Adelaide in 1849, and settled in the new village of Marryatville.

Hall started producing soda water, specialising in "Stonie" ginger beer, then sold in ceramic bottles, by 1851.

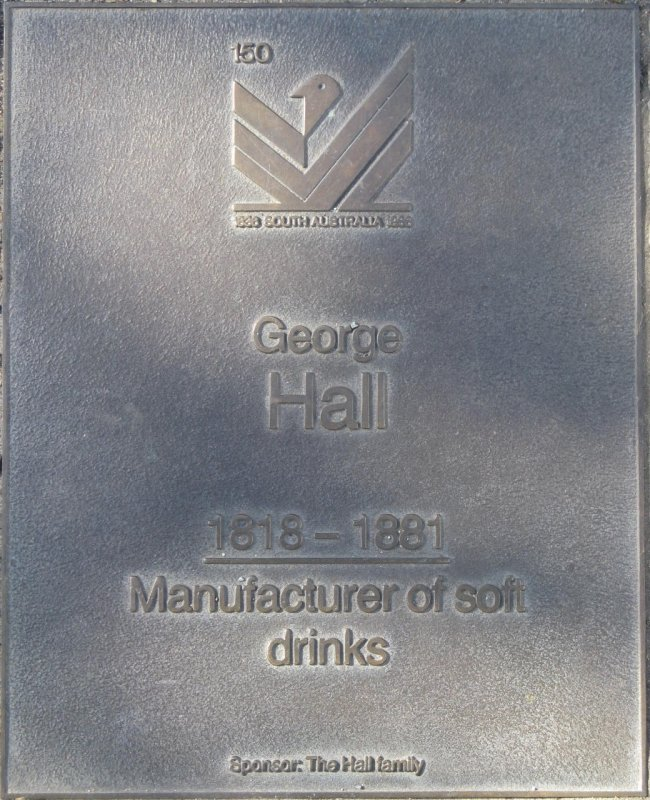
Commemorative plaque on the Jubilee 150 Walkway

Amongst the oldest aerated water manufacturers in South Australia, in 1869 George was joined by sons Henry, Thomas and Edward in the firm, which then became known as Geo. Hall & Sons. In 1872 they moved from the Marryatville site to larger premises, a former soap and candle factory on the corner of Edward Street and the Norwood Parade, where their major competitor was W Woodroofe & Son.

By 1970, Hall & Sons produced 30,000 bottles an hour.

At the 1880 International Exhibition in London, Geo. Hall & Sons were awarded six first prizes for their aerated water and soft drinks, as reported in The South Australian Register of 30 April 1880:

Messrs. Hall & Sons (of Norwood) Aerated Waters are pronounced to be a most extraordinary success, and have completely defeated all the European, American and Australian exhibits in all the six kinds exhibited. Every Water shown by Hall & Sons obtained a first class prize. The judges expressed great astonishment, and attributed the results to the supremacy of the Adelaide water.

After George Hall's death on 24 April 1881, sons Henry and Edward took over the company, which remained family-operated for a further third and fourth generation.

=== 20th century ===
During the 20th century, the company produced a range of soft drinks and cordials, including Passiona, a Cottee's product they bottled for local consumption.

In 1972, Geo. Hall and Sons was purchased by C-C Bottlers, a licensed manufacturer of Coca-Cola for South Australia, who continued producing soft drinks under the Hall's brand. C-C Bottlers was in turn purchased by Coca-Cola Amatil in 1990, who in October 2000 discontinued the Halls name, unifying several brands under the same name, Kirks, with other acquired local bottlers.

== Relaunch ==
It was announced on 7 November in 2020 that Halls soft drinks were making a comeback with Cameron Ballard, owner of Coffee World in South Australia, obtaining the rights to the Halls soft drink name and relaunching the brand. It was set to be available for sale in South Australian stores by the middle of summer 2021/2022.

For the launch, Halls announced 4 original flavours would be returning; Halls Lemon Twist, Halls Fruita, Halls Lemonade and Halls Stonie Ginger Beer, with the hopes to get more original flavours back in time.

Ballard stated he had been in contact with the Hall family to work on the recipes for the flavours to try and replicate the original taste of the drinks.

Halls soft drinks relaunched production on 23 October 2023 in Willunga, South Australia.
