= Carbonated water =

Water containing dissolved carbon dioxide gas

External audio
- "Fizzy Water", Distillations Podcast Episode 217, Science History Institute

Carbonated water showing its carbonation, which may be either natural or artificially introduced

Carbonated water (Note: Also known as soda water, bubbly water, sparkling water, fizzy water, water with gas, unflavored soda, in many places as mineral water, and, especially in the United States, as seltzer or seltzer water.) is water containing dissolved carbon dioxide gas, either artificially injected under pressure, or occurring due to natural geological processes. Carbonation causes small bubbles to form, giving the water an effervescent quality. Common forms include sparkling natural mineral water, club soda, and commercially produced sparkling water.

Club soda, sparkling mineral water, or some other sparkling waters contain added or dissolved minerals such as potassium bicarbonate, sodium bicarbonate, sodium citrate, or potassium sulfate. These occur naturally in some mineral waters but are also commonly added artificially to manufactured waters to mimic a natural flavor profile and offset the acidity of introducing carbon dioxide gas, giving one a fizzy sensation. Various carbonated waters are sold in bottles and cans, with some also produced on demand by commercial carbonation systems in bars and restaurants, or made at home using a carbon dioxide cartridge.

It is thought that the first person to aerate water with carbon dioxide was William Brownrigg in the 1740s. Joseph Priestley invented carbonated water, independently and by accident, in 1767 when he discovered a method of infusing water with carbon dioxide after having suspended a bowl of water above a beer vat at a brewery in Leeds, Yorkshire. He wrote of the "peculiar satisfaction" he found in drinking it, and in 1772 he published a paper entitled Impregnating Water with Fixed Air. Priestley's apparatus, almost identical to that used by Henry Cavendish five years earlier, which featured a bladder between the generator and the absorption tank to regulate the flow of carbon dioxide, was soon joined by a wide range of others. However, it was not until 1781 that companies specialized in producing artificial mineral water were established and began producing carbonated water on a large scale. The first factory was built by Thomas Henry of Manchester, England. Henry replaced the bladder in Priestley's system with large bellows.

While Priestley's discovery ultimately led to the creation of the soft drink industry—which began in 1783 when Johann Jacob Schweppe founded Schweppes to sell bottled soda water—he did not benefit financially from his invention. Priestley received scientific recognition when the Council of the Royal Society "were moved to reward its discoverer with the Copley Medal" at the anniversary meeting of the Royal Society on 30 November 1773.

== Composition ==
Natural and manufactured carbonated waters may contain a small amount of sodium chloride, sodium citrate, sodium bicarbonate, potassium bicarbonate, potassium citrate, potassium sulfate, or disodium phosphate, depending on the product. These occur naturally in mineral waters but are added artificially to commercially produced waters to mimic a natural flavor profile and offset the acidity of introducing carbon dioxide gas (which creates low 5–6 pH carbonic acid solution when dissolved in water).

Artesian wells in such places as Mihalkovo in the Bulgarian Rhodope Mountains, Medžitlija in North Macedonia, and most notably in Selters in the German Taunus mountains, produce naturally effervescent mineral waters.

== Health effects ==
By itself, carbonated water appears to have little to no impact on health.

Carbonated water does not appear to have an effect on gastroesophageal reflux disease. There is tentative evidence that carbonated water may help with constipation among people who have had a stroke.

=== Acid erosion ===
While carbonated water is somewhat acidic, this acidity can be partially neutralized by saliva. A study found that sparkling mineral water is slightly more erosive to teeth than non-carbonated water but is about 1% as corrosive as soft drinks are.

== Chemistry and physical properties ==
Bonds in carbonic acid are more easily broken at high temperatures resulting in the generation of water and gaseous carbon dioxide. Thus sparkling water at lower temperatures (far right) holds more carbonation than at high (far left).

Carbon dioxide gas dissolved in water creates a small amount of carbonic acid (H_{2}CO_{3}):

H_{2}O(l) + CO_{2}(g) ⇌ H_{2}CO_{3}(aq)

with the concentration of carbonic acid being about 0.17% that of CO_{2}. The acid gives carbonated water a slightly tart flavor. Its pH level of between 5 and 6 is approximately in between apple juice and orange juice in acidity, but much less acidic than the acid in the stomach. A normal, healthy human body maintains pH equilibrium via acid–base homeostasis and will not be materially adversely affected by consumption of plain carbonated water. Carbon dioxide in the blood is expelled through the lungs. Alkaline salts, such as sodium bicarbonate, potassium bicarbonate, or potassium citrate, will increase pH.

The amount of a gas that can be dissolved in water is described by Henry's law. The coefficient depends on the temperature. In the carbonization process, water is chilled, optimally to just above freezing, to maximize the amount of carbon dioxide that can be dissolved in it. Higher gas pressure and lower temperature cause more gas to dissolve in the liquid. When the temperature is raised or the pressure is reduced (as happens when a container of carbonated water is opened), carbon dioxide effervesces, thereby escaping from the solution.

The density of carbonated water is slightly greater than that of pure water. The volume of a quantity of carbonated water can be calculated by taking the volume of the water and adding 0.8 cubic centimetres for each gram of CO_{2}.

== History ==
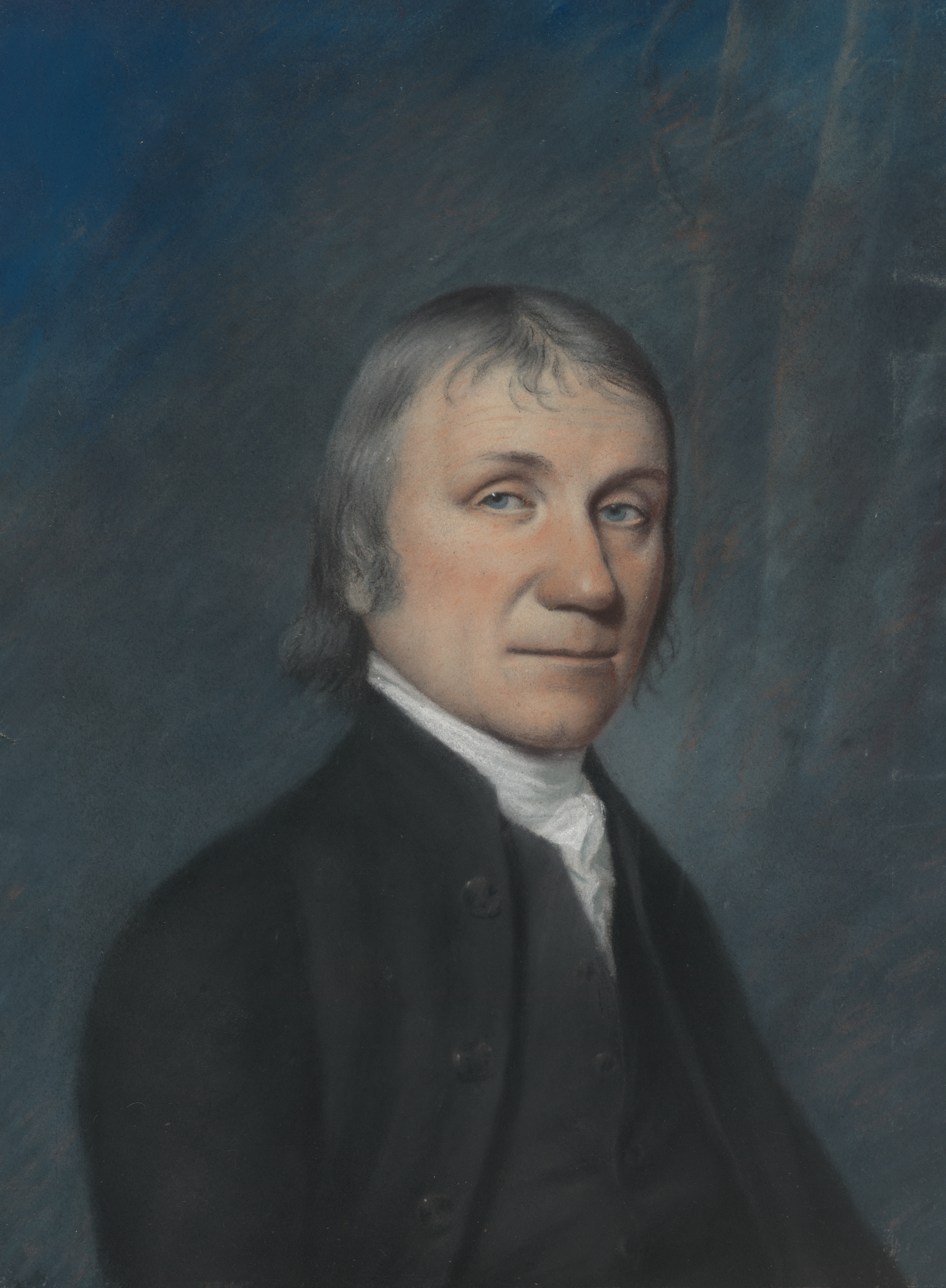
Joseph Priestley pioneered a method of carbonation in the 18th century.

Many alcoholic drinks, such as beer, champagne, cider, and spritzer, were naturally carbonated through the fermentation process. In 1662 Christopher Merret created 'sparkling wine'. William Brownrigg was apparently the first to produce artificial carbonated water, in the early 1740s, by using carbon dioxide taken from mines. In 1750 the Frenchman Gabriel François Venel also produced artificial carbonated water, though he misunderstood the nature of the gas that caused the carbonation. In 1764, Irish chemist Dr. Macbride infused water with carbon dioxide as part of a series of experiments on fermentation and putrefaction. In 1766 Henry Cavendish devised an aerating apparatus that would inspire Joseph Priestley to carry out his own experiments with regard to carbonated waters. Cavendish was also aware of Brownrigg's observations at this time and published a paper on his own experiments on a nearby source of mineral water at the beginning of January in the next year.

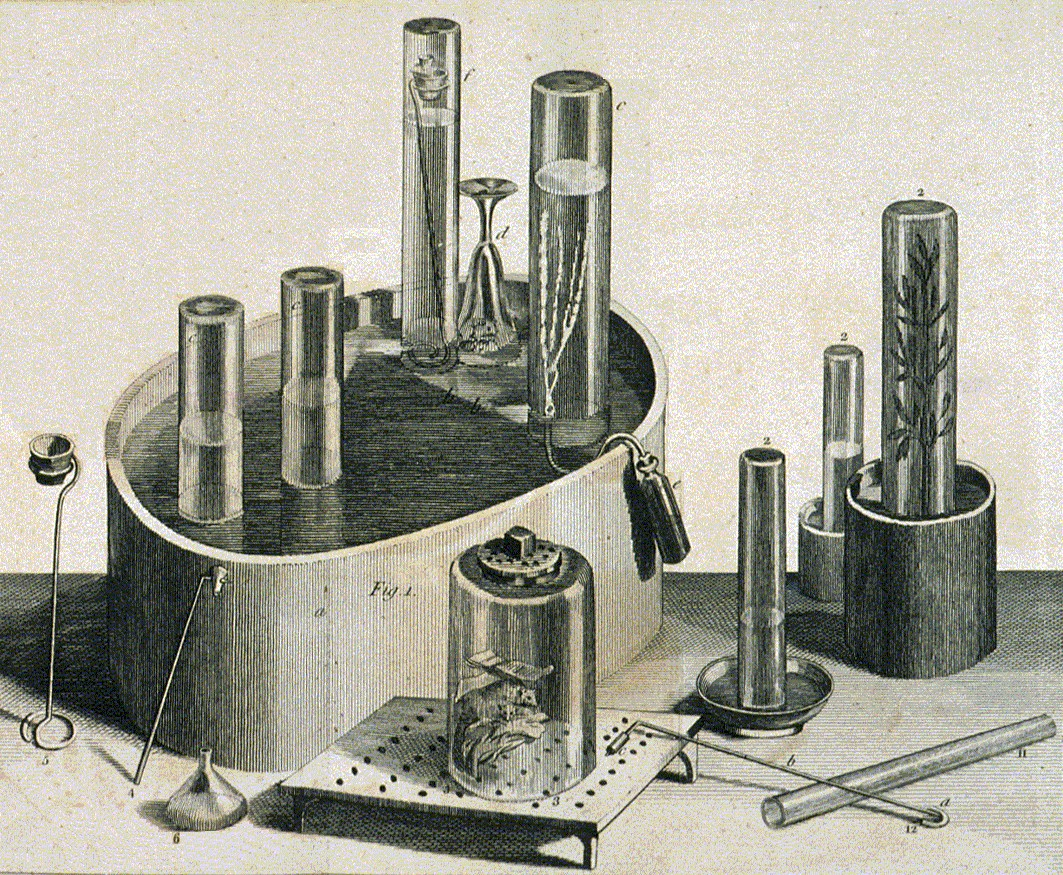
Equipment used by Priestley in his experiments on gases and the carbonation of water

In 1767 Priestley discovered a method of infusing water with carbon dioxide by pouring water back and forth above a beer vat at a local brewery in Leeds, England. The air blanketing the fermenting beer—called 'fixed air'—was known to kill mice suspended in it. Priestley found water thus treated had a pleasant taste, and he offered it to friends as a cool, refreshing drink. In 1772, Priestley published a paper titled Impregnating Water with Fixed Air in which he describes dripping "oil of vitriol" (sulfuric acid) onto chalk to produce carbon dioxide gas, and encouraging the gas to dissolve into an agitated bowl of water. Priestley referred to his invention of this treated water as being his "happiest" discovery.

"Within a decade, inventors in Britain and in Europe had taken Priestley's basic idea—get some "fixed air," mix it with water, shake—and created contraptions that could make carbonated water more quickly, in greater quantities. One of those inventors was named Johann Jacob Schweppe, who sold bottled soda water and whose business is still around today."

— The Great Soda-Water Shake Up, The Atlantic, October 2014.

Priestley's apparatus, which was very similar to that invented by Henry Cavendish five years earlier, featured a bladder between the generator and the absorption tank to regulate the flow of carbon dioxide, and was soon joined by a wide range of others, but it was not until 1781 that companies specialized in producing artificial mineral water were established and began producing carbonated water on a large scale. The first factory was built by Thomas Henry of Manchester, England. Henry replaced the bladder in Priestley's system with large bellows. J. J. Schweppe developed a process to manufacture bottled carbonated mineral water based on the discovery of Priestley, founding the Schweppes Company in Geneva in 1783. Schweppes regarded Priestley as "the father of our industry". In 1792, Schweppe moved to London to develop the business there. In 1799 Augustine Thwaites founded Thwaites' Soda Water in Dublin. A London Globe article claims that this company was the first to patent and sell "Soda Water" under that name. The article says that in the hot summer of 1777 in London "aerated waters" (that is, carbonated) were selling well but there was as yet no mention of "soda water", though the first effervescent drinks were probably made using "soda powders" containing bicarbonate of soda and tartaric acid. The name soda water arose from the fact that soda (sodium carbonate or bicarbonate) was often added to adjust the taste and pH.

Modern carbonated water is made by injecting pressurized carbon dioxide into water. The pressure increases the solubility and allows more carbon dioxide to dissolve than would be possible under standard atmospheric pressure. When the bottle is opened, the pressure is released, allowing gas to exit the solution, forming the characteristic bubbles.

Modern sources of CO_{2} are from industrial processes, such as burning of fossil fuels like coal and methane at power plants, or steam reforming of methane for hydrogen production.

In early-20th-century New York, seltzer became closely associated with Jewish immigrant households on the Lower East Side. Scholars have linked its popularity to the availability of clean drinking water, its inherently kosher status and home delivery by seltzermen, whose reusable siphon bottles often carried a Star of David, menorah or other Jewish insignia.

=== Etymology ===
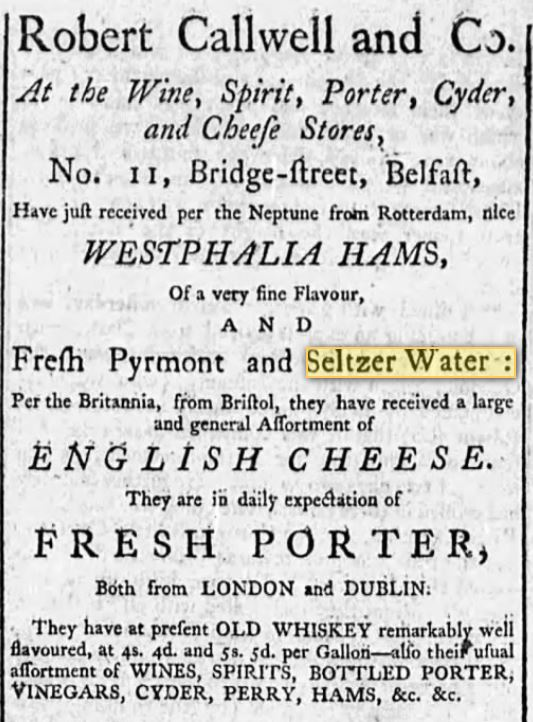
Belfast Evening Post, Belfast, Ireland, August 7, 1786

In the United States, plain carbonated water was generally known either as soda water, due to the sodium salts it contained, or seltzer water, deriving from the German town Selters renowned for its mineral springs.

Sodium salts were added to plain water both as flavoring (to mimic famed mineral waters, such as naturally effervescent Selters, Vichy water and Saratoga Water) and acidity regulators (to offset the acidic 5-6 pH carbonic acid created when carbon dioxide is dissolved in water).

== Products for carbonating water ==
=== Home ===
==== Soda siphons ====
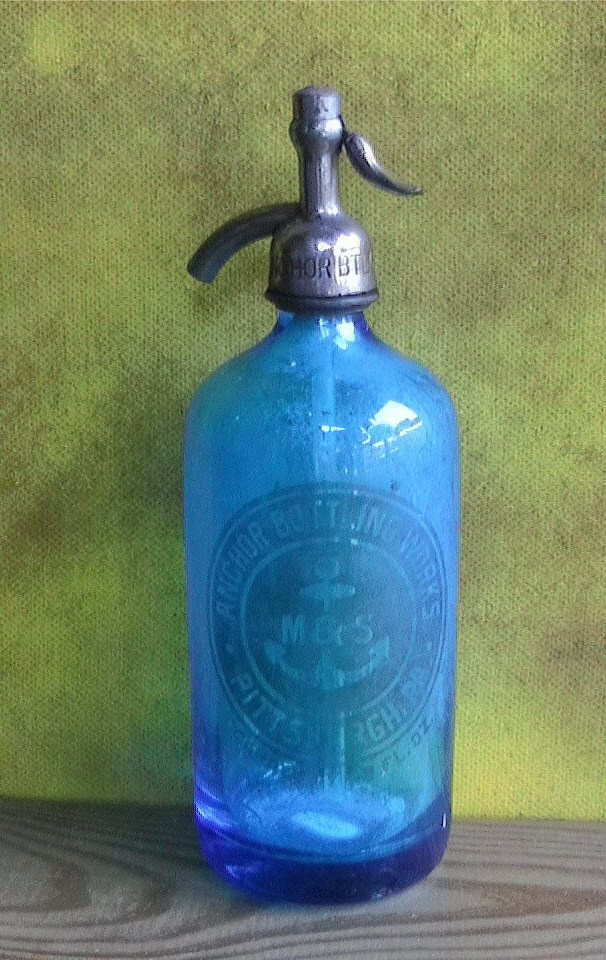
A soda siphon c. 1922

The soda siphon, or seltzer bottle—a glass or metal pressure vessel with a release valve and spout for dispensing pressurized soda water—was a common sight in bars and in early- to mid-20th-century homes where it became a symbol of middle-class affluence.

The gas pressure in a siphon drives soda water up through a tube inside the siphon when a valve lever at the top is depressed. Commercial soda siphons came pre-charged with water and gas and were returned to the retailer for exchange when empty. A deposit scheme ensured they were not otherwise thrown away.

Home soda siphons can carbonate flatwater through the use of a small disposable steel bulb containing carbon dioxide. The bulb is pressed into the valve assembly at the top of the siphon, the gas injected, then the bulb withdrawn.

==== Gasogene ====
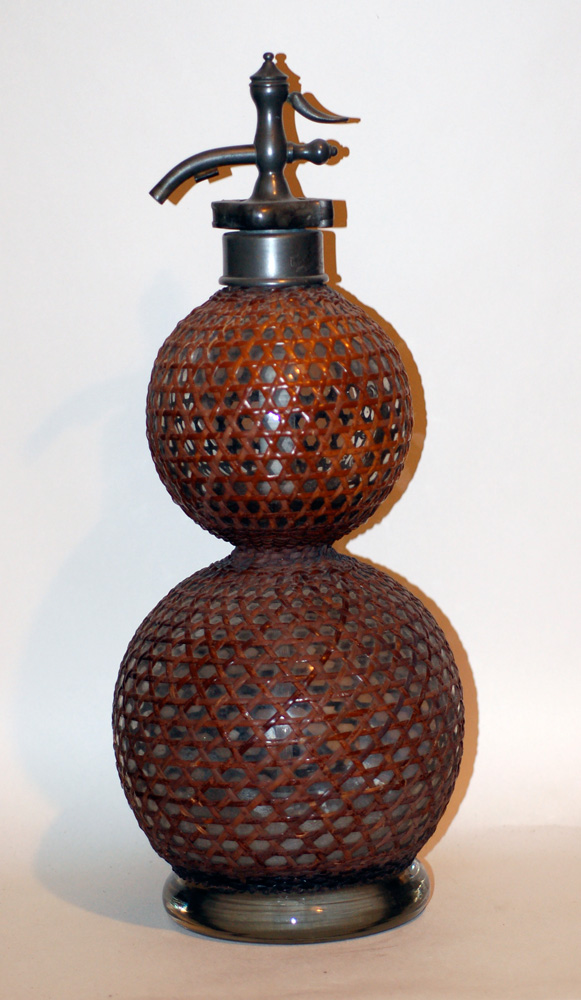
Late Victorian seltzogene made by British Syphon

The gasogene (or gazogene, or seltzogene) is a late Victorian device for producing carbonated water. It consists of two linked glass globes: the lower contained water or other drink to be made sparkling, the upper a mixture of tartaric acid and sodium bicarbonate that reacts to produce carbon dioxide. The produced gas pushes the liquid in the lower container up a tube and out of the device. The globes are surrounded by a wicker or wire protective mesh, as they have a tendency to explode.

==== Codd-neck bottles ====
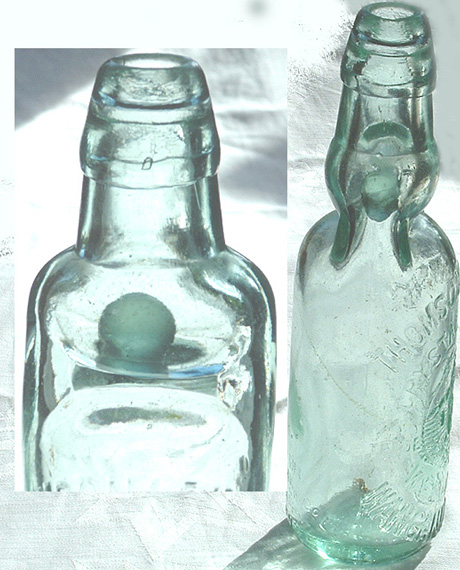
The Codd-neck bottle is designed to contain a marble which seals in the carbonation.

In 1872, soft drink maker Hiram Codd of Camberwell, London, designed and patented the Codd-neck bottle, designed specifically for carbonated drinks. The Codd-neck bottle encloses a marble and a rubber washer/gasket in the neck. The bottles were filled upside down, and pressure of the gas in the bottle forced the marble against the washer, sealing in the carbonation. The bottle was pinched into a special shape to provide a chamber into which the marble was pushed to open the bottle. This prevented the marble from blocking the neck as the drink was poured.

Soon after its introduction, the bottle became extremely popular with the soft drink and brewing industries mainly in the UK and the rest of Europe, Asia, and Australasia, though some alcohol drinkers disdained the use of the bottle. R. White's, the biggest soft drinks company in London and south-east England when the bottle was introduced, was among the companies that sold their drinks in Codd's glass bottles. One etymology of the term codswallop originates from beer sold in Codd bottles, though this is generally dismissed as a folk etymology.

The bottles were produced for many decades, but gradually declined in usage. Since children smashed the bottles to retrieve the marbles, vintage bottles are relatively rare and have become collector items, particularly in the UK. Due to the risk of explosion and injuries from fragmented glass pieces, use of this type of bottle is discouraged in most countries, since other methods of sealing pressurized bottles can more easily incorporate release of unsafe pressures. The Codd-neck design is still used for the Japanese soft drink Ramune, and in the Indian drink called Banta.

==== Soda makers ====
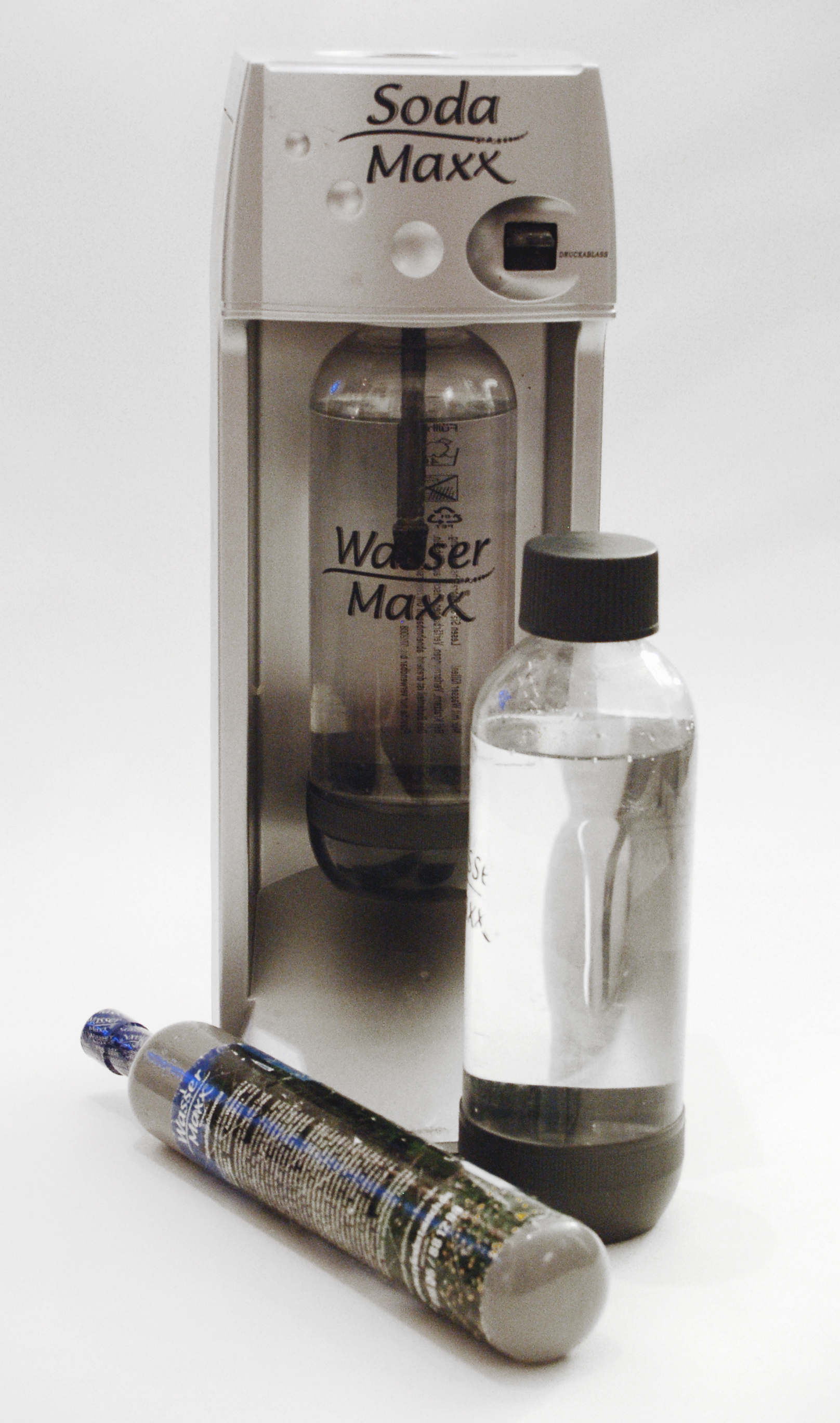
A typical all-in-one soda maker for home use found in supermarkets. A refillable carbon dioxide canister and a high-pressure bottle are often included.

Soda makers or soda carbonators are appliances that carbonate water with multiple-use carbon dioxide canisters. A variety of systems are produced by manufacturers and hobbyists. The commercial units may be sold with concentrated syrup for making flavored soft drinks.

One major producer of soda carbonators is SodaStream. Their products were popular during the 1970s and 1980s in the United Kingdom, and are associated with nostalgia for that period and have experienced a comeback in the 2000s.

=== Commercial ===
A modern bar soda gun

The process of dissolving carbon dioxide in water is called carbonation. Commercial soda water in siphons is made by chilling filtered plain water to 8 °C (46 °F) or below, optionally adding a sodium or potassium based alkaline compound such as sodium bicarbonate to neutralize the acid created when pressurizing the water with carbon dioxide (which creates high 8-10 pH carbonic acid-bicarbonate buffer solution when dissolved in water). The gas dissolves in the water, and a top-off fill of carbon dioxide is added to pressurize the siphon to approximately 120 pounds per square inch (830 kPa), some 30 to 40 psi (210–280 kPa) higher than is present in fermenting champagne bottles.

In many modern restaurants and bars soda water is manufactured on-site using devices known as carbonators. Carbonators use mechanical pumps to pump water into a pressurized chamber where it is combined with carbon dioxide from pressurized tanks at approximately 100 psi (690 kPa). The pressurized carbonated water then flows either directly to taps or mixing heads where flavoring is added before dispensing.

== Uses ==
=== Carbonated beverages ===
Carbonated water is a key ingredient in soft drinks, beverages that typically consist of carbonated water, a sweetener, and a flavoring such as cola, ginger, or citrus.

Plain carbonated water or sparkling mineral water is often consumed as an alternative to soft drinks or alcoholic beverages. Club soda is carbonated water to which compounds such as sodium bicarbonate or potassium sulfate have been added. Many manufacturers produce unsweetened sparkling water products that are lightly flavored by the addition of aromatic ingredients such as essential oils. Carbonated water is often mixed with fruit juice to make sparkling alcoholic and non-alcoholic punches.

=== Alcoholic beverages ===
Carbonated water is a diluent mixed with alcoholic beverages where it is used to top-off the drink and provides a degree of 'fizz'.

Adding soda water to "short" drinks such as spirits dilutes them and makes them "long" (not to be confused with long drinks such as those made with vermouth). Carbonated water is often added to drinks made with whiskey, brandy, and Campari to create a highball or variation. Soda water may be used to dilute drinks based on cordials such as orange squash. Soda water is a necessary ingredient in many cocktails, such as whiskey and soda or Campari and soda.

=== Cooking ===
Carbonated water is increasingly popular in Western cooking as a substitute for plain water in deep-frying batters to provide a lighter texture to doughs similar to tempura. Kevin Ryan, a food scientist at the University of Illinois at Urbana–Champaign, says the effervescent bubbles when mixed with dough provide a light tempura-like texture, which gives the illusion of being lower calorie than regular frying batters. The lightness is caused by pockets of carbon dioxide gas being introduced into the batter (a process which natural rising using yeast also creates) and further expanding when cooked.

=== Stain remover ===
Since the dissolved gas in carbonated water acts as a temporary surfactant, it has been recommended as a household remedy for removing stains, particularly those of red wine.

Five things

Seltzer water flavors are sometimes a source for novelty games such as "neverending five things".

== See also ==
- Premix and postmix
- Soda jerk
- Sodium carbonate
- Tonic water
- Limnic eruption – in deep water lakes, a massive, sudden eruption of dissolved carbon dioxide
