= Johann Jacob Schweppe =

German-Swiss scientist (1740–1821)

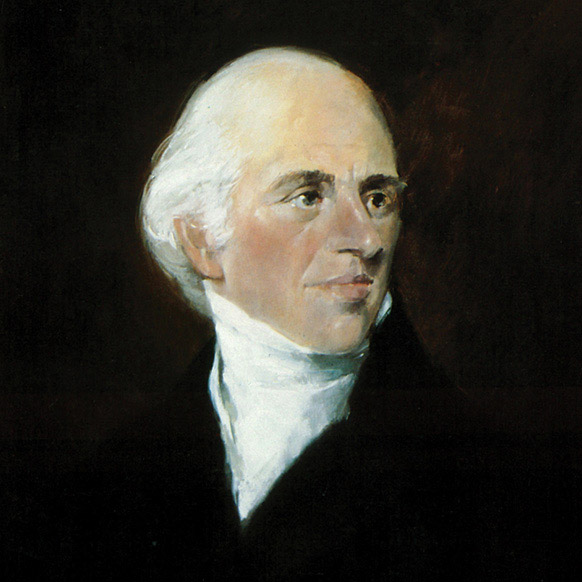
- Born: 16 March 1740; Witzenhausen, Landgraviate of Hesse-Kassel, Holy Roman Empire
- Died: 18 November 1821 (aged 81); Geneva, Switzerland
- Occupations: Watchmaker; jeweler; scientist; beverage company founder
- Years active: 1765−1821
- Known for: Manufacturing carbonated mineral water, company founder
- Notable work: Schweppes founder

Johann Jacob Schweppe (/ˈʃvɛpə/ SHVEP-ə, German: [ˈjoːhan ˈjaːkɔp ˈʃvɛpə]; 16 March 1740 – 18 November 1821) was a German watchmaker and amateur scientist who developed the first practical process to manufacture bottled carbonated mineral water and began selling the world's first bottled soft drink, His company, Schweppes, regards Priestley as "the father of our industry".

== Biography ==
Schweppe was born in Witzenhausen in the Landgraviate of Hesse-Kassel. He moved to Geneva in 1765 to work as a watchmaker and jeweler. He founded the Schweppes company there in 1783 to produce carbonated water.

At the time Schweppe was developing these products, the addition of carbon dioxide to water was considered to have medicinal properties. In 1792, he moved to London to develop the business there, but it was not successful and failed in 1795. However, Erasmus Darwin, the grandfather of Charles Darwin, began talking up the beverage, which started to become popular. Schweppe returned to Geneva and died in 1821. In 1831, King William IV of the United Kingdom adopted the beverage, enabling the use of the famous "by appointment to". Subsequently, carbonated water became very popular.
