= Schweppes =

Soft drink brand used by companies such as Coca-Cola, Suntory, etc

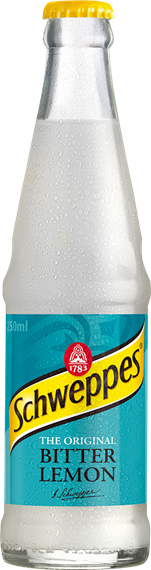
- Type: Carbonated mineral water
- Manufacturer: Keurig Dr Pepper
- Distributor: The Coca-Cola Company (Albania, Algeria, Argentina, Belarus, Bosnia and Herzegovina, Brazil, Bulgaria, Chile, Colombia, Costa Rica, Croatia, Ecuador, Egypt, Estonia, Greece, Iceland, India, Indonesia, Ireland, Japan, Kazakhstan, Latvia, Lebanon, Lithuania, Malaysia, Malta, Moldova, Montenegro, Morocco, North Macedonia, New Zealand, Papua New Guinea, Philippines, Romania, Russia, Saudi Arabia, Serbia, Slovenia, South America, South Africa, South Korea, Thailand, Turkey, Tunisia, Trinidad & Tobago, Ukraine, United Kingdom, and Vietnam); Jafora-Tabori (Israel); PepsiCo (United States and Canada); Asahi Beverages (Australia); Suntory (Andorra, Austria, Belgium, Czech Republic, Denmark, Finland, France, Germany, Hungary, Italy, Liechtenstein, Luxembourg, Monaco, Netherlands, Norway, Poland, Portugal, San Marino, Slovakia, Spain, Sweden, and Switzerland); Swire Coca-Cola (China, Hong Kong, and Taiwan)
- Origin: Geneva, Republic of Geneva
- Introduced: 1783; 243 years ago
- Website: schweppes.com

Schweppes (/ʃwɛps/ SHWEPS, German: [ʃvɛps]) is a British soft drink brand founded in Geneva in 1783 by the German watchmaker and amateur scientist Johann Jacob Schweppe; it is now made, bottled, and distributed worldwide by multiple international conglomerates, depending on licensing and region, that manufacture and sell soft drinks. Schweppes was one of the earliest forms of a soft drink, originally being regular soda water created in 1783. Various types of lemonades, tonic waters and ginger ales also carry the Schweppes name.

The company has held the British royal warrant since 1836 and was the official sponsor of Prince Albert's Great Exhibition in Hyde Park, London in 1851.

== History ==
=== 18th century ===
In the late 18th century, German watchmaker and amateur scientist Johann Jacob Schweppe developed a process to manufacture bottled carbonated mineral water based on the discoveries of English chemist Joseph Priestley. Schweppe founded the Schweppes Company in Geneva in 1783 to sell carbonated water. In 1792, he moved to London to develop the business there.

=== 19th century ===
Schweppes had offices in Bristol and were selling carbonated Hotwells water in 1820. In 1843, Schweppes commercialised Malvern water at the Holywell Spring in the Malvern Hills, which was to become a favourite of the British Royal Family until parent company Coca-Cola closed the historic plant in 2010 to local outcry.

=== 20th century ===
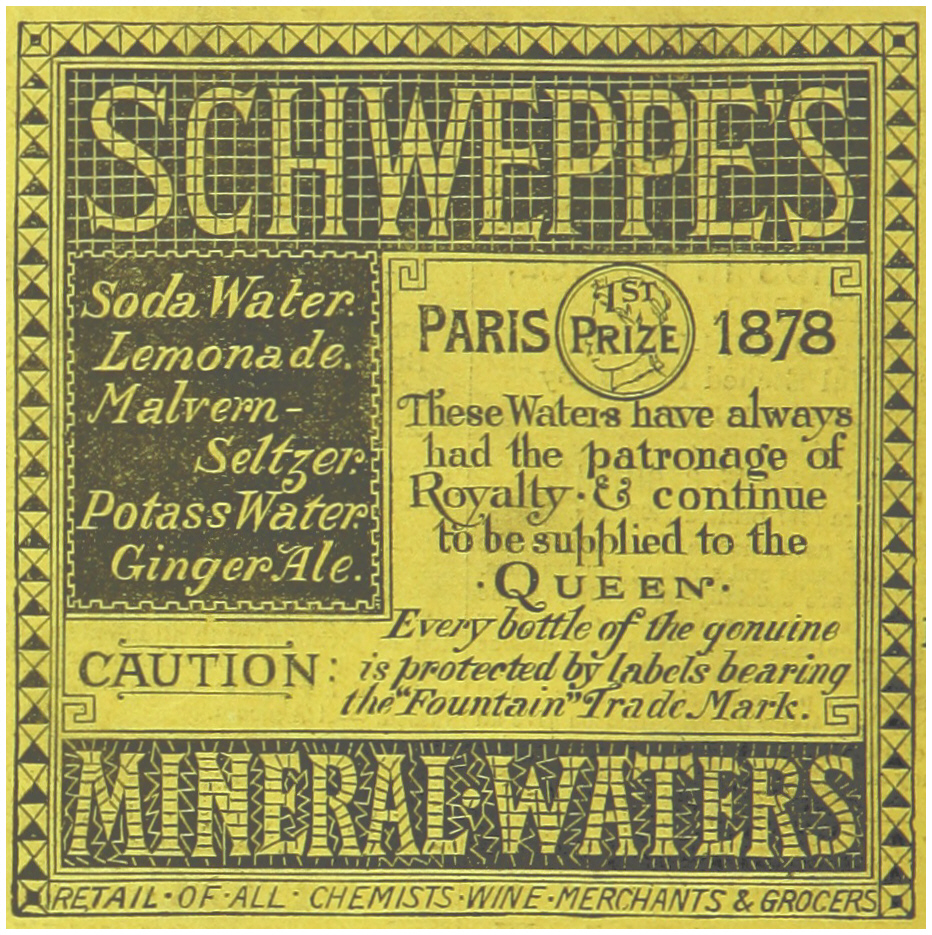
An 1883 advertisement for Schweppe's Mineral-Waters

During the 1920s and 1930s, the artist William Barribal created a range of posters for Schweppes. In 1946, the advertising agency S.T.Garland Advertising Service Ltd., London coined the word "Schweppervescence", which was used in banners advertising the brand during the Victory Day Parade in London. Thereafter it was used extensively in advertisements produced by Garlands, who sold copyright of this word to the Schweppes Company for £150 five years later when they relinquished the account.

An ad campaign in the 1950s and 1960s featured a real-life veteran British naval officer named Commander Whitehead, who described the product's bubbly flavour (effervescence) as "Schweppervescence". Comedian Benny Hill also appeared in a series of Schweppes TV commercials in the 1960s. Another campaign in the 1950s and 1960s, "Schweppeshire", was written by Stephen Potter, best known for his parodies of self-help books, and their film and television derivatives. Another campaign, voiced by the English actor William Franklyn, made use of onomatopoeia in their commercials: "Schhh… You know who." after the sound of the gas escaping as one opens the bottle.

In 1969, the Schweppes Company merged with Cadbury to become Cadbury Schweppes PLC. In 1993, Cadbury Schweppes increased its stake in American company Dr Pepper/Seven Up (DPSU) to 25.9%, acquiring 45% two years later in 1995, and acquiring Dr Pepper/Seven Up Bottling Group in 1999.

=== 21st century ===
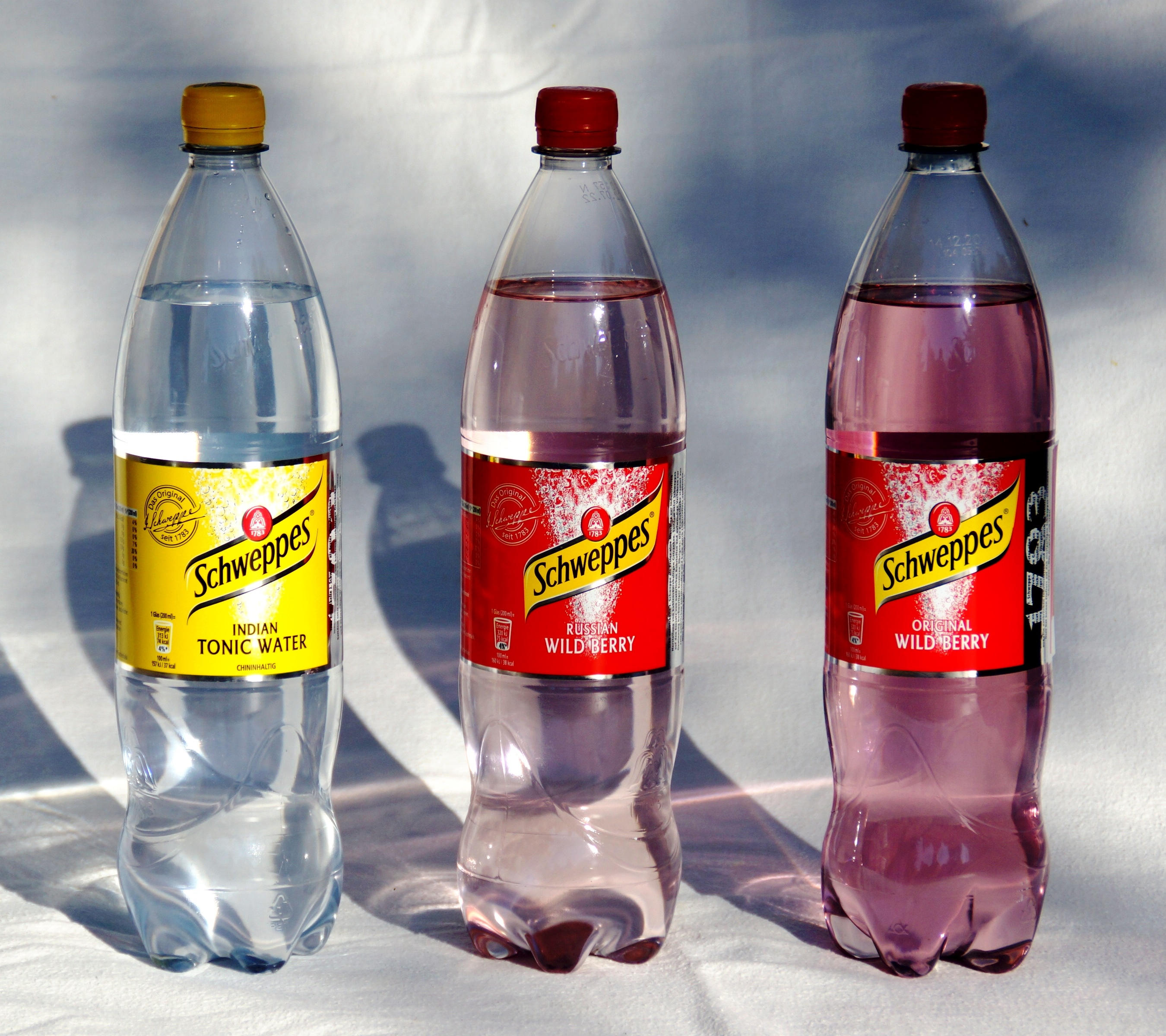
Some Schweppes products in the 21st century

In 2006, Cadbury Schweppes bought out the remaining 53% of the Carlyle Group's shares and 2% of the management's shares, after which Cadbury Schweppes Americas Beverages absorbed all the assets of Dr Pepper/Seven Up, Inc. (which included Mott's Beverages and Snapple Beverages), while Dr Pepper/Seven Up Bottling Group was merged with other bottling companies acquired by Cadbury and renamed Cadbury Schweppes Bottling Group. After acquiring many other brands in the ensuing years, the company was split in 2008, with its US beverage unit becoming Dr Pepper Snapple Group, Inc. (DPSG, Inc.) and separated from is the new holding company of the confectionery business Cadbury PLC (now part of Mondelez International). In 2018, Keurig Green Mountain acquired DPSG, and became Keurig Dr Pepper. It is the current owner of the Schweppes trademark in Canada and the United States.

The Coca-Cola Company owns the Schweppes brand in several territories, including 21 European countries through European Refreshments ULC. In a further 22 European countries, the brand is owned by Schweppes International Limited (a subsidiary of Suntory).

In China, Hong Kong and Taiwan, Swire's subsidiary Swire Coca-Cola produces Schweppes branded beverages.

The Japanese Asahi Group bought Schweppes Australia in 2008 from Cadbury, and owns the trademark in Australia.

Mainstay Schweppes products include ginger ale (1870), bitter lemon (1957), and tonic water (the first carbonated tonic – 1871).

== See also ==
- Schweppes Australia
- List of bottling companies
