= Passiona =

Australian soft drink

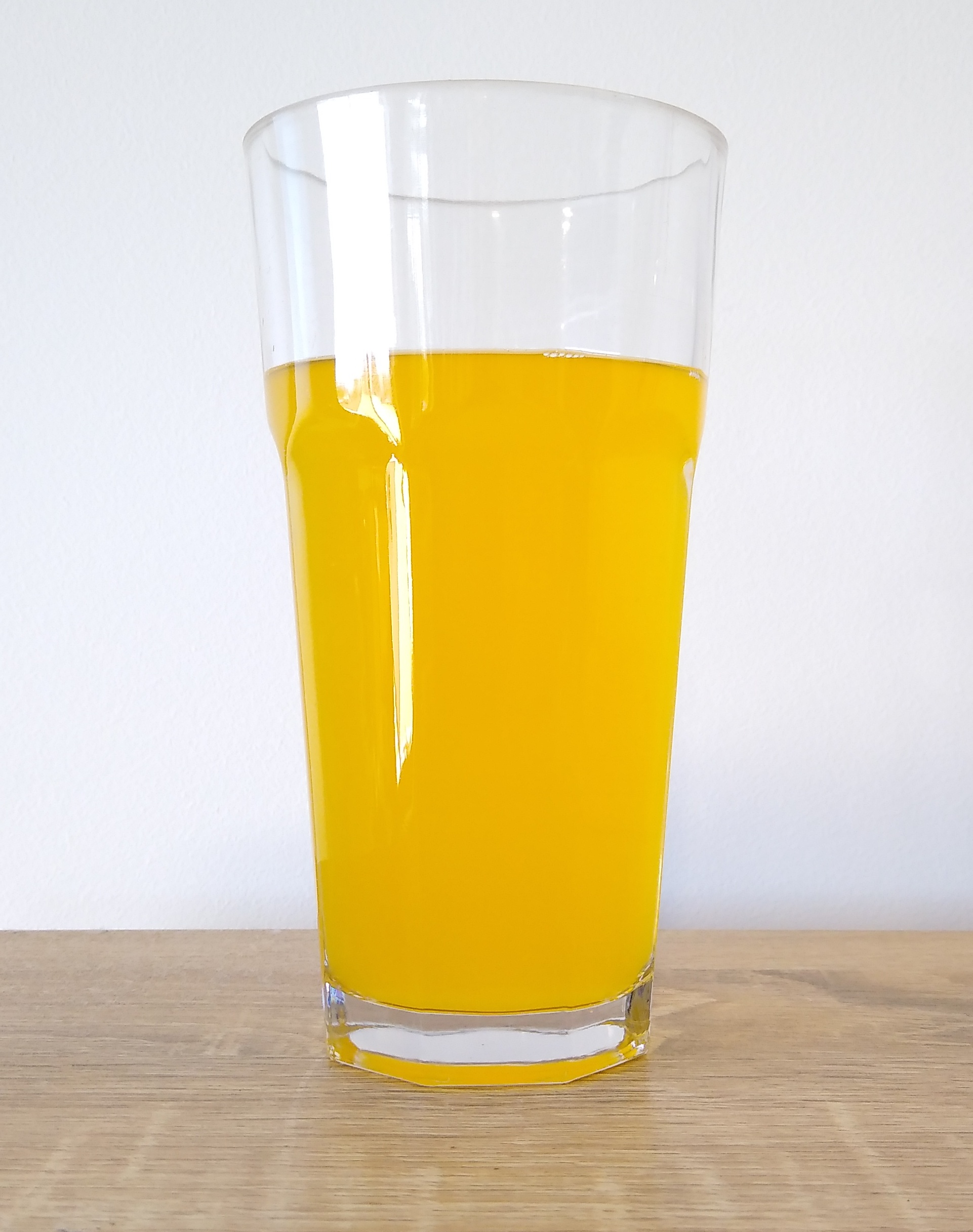
- Type: Soft drink
- Manufacturer: Schweppes Australia
- Origin: Australia
- Introduced: 1925; 101 years ago

Passiona is an Australian passionfruit-flavoured soft drink currently manufactured by Asahi Beverages (formerly Schweppes Australia) and originally Cottee's.

== History ==
Originally developed as a cordial by Lismore dairy farmer Spencer Cottee during the 1920s to avoid wasting excess passionfruit on his farm, when carbonated Passiona became a foundation product of the Cottee's range. Passiona was first manufactured in 1924, and described in writing in an address to the Mullumbimby Chamber of Commerce by Spencer Cottee 1925.

On January 17, 1925, Cottee filed an Australian trade mark application for a logo of the words "Passiona", which remains current (in the name of Asahi Group Holdings).

In 1926, a factory was set up in Sydney, and in 1927 the drink was marketed to the public.

Newspaper reports from the 1930s mention Australians taking the drink with them overseas to Canada and Jerusalem. In 1934, Cottees Passiona Ltd reported a gross profit of £609.

Cottee granted licences to produce the drink to a number of now defunct Australian bottlers, including Geo. Hall & Sons in South Australia and Bowral Bottlers in the NSW Southern Highlands. The trademark has also been used by Cottee's jelly crystal range.

=== Promotion ===
It was heavily promoted by Asahi, including advertisements by pop singer Paul Kelly, the worship music band Planetshakers, and in Garfield: The Movie. Historically, Passiona has been endorsed as a drink of choice within the Australian Senate, with statements made by senators being used in official advertisements.

== Ingredients ==
The passionfruit pulp was originally supplied from not only Australian mainland growers, but later also a Norfolk Island cooperative. Cottee's then established plants in New Guinea in the highlands at Goroka and Mt. Hagen.
