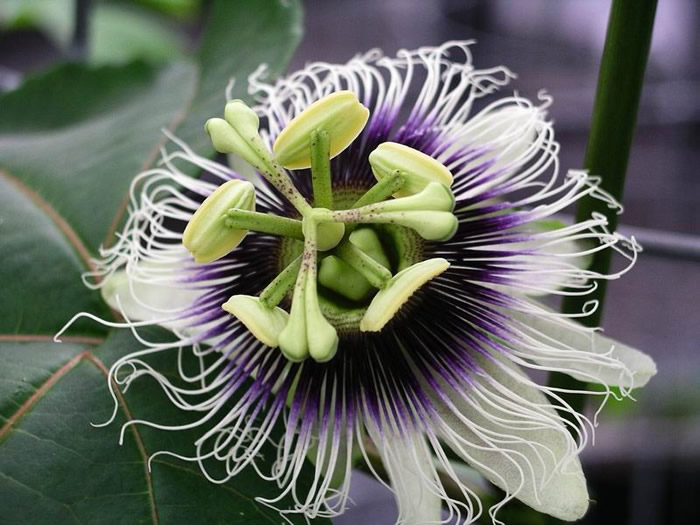
- Flower
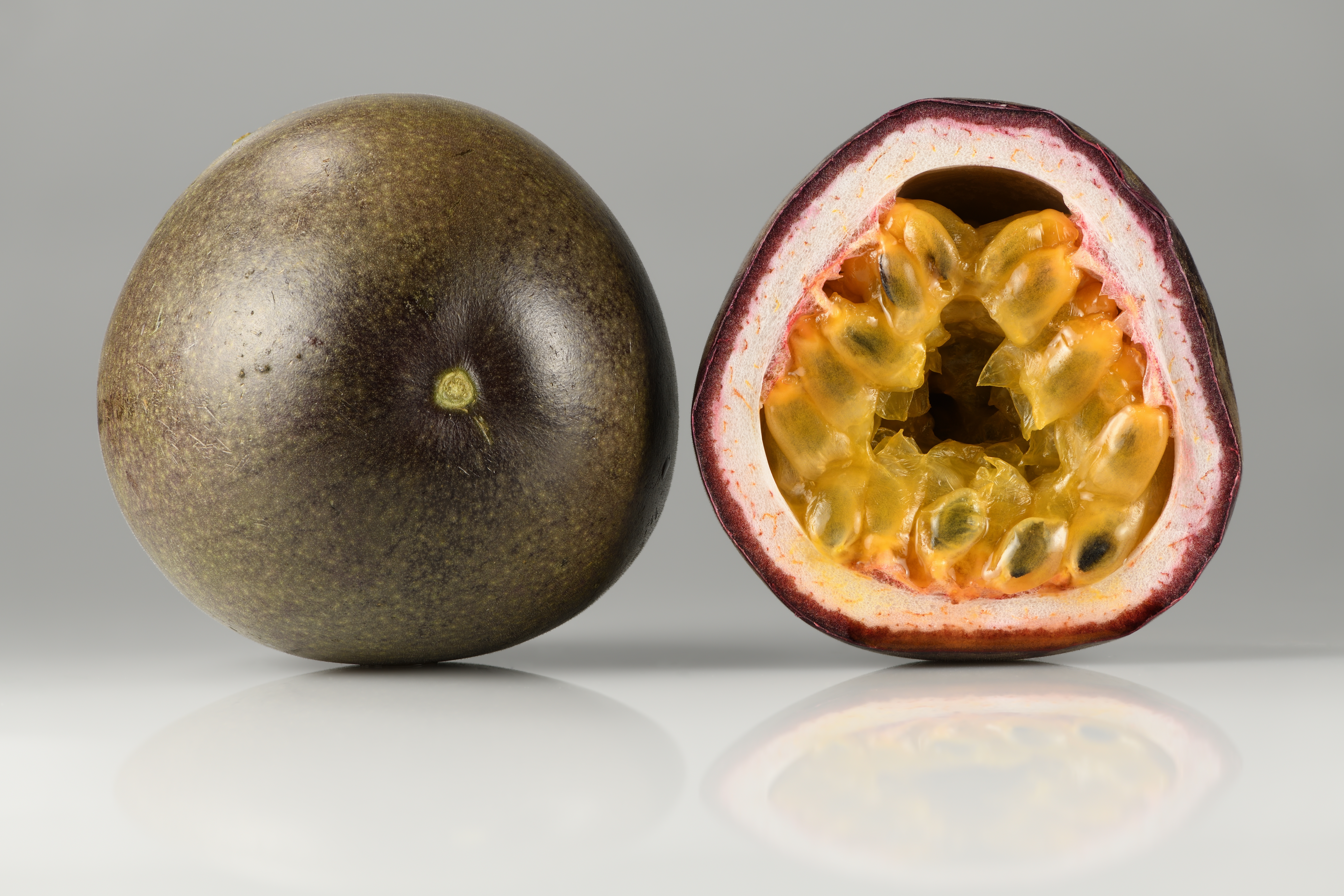
- Fruit

Scientific classification
- Kingdom: Plantae
- Clade: Tracheophytes
- Clade: Angiosperms
- Clade: Eudicots
- Clade: Rosids
- Order: Malpighiales
- Family: Passifloraceae
- Genus: Passiflora
- Species: P. edulis

Binomial name
- Passiflora edulis Sims, 1818

= Passiflora edulis =

Species of flowering plant in the passion flower family

Passiflora edulis, commonly known as passion fruit, is a vine species of passion flower native to southern Brazil, through Paraguay, and northern Argentina. The fruit is a pepo, a type of botanical berry, round to oval, either yellow or dark purple at maturity, with a soft to firm, juicy interior filled with numerous seeds.

The plant is cultivated commercially in tropical and subtropical areas for its sweet, seedy fruit. This is both eaten and juiced, with the juice often added to other fruit juices to enhance aroma.

== Etymology ==
The passion fruit is so called because it is the fruit of one of the many species of passion flower, the English translation of the Latin genus name, Passiflora. Around 1700, the name was given by missionaries in Brazil as an educational aid while trying to convert the indigenous inhabitants to Christianity; its name was flor das cinco chagas or "flower of the five wounds" to illustrate the crucifixion of Christ, with other plant components also named after an emblem in the Passion of Jesus.

== Description ==
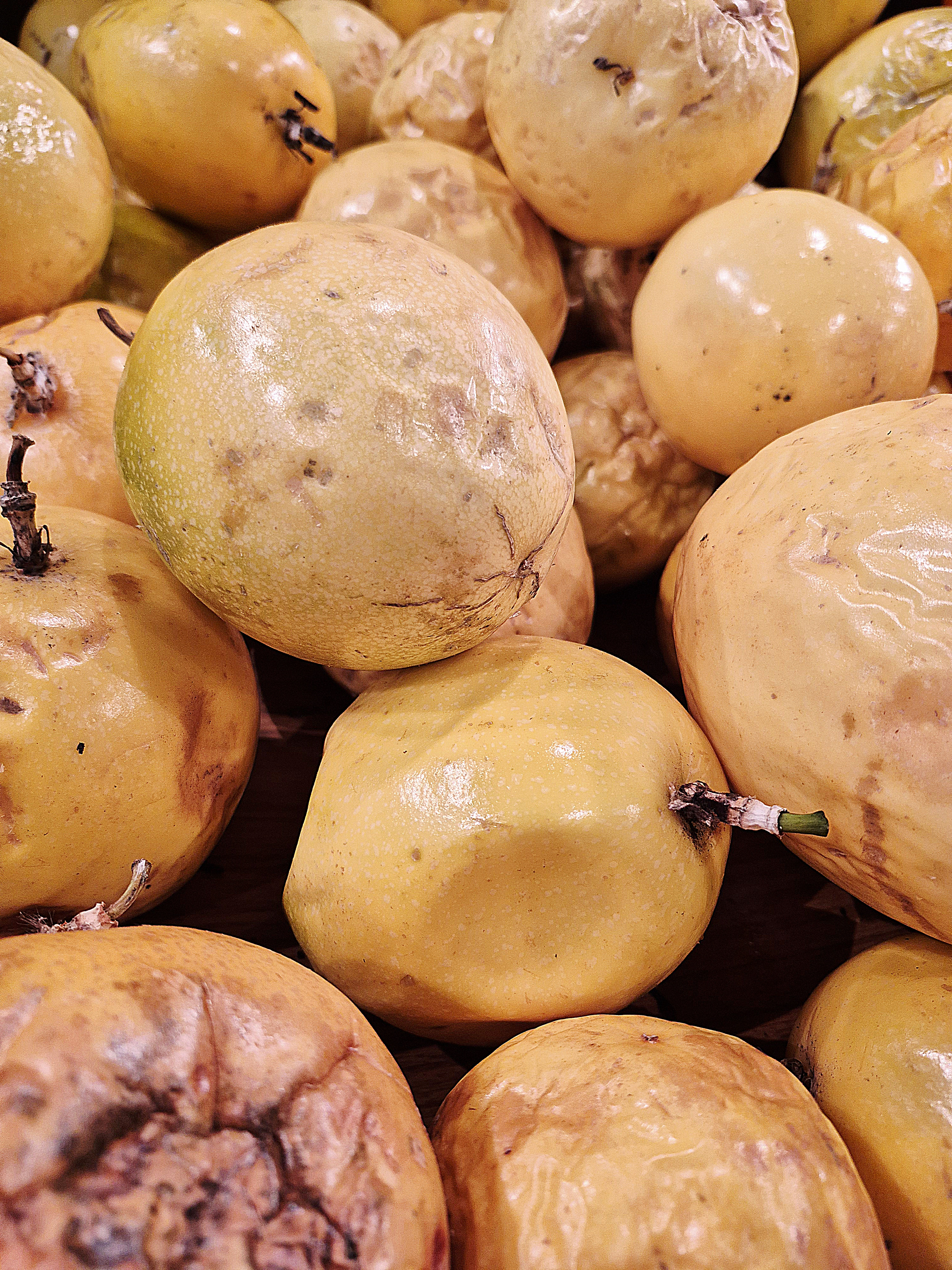
Passion fruits for sale in a supermarket in Brazil

Passiflora edulis is a perennial vine; tendrils are borne in leaf axils, and have a red or purple hue when young. There are two main varieties: a purple-fruited type, P. edulis f. edulis, and the yellow-fruited P. edulis f. flavicarpa.

Usually the vine produces a single flower 5–7.5 cm wide at each node. The flower has 5 oblong, green sepals and 5 white petals. The sepals and petals are 4–6 mm in length and form a fringe. The base of the flower is a rich purple with 5 stamens, an ovary, and a branched style. The styles bend backward and the stigmas, which are located on top of the styles, have a very distinct head.

The fruit produced is a pepo and entirely fleshy (making it botanically a berry) and is spherical to ovoid. The outside color of the pepo ranges from dark purple with fine white specks to light yellow. The fruit is 4–7.5 cm in diameter; purple fruits are smaller, weighing around 35 grams, while yellow fruits are closer to 80 grams. The smooth, leathery rind is 9–13 mm thick, including a thick layer of pith. Within the pepo, there are typically 250 brown seeds, each 2.4 mm in length. Each seed is surrounded by a membranous sac filled with pulpy juice. The flavor of the juice is slightly acidic and musky. The passion fruit's flavor can be compared to the guava fruit.

=== Phytochemicals ===
Several varieties of passion fruit are rich in polyphenol content. Yellow varieties of the fruit were found to contain prunasin and other cyanogenic glycosides in the peel and juice. (Note: Specific mention of P. edulis f. flavicarpa juice and peel)

=== Varieties ===
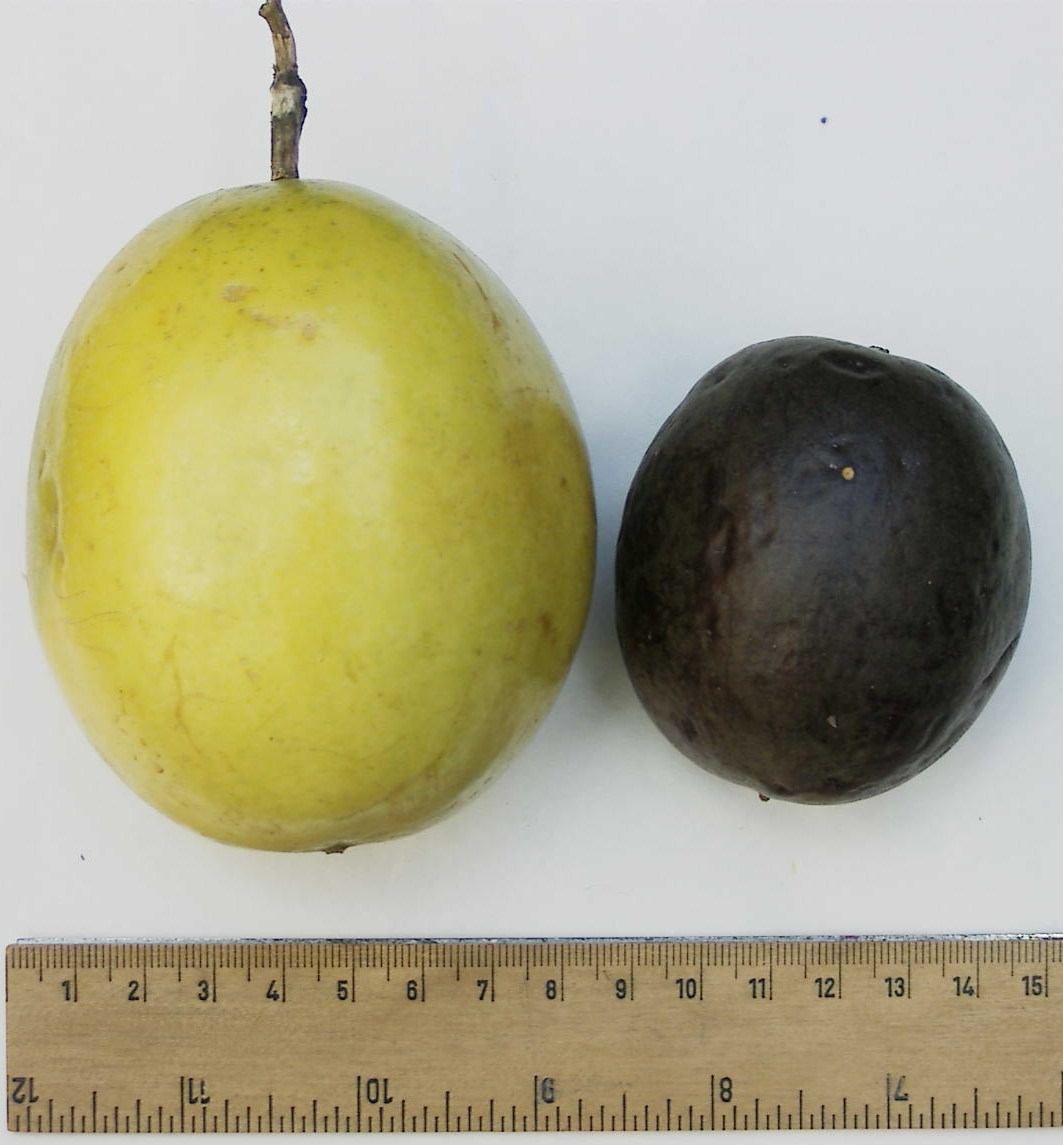
Yellow and purple passion fruit variety (P. edulis var. flavicarpa) comparison

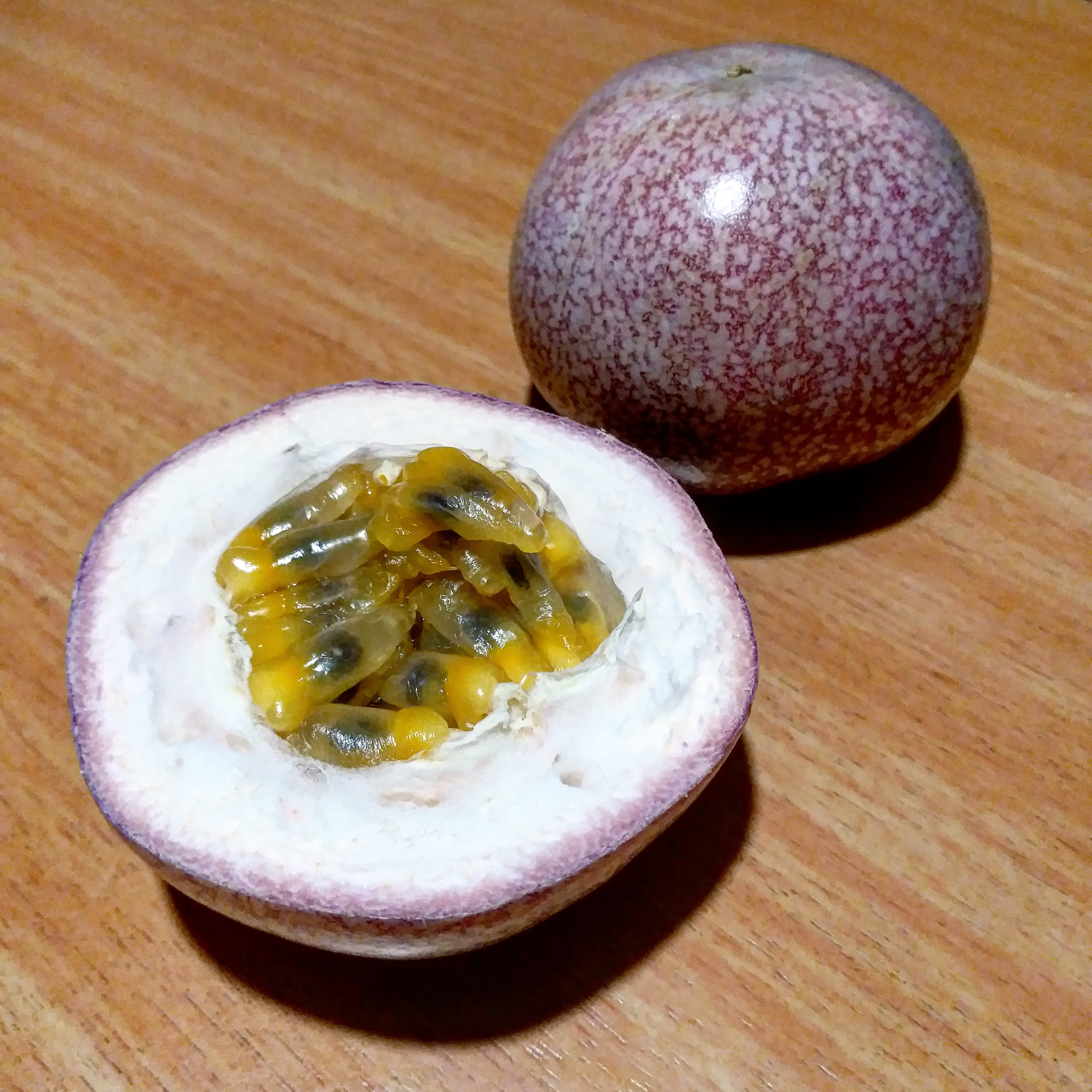

Several distinct varieties of passion fruit with clearly differing exterior appearances exist. The bright yellow flavicarpa variety, also known as yellow or golden passion fruit, can grow up to the size of a grapefruit, has a smooth, glossy, light, and airy rind, and has been used as a rootstock for purple passion fruit in Australia. The dark purple edulis variety is smaller than a lemon, though it is less acidic than yellow passion fruit, and has a richer aroma, sweeter pulp, and flavour.

== Distribution and habitat ==
The species is native to the region of southern Brazil through Paraguay to northern Argentina.

== Cultivation ==
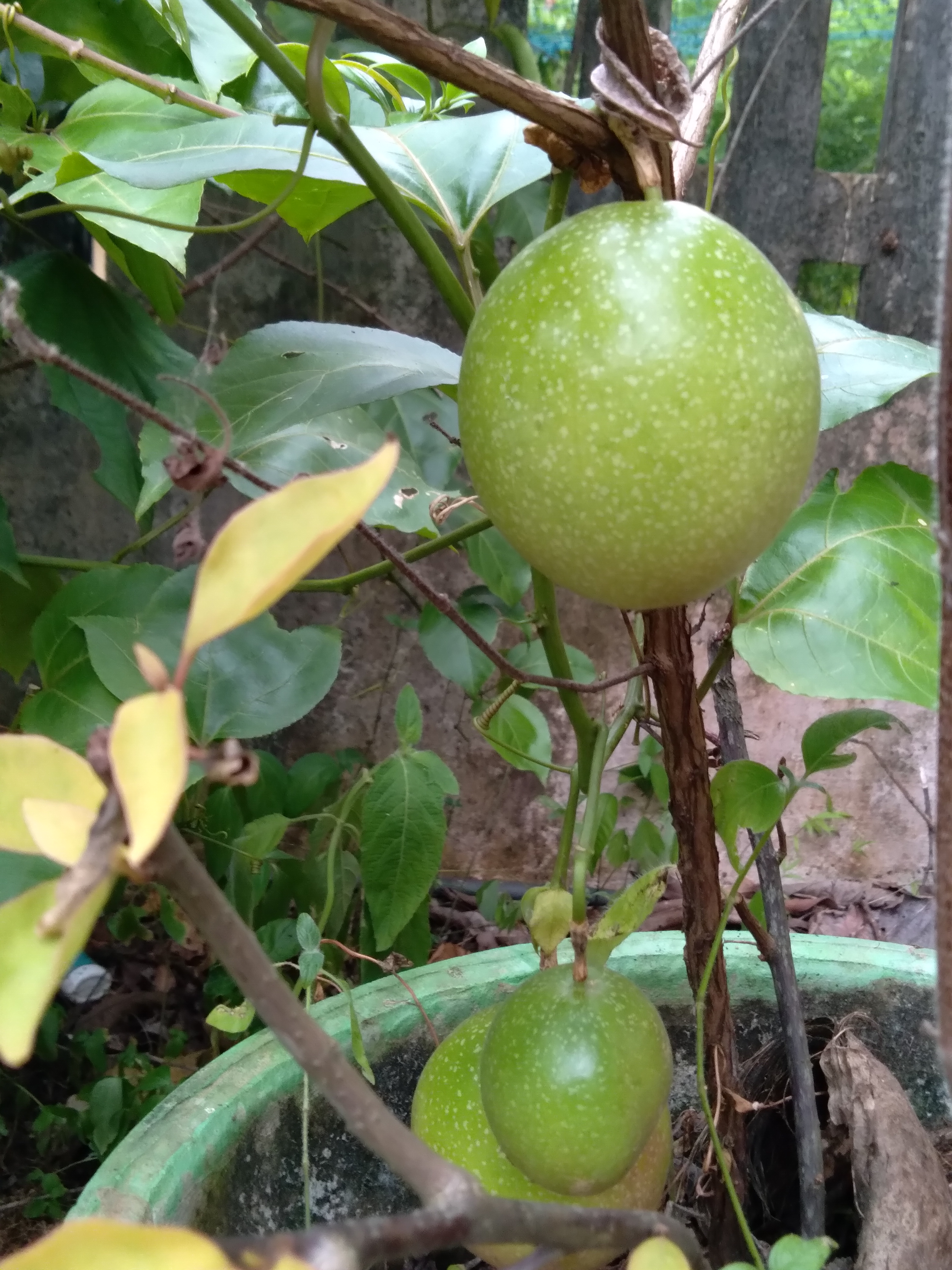
Unripe passion fruit

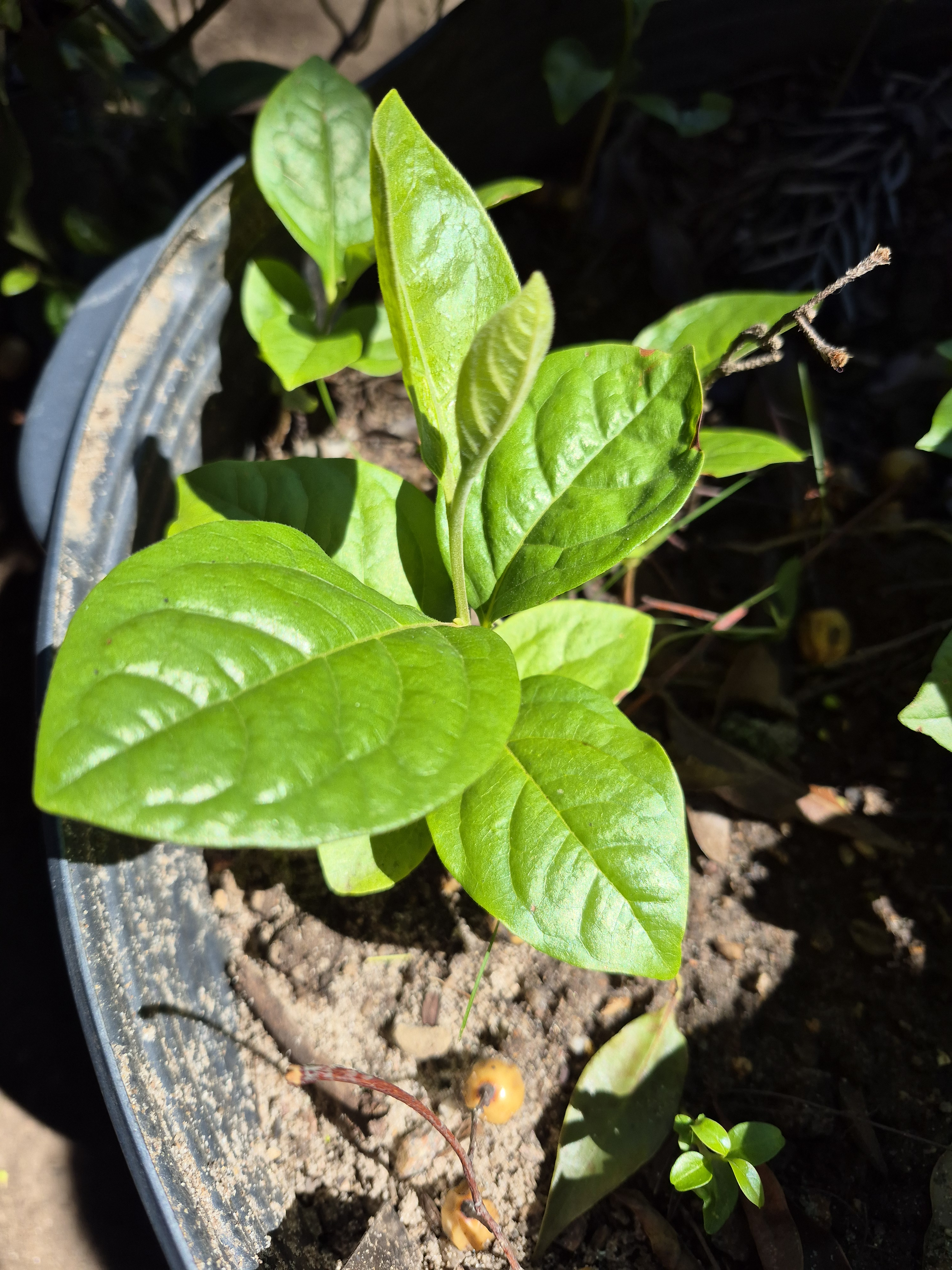
Seedling

Passion fruit is widely grown in tropical and semitropical regions of the world. In the United States, it is cultivated in Florida, Hawaii, and California. It generally has to be protected from frost, although certain cultivars have survived light frosts after heavy pruning of affected areas.

=== Pollination ===
The flower of the yellow-fruited form of the passion fruit plant is self-sterile, while that of the purple-fruited form is self-compatible. In California, it is reported that pollination of flowers is most effective when done by the carpenter bee. There are three types of yellow passion fruit flowers, classified by curvature of style. To help assure the presence of carpenter bees, some gardeners place decaying logs near the vines, which provide shelter for the bees.

=== Diseases ===
==== Viruses ====
Passion fruit woodiness virus is one of the most well-known viruses to the passion fruit. It belongs to the Potyvirus group and can attack a plant at any age from nursery to mature plants. Some features include yellow leaves that display distortion in the leaf length and shape. As well as affecting the leaf, this virus influences fruit shape and size. Affected fruits become stone-like and much smaller than normal, with many fruits becoming scabbed and cracked. The virus is spread by sap-sucking insects such as aphids and mites. Woodiness can also spread through vegetation propagation such as infected scions or contaminated tools. There is no chemical control for this virus once the plant is infected, but the use of clean planting material can reduce its dissemination.

One of the most serious viruses pertaining to vegetation is the cucumber mosaic virus. In the passion fruit, this virus appears with yellow mottling on leaves starting at random points on the vine and diminishing in intensity towards the tip. Expanding leaves typically become twisted, curl downward, and develop a "shoestring" appearance as a result of a restriction of the leaf surface. It is mobile and can spread easily through interactions with other plants such as brushing between leaves. This virus is naturally transmitted through aphids and can also be transmitted mechanically through seedlings. Varietal resistance is the primary management tool, and eliminating weeds and infected perennial ornamentals that may harbor the virus is critical. Once the plant has been infected, there is no possible management or control for the virus.

==== Phytoplasma ====
Overshooting is the term used when Phytoplasma, a specialized bacterium, attacks the phloem of a plant. Phytoplasma infection is characterized by chlorotic small leaves, shortening of internodes, excessive lateral shoots and abnormal flowers. Although there have been reports of this disease within the passion fruit plant, many infected plants are affected without visible signs of disease. Although Phytoplasma can be spread through grafting, it can be inhibited by periodic inspection of plant nurseries and areas that have had past infections. Overshooting responds to treatment with tetracycline, a common broad-spectrum antibiotic.

==== Bacteria ====
Bacterial leaf spot, which causes vein clearing, forms bright yellow colonies causing infection and leaf wilt and, eventually, deterioration of fruit pulp, especially of young fruits. Under favorable conditions for the bacteria, infection occurs through natural openings or wounds from other pathogens that affect leaf inter-cellular spaces. Fertilizers or a copper chloride and mancozeb mixture can control the intensity of the disease, but are not a cure.

The bacterial grease-spot of the passion fruit is caused by Pseudomonas syringae. It appears with olive-green to brown greasy-looking spots or brown, sunken circular lesions. On a later stage, a hard crust can cover the lesions showing a chlorotic halo. Affecting mainly the stomata, the grease-spot thrives in high temperatures and high relative humidity. To avoid infection, measures that may be adopted include planting seeds from healthy plants and using existing healthy areas. Fungicide controls can aid in preventing further infection.

==== Fungal diseases ====
Collar rot disease is caused by the fungus Fusarium solani. It is characterized by necrotic lesions at the collar region, browning of the stem at soil level, and dark discoloration of the stem. The rotting stem interferes with food and water transport within the plant, leading to withering of the plant until death. Infection occurs mostly through contaminated soil and infected plants which cause the plants to survive for only a few weeks. There are no chemical controls. Management includes planting seedlings in unaffected areas and using clean tools.

The fungus called fusarium wilt commonly occurs in adult plants and is caused by Fusarium oxysporum. The pathogen has ability to survive for long periods, penetrating roots, invading the xylem, and preventing the transport of water and nutrients to other organs of the plant. Once infected, this disease causes leaves to yellow and browning of the vascular system until they wilt and die. It occurs in any type of soil infecting all plants. Management of crops includes planting clean seedlings, uprooting and burning infected plants, and using sterilized tools.

The anthracnose, a canker caused by Colletotrichum gloeosporiodes, is a pathogen of the passion fruit creating dark and sunken lesions of the trunk. By attacking mature passion fruit trees, these lesions cause intense defoliation and fruit rot. Many leaves die due to the foliar lesions and the skin of fruits becomes papery. Under warm and humid conditions, this disease can worsen, causing red and orange spores eventually killing the plant. Infection is carried out through the residues of the passion flower, infected seeds, seedlings, and cuttings. Managing this disease involves a combination of using pathogen-free seedlings, eliminating infected areas, and improving ventilation and light conditions. Copper-based fungicides on injured areas can prevent the spread of disease.

== Uses ==
=== Nutrition ===
Passion fruit (granadilla) purple, raw per 100 grams
Nutritional value per 100 g (3.5 oz)
- Energy: 406 kJ (97 kcal)
- Carbohydrates: 22.4 g
- Sugars: 11.2 g
- Dietary fiber: 10.4 g
- Fat: 0.7 g
- Protein: 2.2 g
Vitamins and minerals
Vitamins	Quantity %DV^{†}
Vitamin A equiv. beta-Carotene	7% 64 μg 7% 743 μg
Riboflavin (B2)	10% 0.13 mg
Niacin (B3)	9% 1.5 mg
Vitamin B6	6% 0.1 mg
Folate (B9)	4% 14 μg
Choline	1% 7.6 mg
Vitamin C	33% 30 mg
Vitamin K	1% 0.7 μg
Minerals	Quantity %DV^{†}
Calcium	1% 12 mg
Iron	9% 1.6 mg
Magnesium	7% 29 mg
Phosphorus	5% 68 mg
Potassium	12% 348 mg
Sodium	1% 28 mg
Zinc	1% 0.1 mg
- Other constituents: Quantity
- Water: 72.9 g
- Full Link to USDA Database entry
- ^{†}Percentages estimated using US recommendations for adults, except for potassium, which is estimated based on expert recommendation from the National Academies.

Raw passion fruit is 73% water, 22% carbohydrates, 2% protein and 0.7% fat. In a reference amount of 100 g (3.5 oz), raw passion fruit supplies 97 calories and is a rich source (20% or more of the Daily Value, DV) of vitamin C (33% DV) and a moderate source (10–19% DV) of riboflavin and potassium. No other micronutrients are in significant content.

=== Culinary ===
Passion fruit has a variety of uses related to its favored taste as a whole fruit and juice.

- In Australia and New Zealand, it is available commercially both fresh and tinned. It is added to fruit salads, and fresh fruit pulp or passion fruit sauce is commonly used in desserts, including as a topping for pavlova (a regional meringue cake) and ice cream, a flavouring for cheesecake, and in the icing of vanilla slices. A passion-fruit–flavored soft drink called Passiona has also been manufactured in Australia since the 1920s. It can be used in some alcoholic cocktails.
- In Brazil, the term maracujá applies to passion fruit (maracujá azedo, or "sour") and granadillo (maracujá doce, or "sweet"). Passion fruit mousse is a common dessert and passion fruit pulp is used to decorate the tops of cakes. Passion fruit juice, ice pops, and soft drinks are also consumed. When making a caipirinha, passion fruit may be used instead of lime.
- In Cambodia, the red and yellow passion fruit grown in the Mondulkiri Province are used to produce wine and liquor.
- In Colombia and Costa Rica, it is used for juices and desserts.
- In the Dominican Republic, where it is locally called chinola, it is used to make juice and fruit preserves. Passion-fruit-flavored syrup is used on shaved ice, and the fruit is also eaten raw, sprinkled with sugar.
- In East Africa, passion fruit is used to make juice, and is commonly eaten as a whole fruit.
- In Hawaii, where it is known as lilikoʻi, fresh passion fruit pulp is eaten. Lilikoi-flavored syrup is used as a topping for shave ice, soft drinks, a glaze, and to marinate meat and vegetables. It is used as a flavoring for malasadas, cheesecakes, cookies, dessert bars, ice cream and mochi. Passion fruit is also used in jam or jelly, as well as a fruit curd known as "lilikoi butter".
- In India, the government of Andhra Pradesh started growing passion fruit vines in the Chintapalli (Vizag) forests to make fruit available within the region. The fruit is eaten raw, sprinkled with sugar, and is used to make juice.
- In Indonesia, where it is known as markisa, both edulis and flavicarpa varieties are cultivated and consumed differently. The former is normally eaten as is, while the latter is more commonly strained to obtain its juice, which is cooked with sugar to make passion fruit syrup used in drinks and desserts.
- In Mexico, passion fruit is used to make juice or is eaten raw with chili powder and lime.
- In Paraguay, passion fruit is used principally for its juice, to prepare desserts such as passion fruit mousse, cheesecake, ice cream, and to flavor yogurts and cocktails.
- In Peru, passion fruit has long been a staple in homemade ice pops called "marciano" or "chupetes". Passion fruit is also used in several desserts, especially mousses and cheesecakes. Passion fruit juice is also drunk on its own and is used in ceviche variations and in cocktails, including the Maracuyá sour, a variation of the Pisco sour. Granadilla, or "sweet", can be eaten raw.
- In the Philippines, passion fruit is commonly sold in public markets and in public schools. Some vendors sell the fruit with a straw to enable sucking out the seeds and juices inside.
- In Portugal, especially the Azores and Madeira, passion fruit is used as a base for a variety of liqueurs and mousses.
- In Puerto Rico, where the fruit is known as "parcha", it is used in juices, ice cream or pastries.
- In South Africa, passion fruit, known locally as granadilla (the yellow variety as guavadilla), is used to flavor yogurt, soft drinks, such as Schweppes' "Sparkling Granadilla", and numerous cordial drinks (in cordial flavors, it is referred to as passion fruit). It is often eaten raw or used as a topping for cakes and tarts. Granadilla juice is commonly available in restaurants. The yellow variety is used for juice processing, while the purple variety is sold in fresh fruit markets.
- In Sri Lanka, passion fruit juice, along with faluda, is a common refreshment. Passion fruit cordial is manufactured both at home as well as industrially by mixing the pulp with sugar.
- In Suriname, where it is known as markoesa, there are three varieties. The red and orange varieties are sold by markets and eaten as a fruit because of their natural sweet flavor. The sour yellow variety, widely grown in the coastal region, is used to make jam and juices with added sugar, either uncooked for instant use or cooked into a thick syrup for refrigerated storage. The juice is also used to flavor cocktails.
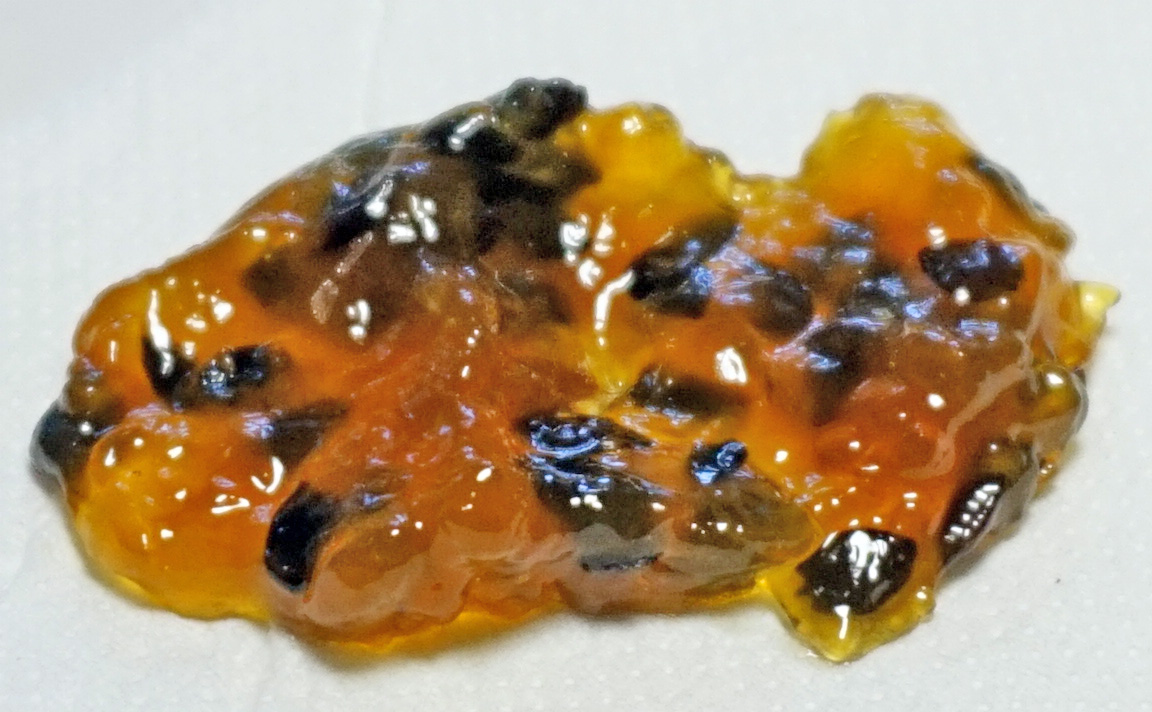
Passion fruit jam

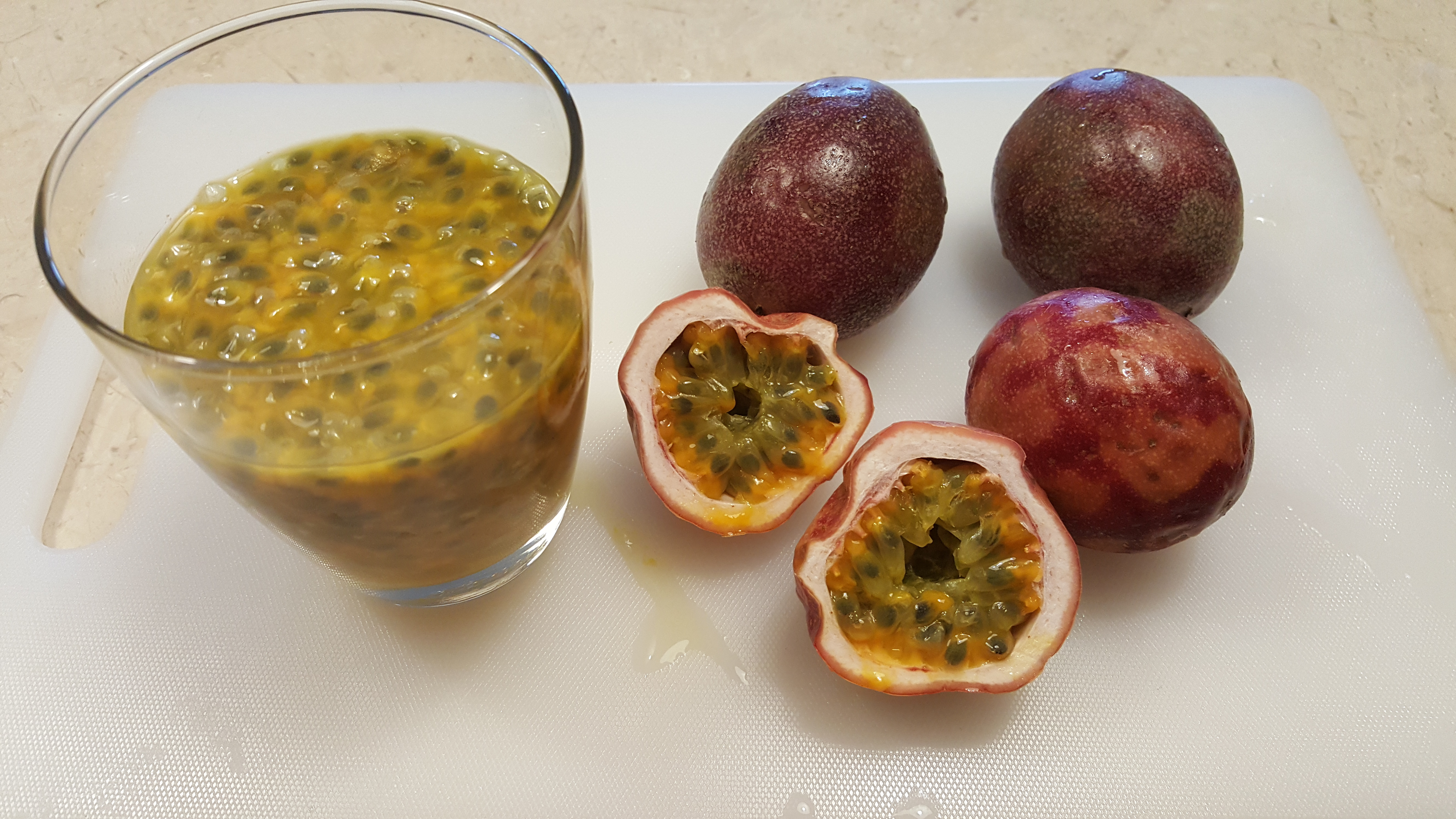
Home-made passion fruit juice

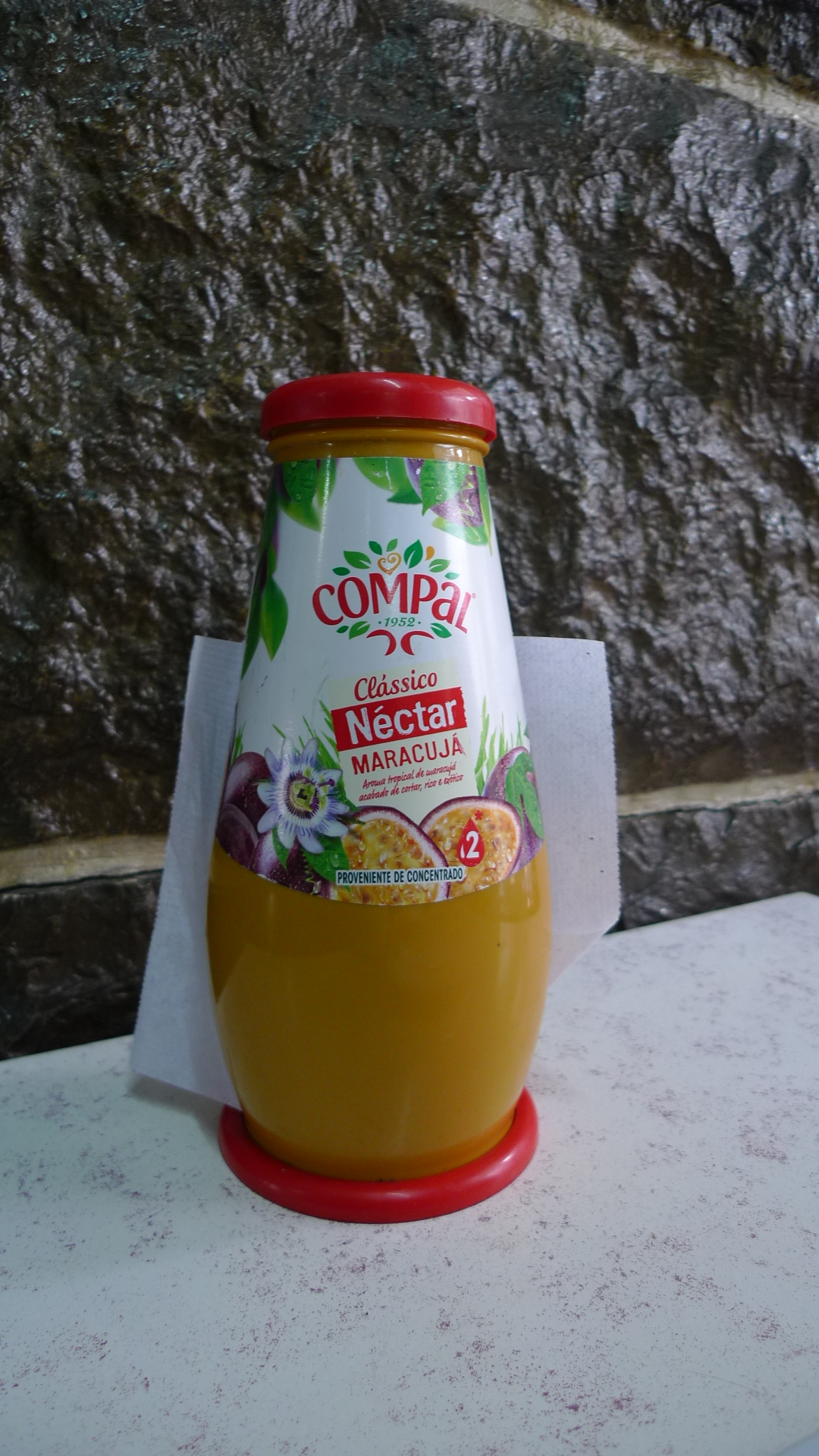
Passion fruit nectar

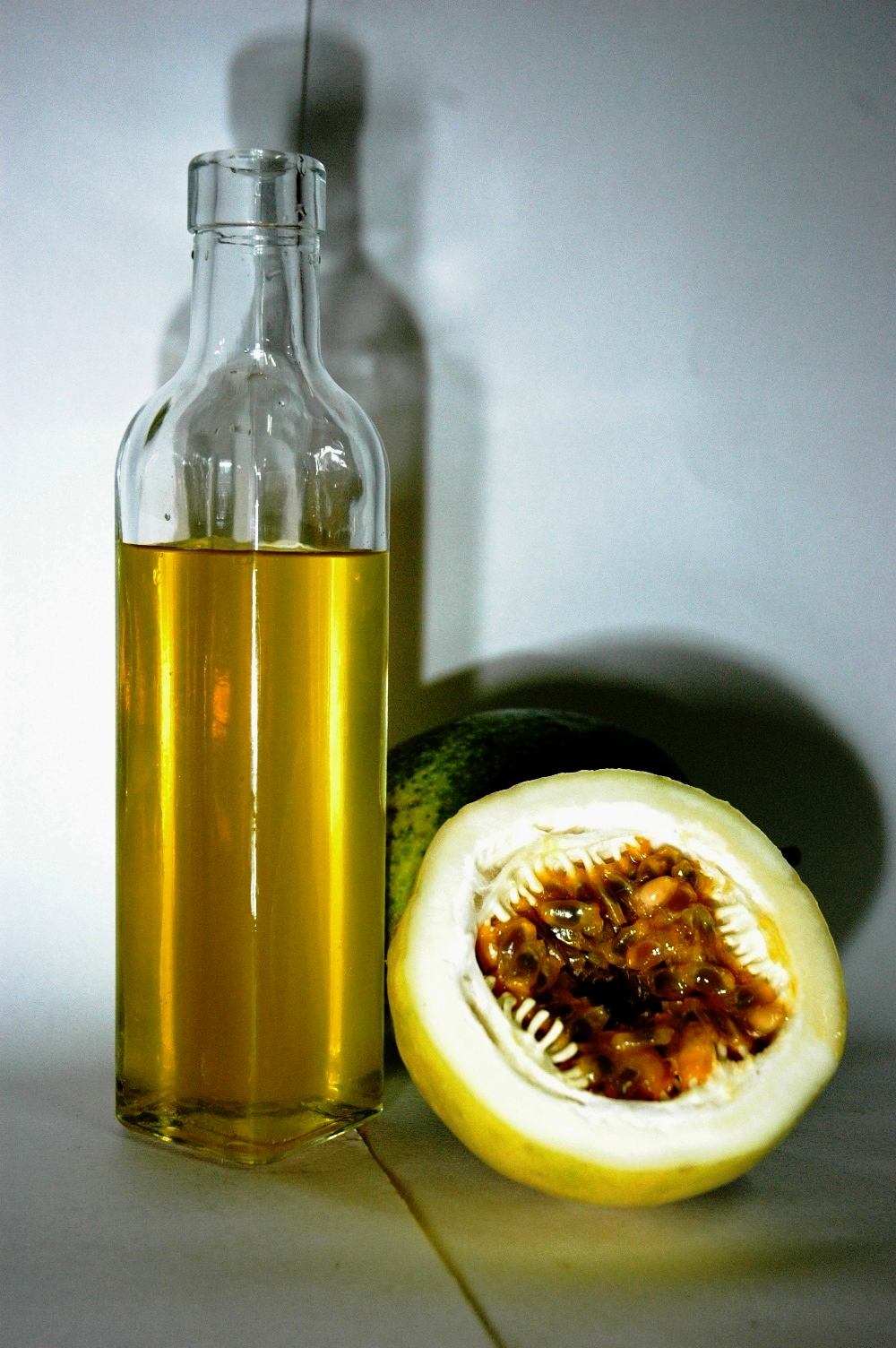
Passion fruit oil

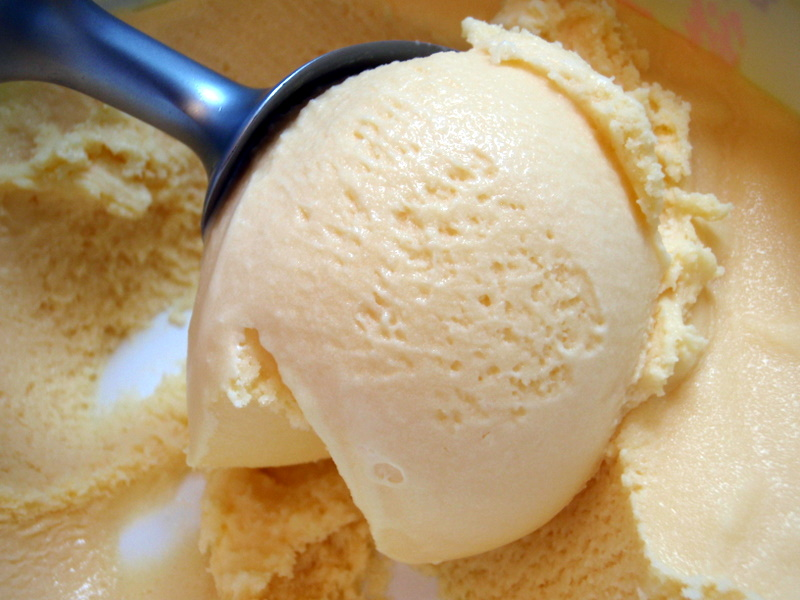
Passion fruit ice cream

== In culture ==
In 1884, the English Victorian painter Frank Dicksee anachronically represented a passion fruit vine growing up on a Solomonic column in his work Romeo and Juliet, today belonging to the Southampton City Art Gallery (United Kingdom). In 2006, singer-songwriter Paula Fuga released the popular song "Lilikoi", the Hawaiian language word for passion fruit; the song is featured on an album also named after the fruit.

== See also ==
- Banana passionfruit
- Passiflora incarnata
- Passiflora quadrangularis
