= Vodka soda =

Simple mixed drink

Vodka Soda
- A vodka soda in a highball glass with a lemon garnish. A bottle of soda water and vodka are obscured in the background.
- Type: Highball
- Other name(s): Vodka and Soda
- Ingredients: 1½ oz vodka; 4 oz club soda
- Base spirit: Vodka
- Standard drinkware: Highball glass
- Standard garnish: A slice of lemon or lime
- Served: With cubes of ice ("on the rocks")
- Preparation: Add vodka to the glass. Then add ice, and proceed to top the drink with soda water. Finally, garnish. A straw may be included, if desired.

A vodka soda (or vodka and soda) is a mixed drink of the highball variety which contains primarily vodka, soda, and ice. It may be garnished with lemon or lime. Splashes of various juices or other drink mixers etc. may be added as a variation to impart a subtle flavor to the drink. A general rule of thumb for the recipe is a 2:1 soda to vodka ratio. One notable quality of the libation is that it contains fewer calories than most other mainstream alcoholic beverages. It rose to particular prominence in the late-2010s along with hard seltzers (Note: Some hard seltzers, such as High Noon and Truly, contain vodka and carbonation (i.e. soda) as well as other juices, sweeteners, flavorings, etc. They may be anecdotally referred to as vodka sodas or even marketed this way. Other hard seltzers, e.g. White Claw, may (generally) be malt beverages, which would be incorrect to refer to in this manner.) as bar customers grew more health conscious. The beverage is sometimes loosely (or even lightheartedly) associated with women (especially young) attempting to watch their figure; it also has a following within the LGBTQ+ community.

== See also ==
- Vodka tonic
- Vodka cocktail
- List of cocktails § Vodka

== Notes ==
Ready-to-drink vodka sodas poured over ice in wine glasses.
