= Rio (Chinese drink) =

Chinese ready to drink alcopop beverage brand

- Type: Alcopop
- Manufacturer: Shanghai Bacchus Limited Company
- Origin: China
- Introduced: 2003
- Website: www.riowine.com

Rio (Chinese: RIO锐澳鸡尾酒) is a Chinese ready to drink alcopop beverage brand conceived in 2003 and manufactured by Shanghai Bacchus Limited Company, an arm of Shanghai Bairun Investment Holding Group Co., Ltd. (Chinese: 百润股份, SZSE: 002568). Rio is a member of the China Alcoholic Drinks Association, and was inducted in 2010. Along with Breezer, Rio is one of the largest alcopop producers in China where both the brands share a combined two-thirds of the alcopop market in China. Rio generated revenue of 365 million yuan (US$59 million) in the first half of 2014. In 2016, Bacchus reached a partnership with Veolia Water Technologies China.

== Background and naming ==
The founder of Rio was present at a wine tasting event in Singapore. However, in the 1990s, most alcohol brands used only single wine-based ingredients. He was puzzled by the few types of juices that could form a good taste with alcohol. He then studied chuhai cocktails in Japan to suit the tastebuds of Asians before launching the product in 2003. Unlike its Japanese counterparts, Rio was sold in glass bottles instead of aluminium cans as the founder believed that cocktails are better received by consumers when packaged in glass. The brand was given the name Rio to evoke the tropical feel of Brazil's Rio de Janeiro.

== Marketing ==
Rio is the title sponsor for multiple Chinese dramas, movies and variety shows. Rio's products are endorsed in the shows, which include drama Boss & Me, Love O2O, top variety show Keep Running and many more. Yang Yang and Amber Kuo are currently the spokespersons for Rio, succeeding Zhou Xun.

== Lawsuit ==
In 2017, Bacchus filed an action with the Beijing Dongcheng District People's Court against Tonghua Dongte Wine Co., Ltd. for unfair competition in which the former claims of Dongte's "BIO" series has infringed its "RIO" series' appearance and packaging. The court hearing rendered Bacchus with compensations of RMB 3 million in damages.
