= High Noon (seltzer) =

American alcoholic beverage brand

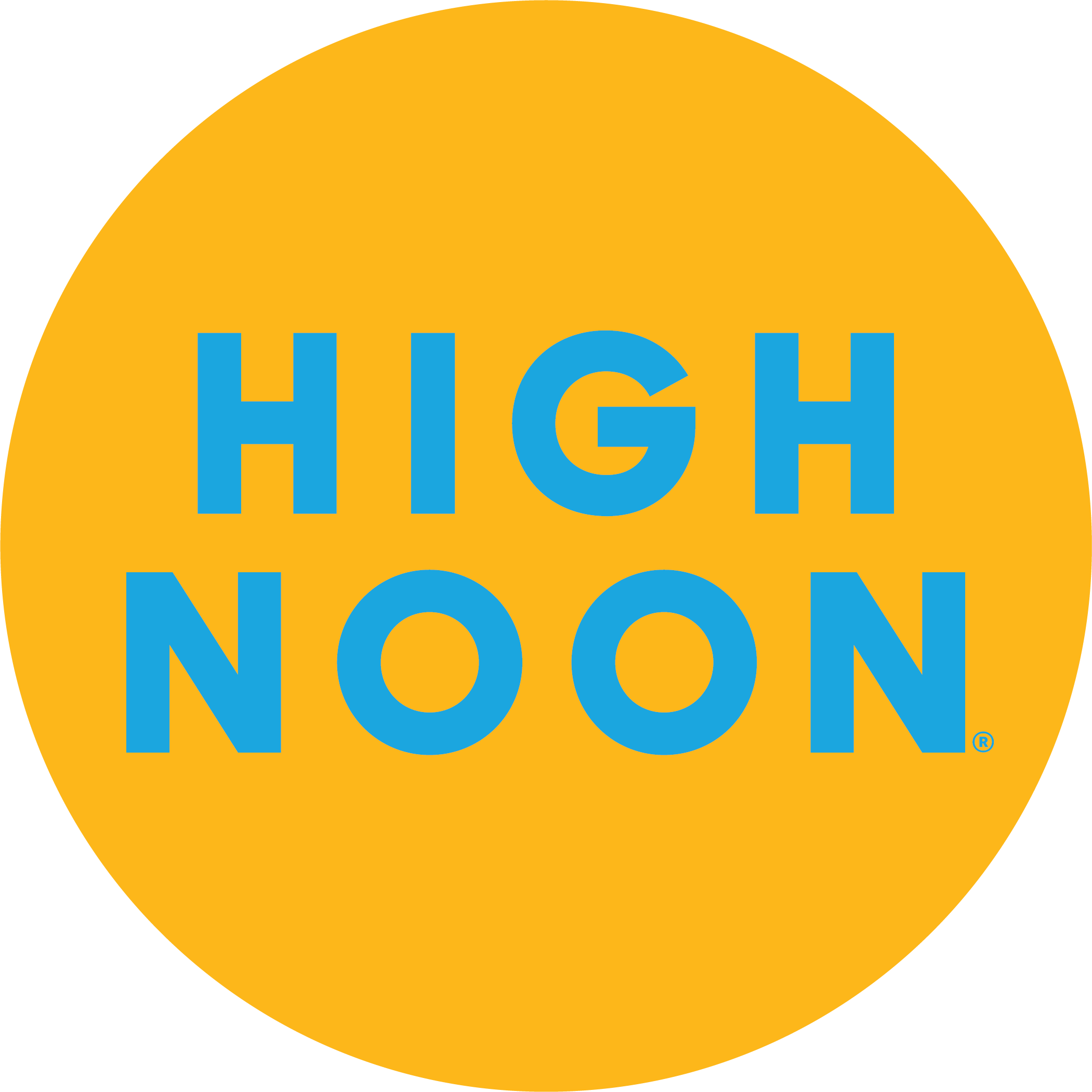

- Type: Alcoholic beverage
- Manufacturer: E & J Gallo Winery
- Origin: United States
- Introduced: 2019; 7 years ago
- Alcohol by volume: 4.5%
- Style: Hard seltzer
- Ingredients: Vodka; fruit juice
- Website: highnoonspirits.com

High Noon is an American alcoholic beverage brand specializing in hard seltzer made with vodka and fruit juice. Introduced in 2019 by American wine and spirits company E & J Gallo Winery, High Noon is the top-selling spirit brand by volume in the United States as of 2023.

== History ==
E & J Gallo Winery initially conceptualized of High Noon as a new brand of 80-proof vodka made with corn sourced from the Midwestern United States, as an offshoot of the company's existing brand New Amsterdam. After a year of testing the High Noon vodka product, the company decided to package the vodka with fruit juice in the form of a 4.5% ABV ready-to-drink canned hard seltzer, differentiating itself from competing hard seltzer brands that use fermented cane sugar or malted barley instead of vodka.

E & J Gallo launched High Noon hard seltzer in 2019, with original flavors including grapefruit, pineapple, black cherry, and watermelon. In its first year on the market, High Noon sold 600,000 cases, far surpassing the company's predicted sales. By 2021, the available set of High Noon flavors expanded to include lime, peach, passionfruit, and mango. In 2022, High Noon launched the High Noon Pool Pack, including new flavors guava and kiwi.

In March 2023, High Noon introduced a line of tequila-based seltzers, with flavors including lime, grapefruit, passionfruit, and strawberry. Regarding the brand's expansion into tequila, E & J Gallo general manager of spirits Britt West said, "With the fast-growing rise of tequila, it seemed like a natural fit for High Noon considering we pioneered putting real spirits into seltzer, so tequila was a natural extension of that."

In May 2024, the brand launched High Noon Vodka Iced Tea, a line of non-carbonated hard iced tea drinks in original, peach, lemon, and raspberry flavors. West said that "hard tea was one of consumers’ most frequent ready-to-drink category purchased in 2023, which created an opportunity for High Noon to provide a premium alternative in a way only the brand can with real vodka and real iced tea."

In May 2025, High Noon came out with ''Lucky One Lemonade,'' a line of vodka-based canned lemonade. The non-carbonated vodka-lemonades come in four fruit flavors: Original, Peach, Blueberry, and Raspberry. Brandon Lieb, vice-president at Spirit of Gallo, said: “Hard lemonade is having a moment – and we saw an opportunity to bring something new to the table." High Noon partnered with ''Miss Peaches,'' the rescue pitbull owned by Dave Portnoy, with Miss Peaches' image appearing on every can. The partnership seeks to support dog rescue organizations, and Miss Peaches has pledges to raise 1 Million Dollars for the cause. The brand has partnered with Lifeline Animal Project and Best Friends Animal Society as part of their ‘Our Pack Gives Back’ initiative, running through September 1, 2025.

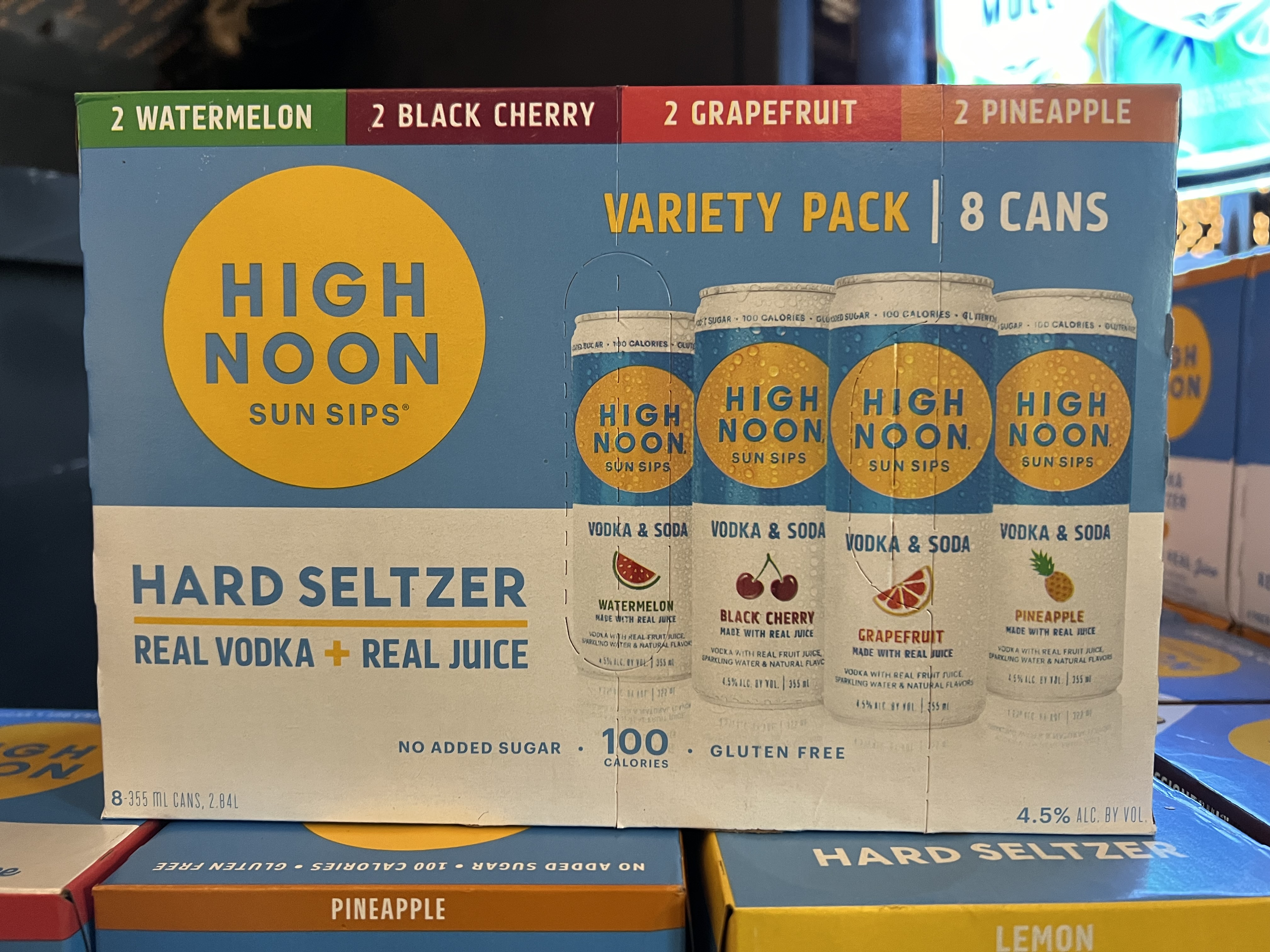
Variety pack of High Noon hard seltzers: Watermelon, Black cherry, Grapefruit, and Pineapple

In July 2025, High Noon issued a recall of its Beach Variety vodka seltzer pack after cans in eight U.S. states were mislabeled as Celsius Astro Vibe sparkling blue razz, a nonalcoholic energy drink. Gallo attributed the mislabeling to "a labeling error from our can supplier," warning of unintentional alcohol consumption but reporting "no illnesses or adverse events" stemming from the incident.

== Marketing ==
High Noon has partnered with sports media company Barstool Sports since May 2020, being integrated across several of Barstool's sports programs and being personally endorsed by Barstool founder Dave Portnoy. It was the flagship sponsor of Barstool trivia show The Dozen: Trivia Tournament Championships.

== Reception ==
High Noon has received praise for its fresh taste and use of natural ingredients. The Tasting Panel Magazine named High Noon the Best Tasting Seltzer in 2020 and 2021. In 2023, Taste of Home named High Noon the best hard seltzer, noting its "great fruit flavor that quickly dissipated to a nice, clean seltzer finish." Delish wrote that "each High Noon actually tasted like the flavor listed on the label," while noting that "because of the real juice, the sugar content is a little higher than many other seltzers on the market."

In a review for USA Today, Christian D'Andrea wrote that "High Noon's tequila seltzers (mostly) live up to the brand's lofty reputation," calling the lime flavor a "great canned cocktail from a brand that leads the pack among the macro-brewers in its field." Jenn Carnevale of The Daily Meal called High Noon Vodka Iced Tea "a really great selection of hard iced teas, all featuring their own unique flavor profiles," especially praising the original flavor.

== See also ==
- Truly (brand)
- White Claw Hard Seltzer
