= Small Town Brewery =

Brewing company in Wauconda, Illinois, US

- Industry: Alcoholic beverage
- Founded: 2010; 16 years ago
- Founder: Tim Kovac
- Headquarters: Wauconda, Illinois, US
- Products: Beer
- Website: smalltownbrewery.com

Small Town Brewery was a brewing company based in Wauconda, Illinois, best known for creating the Not Your Father's brand of flavored beers.

== History ==
Small Town Brewery was founded by John Dopak and Tim Kovac in Wauconda in 2010. Kovac first started homebrewing in 1988. After three years of development, Not Your Father's Root Beer was released in Illinois in 2012. It was initially sold in its 19.5% abv incarnation in kegs at local bars and liquor stores. The brewery then did two small bottling runs of a 10.7% abv root beer in 22-ounce bottles, and in November 2014, they released 12-ounce bottles of a 5.9% abv version.

In March 2015, Small Town partnered with Pabst Brewing Company to distribute the Not Your Father's brand nationally. Shortly thereafter, Pabst owners, including Pabst CEO Eugene Kashper, acquired a stake in the brand and the company. A new category in the alcoholic beverage industry was created due to the success of Not Your Father's Root Beer, referred to as "hard soda" or "flavored beer."

The Small Town Brewery tap room in Wauconda opened on October 15, 2015. It served a rotating cycle of 16 Small Town beers, with flavors including French Toast, Bourbon Pecan and Strawberry Rhubarb.

The company ceased operations in 2019. Kovac opened a new taproom later that year in Cary under the name Spirit Water.

== Products ==
Not Your Father's Root Beer is a traditionally-made beer brewed with botanicals, spices, and herbs such as wintergreen, sarsaparilla bark, anise, cinnamon, nutmeg, vanilla bean and honey, to give it the taste of an old-fashioned root beer. It is currently available nationally in two abv levels: 5.9% and 10.7%. Not Your Father's Root Beer 5.9% abv 6-pack bottles was the best-selling craft beer in the United States in 2015.

Not Your Father's Ginger Ale was released in November 2015. Not Your Father's Vanilla Cream Ale, at 4.1% abv, was made available in 2016. However, the only products currently sold in the Not Your Father's line are Root Beer and Lemonade.

== Reception ==
Not Your Father's Root Beer was awarded Second Place in BeerHoptacular Beer of the Year, in 2013 Beer Advocate rates the Not Your Father's Root Beer 10.7% variant as 94 out of 100.

Michael Agnew, owner of A Perfect Pint, after visiting the brewery, argued that the equipment he saw could not produce such a high alcohol content product and suggested the root beer contained added neutral grain spirit. Strange Brews host Andrew Gill speculated that perhaps it was not beer but rather a flavored malt beverage. Additionally, a Chicago Tribune article questioned the brewery's statement that no sugar is added to the beverage and that its sweetness comes solely from grains and spices.
