= Borg (drink) =

Mixed drink made in a gallon jug

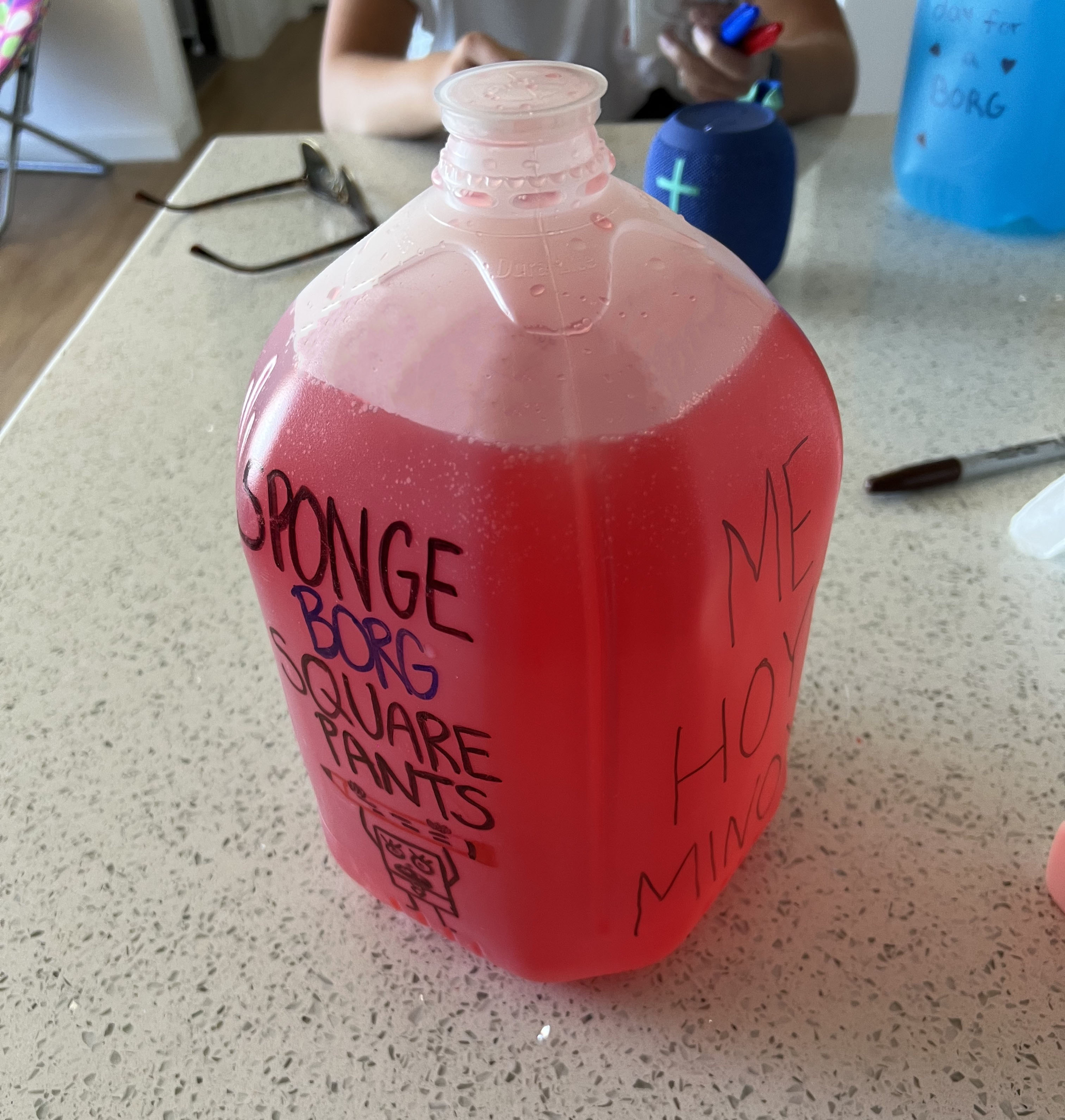
- Red borg labeled "SpongeBorg SquarePants"
- Type: Mixed drink
- Ingredients: Half-gallon of water; Fifth of vodka; Flavored drink mix such as MiO, Kool-Aid, or Crystal Light; Electrolyte mix such as Pedialyte or Liquid I.V.
- Standard drinkware: Plastic gallon water jug

A borg (sometimes BORG, short for blackout rage gallon) is a mixed drink made in a plastic gallon jug, generally containing water, vodka, flavored drink mix such as MiO or Kool-Aid, and sometimes electrolyte mix such as Pedialyte. The drink gained popularity at universities in the United States in the early 2020s, spreading among members of Generation Z on TikTok in late 2022 and early 2023. A borg is designed to be held and consumed by one individual throughout a party, distinguishing it from older communally-served party drinks (which may have similar ingredients) such as jungle juice and punch. Drinkers typically label their borg jug with a nickname, often a pun on the word "borg."

A borg's high alcohol content and convenient packaging facilitates binge drinking, with a typical recipe calling for a fifth of vodka, equivalent to about 16 drinks. The drink has been touted as a hangover remedy and a harm reduction strategy, supposedly counteracting the effects of alcohol with water and electrolytes, but these claims are not grounded in scientific evidence.

Officials blamed borg consumption for a mass hospitalization event at the University of Massachusetts Amherst in March 2023.

== History ==
Borgs gained popularity during parties at state universities in the United States as early as 2018, especially at large outdoor daytime parties, or "darties". The drink's popularity grew throughout the following few years, largely due to video trends on TikTok in which drinkers shared recipes and punny nicknames for their borgs. The COVID-19 pandemic may have also contributed to the popularity of the drink, as it is typically consumed by one person and not shared, reducing the risk of germ transmission.

== Claimed benefits ==
One common claim is that the drink's high water content and inclusion of electrolytes may reduce the risks of binge drinking, including dehydration, alcohol intoxication, and hangovers. Borgs are typically made by the drinker, giving them more control over the contents. Other proposed benefits of borgs include their flavor additives masking the taste of alcohol, their translucent jugs allowing drinkers to see how much they have consumed and pace themselves, and their sealed containers allowing drinkers to circumvent open-container laws as well as reducing the risk of drug-facilitated sexual assault.

== Risks ==
Medical experts have rejected the borg's claimed benefits, instead blaming the drink for promoting binge drinking. Many experts have warned that a borg's typical fifth of vodka, equivalent to roughly 16 shots, is dangerous for one person to consume, even when mixed with other ingredients or spread out over a full day. Some borg flavoring powder, such as MiO, also contains caffeine, which experts have noted can have dangerous effects when mixed with alcohol. The National Capital Poison Center links borg consumption to increased risks for alcohol poisoning, cancer, and other chronic diseases.

Boston University health law professor David Jernigan noted that the borg does not "meaningfully reduce the risks of drinking," including alcoholic liver disease. Gus Colangelo, an Emergency Medicine Physician at Tufts Medical Center, asserted borgs are even more dangerous than traditional alcoholic beverages, calling them a method of "uncontrolled drinking." Stanford University psychiatry and addiction medicine professor Anna Lembke said that drinking a borg "can lead to potentially life-threatening consumption and alcohol poisoning", as the drink's alcohol quantity "totally overwhelms the capacity of the liver to metabolize it".

The risks of borgs drew national attention after March 4, 2023, when 46 students at the University of Massachusetts Amherst were hospitalized after consuming borgs during an annual Saint Patrick's Day celebration called the Blarney Blowout. Patients were transported to the hospital in 32 ambulances, a record in the history of the annual event. They were treated for a variety of alcohol-related issues including alcohol intoxication, but all were discharged without life-threatening injuries. In a statement, university officials said this was their first observation of notable borg usage and warned students about the risks of binge drinking.

== In popular culture ==
The 2024 Broadway adaptation of William Shakespeare's Romeo and Juliet, directed by Sam Gold, prominently featured a borg as a prop, held by Lord and Lady Capulet (portrayed by Sola Fadiran) throughout the play and used by Romeo (Kit Connor) to ingest the poison pill at the play's climax. Described by Today as "Chekhov's borg", the jug was labeled with various Shakespearean puns at each performance, including "to borg or not to borg" and "William Shakesborg".

== See also ==
- Jungle juice
- Punch (drink)
- Nutcracker
