= Blue wine =

Variety of wine

Blue wine is fermented from a combination of red grapes and white grapes, with pigments and sweeteners added. Producers of blue wine claim that the production process only incorporates raw material derived from plants. However, researchers have found that the blue color in some blue wines comes from synthetic food coloring. Blue wine's mild, sweet taste makes it best suited to the role of an aperitif or cocktail when dining. Blue wine is named for its electric blue color. Its creators were inspired by the marketing theory in Blue Ocean Strategy.

== History ==
The first blue wine in the world was produced by a Spanish company called Gïk in 2016. This wine is now sold in 25 countries around the world.

They worked with chemical engineering researchers at University of the Basque Country to develop a product with a distinctive color while maintaining taste. They targeted customers unfamiliar with traditional wine manufacture with their unconventional product. Gïk's creators marketed their product as innovatively shaking up the traditional wine industry, and maintained this image with stunts like suggesting alt music playlists as pairings on the label.

== Brewing ==
According to its producers Gïk and Vindigo, blue wine is made as follows:

1. Combine the different kinds of red grapes and white grapes.
2. Add natural pigments (anthocyanin and indigotine) for color.
3. Add non-caloric and sugar-free sweeteners.

However, this description of the steps is incomplete, as it does not state when the artificial blue colorant is added.

== Synthetic dye ==
Researchers at Paul Sabatier University found via high-precision spectroscopy that the color of Vindigo and Imajyne blue wine originates not from any natural pigment but rather from brilliant blue FCF (aka Blue 1 or E133), the same food coloring used for Blue Curaçao, blue Jolly Ranchers, and many other products.

== Wine tasting ==
Blue wine tastes like a fruit wine due to its mellowness and sweetness. Some people find it tastes of syrup but fail to detect the sweetener in the wine. Food & Wine reviewers, however, disliked its artificial sweetness, comparing it to blue Equal packets at a café. It has a lower alcohol content than most wine. Cosmopolitan reviewers compared it to blue Jolly Ranchers, diluted wine mixed with Kool-Aid, and "jungle juice", but some thought it might be good in mixed drinks. It has a fruit fragrance. Gïk blue wine says on the label that it is best paired with foods like Carbonara. Others prefer it chilled and paired with seafood.

René Le Bail, creator of Vindigo blue wine, described the taste as a combination of fruits, including many various berries and passion fruit.

== Society and culture ==
Sushi Artist Madrid was one of the first restaurants to sell blue wine in Spain, and found it to be more popular with some of their customers than expected.

Some customers, especially in France, Spain and other western countries, dislike blue wine, because its production methods, taste, and other qualities violate their countries' winemaking traditions. Additionally, many people still assert that only curaçao should be marketed as the blue alcoholic beverage. To some, blue wine should not be regarded as wine due to its low alcohol content and sweetener, regarding it as a beverage with mild and sweet fruit taste.

Chad Walsh, a sommelier, claims that the main trend of wine is still towards natural and traditional products, which blue wine is not. This trend explains why it is hard to find blue wine on a formal wine list; blue wine is more likely to appear at parties, casual bars, and other informal occasions. It is also sold in retail stores and online.

== Development ==
In 2016, Gïk became the first company to sell blue wine. The European Union ruled that this product could not be labeled as wine. In order to continue to sell its product, Gïk ceased labeling it as wine in the EU.

Vindigo, a French company founded by René Le Bail, also produces blue wine. It launched in the south of France in August, 2018, and was more successful in that region than Gïk. Despite French customers' interest in buying blue wine, no French vineyards would work with Vindigo, forcing it to be produced in Spain. Vindigo uses Chardonnay grapes. Vindigo has had its greatest successes in countries such as Italy and China.
