= Hard soda =

Alcoholic beverage

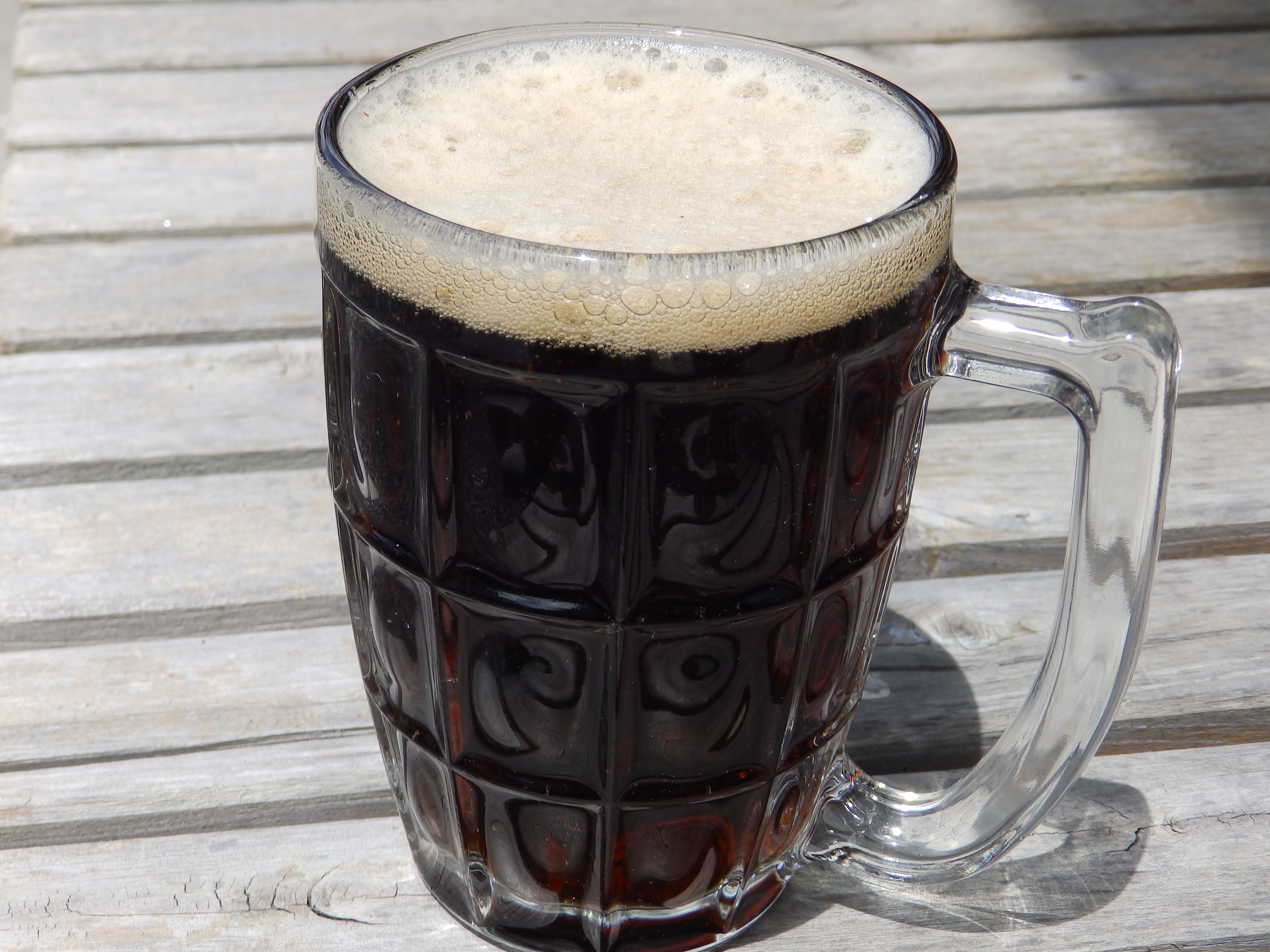
The first hard soda was modeled after the beverage pictured here, root beer. According to Not Your Father's Root Beer, it is an ale that contains sarsaparilla, wintergreen, anise and vanilla.

Hard soda, also referred to as flavored beer, adult soda, fermented soda, mature soda and alcohol soda, is a type of alcoholic beverage and craft beer that is manufactured in the style of a soft drink. It has gained recent prominence in the United States after the success of the Not Your Father's Root Beer brand manufactured by Small Town Brewery. As of late May 2016, at least 39 hard soda brands existed in the United States.

== Overview ==
=== United States ===
Hard soda is a relatively new category in the craft beer segment of the alcoholic beverage industry that gained prominence in the United States after the success of the Not Your Father's Root Beer brand manufactured by Small Town Brewery based in Wauconda, Illinois. A partnership between Small Town Brewery and Pabst Brewing Company led to a significant increase in sales, whereby distribution of the product in the U.S. was expanded and then later expanded to be nationwide in June 2015. Small Town Brewery first began brewing the product in 2012, and it has a 5.9% alcohol by volume content. The company released a Hard Ginger Ale in September 2015, and has plans to market a Vanilla Cream Ale hard soda. The company also plans on marketing a separate version of the Not Your Father's Root Beer brand with a higher alcohol content. In January 2016, the Not Your Father's Root Beer brand was the market leader in the hard soda category.

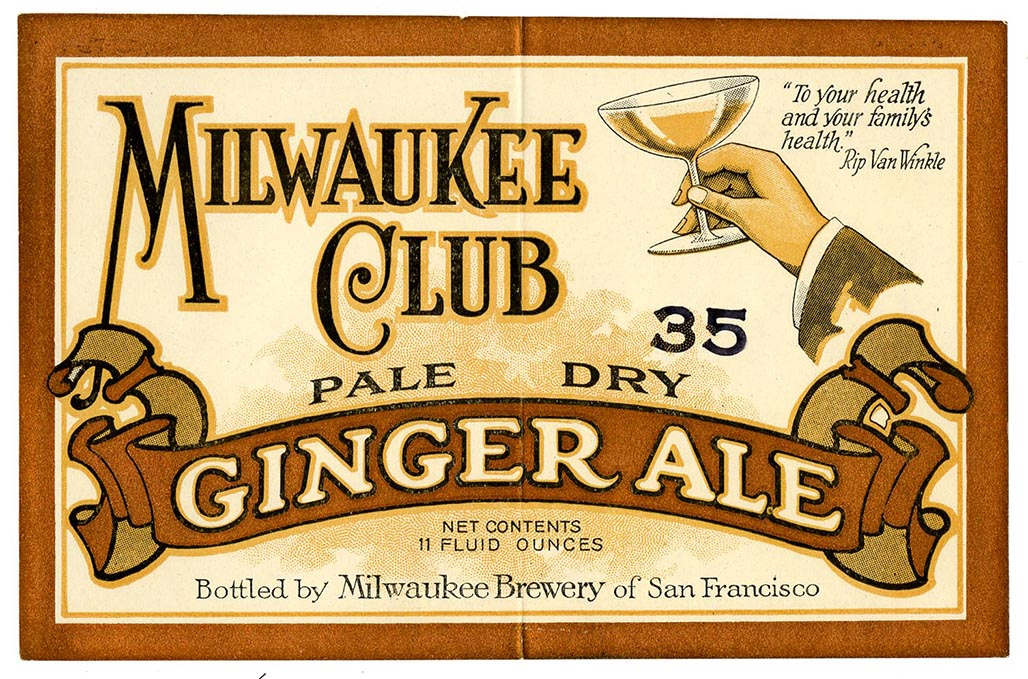
Ginger ale is another popular flavor chosen for hard soda formulations. As seen in this photo, the history of ginger ale's relationship with breweries is quite old. Milwaukee Club pale dry ginger ale, The Milwaukee Brewery of San Francisco, 1895-1935

As of late May 2016, the hard soda category comprises over 1 percent of total overall beer category sales in the United States. In the U.S., many new hard soda brands have emerged beginning around early December 2015 and numbered to at least 39 brands by late May 2016. One of them is the Best Damn Root Beer brand manufactured by Anheuser-Busch InBev's Best Damn Brewing Co., which was the second best-selling brand in May 2016 after Not Your Father's Root Beer, which realized double the overall sales compared to that of Best Damn Root Beer circa this time period. Anheuser-Busch InBev also produces the Best Damn Cherry Cola brand product. The Henry's Hard Soda brand ginger ale and orange soda are produced by MillerCoors, and brands produced by the Boston Beer Company include Hard Ginger Ale, Hard Orange Cream ale and Coney Island Brewing Hard Root Beer. The Boston Beer Company root beer brand began development by the company's Alchemy & Science branch in 2013. Diageo produces the Captain Morgan Spiked Root Beer brand, which is packaged in tall cans, and the Molson Coors Brewing Company produces the Mad Jack Premium Hard Root Beer brand.

=== Canada ===
In Canada, the Mill Street Brewery in Toronto, which is owned by Labatt Breweries, produces a hard root beer using its house-made root beer mixed with its vanilla porter bierschnaps. As of June 2016, the product was only available in Ontario. Crazy Uncle Hard Root Beer is a hard root beer brand produced by the Brand Fusion company in Toronto, Canada. It is packaged in cans. Crazy Beard Apple Ale is produced by the Dusty Boots company in Canada, and is a mixture of beer and cider.

== Low and non-alcohol flavored beer ==
In Indonesia, Multi Bintang produces a non/low alcohol flavored beer named Bintang Radler, which is produced in grapefruit and lemon flavors. The grapefruit flavor was introduced in 2015 and the lemon flavor was introduced in February 2016.

== Uses ==
In addition to being drunk as-is, hard soda root beer products are sometimes used as an ingredient in the root beer float.

== See also ==
- Alcopop – Flavored beverage with relatively low alcohol content
- Chuhai – Alcoholic drink from Japan
- Dirty soda – Soft drink mixture
- Fassbrause – German fruit beer
- Hard cider – Fermented alcoholic beverage from apple juice
- Hard seltzer – Carbonated alcoholic beverage
- Mike's Hard Lemonade Co. – American flavored malt beverage company
- Queen Mary (cocktail) – Blend of beer, grenadine & maraschino cherries
- Shandy – Beer or cider mixed with lemonade
