= Briggs Original =

Brigg's Original
- Company type: Private
- Industry: Hard seltzer
- Founder: Neil Quigley and Michael Kurson

Briggs Original is a hard seltzer company headquartered in Somerville, Massachusetts.

== History ==
The company was established in 2015 by Neil Quigley and Michael Kurson, who had been friends since kindergarten. Quigley received a diploma in brewing at Brewlab and became Farmer Willie's Alcoholic Ginger Beer prior to founding Brigg's. Quigley and Kurson's first product was Boston Cranberry hard seltzer. Quigley and Kurson brewed test batches of the seltzer in five-gallon jugs in their garage while they were developing it. In 2018, they added pineapple and grapefruit flavored seltzers.
