= Two Dogs =

Australian alcopop beverage

Two Dogs Lemon Brew
- Two Dogs logo
- Type: Alcopop
- Manufacturer: Two Dogs
- Origin: Australia
- Introduced: 1993

Two Dogs was a ready-to-drink beverage that was first introduced in Australia in 1993 and went on to become available throughout the world. It was a lemon flavoured alcoholic beverage that is widely considered to have been the "world’s first brewed alcoholic lemonade" (despite the pre-existence of traditional drinks like sima), paving the way for similar products such as Hooper's Hooch and Mike's Hard Lemonade.

Two Dogs was created in 1993 by the South Australian brewer Duncan MacGillivray. The tale behind the drink says that MacGillivray, an owner of a small brewery and pub in South Australia, was having a beer with some friends who owned a lemon farm. They mentioned that they didn't know what to do with all their lemons that they couldn't sell due to size. Duncan said "I'll try brewing them." He soon had a truck of lemons on his hands and went to work brewing them. The result was a drink that started selling pretty well. Now Duncan was faced with marketing and selling the beer and had to come up with a name. All he could think of was the punch line to a joke he had heard. Thus Two Dogs brewing company was born. There was a "Why Do You Ask?" on the bottle. This was also part of the joke.

The product was acquired by the French alcoholic beverage company Pernod Ricard in 1995, who owned the brand until 2006, when it was sold to the Kirin Brewery Company of Japan.

Two Dogs was brought to the United Kingdom in 1995, where the rights to manufacture and distribute the product were originally owned by the cider maker Merrydown, but the distribution rights were sold to Scottish Courage in 1997.

== See also ==
- Alcopop
- Hooper's Hooch
- Mike's Hard Lemonade
