= Jungle juice =

Alcoholic drink created for sharing

Jungle juice is an improvised mix of liquor that is usually served for group consumption. The term has also been used for similar less-than-reputable alcoholic concoctions. It is also termed trash can punch due to often being served in improvised large containers such as household trash cans.

== History ==
"Jungle juice" as a term for bootlegged alcoholic drinks was used as early as 1909 in both the city of Fort Collins, Colorado and the town of Fort Gibson, Oklahoma. The item in the Weekly Courier in Fort Collins in February 1909 said the editor of a paper in nearby Eaton found Fort Collins "Jungle juice is too fierce for him."

The term appeared in Fort Collins newspapers several times over the next two decades. The name came from an area known as "the Jungle" on the outskirts of the dry town that was home to bootlegging and other illicit activities. A 1925 column in the Fort Collins Independent referred to "jungle juice" as the "acid that made Fort Collins famous."

Other uses of the term for bootlegged or homemade alcoholic drinks appeared in U.S. and Canadian newspapers in the 1930s and the first two years of the 1940s (before the U.S. entered World War II).

Australian newspapers used the term before the war to refer to home-brewed auto fuel additives. (Some of the Fort Collins articles also referred to their "jungle juice" being used this way.)

The term gained more widespread use during the war, first among Australian and American troops in New Guinea beginning in late 1942 and early 1943. Some newspaper articles described how it was made and what effect it had on those who drank it.

Recipe for famed jungle juice cocktail: Break open top of a coconut, add sugar and raisins, replace top, set in sun three weeks and hold on to your hat.

The subject of liquor on this island is very low. The only thing they have is some kind of stuff which is called 'jungle juice.' I have not had any but from the reports two smells of the cork and you pass out.

Some of the boys make their own brew, commonly known as Jungle juice. Its' [sic] a mixture of coconut juice, paw-paw juice and a handful of raisins (that is if they ever get a parcel from home with raisins in it) and various other tropical fruit juices, too numerous to name. Let it stand for three days until even the flies shun it, then it is declared okay. And is it potent? I tried it once but never again and I thought I could drink.

== Sedative ==
The term had also been applied to a specific treatment for war neurosis being practiced during the Second World War. Dr. William Sargant began to treat afflicted soldiers with large doses of a sedative called sodium amytal. The sedative would induce a deep sleep lasting up to three weeks. Patients would only be woken for an hour each day to be fed and to be bathed. The idea behind this sleep narcosis treatment was to break the cycle of exhaustion and anxiety caused by combat stress reaction. Additionally, insulin was given to patients to help restore lost weight due to inactivity. The insulin, however, could induce a coma by lowering the blood sugar. If the blood sugar level dropped too low, it could result in irreversible brain damage or even death. Soldiers began to refer to the sedative treatment as being given "Jungle Juice".

== See also ==
- Alcopop
- Borg (drink)
- Hard seltzer
- Jello shot
- Lean (drug)
- List of juices
- Nutcracker (drink)
- Punch (drink)
- Queen Mary (beer cocktail)
- Zombie (cocktail)
