= Vodka tonic =

Type of cocktail

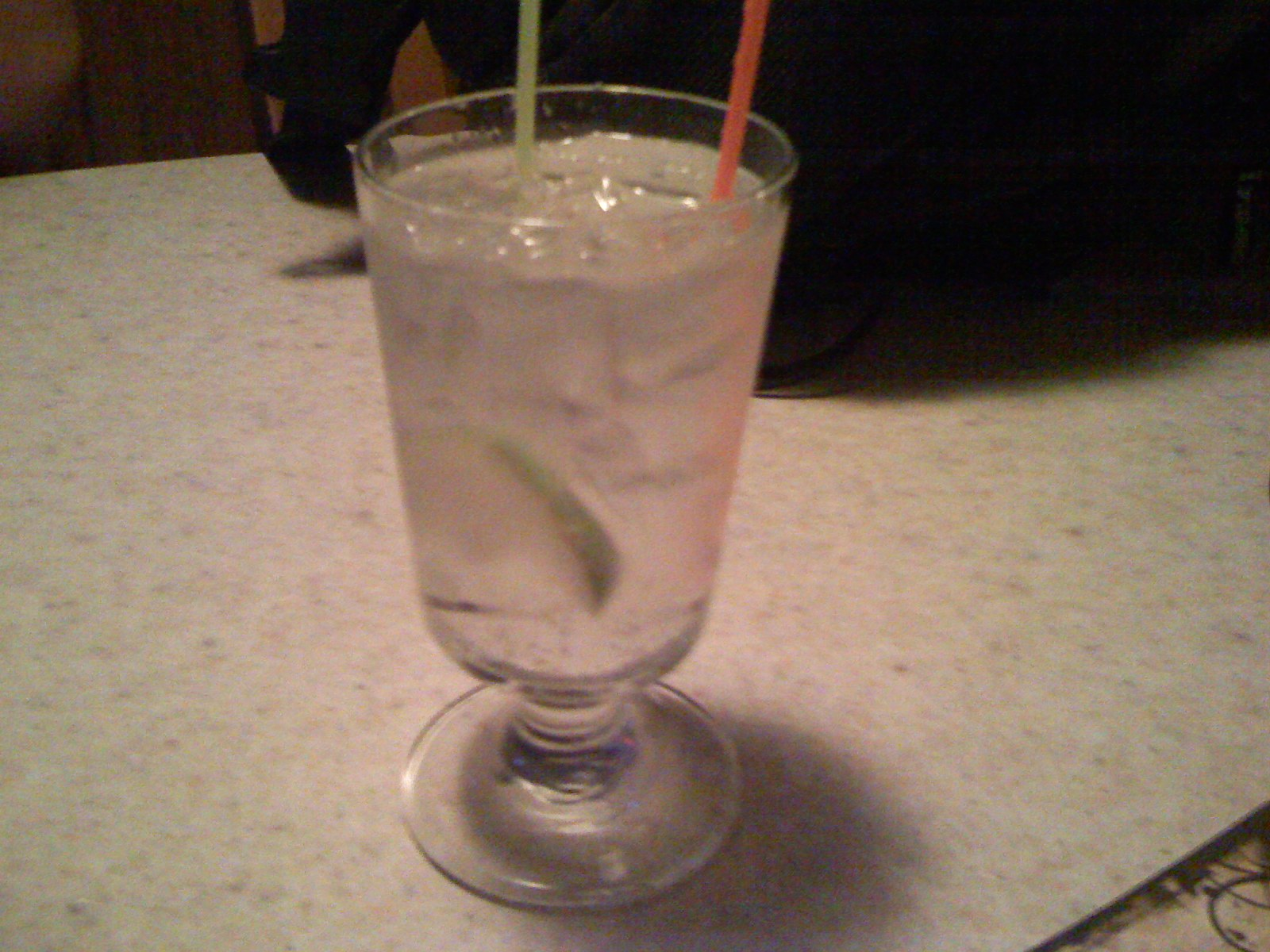
- Type: Cocktail
- Ingredients: One part vodka; One to three parts tonic water, to taste; Often lemon or lime juice fresh-squeezed from a wedge of fruit
- Base spirit: Vodka
- Standard drinkware: Highball glass
- Standard garnish: citrus fruit, usually lime or lemon
- Served: On the rocks: poured over ice
- Preparation: Mix and serve-stirred, not shaken.

A vodka tonic is a long drink made with varying proportions of vodka and tonic water. Vodka tonics are frequently garnished with a slice of lime or lemon.

One commonly used recipe is one part vodka and one part tonic water in a tumbler, often a highball glass over ice, with a generous lime wedge squeezed into it.

The drink is referenced in the lyrics of the song "Goodbye Yellow Brick Road" by Elton John.

The drink is referenced in the book From Russia with Love by Ian Fleming. In chapter 17, second paragraph Bond sips a vodka and tonic whilst watching the sunset over the Golden Horn in Istanbul.

== See also ==
- Vodka soda
- Gin and tonic
