= Burple =

Drink mix

Burple is a discontinued drink mix that was packaged in an expandable accordion-like plastic container. There were two sizes of Burple available, a lunchbox-size (8 oz, 240 mL) and a full-size (64 oz, 1890 mL) container. It was distributed by Sundale Beverages of Belmont, California and sold mainly in the Midwest.

== Flavors ==
The drink was often compared to Kool-Aid and came in the flavors grape, strawberry, cherry, peach, and orange.

== Packaging ==
The accordion-like bottle was one of its most distinctive features. To prepare the drink, the container was stretched to expand it to its full size and water was added to the concentrated liquid in the bottle. The bottle would then contract again as you drank from it.

The label included instructions for poking a hole in the cap to convert the container into an ad hoc squirt gun after finishing the drink. Popular Photography magazine recommended that the bottles could also be used for darkroom chemicals. Packaging magazine reported children finding many other uses for the bottle.
