= Garage (drink) =

Finnish alcopop drink

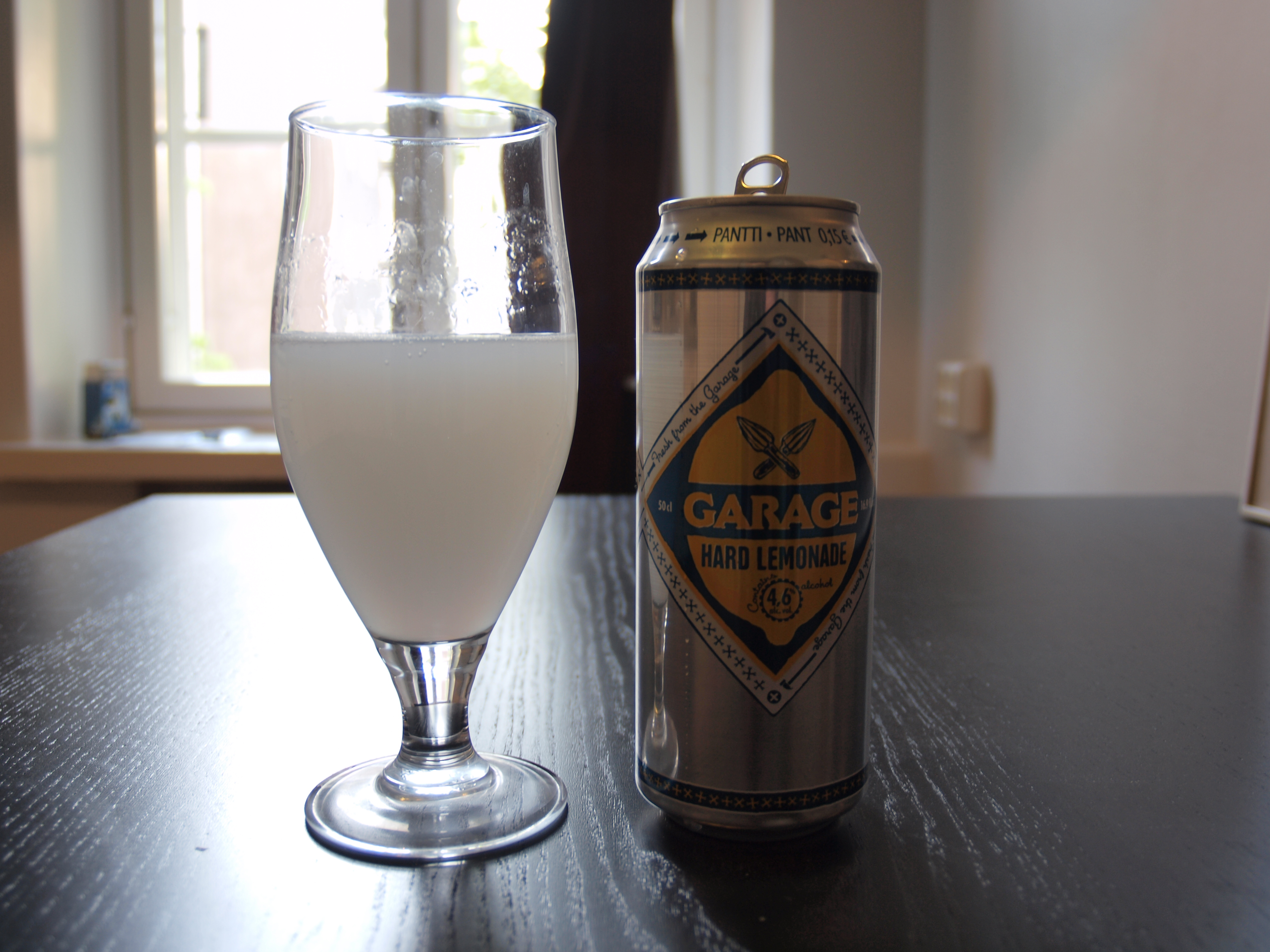
A can of Garage Hard Lemonade poured into a glass.

Garage is an alcopop produced by the Finnish brewery Sinebrychoff. As of 2025, it is produced and marketed in five flavours, Lemonade, passionfruit, pineapple, lime and cherry. The flavours have an alcohol content ranging from 4.0% to 6.0%. Garage is currently sold at least in the United States, Russia, Georgia, Kazakhstan, Estonia, Denmark, Sweden, Ukraine, Belarus, Latvia, Lithuania, Hungary, Canada, Bulgaria, Poland, Slovakia, Estonia and Finland. Garage has had good progress in the global market, as an example in 2013 its sales in Finland grew by 30%.
