= VK (drink) =

Alcopop brand

- Type: Alcopop
- Manufacturer: Global Brands
- Origin: United Kingdom
- Introduced: 1997
- Alcohol by volume: 3.4%
- Website: vkofficial.com

VK is a brand of alcopop produced by Global Brands. It is sold and marketed in the United Kingdom. Morning Advertiser ranked it as the second most popular UK ready to drink in 2022, after WKD.

== Product information ==
VK contains 3.4% alcohol by volume (ABV). The drink was launched in 1997 in Chesterfield, Derbyshire, England.

== Varieties ==
As of 2023:

No.	Name	Information
1	VK Blue	Mixed fruit flavour
2	VK Raspberry & Peach	Raspberry and peach flavour, now discontinued
3	VK Strawberry & Lime	Strawberry and lime flavour
4	VK Black Cherry	Cherry flavour
5	VK Apple & Mango	Apple and mango flavour
6	VK Tropical Fruits	Tropical fruits flavour
7	VK Orange & Passionfruit	Orange and passionfruit flavour
8	VK Watermelon	Watermelon flavour
9	VK Pineapple & Grapefruit	Pineapple and grapefruit flavour, low calories and low alcohol
10	VK Pear	Pear flavour, now discontinued
11	VK Ice	Iced lemon flavour
12	VK Candy Cane	Strawberry and peppermint seasonal edition flavour
13	VK & Soda Berries	Lower alcohol and sugar VK, Berry flavour, now discontinued
14	VK & Soda Lime	Lower alcohol and sugar VK, Lime flavour, now discontinued
15	VK Chocolate Orange	Chocolate and orange seasonal edition flavour
16	VK Zero 0.0%	Mixed fruit flavour, alcohol free 0%
17	VK Apple & Blackcurrant	Apple and Blackcurrant flavour
18	VK Lemon & Lime	Lemon & Lime flavour
