= Nutcracker (drink) =

Illicit alcoholic drinks sold in New York City

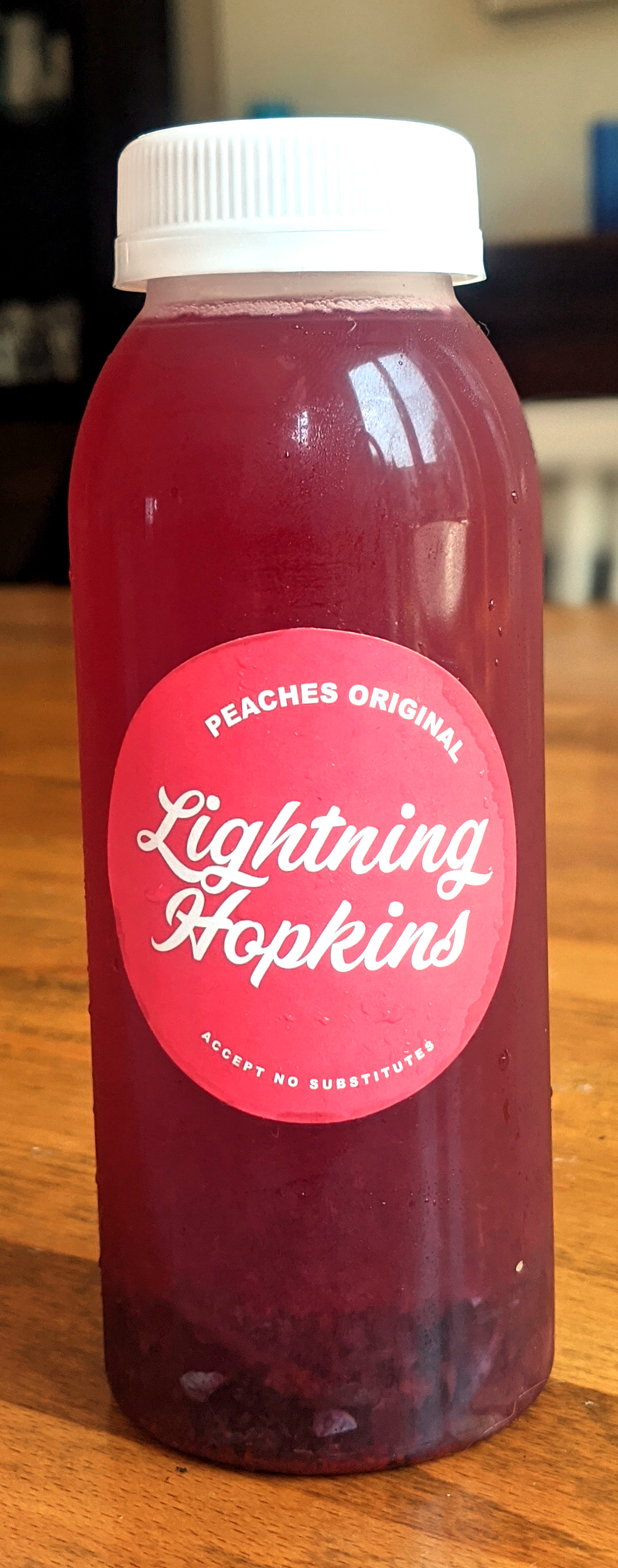
Nutcrackers are traditionally sold in juice bottles; more recently, legal to-go cocktails are sold in the same format.

A nutcracker is a type of cocktail consisting of a mixture of hard liquor and sugary beverages such as fruit juice. Nutcrackers originated and are typically made and sold in New York City. Originally sold via word-of-mouth by street vendors, nutcrackers have also been offered as "to-go cocktails" by establishments such as bars and restaurants.

Nutcrackers frequently consist of liquors such as vodka, rum, tequila and cognac, mixed with fruit juice, Kool-Aid or candy. They are sold mainly during the summer on the streets and on the beaches, and come in cups or small plastic bottles.

== History ==
Nutcrackers are thought to have been first made in 1993 or 1994 in the Dominican areas of Washington Heights, specifically as a cocktail at the Flor de Mayo restaurant, which styles the drink as the "Nut Cracker", and claims to be the original version. The "Nut Cracker" cocktail was invented by José Chu, a restaurant manager, and "Juice", a drug dealer, who requested a new cocktail, and was named for The Nutcracker ballet, due to a New York City Ballet ad on TV at the time. It consisted of Bacardi 151, Southern Comfort, Amaretto, pineapple juice, grenadine, and Rose's Sour Lime, and is described as strong, syrupy, sweet, and tart.

From 1999, the cocktail was then bottled and sold for $10 each by "Fatyuil", a Dominican-American hairdresser, out of her apartment on St. Nicholas Avenue, and became popular. From 2000, it was further popularized by Freddy Tejada, who sold drinks out of a barbershop on Audubon Avenue, and featured the drink in a program on a Manhattan Neighborhood Network (public access television) program, Dominican USA. It then became popular in Harlem and across the city.

== Legality ==
The sale of nutcrackers without a license violates New York law, and the police have on occasion attempted to sanction it.

In 2010, Black community leaders including Al Sharpton spoke out against the sale of nutcrackers because of the unregulated drinks' potential dangers to health and to children. In 2011, the "nutcracker bill" (A06324) sponsored by State Senator Adriano Espaillat (D – Manhattan/Bronx) and Assemblyman Nelson Castro (D – Bronx) and signed by Governor Andrew Cuomo stripped barbershops of their license if they were convicted of selling alcohol to minors.

Some nutcracker vendors have attempted to professionalize and legalize their business in order to assuage such concerns.

In 2020, the COVID-19 pandemic and resulting closure of dine-in bars and restaurants, and the newly-legal sale of alcohol to-go resulted in increased competition with traditional nutcracker sales; some to-go cocktails were sold in the same traditional juice bottle format as nutcrackers.

== Popular culture ==
Nutcrackers have been mentioned in popular culture since as early as Loaded Lux, "Nut Cracker" (2006), and popularized in N.O.R.E., "Nutcracker" (2010).

== See also ==
- Alcopop
- Hard seltzer
- Jello shot
- Jungle juice
- Purple drank
- Queen Mary (cocktail)
