= Hard seltzer =

Carbonated alcoholic beverage

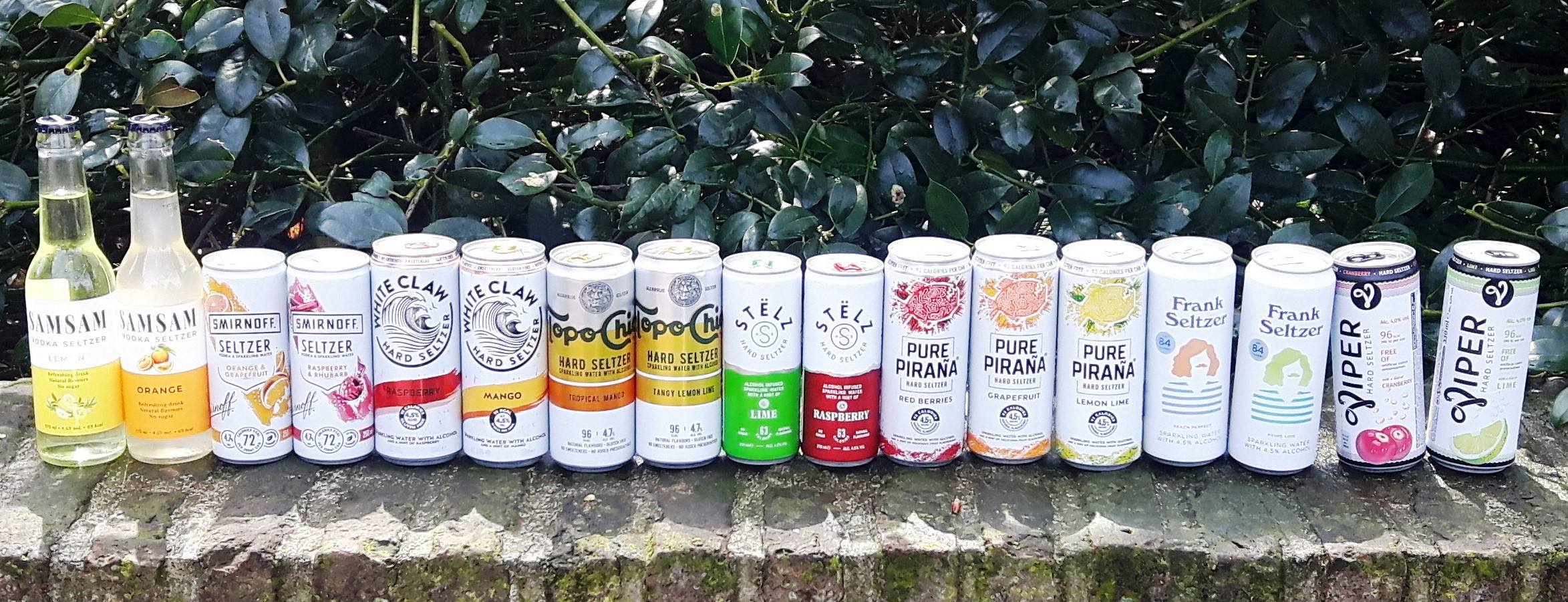
Cans of hard seltzer drinks

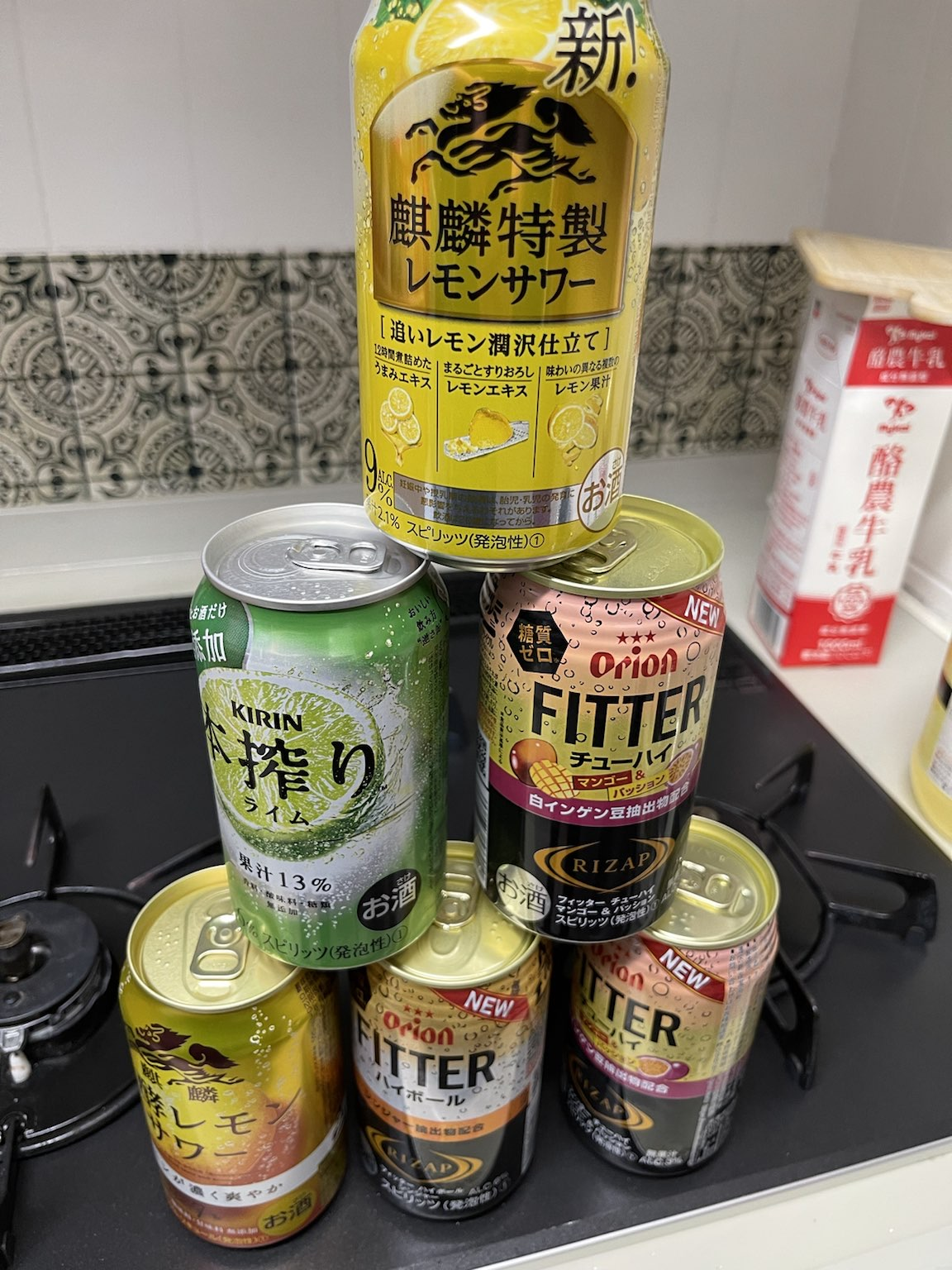
Japanese Hard Seltzer

Hard seltzer, adult seltzer, mature seltzer, spiked seltzer and hard sparkling alcohol water is a type of highball drink containing seltzer (carbonated water), alcohol, and often fruit flavorings. In the US the alcohol is usually made by fermenting cane sugar or malted barley. Hard seltzer products outside of the US often use either neutral spirit, or fermentation of fruit. The alcohol by volume is around 5% and the calorie-content is relatively low, derived almost entirely from fructose.

== History ==
The concept of flavored malt beverages has been popular since the 1990s. The first widely available commercial product was Two Dogs, which launched in Australia in 1993 and claimed to be the "world's first brewed alcoholic lemonade" (falsely, because of the pre-existence of traditional drinks like sima, a fermented Finnish drink). Two Dogs paved the way for similar products such as Hooper's Hooch and Mike's Hard Lemonade. These alcoholic alternatives were commonly known as alcopops in the United Kingdom and malternatives in America. The concept of hard seltzers started with Nick Shields developing the 'Spiked Seltzer' branding style, in Westport, Connecticut, brewing the first commercial batches in November 2013. In 2012, McKenzie River Corporation launched a beverage brand named AIR (short for Alcohol Inspired Refresher) in San Francisco, combining carbonated water with alcohol and natural flavors. It was marketed as “sparkling water with alcohol” and sold in flavors such as citrus, berry, and club. Although AIR did not use “seltzer” in their marketing, AIR was introduced to the United States market before SpikedSeltzer (2013). Some beverage analysts have since noted that AIR represents an early precursor to the hard-seltzer movement that gained widespread popularity later in the decade. Other hard seltzers rose to popularity later, in 2018. Sales of the most popular US hard seltzer brand, White Claw, grew 85% in just one year, with revenues of over $4 billion in 2020 alone. Analysts attributed the success of White Claw and the appeal of hard seltzers in general to increased demand from health-conscious consumers.

== Nutritional information ==
Across all hard seltzer brands, there is a median of 100 calories, 2g of carbs, 0-2g of sugar while still maintaining 5% alcohol. Additionally, most are gluten free. Manufacturers assert that they are healthier than more calorically heavy alcoholic beverages. For example, nutrition information is often displayed prominently on packaging. The social media presence of hard seltzer companies is massive and often depict healthy people drinking and having fun, further promoting the message that hard seltzers are a healthy alcoholic alternative. However, although it may be ‘healthier’ than some other alcoholic drinks, nutritionists have warned that it is not a healthy beverage per se. Many hard seltzers have added flavoring and are mixed with sugary soda waters to add sweetness.

== Branding ==
In addition to advertising hard seltzers as the 'healthy alternative', the marketing of hard seltzers has often relied on their trendiness. In 2019, YouTuber Trevor Wallace posted a video titled “Summer of White Claw”. This video went viral and was watched over six million times. Following the video, sales of White Claw (as well as other hard seltzer brands) rose sharply and White Claw experienced a shortage.

While alcoholic beverage ads are often targeted at one or other gender, seltzer companies have made a point to have gender-neutral advertising in order to reach the most people possible. This has also contributed to the drink's surge in popularity. The demographics of hard seltzer drinkers are Caucasians who are 21 to 44 years of age.

The rise of hard seltzers in the beer category may also be seen as a reflection of the broader surge in popularity of non-alcoholic flavored seltzers evidenced by the sudden and massive popularity of brands like LaCroix and Spindrift. On the back of this popularity, hard seltzer brands have launched in numerous countries, including Canada, Australia, Finland and the UK. In February 2020, White Claw launched in Canada and subsequently Australia and the UK.

== Fermentation process ==
Similarly to beer, fermentation is needed to make these drinks alcoholic. However, instead of yeast converting starch to glucose, the fermentation process of Hard Seltzers consists of directly fermenting a sugar base. This fermentation process yields a discoloration in the product so effective filtration practices of these colors and odors is necessary. A common filtration process consists of a carbon treatment which uses CARBOFIL RW, RHC or CA filter sheets. This creates a plain alcohol base where flavor can be added afterwards.

== Popular brands ==
Hard seltzer market shares in the United States
Brand	Percentage of market share
White Claw	50%
Truly	24.9%
High Noon	10.4%
Bud Light Seltzer	10%
Bon & Viv	1.28 %
Other	15.92%

== See also ==
- Alcopop – Flavored beverage with relatively low alcohol content
- Chūhai – Alcoholic drink from Japan
- Dirty soda – Soft drink mixture
- Hard soda – Alcoholic beverage
- High Noon (seltzer) – American alcoholic beverage brand
- White Claw Hard Seltzer – Brand of hard seltzer
- Brewing – Process in beer production
- Fermentation in food processing – Converting carbohydrates to alcohol or acids using anaerobic microorganisms
- Fermentation in winemaking – Wine making process
- Truly (brand) – American hard seltzer and vodka brand
