= Funny Face (drink mix) =

Powdered drink mix

- Product type: Drink mix (original/1st revival); Cranberry and fruit snacks (2nd revival)
- Current owner: Decas Cranberry Products (2012–present)
- Country: United States
- Introduced: 1964 (original); 1994 (1st revival); 2009 (2nd revival)
- Previous owners: Pillsbury Company (1964–1980); Brady Enterprises (1980–2001)

Funny Face was a brand of powdered drink mix originally made and publicly sold by the Pillsbury Company from 1964 to 1994, and in limited productions (mainly in the Midwestern and New England regions of the United States) from 1994 to 2001. The brand was introduced as competition to the similar (and more familiar and better-selling) Kool-Aid made by Kraft Foods. The product came in assorted flavors sweetened with artificial sweetener, and was mixed with water to make a beverage.

Original packages for the two Funny Face flavors deemed offensive and soon replaced. "Injun" was a slang alteration of "Indian" (in reference to Native Americans), extant from the 17th into the 20th centuries, and now considered racist. "Chinese Cherry" displays the exaggerated epicanthic fold and buck teeth typical of stereotypes of East Asians in the United States, extant in the 20th and into the 21st centuries, particularly seen in American World War Two anti-Japanese propaganda, and now considered racist as well.

The product name "Funny Face" was based on the packaging and advertising created by Hal Silverman of the Campbell Mithun advertising agency. Each flavor was designated by a cartoon character with a presumably amusing face. The original flavors, and their names, were Goofy Grape, Rootin'-Tootin' Raspberry, Freckle Face Strawberry, Loud-Mouth Lime, Injun Orange, and Chinese Cherry. These last two, being ethnic stereotypes considered offensive by that time, were soon revamped to Jolly Olly Orange and Choo Choo Cherry, respectively. Additional flavors were added later, including Lefty Lemon (later called Lefty Lemon-Lime and Lefty Lemonade), Captain Black Cherry, Chilly Cherry Cola, Loud-Mouth Punch (who was a re-working of the Loud-Mouth Lime character), Pistol Pink Lemonade, Rah! Rah! Root Beer, Rudy Tutti-Frutti, Tart Lil' Imitation Lemonade, Tart 'N' Tangy Lemon, Tart n' Tangy Orange, and With-It Watermelon. Chug-A-Lug-a Chocolate was added much later, after the brand had passed to the Brady Company. This product was intended to be mixed with milk rather than water.

The mix was sweetened with calcium cyclamate. Cyclamates and their salts (including calcium cyclamate and sodium cyclamate) were banned in the United States in 1970; Calcium cyclamate was briefly replaced by saccharin, which proved unpopular, after which the product was offered unsweetened.

Various promotional tchotchkes were offered as premiums in support of the brand, such as mugs and pitchers bearing the likeness of the various cartoon faces associated with each flavor. A series of children's books such as How Freckle Face Strawberry Got His Name and similar titles were published.

The brand's tagline was "Funny Face is Fun To Drink!"

The Funny Face brand was purchased by Brady Enterprises in 1980, and continued to sell nationwide until 1994. A limited production relaunch (albeit with some modifications) was briefly sold in selected areas from 1994 to 2001. On November 28, 2012, Decas Cranberry Products of Carver, Massachusetts, resurrected the names and personas of four of the original characters – Rootin' Tootin' Raspberry, Freckle Face Strawberry, Choo Choo Cherry, and Goofy Grape – for a line of flavored dried cranberry and fruit snacks.

== Notes ==
1. During the period covered by this article, the Pillsbury Company was an independent food company. It was purchased by Grand Metropolitan in 1989 and then by General Mills in 2001, by which time it was just a brand name used by General Mills (and by The J.M. Smucker Company, for some products).
2. Later in its existence the Funny Face line was sold unsweetened.

== Further reading and listening ==
- Silverman, Hal (1966). How the Funny Face Characters Got Their Names. Pillsbury Corporation. (Children's book)
- Goofy Grape Sings (With The Whole Funny Face Gang) at Discogs
