= MiO =

Liquid beverage mix

- Former logo used from the brand's introduction until 2024

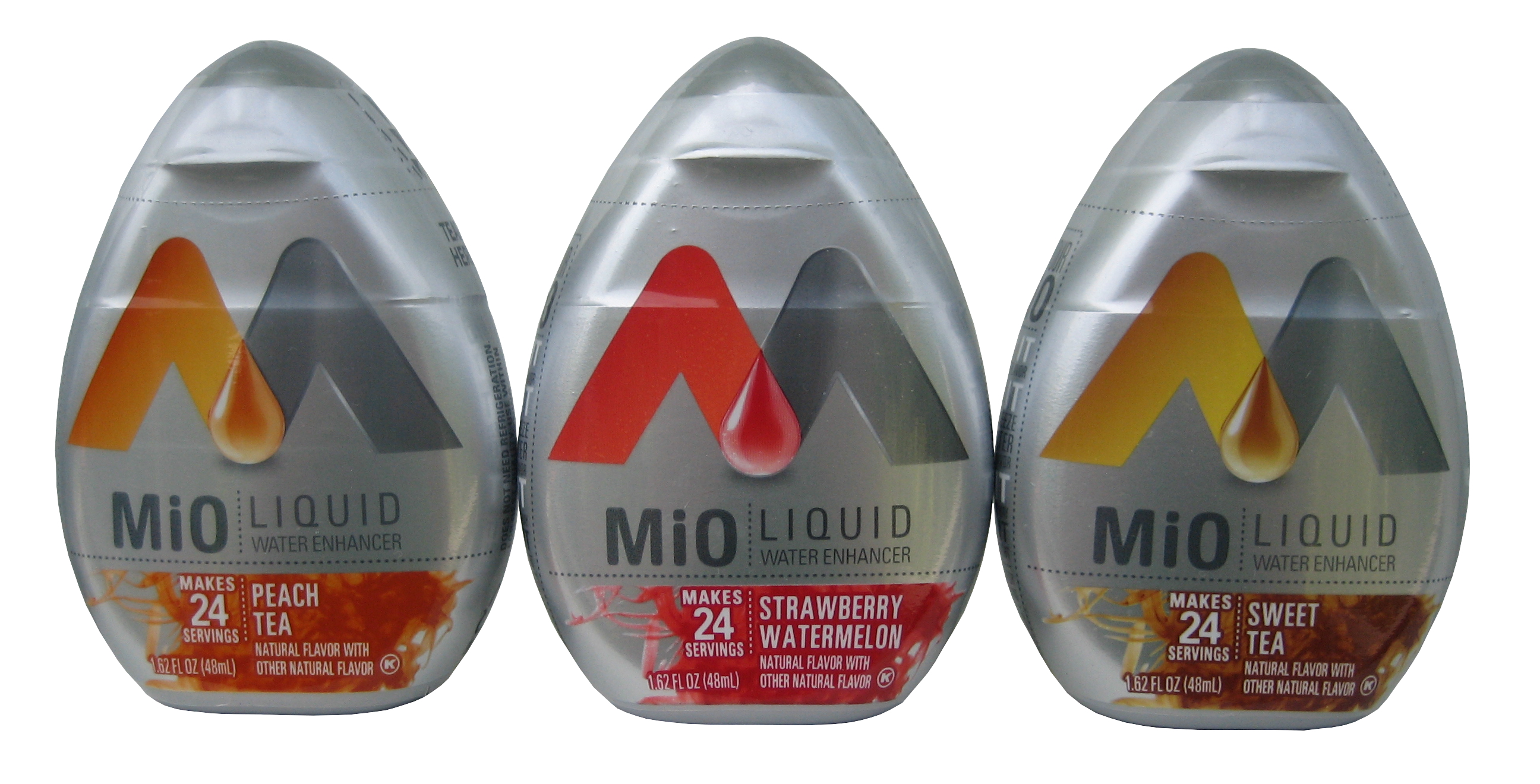
- Product type: Beverage mix
- Current owner: Kraft Heinz
- Introduced: 2011; 15 years ago
- Website: makeitmio.com

MiO (stylized as mıo since 2024) is a liquid beverage mix owned by Kraft Heinz, which intends it as an additive to flavor water, carbonated water, and other beverages. It was introduced in 2011. In 2019, MiO launched a line of powdered beverage mixes in addition to its liquid offerings.

== Ingredients ==
MiO products are artificially colored and sweetened with concentrated syrups. Caffeinated variants of the MiO brand are marketed as MiO Energy. This version of the product contains 60 mg of caffeine per serving. MiO is listed as containing less than 2% natural flavors. Other listed ingredients are citric acid, malic acid, sucralose, acesulfame potassium, potassium citrate, gum arabic, sucrose acetate isobutyrate, Red 40, Blue 1, and potassium sorbate.

== Advertising ==
MiO advertising initially centered on The Second City character Sassy Gay Friend, portrayed by comedian-actor Brian Gallivan. Gallivan had already created comedy videos that featured this character in stories from literature or history (such as Romeo & Juliet). He began adding short dialogs about the product into these clips. His slogan for the product was "Flip it. Tip it. Sip it!" In two later "man on the street" style videos, he demonstrates the product to passers-by.

MiO later started an advertisement campaign with the slogan "Make it Yours, Make it MiO". This advertising featured animated animals discussing the product.

== See also ==
- Borg (drink)
