= Moth Drinks =

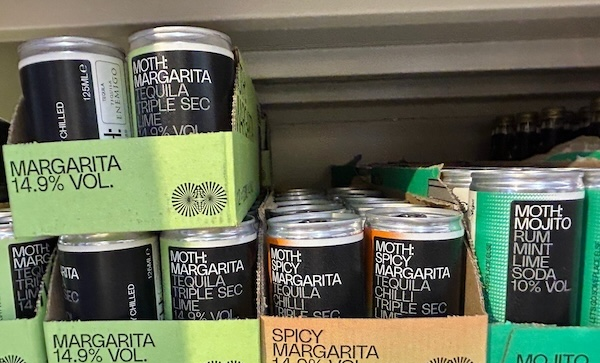
Cans of cocktail drinks made by Moth Drinks at a shop

Moth Drinks is a British company that makes ready-to-drink cocktails, based in Eastcote, London.

It was founded in 2019 by Rob Wallis and Samuel Hunt who were friends at the University of York.
