= White Claw Hard Seltzer =

Brand of hard seltzer

- Type: Alcoholic beverage
- Manufacturer: Mark Anthony Group/Mark Anthony Brewing
- Origin: USA
- Introduced: 2016; 10 years ago
- Alcohol by volume: 5% (US & Canada) and 4.5% (International markets)
- Style: Hard seltzer
- Ingredients: Purified carbonated water, alcohol, natural flavors, natural cane sugar, citric acid, sodium citrate
- Website: www.whiteclaw.com

White Claw Hard Seltzer is an alcoholic seltzer water beverage manufactured by Mark Anthony Group. The beverage was introduced in 2016 and is sold in 12 various flavors.

The beverage is made from a blend of seltzer water, a gluten-free malted alcohol base, and fruit flavor. The alcohol base (termed "beer base" in customs rulings) is composed of 51% sugar, smaller amounts of yeast and nutrients, water, and trace amounts of "malted gluten-free grains". The exact recipe and methods are trade secrets.

== History ==
White Claw was created by Mark Anthony Group, run by Vancouverite Anthony von Mandl and also known for producing Mike's Hard Lemonade. The brand experienced tremendous growth after its introduction in 2016. Von Mandl told Forbes his U.S. business is estimated to deliver close to $4 billion in revenue in 2020. In the summer of 2019, it was reported that White Claw accounted for over half of all total hard seltzer sales in the United States; volume sales of White Claw grew 275% over the year prior.

White Claw entered the Canadian market in 2020 with limited flavours, later expanding offerings. The Canadian version is made with vodka rather than a beer base.

New flavors were introduced in for the American market in March 2020 and again in March 2021, along with iced tea seltzers.

In 2021, U.S. Customs and Border Protection (CBP) sought to re-classify White Claw in the Harmonized Tariff Schedule of the United States, when importing the product. Previously classified as "beer" (to which no tariffs apply), CBP felt the beverage belonged to the category of "other fermented beverages", to which tariffs do apply. Reasons cited were that White Claw "does not have the taste, aroma, character or appearance of beer" and "is not named beer, and importantly, is not sold or marketed as beer". The reclassification was made final on June 2, 2021, and took effect on August 1, 2021.

In December 2023, White Claw released non-alcoholic seltzers with 0% alcohol.

== Popularity in the U.S. ==
From 2016–2020, hard seltzer sales increased at a triple-digit annual rate. In 2019, White Claw was noted the top-selling hard seltzer in the country, with 60 percent of the category market. The same year, the surge in White Claw's popularity was met with a national shortage. Throughout 2019, White Claw's popularity grew as a result of the hard seltzer's being circulated through viral social media videos, similar to the advertising of Bang Energy Drink. In the White Claw social media videos, many included the slogan "Ain't no laws when you're drinking Claws," coined in a video by YouTube comedian Trevor Wallace which gained 4.2 million views.

In July 2020, White Claw recorded a 246.7% increase in sales when compared to the summer months of 2019.

Identifying a shift in drinking trends, in December 2023, White Claw, with a reputation for hard seltzers, released a 0% alcohol seltzer. They've noticed a trend for Gen Z and Millennial groups leaning towards more sober socials. In response, White Claw has stated their 0% products will have the taste customers have come to enjoy while maintaining the sophistication of an alcoholic beverage. They plan to bottle and can flavors consumers like, are from familiar brands with electrolytes and less sugar.

== Flavors and varieties ==
There are 29 flavors of the White Claw, divided into five varieties. The non-alcoholic seltzers are the newest addition as of December 2023, with Hard Seltzer Surge having the highest alcohol content of 8%.

Varieties

- Vodka + Soda (4.5% alcohol)
  - Flavors: Watermelon, Wild Cherry, Peach, Pineapple
- Hard Seltzer Surf (5% alcohol)
  - Flavors: Citrus Yuzu Smash, Tropical Pomelo Smash, Watermelon Lime Smash, Wildberry Acai Smash.
- Hard Seltzer “Refrshr” Lemonade (5% alcohol)
  - Flavors: Limon with a hint of Calamansi, Blood Orange with a hint of Raspberry, Blackberry with a hint of Red Cherry, Strawberry with a hint of Kiwi.
- “Refreshr” Hard Seltzer Ice Tea (5% alcohol)
  - Flavors: Ice Tea Lemon, Ice Tea Peach, Ice Tea Mango, Ice Tea Strawberry.
- Hard Seltzer (5% alcohol)
  - Flavors: Black Cherry, Mango, Watermelon, Natural Lime, Ruby Grapefruit, Raspberry, Lemon, Tangerine, Strawberry, Blackberry, Pineapple, Passion Fruit, Peach, Green Apple, Grape, Cranberry, Blood Orange.
- Hard Seltzer Surge (8% alcohol)
  - Flavors: Blackberry, Natural Lime, Blood Orange, Cranberry, Green Apple, Passion Fruit, Pineapple, Strawberry.
- Non-alcoholic White Claw (0% alcohol)
  - Flavors: Black Cherry Cranberry, Mango Passion Fruit, Peach Orange Blossom, Lime Yuzu.
- White Claw Tequila Smash (5% alcohol)
  - Flavors: Strawberry Guava, Pineapple Passion Fruit, Mango Tamarind, and Lime Prickly Pear.

== Facilities ==
Mark Anthony Brewing, the subsidiary company that produces White Claw in the U.S., operates a manufacturing plant in Glendale, Arizona, and a distribution center in Hillside, New Jersey. In May 2022, Mark Anthony Brewing opened a 1.3 million-square-foot manufacturing plant in Richland County, South Carolina, with capacity to package approximately 80 million cases per year of White Claw Hard Seltzer, Mike's Hard Lemonade, and related brands. The design-build project was constructed by Clayco, with Lamar Johnson Collaborative as architect of record, and was later named Best Manufacturing Project in ENR Southeast's 2023 Best Projects competition.

== See also ==
- Truly (brand)
