= Bacardi Breezer =

Fruit-based drink

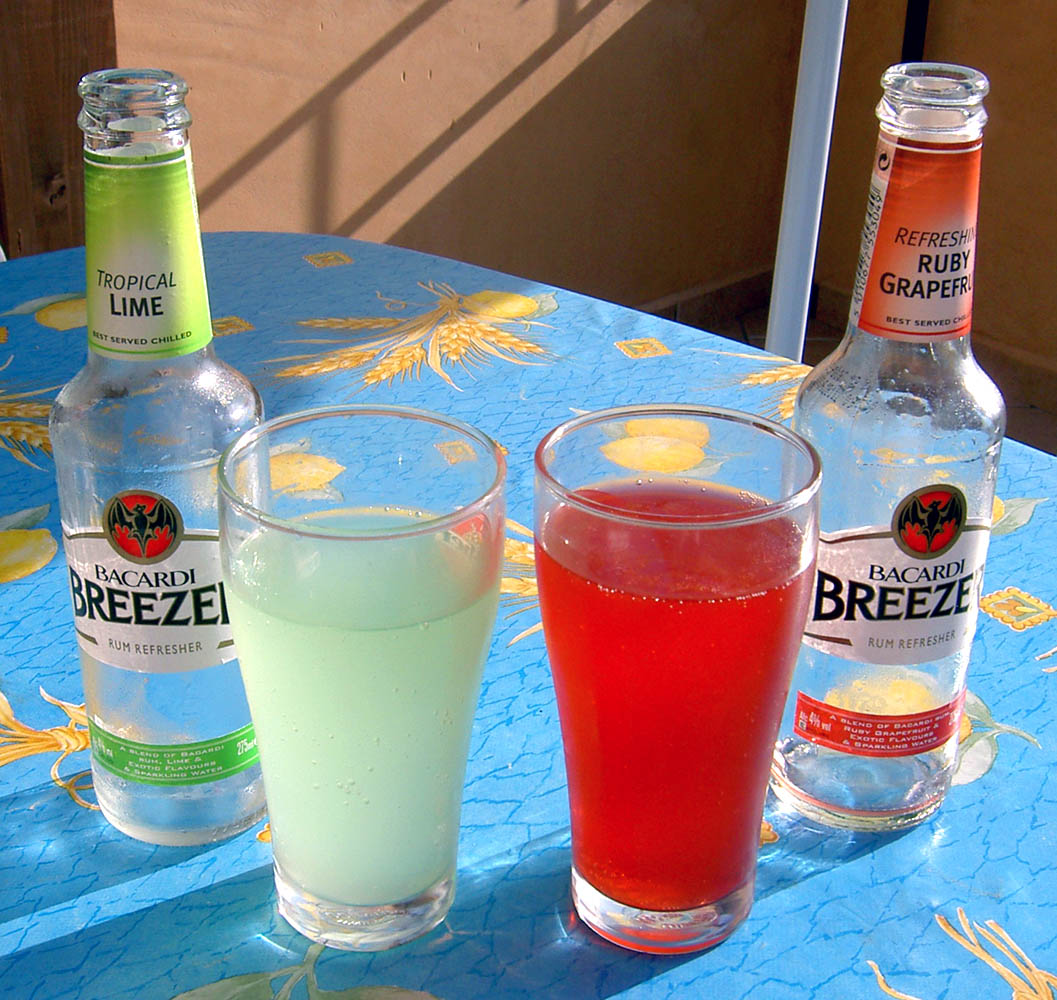
Bacardi Breezer Tropical Lime and Ruby Grapefruit

Bacardi Breezer is an alcoholic fruit-flavoured drink made by Bacardi that comes in a variety of fruit flavours: lemon, peach, lychee, pineapple, apple, ruby grapefruit, lime, orange, blackberry, watermelon, cranberry, coconut, raspberry, blueberry, pomegranate, strawberry, and mango, premixed as a cocktail with Bacardi rum, sparkling water, and added sugar. In some countries, it is also available in chocolate flavour. A number of the flavours are available in the Half Sugar range.

The drink is popular in India, Europe, Israel, Canada and Australia, and is also available in China. In India, Bacardi Breezer was the first entrant in the ready to drink category and is currently the market leader in its segment. In Thailand, Breezers are actually wine coolers but still give the appearance that they contain fruits.

In the UK, the Bacardi Breezer was launched in 1993 and became one of the most popular alcopops, particularly in the 1990s and 2000s, and was discontinued in 2015. In May 2025 it was revealed that Breezers would be making a UK comeback in the summer of 2025.

A new fruit wine-based variant has been released, called Breezer Spritzed.

== See also ==
- Alcoholic beverage
- Alcopop
