= Alcopop =

Flavored beverage with relatively low alcohol content

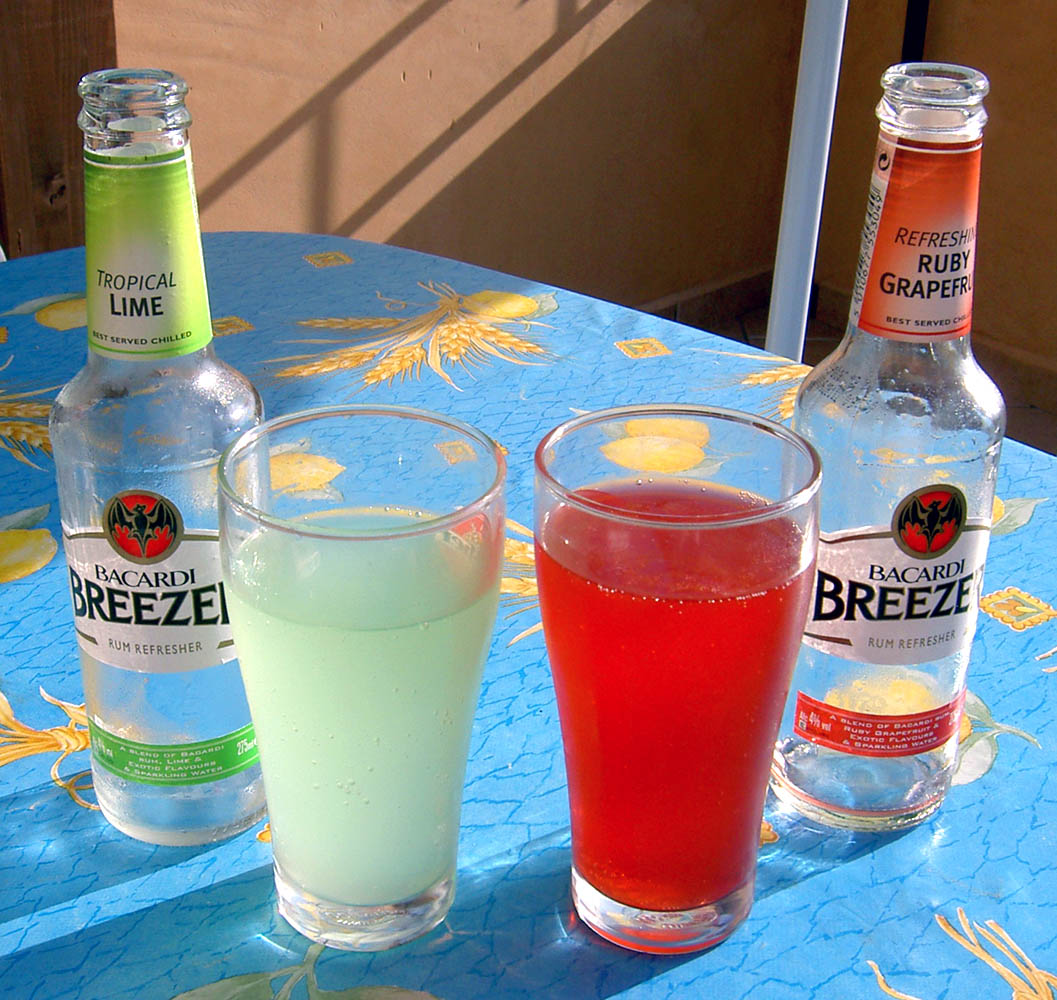
Lime and Grapefruit Bacardi Breezers, made with Bacardi rum

An alcopop (or cooler (Note: The term "cooler" is usually used in Canada.)) is a category of mixed alcoholic beverages with relatively low alcohol content (e.g., 3–7% alcohol by volume), including:

1. Malt beverages to which various fruit juices or other flavorings have been added
2. Wine coolers: beverages containing wine to which ingredients such as fruit juice or other flavorings have been added
3. Mixed drinks containing distilled alcohol and sweet liquids such as fruit juices or other flavourings

The term alcopop (a portmanteau of the words alcohol and pop) is used commonly in the United Kingdom and Ireland to describe these drinks. In English-speaking Canada, "cooler" is more common but "alcopop" may also be used. Other terms include flavored alcoholic beverage (FAB), flavored malt beverage (FMB), "pre-packaged" or "premium packaged" spirit (PPS). In Australia and New Zealand "premix" and ready to drink (RTD) are both commonly used terms. "Spirit cooler" is used in South Africa for distilled alcohol versions.

Hard seltzer is a related category of alcoholic drinks based on flavored seltzer water. Hard soda, meanwhile, is specifically related to soft drinks. Hard lemonade, which could be considered an alcopop, has been around for some time. Hard cider, on the other hand, is a fermented beverage similar to wine or beer.

== Description ==
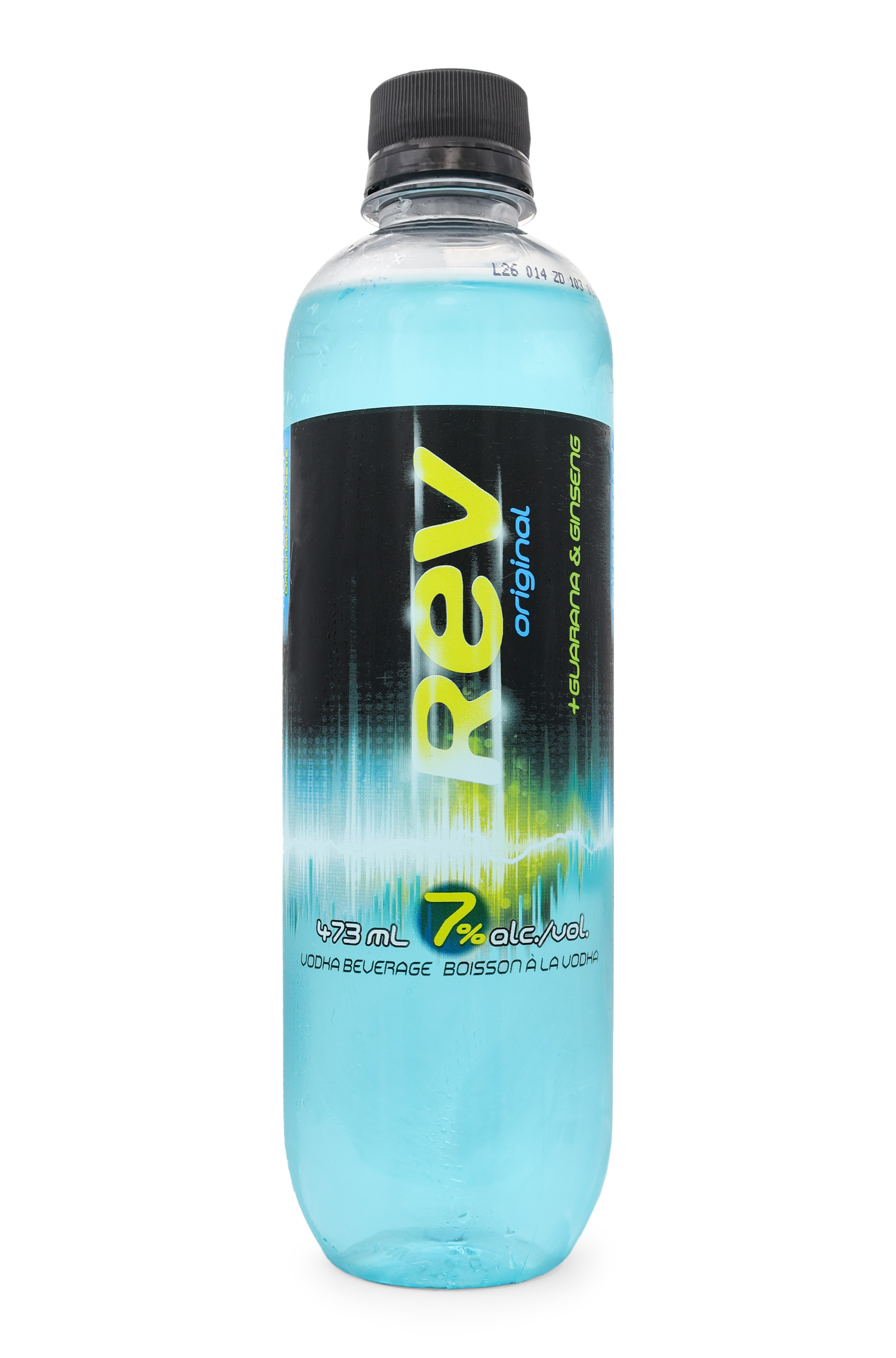
A bottle of blue Rev, a vodka cooler from Canada

There are a variety of beverages produced and marketed around the world as well as within each market which are described as coolers or alcopops. They tend to be sweet and served in small bottles (typically 355 ml (the normal size of a soda pop can) in the US, 275 ml in South Africa and Germany, 330 ml in Canada and Europe), and between 4% and 7% ABV. In Europe, Canada, and South Africa coolers tend to be pre-mixed spirits, including vodka (e.g. Smirnoff Ice) or rum (e.g. Bacardi Breezer). In the United States, on the other hand, alcopops often start out as un-hopped beers, depending on the state in which they are sold. Much of the malt (and alcohol) is removed (leaving mostly water), with subsequent addition of alcohol (usually vodka or grain alcohol), sugar, coloring and flavoring. Such drinks are legally classified as beers in virtually all states and can therefore be sold in outlets that do not or cannot carry spirit-based drinks. There are, however, stronger ones that are simply pre-mixed spirits (e.g. Bacardi Rum Island Iced Tea), often containing about 12.5% alcohol by volume, that can be sold only where hard liquor is available.

== History ==
Wine coolers gained popularity in the US market in the 1980s when Bartles and Jaymes began advertising their brand of wine coolers, which were followed by other brands, including when Bacardi introduced the Breezer. A growth in popularity occurred around 1993 with Two Dogs, DNA Alcoholic Spring Water, Hooper's Hooch and Zima, which was marketed under the title of "malternative beverage." Wine coolers were on the decline due to the increase in the US federal wine tax, and using a malt-beverage base became the new industry standard. Later, Mike's Hard Lemonade was released in the United States, with humorous commercials depicting what they called "violence against lemons". Smirnoff also came out with another citrus-flavored malt beverage in the United States in the late 1990s called Smirnoff Ice, which promoted itself with flashy commercials, usually involving trendy young people dancing in unlikely situations and places. (In the UK, Smirnoff Ice is marketed by Diageo as a PPS.)

Through its Alcopop-Free Zone® campaign, " Alcohol Justice has sought to ban alcopop sales entirely since the sweet and brightly colored alcoholic drinks may appeal to children. Many cooler advertising campaigns have been criticized as trying to make alcopops appeal to young drinkers. In the United Kingdom, a media outcry during the mid-1990s arose as the tabloid press associated alcopops with under-age drinking which damaged sales and led to British liquor stores withdrawing them from their shelves.

In response to a complaint from the Center for Science in the Public Interest (CSPI), the Federal Trade Commission (FTC) conducted an extensive investigation in 2001. The agency "found no evidence of intent to target minors with FMB products, packaging, or advertising. Furthermore, after reviewing the consumer survey evidence submitted by CSPI in support of the proposition that FMBs were predominantly popular with minors, the FTC concluded that flaws in the survey's methodology limited the ability to draw conclusions from the survey data."

The Federal Trade Commission again in 2003 investigated FMB ads, product placement, and internal company marketing documents after a directive from the conferees of the House and Senate Appropriations Committees. "The Commission's investigation found no evidence of targeting underage consumers in the marketing of FMBs. Adults 21 to 29 appear to be the intended target of FMB marketing" and found that "the majority of FMB drinkers are over the age of 27."

In December 2003, Ireland raised the tax on flavored malt beverages to equal that of spirits, the second-highest in Europe. Germany has imposed an extra duty of 0.80 to 0.90 euro per bottle effective August 1, 2004. To circumvent higher taxation, some German producers have switched to wine coolers, which are being marketed the same way. Some bottles now carry a warning stating that they are not for consumption by people under the legal drinking age (under 18 in the UK and 21 in the United States). On May 11, 2008, the Australian Government increased the excise tax on alcopops by 70%, to bring it in line with the tax on spirits. There is the concern this tax will encourage consumers to buy straight spirits and mix the drinks themselves, possibly resulting in drinks with a higher alcohol concentration than the premixed alternatives. This tax was revoked during March 2009 meaning the government had to pay back the 290 million collected on the tax.

The Federal Trade Commission report states, "Further, industry-conducted research on consumers over the age of 21 who use FMBs shows that these consumers generally view the FMBs as substitutes for beer, ... This research also concludes that consumers are not likely to consume more than two or three FMBs on any occasion because of the products' sweetness.

In March 2018, Coca-Cola announced it would be launching an alcopop product for the first time, a chūhai beverage in Japan.

== Brands ==
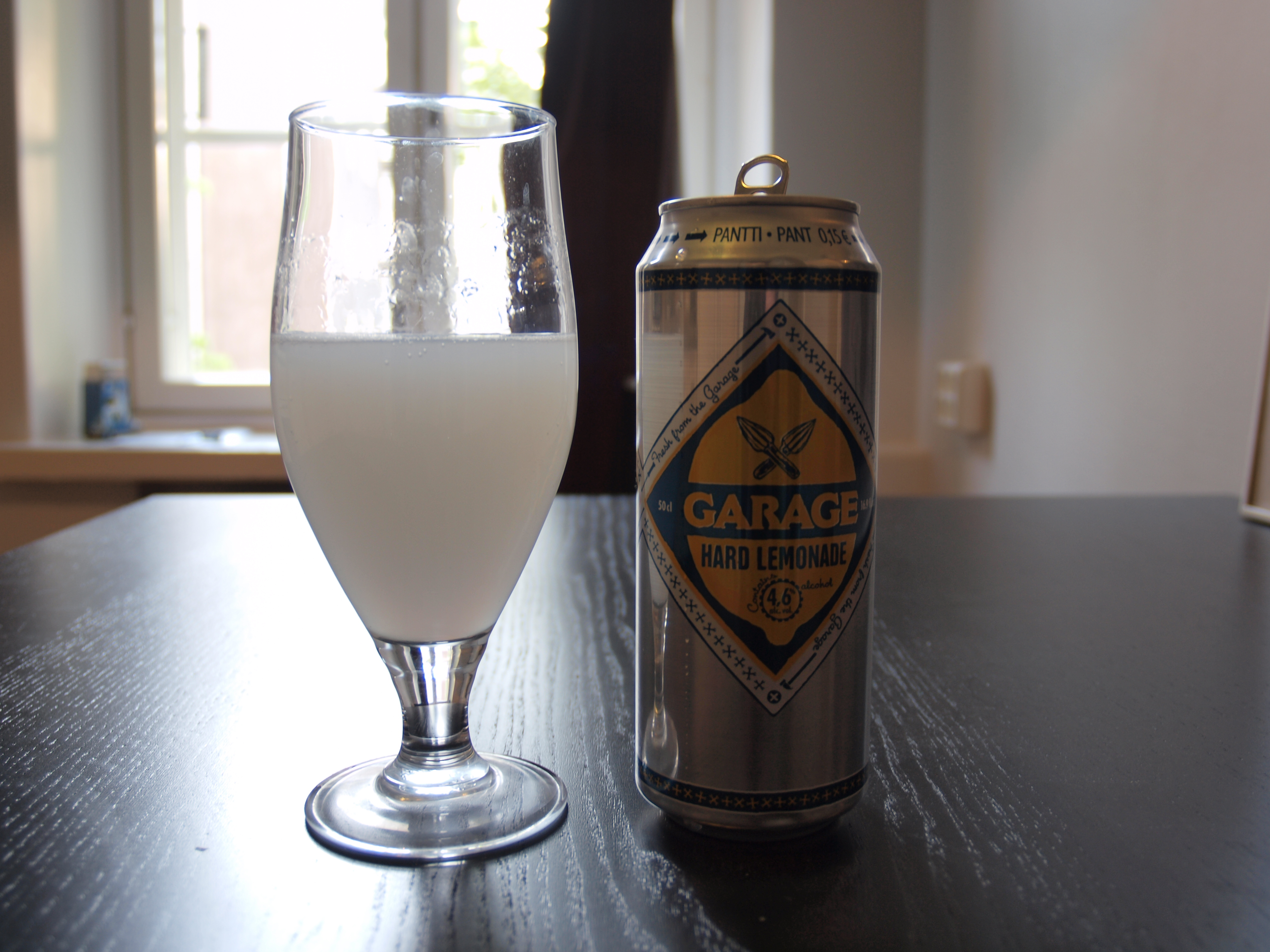
Garage Hard Lemonade from Finland is a lemon-flavoured alcopop whose 4.6% ABV matches that of many commercial beers.

Brands of coolers are numerous and their alcoholic base vary greatly. Some notable brands include: VK, Smirnoff Ice, Mike's Hard Lemonade, Bacardi Breezer, Palm Bay, Skyy Blue, Jack Daniel's mixed with Coca-Cola and, in the UK, WKD Original Vodka. Garage is an alcopop produced by the Finnish brewery Sinebrychoff.

== Health concerns ==
Alcohol-based sugar-sweetened beverages like alcopop are closely linked to episodic drinking in adolescents.

== Attempts to discourage ==
=== Australia ===
The Australian government increased the tax on these drinks under the 2008 budget to the same rate as spirits, volumetrically, in an effort to stop binge drinking. The tax was criticized by the opposition as a tax grab, and voted down in the Senate on March 18, 2009. Before its rejection, the tax had already raised at least A$290 million after April 2008. In April 2009, some Labor party MPs planned to resubmit the tax to the Senate, and it was finally approved in August 2009, increasing the tax on the drinks from $39.36 to $66.67 per litre of alcohol. A 2013 study concluded that the tax had no impact on binge drinking of the drinks by teenagers.

=== Germany ===
On 1 July 2004 the German government increased the tax on mixed drinks based on spirits (e.g. vodka, rum) by roughly one Euro per 275-ml-bottle in order to discourage teenagers drinking excessively, although those drinks were already prohibited for those under the age of 18. This had two implications: The most common alcopops, such as Smirnoff Ice or Bacardi Breezer, were nearly taken off the market, while other manufacturers changed the recipes of their drinks to replace spirit alcohols with wine or beer, but with the same ABV, enabling these mixed drinks (which are not "alcopops" under German law) to be sold legally to minors 16 and 17 years of age.

=== Philippines ===
In 2019, some senators including Pia Cayetano and former Special Assistant to the President Bong Go called for pullout of alcopops from the market due to "deceptive packaging that resembles fruit juices usually bought by young consumers". Alcopops also have seven percent alcohol content, which is slightly lower than that of local beer brand Red Horse Beer.

=== Sweden ===
Systembolaget blocked the sale of alcoholic soft drinks in Sweden until mid-1996, when Alkoholsortimentsnämnden decided, with reference to Treaty of Rome Article 30, that Systembolaget could not refuse to sell certain products. This led to great debate, where the marketing of the alcoholic soft drink was considered to be aimed above all at young people. After initially great sales successes, the popularity has now declined, and many of the alcoholic drinks' market shares have been taken over by sweeter varieties of cider that share many characteristics with the soft drink but have been fermented to their alcoholic strength.

=== United Kingdom ===
In June 1997, Co-op Food became the first major retailer to place an outright ban on the sale of alcopops in its shops. This has since been revoked.

== See also ==
- Borg (drink)
- Chuhai
- Hard seltzer
- Hard soda
- Jello shot
- Jungle juice
- Liqueur
- Nutcracker (drink)
- Purple drank
- Queen Mary (beer cocktail)
