= Drink mix =

Processed food product

A drink mix is a processed-food product, designed to mix usually with water to produce a beverage resembling juice, soda, or other sweet products in flavor. Another type of drink mix is represented by products that are mixed into milk. Most drink mixes are powdered, but some are liquid-concentrate.

== History ==
The first juice-type powdered drink mix was Poly Pop, invented by Paul Stevens Hollis in 1922. He sold it as part of the Big State Company until its acquisition by General Foods in 1953.

== Ingredients ==
Powdered drink mixes may contain sugar, or artificial sweeteners, including aspartame, saccharin, acesulfame-K, sucralose and often include artificial flavors and colors. Powdered drink mixes without sugar will often contain water-soluble filler ingredients such as maltodextrin or dextrose. Products may also include vitamins, electrolytes, caffeine, or other nutrients.

== Marketing and varieties ==
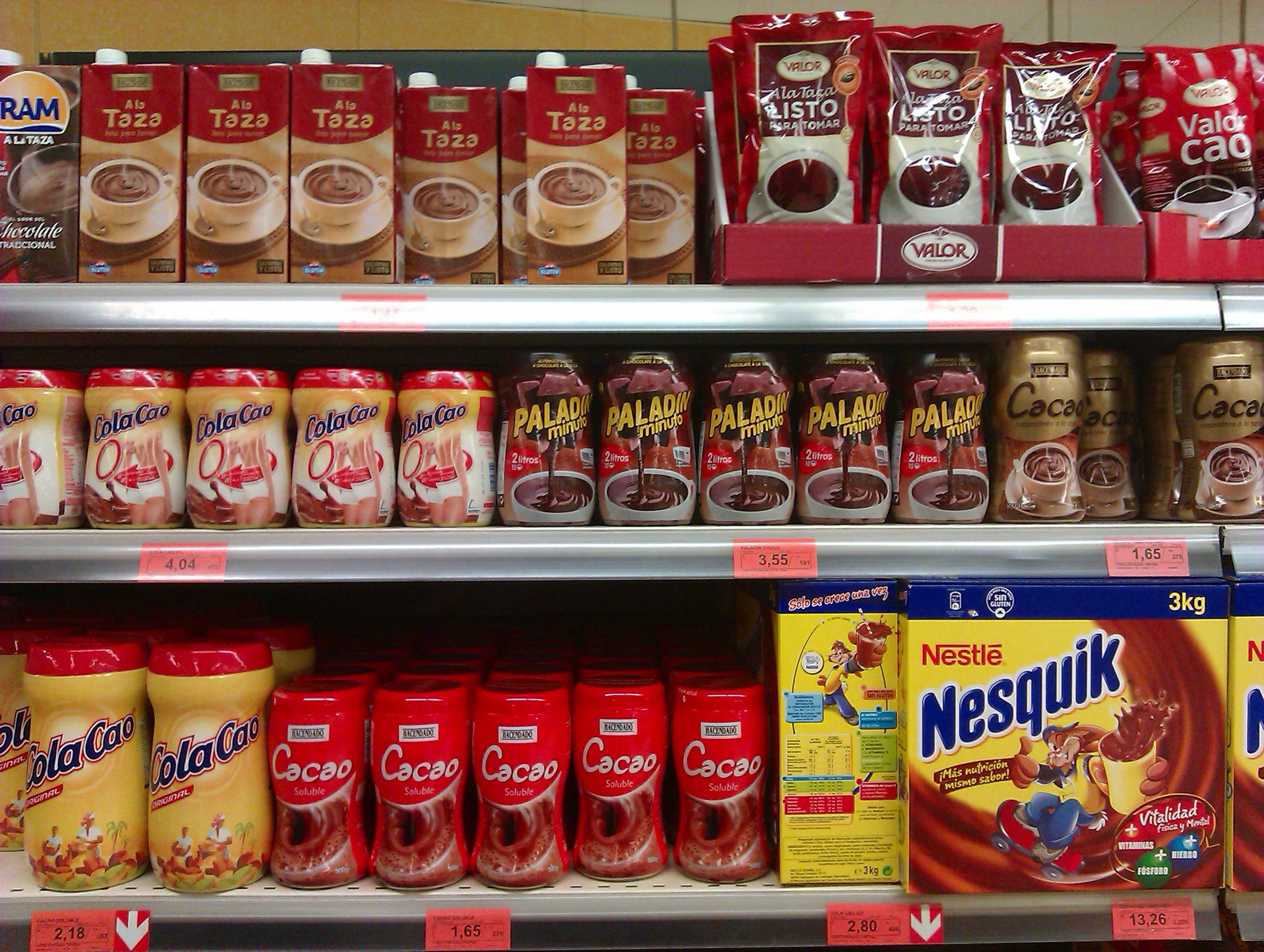
Chocolate drink mix products, that must be mixed with milk; in a supermarket in Spain.

Powdered drink mixes are marketed for a variety of purposes and consumer groups including children, athletes, bodybuilders, and consumers seeking nutritional or dietary supplements. Some brands are only sold as drink mixes, while some beverage companies produce powdered versions of their products, such as Gatorade and Ocean Spray. Another form of drink mix is represented by products mixed into milk, such as malted milk, Nesquik, Ovaltine, and Carnation Instant Breakfast.

Marketing the convince of single serve packets created a 7 percent growth rate between 2006 and 2007 in the powdered beverage market.

== Packaging ==
Drink mixes are packaged to protect the product from moisture, air and light.

Powdered drink mixes can be found as bulk, resealable containers or as single-serve pouches or sticks. Pouches may be made of a laminate of paper and aluminum foil. Powdered coffee is often packaged in single-serve coffee container for use in beverage machines.

Liquid concentrates are often sold in squeezable bottles or as single-serve pouches. A patent for a liquid concentrate squeeze bottle was issued to Kraft Foods in 2012.

== Drink mix brands ==
- Bolero
- Burple (discontinued)
- Cedevita
- Country Time
- Crystal Light (primarily to female dieters)
- Emergen-C (vitamin supplement, with sugar or unsweetened)
- Flavor Aid (primarily marketed to children)
- Fruty
- Funny Face (primarily marketed to children)
- G Fuel
- Kool-Aid (primarily marketed to children)
- Milo (drink)
- MiO
- Nesquik (mix)
- Prime Hydration+ Sticks
- Raro
- Rasna
- Tang

== See also ==
- Instant coffee
- Instant tea
- Powdered milk
- Squash (drink)
