= Trevor Wallace =

American comedian (born 1992)

- Born: December 30, 1992 (age 33); Naperville, Illinois, U.S.
- Education: San Jose State University
- Occupations: Comedian; YouTuber

YouTube information
- Channel: Trevor Wallace
- Subscribers: 6.44 million
- Views: 4 billion
- Last updated: September 25, 2026

Trevor Auburn Wallace (born December 30, 1992) is an American comedian, writer, actor, and social media influencer from Camarillo, California. Wallace is a regular on the YouTube channel All Def Digital and has been featured on BuzzFeed, UNILAD, Funny or Die, Super Deluxe, Fusion TV, WorldStarHipHop, and MTV2.

== Early life and education ==
Wallace was born in Naperville, Illinois but grew up in Camarillo, California. He is Jewish. He graduated from San Jose State University. During his time in college, he was a member of the Delta Upsilon fraternity.

Wallace first took an interest in comedy at the age of 17, when his mother encouraged him to join a six-week comedy class at the Ventura Harbor Comedy Club. Despite his initial reluctance, Wallace "just fell in love with it" and would later remark that the class encouraged him to pursue a career as a professional comic: "once when I did stand-up, everything just clicked and I was like, this is what I was meant to do".

== Career ==
Wallace's comedy career began with making short videos for the hosting platform Vine while attending San Jose State University. After university, he moved to Los Angeles in 2015 and begun an internship with sketch comedy school and troupe The Groundlings. He has created several viral comedy videos about the brand Zumiez that have been viewed more than fourteen million times as of 2017. He also created a comedy video about AirPods that was widely viewed. Wallace's May 2019 video about men named Kyle has furthered its appearance in memes relating the name to "angry, Monster Energy-chugging white boys". In July 2019, Wallace released a viral video satirizing drinkers of White Claw Hard Seltzer, along with a line of t-shirts that read "Ain't No Laws When You're Drinking Claws"; the beverage company responded with a cease and desist order.

As of 2018, Wallace works for All Def Digital, which is based in Los Angeles. He made regular guest appearances on the All Def comedy YouTube series, Great Taste. He also performs stand-up comedy, including at venues such as San Jose Improv, Zanies Comedy Club in Nashville, and Orpheum Theatre in Arizona. Wallace and comedian Michael Blaustein are the co-hosts of the podcast Stiff Socks, which began in 2019.

Wallace's first 1-hour comedy special, Pterodactyl, premiered on Amazon Prime on November 13, 2023.

== Awards and nominations ==
Year	Award	Category	Result	Ref.
2020	Shorty Awards	Comedy	Nominated	
