= Ready to drink =

Type of beverage

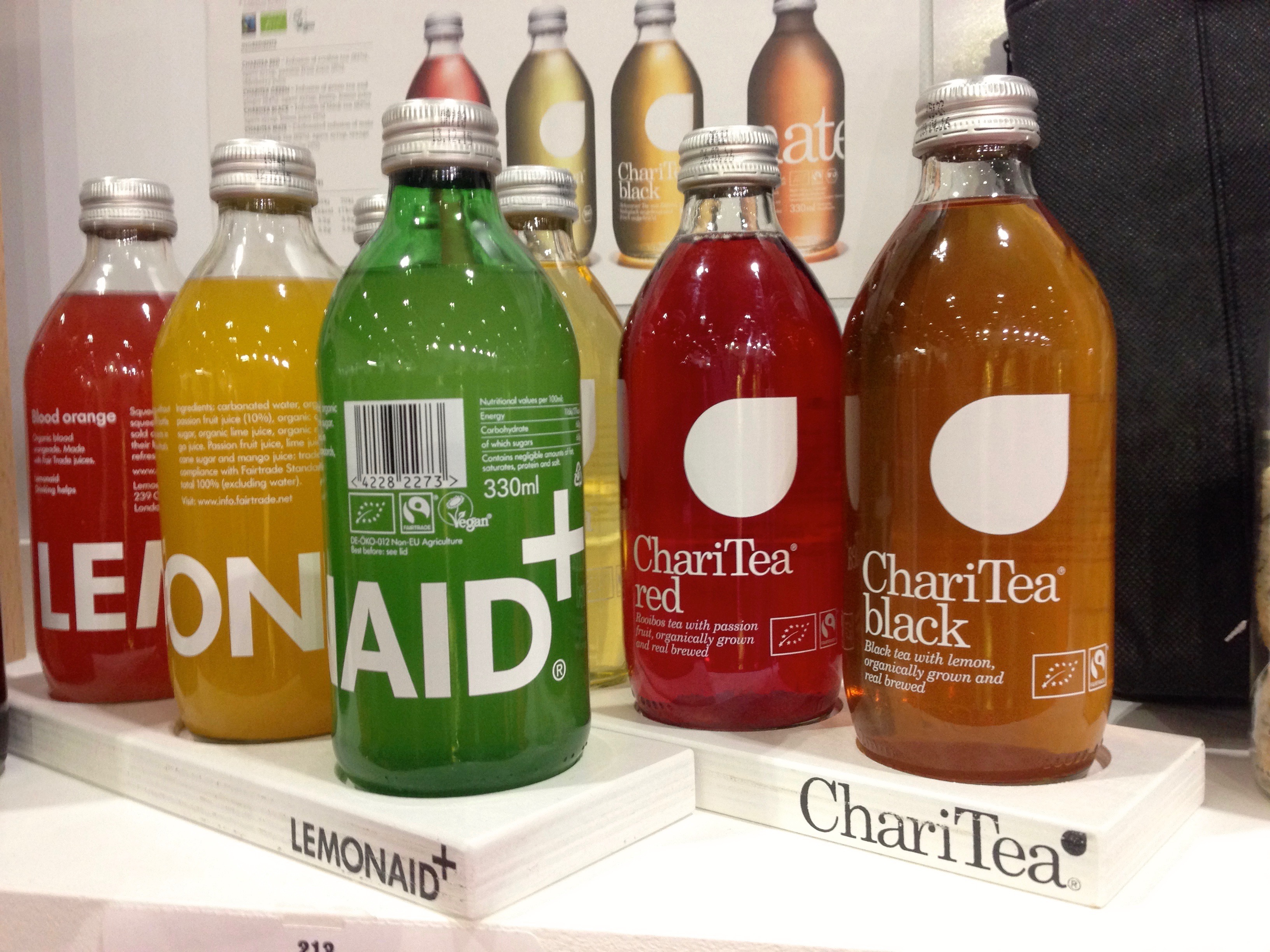
Bottles of flavored iced tea

Ready to drink (RTD) packaged beverages are those sold in a prepared form, ready for consumption. Examples include iced tea (prepared using tea leaves and fruit juice) and alcopops (prepared by mixing alcoholic beverages with fruit juices or soft drinks).

== RTD cocktails ==
RTD cocktails are cocktails that have been pre-batched and bottled or canned. The benefits of having such a drink is that the customer does not need to worry about balance, technique or having multiple ingredients at home. The idea is that the customer will open the cocktail and simply pour and serve.

RTD cocktails date to the late 1800s, with Heublein selling pre-mixed cocktails under the “Club Cocktails” brand since 1892. The popularity of the RTD category has varied significantly over the years and between markets, most recently growing significantly in the US from the 2010s with brands such as Seven Days Cocktail Co. and OTR: On The Rocks..

== Alcopops ==
Alcopops are mainly ready made alcoholic cocktails that are carbonated and bottled under various brand names. Alcopops are the most commonly consumed type of RTD in the world after iced tea. Alcopops are banned in some countries due to religious and cultural prohibitions on the consumption of alcohol. A number of studies have linked the marketing of alcopops to increased occurrences of underage drinking.

The industry term for this range of products is flavored malt beverages or progressive adult beverages. The majority sold in the United States are essentially flavored beer.

Alcopops can be based on different types of spirits and liquors, such as vodka-based or rum-based.

A notable type is Lonkero, a Finnish mixed drink of grapefruit soda and gin, introduced as an RTD for the 1952 Olympics, which has continued to be popular in Finland.

=== Brands ===
Alcopop brands are numerous and their alcoholic base vary greatly. notable brands include:

- WKD
- Smirnoff Ice
- VK
- Mike's Hard Lemonade
- Bacardi Breezer
- Brookvale Union
- Skyy Blue
- Bartender's Trading
- Wild Leap Blueberry Vodka
- Jack Daniel's mixed with Coca-Cola
- MG Spirits
- Vodka Cruiser
- Moth
- Truly
- White Claw
- Evolve HardPop
- Doc Wylder's

== Non-alcoholic beverages ==
Non-alcoholic RTDs can be further separated into dairy and non-dairy drinks.

- Flavoured milk
- Iced coffee
- Chocolate milk
- Energy drinks
- Iced tea
- THC drinks

== See also ==
- Canned coffee
