= Truly (brand) =

American hard seltzer and vodka brand

- Product type: Hard seltzer, vodka
- Current owner: Boston Beer Company
- Country: United States
- Introduced: 2016
- Tagline: Keep It Light
- Website: trulyhardseltzer.com

Truly is a brand of hard seltzer and vodka produced by the Boston Beer Company introduced in 2016.

== History ==
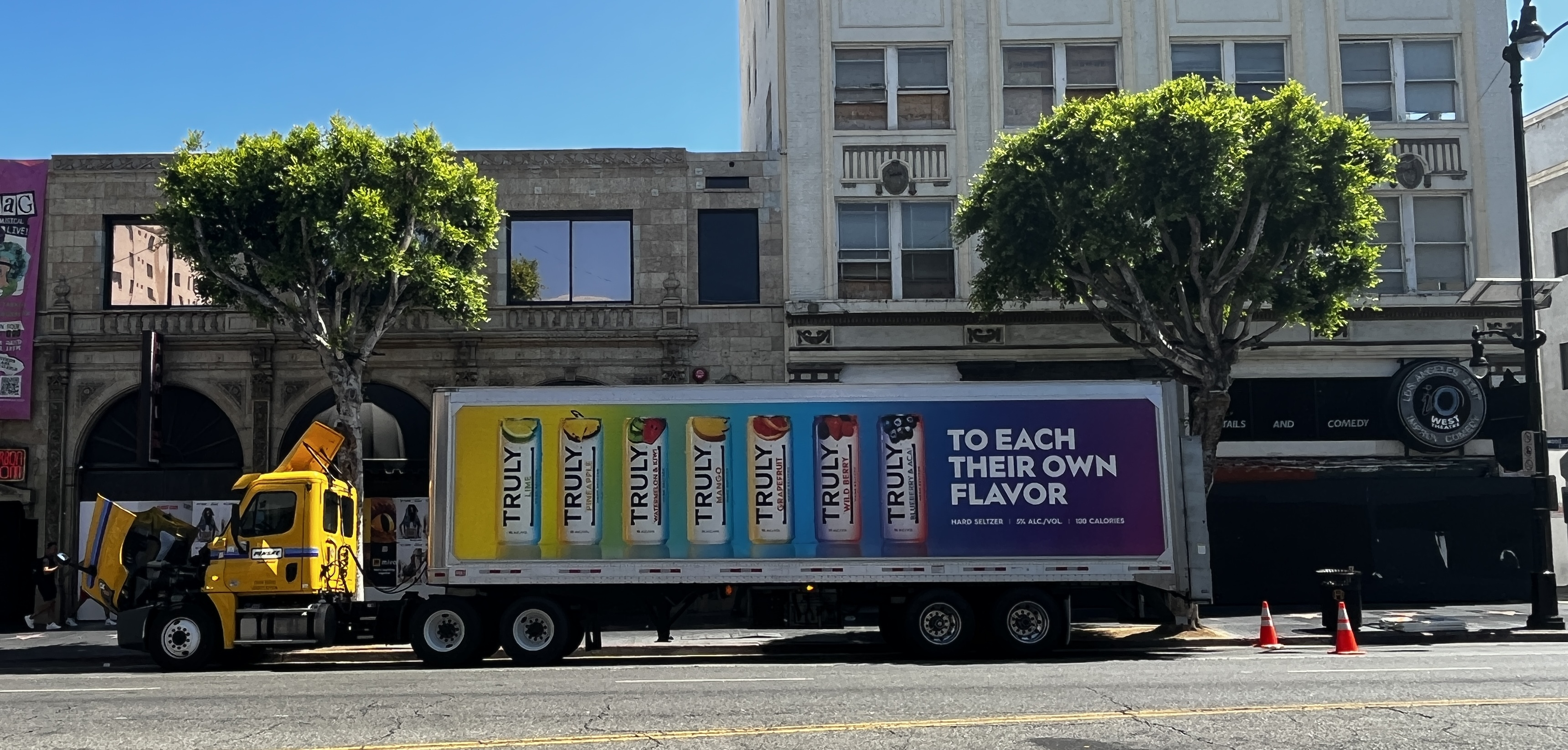
Truly advertisement on the side of truck in California in 2022

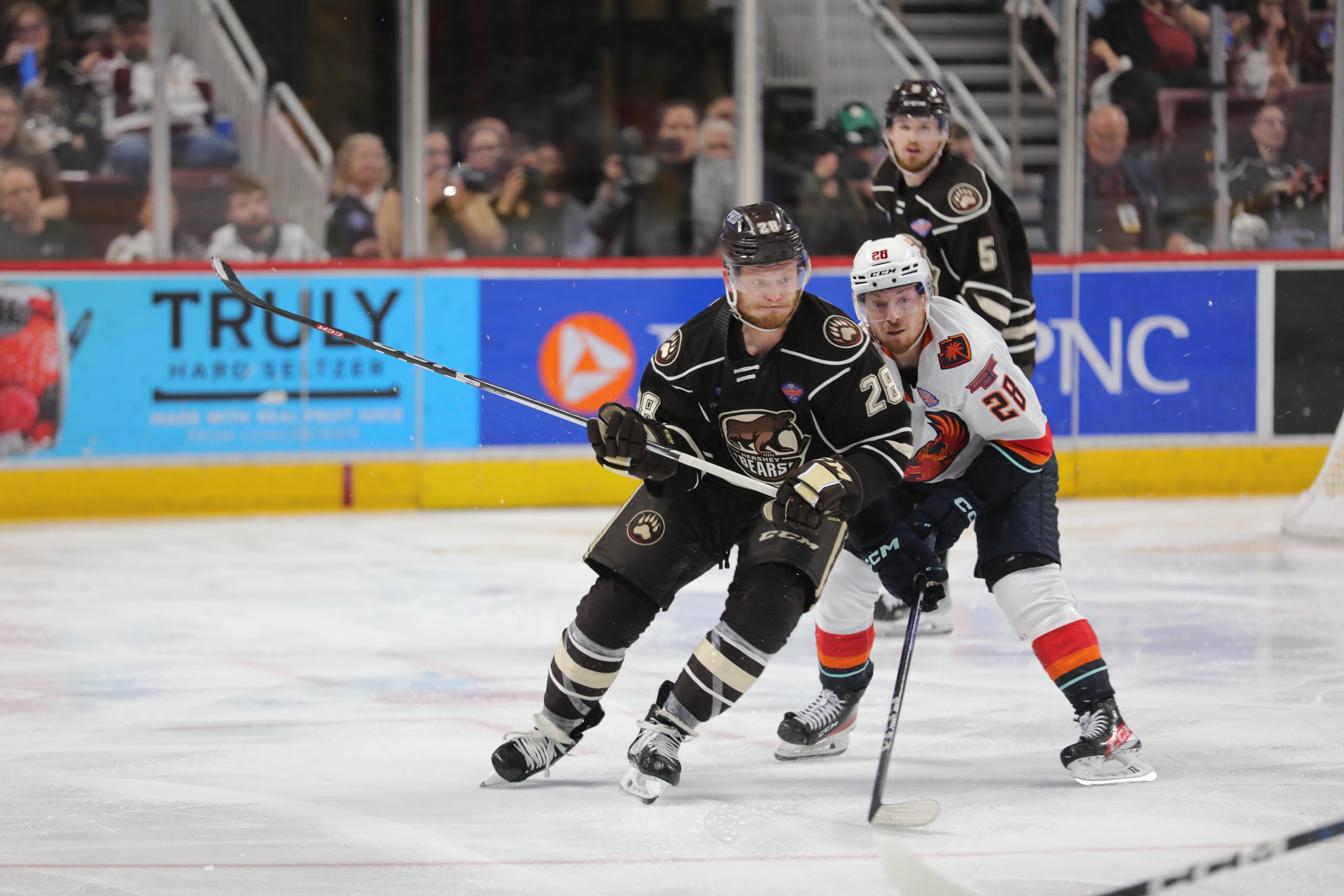
Truly advertisement at the 2023 Calder Cup Finals

Truly was launched as a hard seltzer brand in 2016.

In 2019 Truly and competitor White Claw together controlled 85% of the hard seltzer market. Truly reformulated their flavors in 2019 in order to deal with increased competition. Also in 2019 Truly was offered on an airline for the first time through a partnership with JetBlue.

The Truly brand was one of the largest drivers of Boston Beer Company's sales growth over this period. In 2021 the Boston Beer Company said that the hard seltzer craze was coming to an end sooner than expected which was negatively impacting market growth. At that time Truly and competitor White Claw controlled 75% of the hard seltzer market. A 2021 marketing effort saw the brand satirize Dry January as "Try January" inducing millennials to try Truly.

The Boston Beer Company refreshed the Truly brand in 2023 to adjust to the new post-craze market. The brand continued to decline as a percentage of the Boston Beer Company's earnings through 2024.

== Products ==
=== Hard seltzer ===
Truly's hard seltzer is made using a cane sugar based fermented but not distilled alcohol. The production process is similar to that for hard kombucha.

In 2019 it introduced hard seltzer On tap.

In 2021 the brand had 30 flavors across its hard seltzer portfolio.

In 2021 Truly launched Truly Extra with an ABV of 8%.

In 2023 Truly introduced spirits based hard seltzer in addition to its traditional malt alcohol based offerings.

=== Vodka ===
In 2022 Truly branded vodka produced with Beam Suntory was released. It was initially offered in three flavors.

== See also ==
- Seltzer
- Samuel Adams (beer)
