= Hooper's Hooch =

1990s brand of alcopop

Hooper's Hooch (often simply referred to as Hooch) is an alcopop that was most popular during the mid-1990s. The name Hoopers refers to William Hooper, inventor of the hot water bottle and manufacturer of lemonade in the 1840s whose trademark was owned by Burton upon Trent-based brewer Bass. Launched in Britain in 1995 by Bass as an alcoholic lemonade, it attained immediate popularity, leading to the development of orange- and blackcurrant-flavoured versions.

At its peak, 2.5 million bottles of Hooper's Hooch were sold each week in Britain, and it was the market leader for alcopops with up to 70% of the market. However, alcopops became less popular, and the drink was discontinued in the UK in 2003. Research by the Prime Minister's Strategy Unit found that between 1995 and 2001, alcopop consumption by children "grew markedly", while between 1992 and 2001, consumption of alcohol among 11 to 15-year-olds rose by 63%.

It was reintroduced in 2012 in a lower alcohol formulation.

The success of Hooper's Hooch began an industry-wide trend of incorporating lighter, less calorific drinks with alcohol equal to the amount found in a standard beer or glass of wine.

== Creation ==
The packaging for Hooper's Hooch was created by KLP Scotland, the marketing and packaging agency for the Bass Brewery.

== Criticism ==
At the time, along with other alcopops, the drink received criticism for encouraging underage drinking by appealing to children due to its sweet taste and use of cartoon-like advertising. With an ABV of 5.0% it was actually stronger than most lagers. In 1996 an advertising campaign for Hooch was criticised by the Advertising Standards Authority (ASA) for appealing to underage drinkers. In 1997 the drink was relaunched with an 'unambiguously adult look' and a reduced sugar content to tackle that criticism, while Co-op supermarkets, Iceland, J D Wetherspoon and Whitbread stopped selling alcopops.

== Re-introduction ==
Hooch was reintroduced to consumers in the UK in July 2012 following a nine-year absence, with the new marketing slogan "refreshment with bite!". Its bite, however had been reduced from its original nineties formulation with the new version having an ABV of 4.0%, compared to 4.7% previously. It is sold in the UK by Global Brands Ltd and in Asia by Resolute International Marketing BV under licence from Hooch owner Molson Coors. In 2014, new adverts emerged on television featuring Leigh Francis as his character Keith Lemon entering a bar and asking for "'ooch" in his trademark Leeds accent, with the bartender unable to understand what he means.
