= Mike's Hard Lemonade Co. =

American flavored malt beverage company

Mike's Hard Lemonade Co. (USA)
- Type: Privately held company
- Industry: Alcoholic beverages
- Founded: 1996
- Headquarters: Levittown, Pennsylvania, United States
- Area served: United States
- Website: mikeshard.com

Mike's Hard Lemonade Co. is an alcopop supplier based in Levittown, Pennsylvania. It is part of Badlands Beverage Brands, Inc. as of 2017. Founded in 1996 by Canadian businessman Anthony von Mandl under the brand name Mark Anthony. In 1999, the company began selling in the US market. Mike's partnered with the United Service Organizations in 2018, donating $250k.
