= Gin and tonic =

Drink made with gin and tonic water

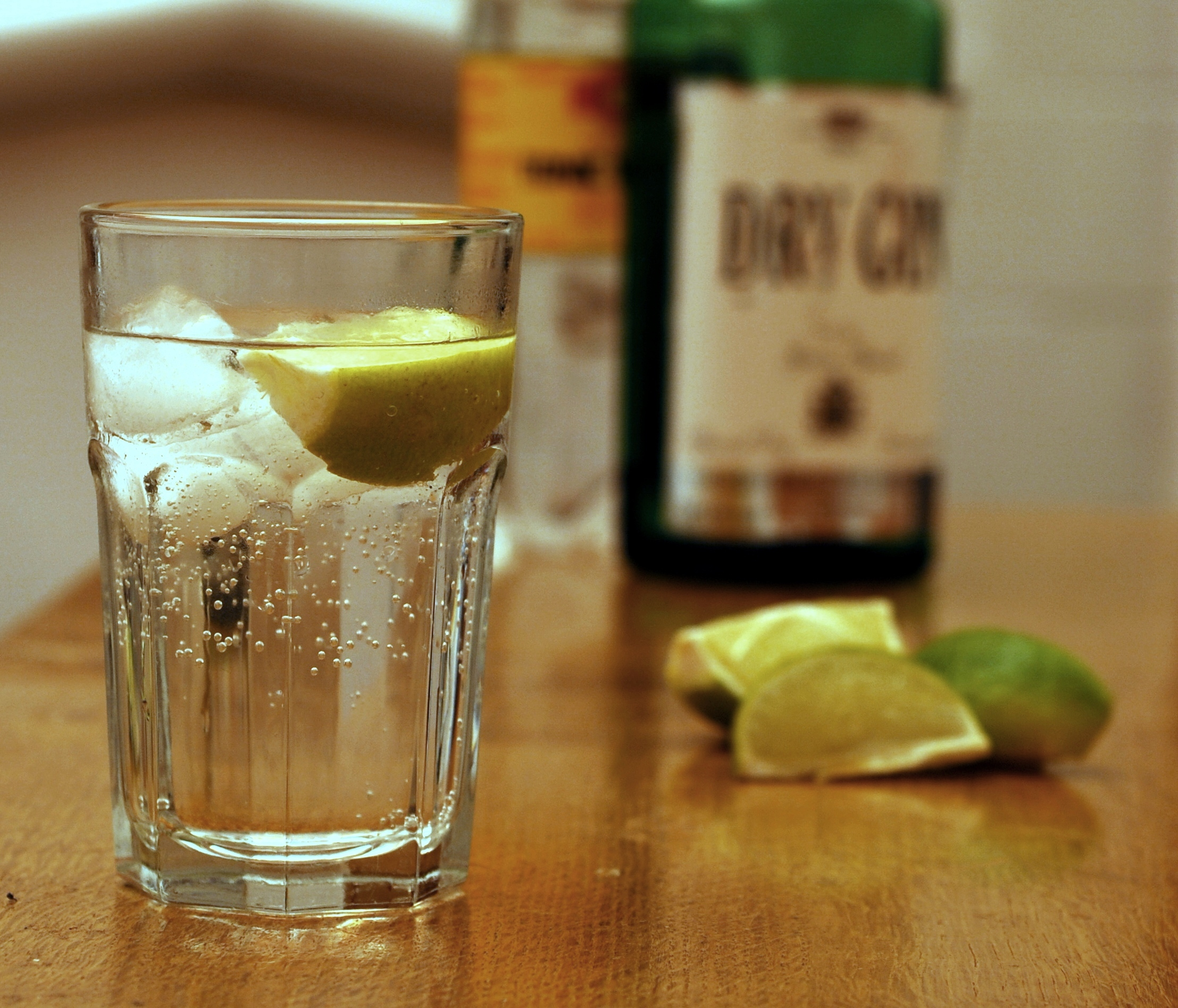
- Gin and tonic with lime wedge
- Type: Highball
- Ingredients: Gin and tonic water, according to taste
- Base spirit: Gin
- Standard drinkware: Highball glass
- Standard garnish: A slice of lime
- Served: Poured over cubes of ice ("on the rocks")
- Preparation: In a glass filled with ice cubes, add gin and tonic.

A gin and tonic is a highball cocktail made with gin and tonic water poured over ice. The ratio of gin to tonic varies according to taste, strength of the gin, other drink mixers being added, etc., with most recipes calling for a ratio between 1:1 and 1:3. It is usually garnished with a slice or wedge of lime. To preserve effervescence, the tonic can be poured down a bar spoon. The ice cools the gin, dulling the effect of the alcohol in the mouth and making the drink more pleasant and refreshing to taste.

It is commonly referred to as a G and T, or G&T, in the UK, US, Canada, Australia, New Zealand and Ireland. In countries such as Germany, Italy, France, Japan, the Netherlands, Spain, Turkey, it is called a gin tonic (Japanese: ジン・トニック, Hepburn: jin tonikku). It is sometimes referred to as ginto in the Netherlands and France, and GT in the Nordics.

It has its origins in British military officers, stationed in British India during the 19th Century.

== Garnish and serving ==
Gin and tonic is traditionally garnished with a slice or wedge of lime, often slightly squeezed into the drink before being placed in the glass. In most parts of the world, lime remains the only usual garnish; however, lemon is often used as an alternative fruit. In the United Kingdom, the use of both lemon and lime together is known as an "Evans". Although the origins of the use of lemons are unknown, their use dates back at least as far as the late 1930s. The use of lemon or lime is a debated issue – some leading brands, such as Gordon's, Tanqueray, and Bombay Sapphire, recommend the use of lime in their gin.

The use of a balloon glass for serving gin has become popular, possibly through promotion by the Bombay Sapphire gin brand. The use of such a glass, with plenty of ice and a garnish tailored to the flavours of the gin, is sometimes said to allow the aromas of the drink to gather at its opening for the drinker to more easily appreciate.

The use of assorted fruits, herbs, and vegetables, as garnish (reflecting the botanicals of the individual gin), is increasingly popular. Besides the classic lime wheel or wedge, alternative garnishes can include orange peel, star anise, thyme, elderflower, a slice of ginger, pink grapefruit, rosemary, cucumber, mint, black peppercorns, strawberry and basil, strawberry syrup, or chillies. Fruits such as kumquats or other citrus or cucumber can be included.

== History ==
In India and other tropical regions, malaria was a persistent problem for Europeans, and during the 18th century the Scottish doctor George Cleghorn studied how quinine, a traditional cure for malaria, could be used to prevent the disease. The first mixture of tonic water began to be sold in 1858, and the British military took to procuring massive amounts of the beverage for medicinal purposes, mixing it with lime to prevent scurvy. The mixture, however, was bitter and unpleasant due to the high concentration of quinine.

Gin had been used by soldiers in battle as a calming agent as early as the Thirty Years' War. A similar gin ration had been in place for military officers in British India. These officers took to adding sugar and gin to this tonic water in order to make the cure more palatable, thus creating the cocktail. This was not the first time liquor was used with quinine to improve taste: certain surgeons in the American Civil War recommended taking the antimalarial with whisky. Since it is no longer used as an antimalarial, tonic water today contains much less quinine, is usually sweetened, and is consequently much less bitter. The first known reference to gin and tonic in print is present in the Oriental Sporting Magazine, indicating that it was a common phrase called out during a horse race.

A 2004 study found that after 12 hours, "considerable quantities (500 to 1,000 ml) of tonic water may, for a short period of time, lead to quinine plasma levels at the lower limit of therapeutic efficacy and may, in fact, cause transitory suppression of parasites". This method of consumption of quinine was impractical for malaria prophylaxis, as the amount of drug needed "cannot be maintained with even large amounts of tonic". The authors concluded that it is not an effective form of treatment for malaria.

== Variations ==
Mixers can include lime juice, lemon juice, orange juice and spiced simple syrup, grenadine, tea, etc.

A gin and tonic can also be mixed with a sorbet.

Some gin-and-tonic inspired drinks also have champagne (e.g., the Parisian), vermouth and bitters (e.g., the Posh G&T), super smokey whiskey (e.g., the Ol' Smokey), peach liqueur and grapefruit bitters (e.g., the Tonic Delight), mint bitters, and chocolate liqueur (e.g., the Guilty Pleasure), etc.

== In popular culture ==
In Top Gear and The Grand Tour, Jeremy Clarkson, James May, and Richard Hammond were known to be quite fond of the drink, and drank them on camera a number of times, in one case causing controversy when Jeremy Clarkson appeared to drink one whilst behind the wheel of a car driving to the North Pole.

James Bond specifies a recipe for a gin and tonic while in Kingston, Jamaica, in the book Dr. No. Unusually, it involves the juice of a whole lime.

Billy Joel mentions "tonic and gin" in his 1973 song Piano Man.

In the BBC1 and Amazon Prime television series Fleabag, Fleabag and the Priest enjoy canned G&Ts from Marks and Spencer. The store reported a 24% increase in sales after the episodes aired.

Founded in 2010, International Gin & Tonic Day is celebrated worldwide on 19 October.

== Images ==
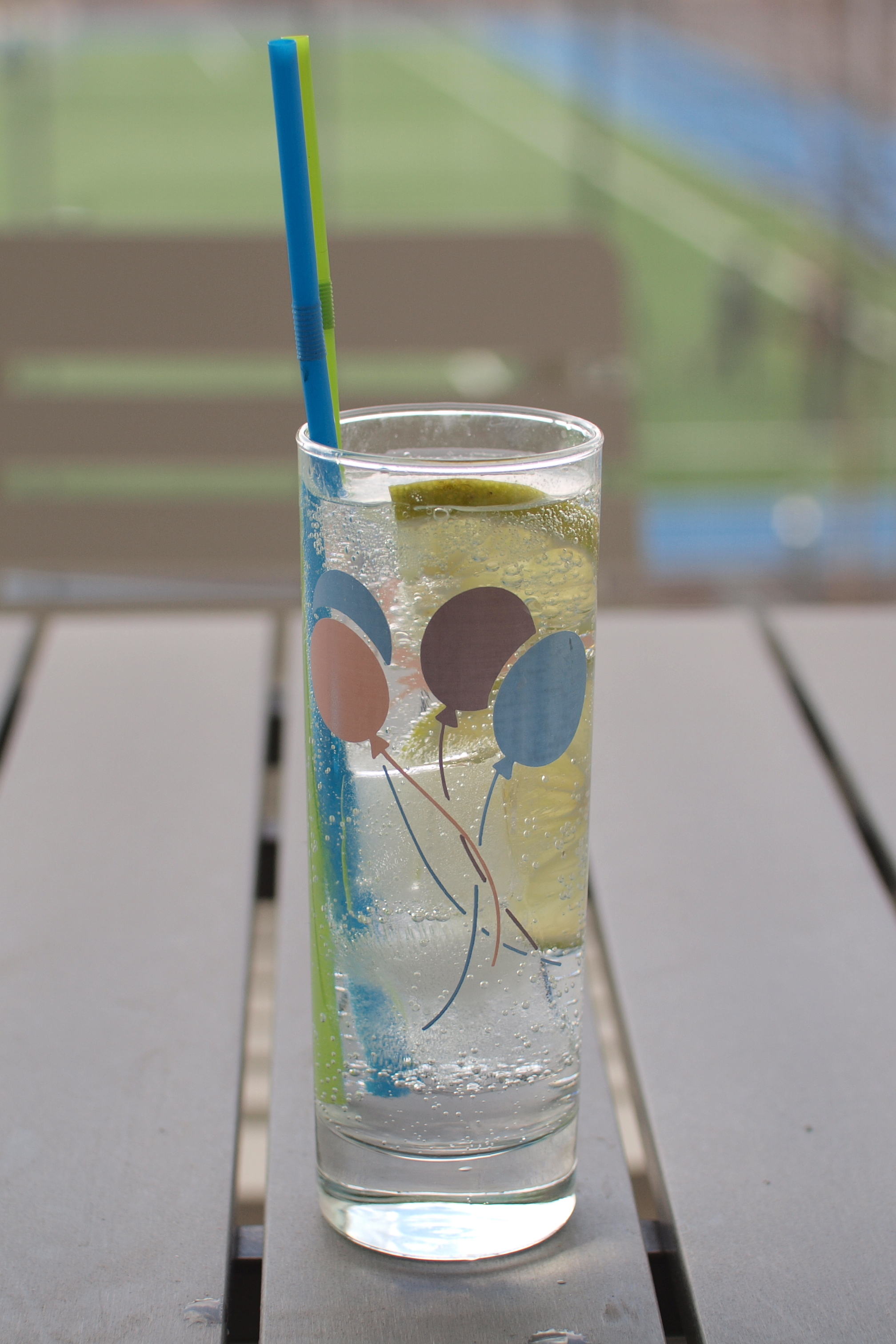
Gin and tonic made with Bombay Sapphire London Dry Gin and Schweppes Indian Tonic, garnished with slices of lime

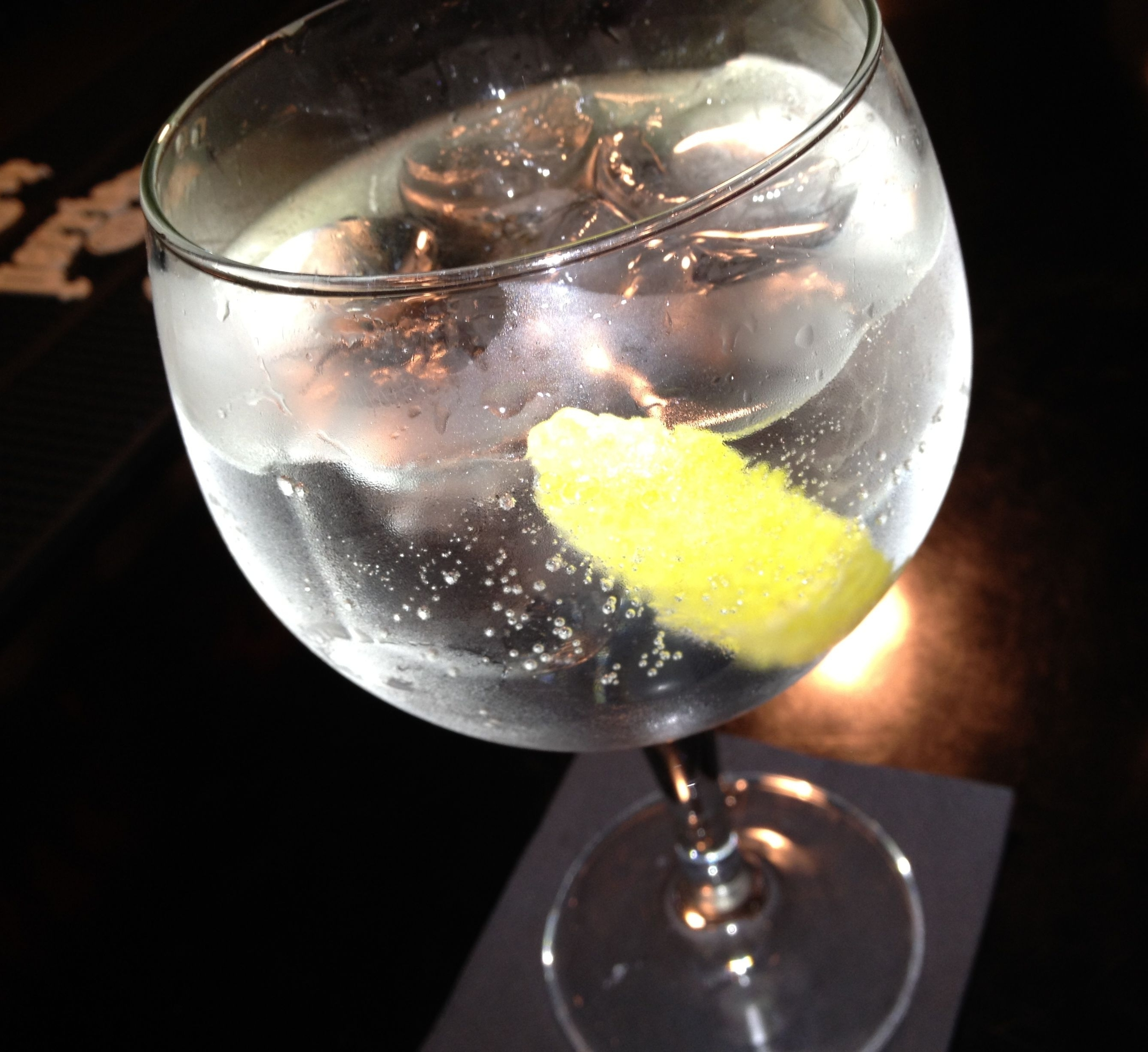
A gin and tonic with ice and lemon wedge

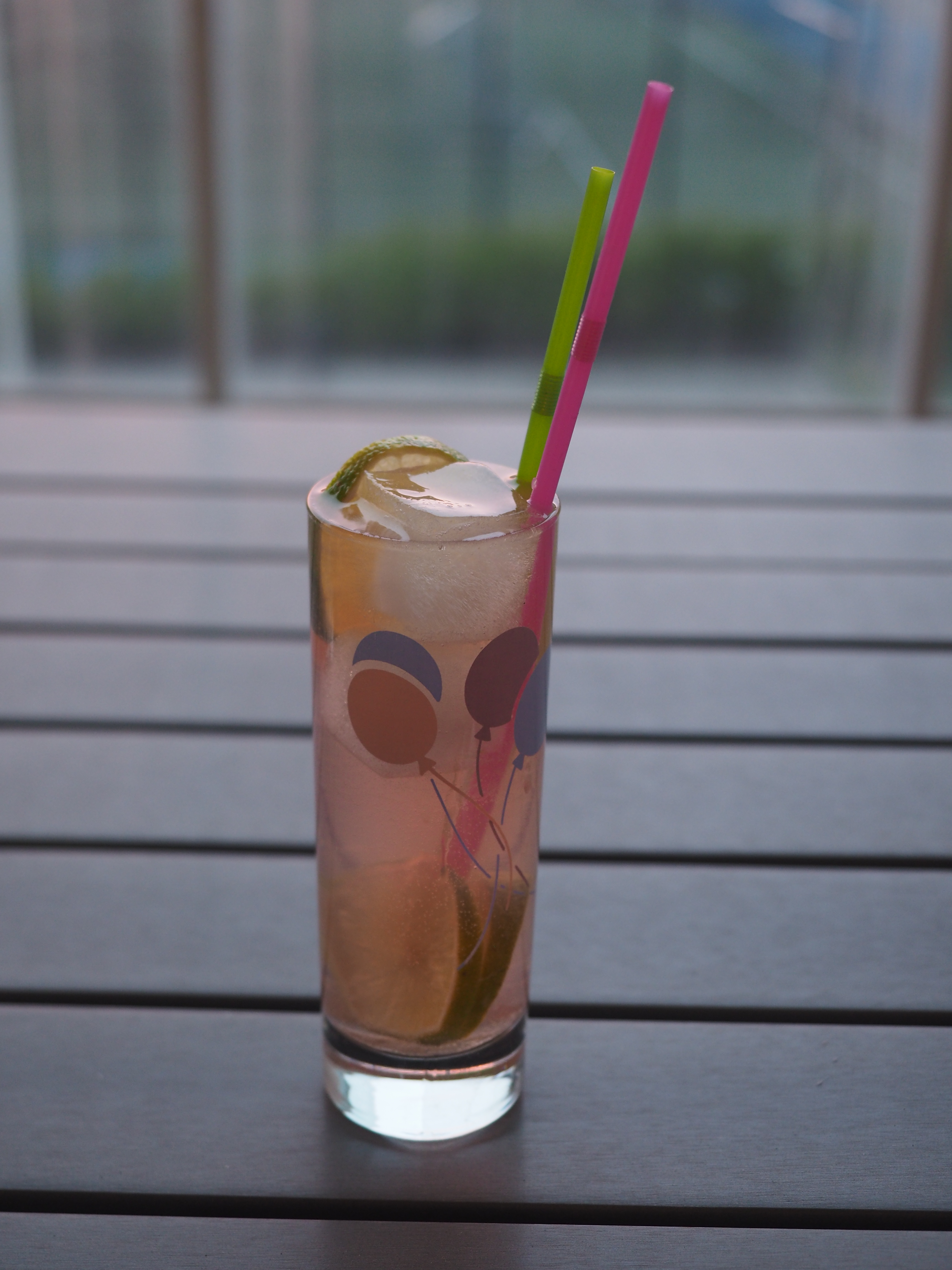
Gin and tonic made from Estonian Crafter's Gin. The botanicals in the gin have turned the drink pink in colour.

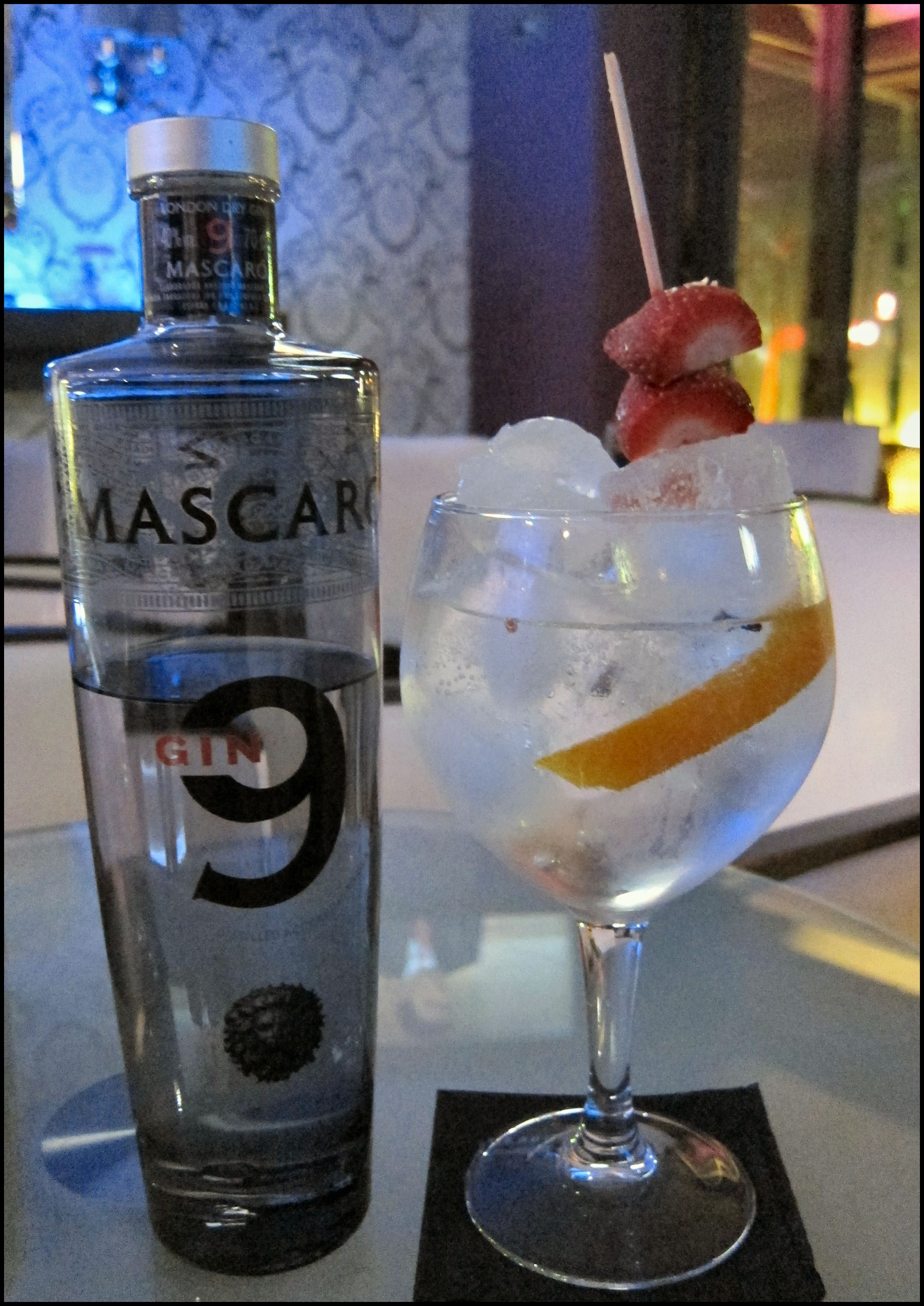
A Spanish gin tonic served in a balloon glass

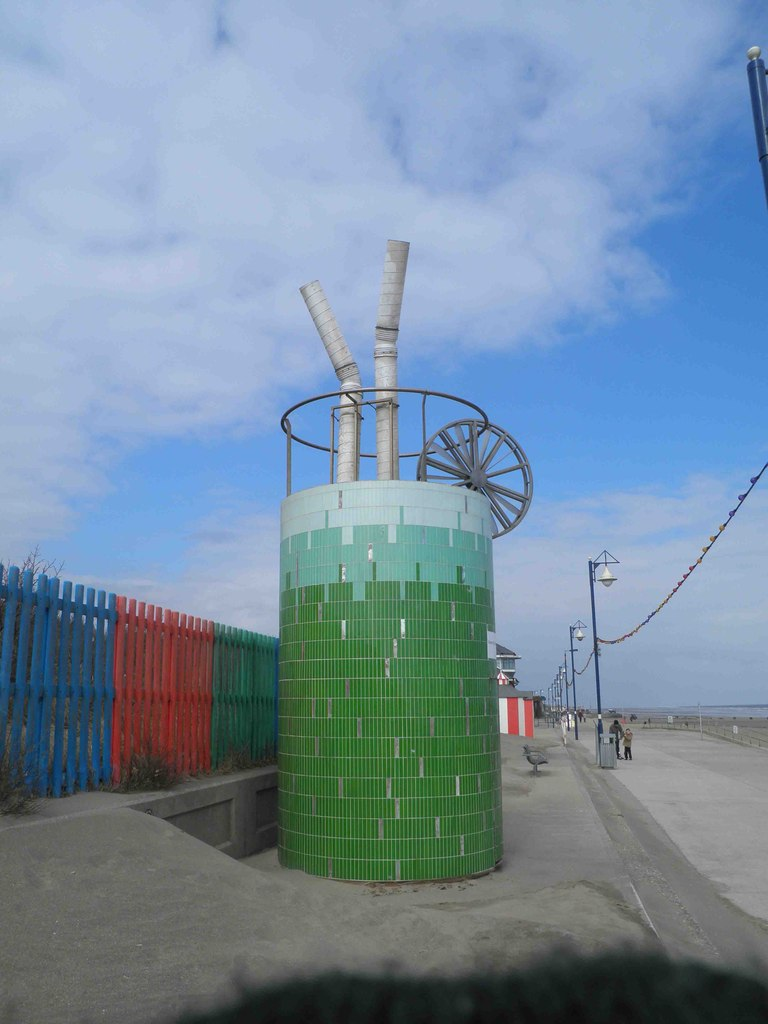
A sculpture of a gin and tonic on the Mablethorpe coastline.

== See also ==
- Dubonnet, another drink invented to encourage European colonial soldiers in tropical climates to take quinine
- Lillet, an aperitif wine
- Pink gin, Plymouth gin mixed with Angostura bitters
- Quinquina, a quinine-containing beverage sometimes used as a mixer with gin
- Beton, a cocktail made by mixing tonic water with Becherovka, a Czech liqueur
