= Rhubarb and Ginger Gin =

Rhubarb and Ginger Gin or Rhubarb Ginger Gin is a sort of infused liquor. It is produced commercially by several companies, but can be made at home by infusing gin with rhubarb. The infused gin can be consumed as is or used as a base for mixed cocktails.

Key ingredients are gin, ginger and rhubarb with the last ingredient turning the whole drink pinkish. Lemon zest and sugar are also typically part of the drink and it is often garnished with lemon.

== Variation ==
Typically rhubarb and ginger gin is topped up with iced water, rarely without water. It is common for rhubarb and ginger gin to be served as 'rhubarb ginger gin and tonic', typically consisting of 2 shots of gin, which is then topped up with tonic water. This is served in a highball glass over ice.

== See also ==
- Gin
