= Royal Club =

Royal Club may refer to:

- Royal Club (esports), Chinese professional League of Legends team
- Royal Club (brand), Dutch brand of soft drinks and juices
