= Bitter lemon =

Soft drink flavor

Schweppes Bitter Lemon. Vintage bottle shown.

Bitter lemon is a bitter lemon flavoured soft drink. Its signature taste is a result of inherently bitter lemon pith being reinforced by the bitter alkaloid quinine.

The principal difference between tonic water and bitter lemon is the lemon juice, pith, and peel. The juice adds sour, offset by additional sweetener, and the oily peel fragrance.

The generic bitter lemon drink dates back to 1834. Schweppes introduced its brand of bitter lemon in 1957.

Bitter lemon is consumed both by itself and as a mixer, and is sold around the world.

== Notable brands ==
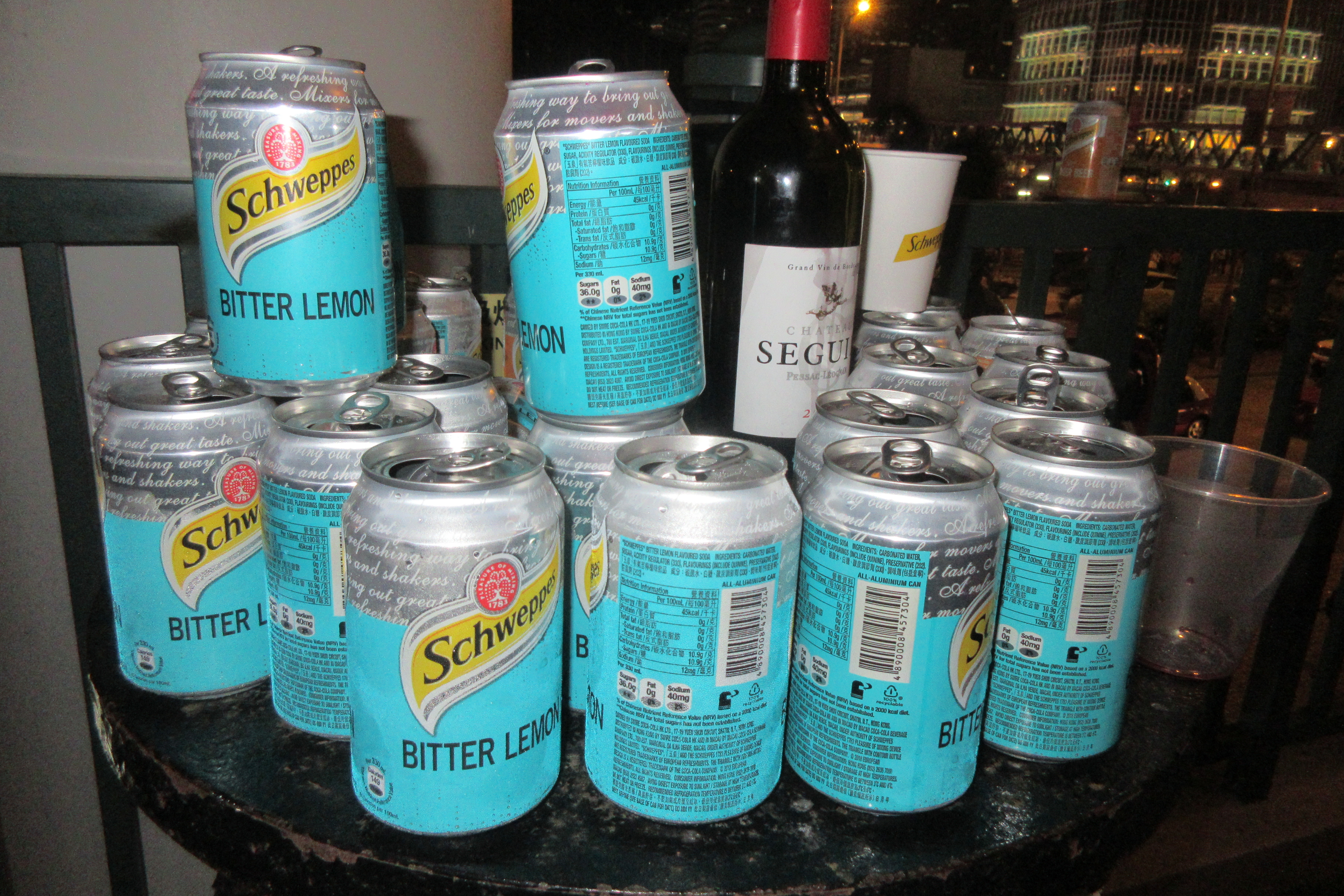
Schweppes cans

- Schweppes
- Fever-Tree
- Canada Dry
- Gini
- Royal Club
- Polar Beverages
- Krest - made by the Tanzanian Coca-Cola subsidiary.

== See also ==
- List of lemon dishes and beverages
