= Fever-Tree =

British maker of drink mixers

Fevertree Drinks plc
- Trade name: Fever-Tree
- Type: Public
- Traded as: LSE: FEVR
- ISIN: GB00BRJ9BJ26
- Industry: Drinks manufacturing
- Founder: Charles Rolls; Tim Warrillow
- Headquarters: Hammersmith, London, England, United Kingdom
- Area served: 74 countries worldwide
- Key people: Bill Ronald (Chairman); Tim Warrillow (Chief executive officer); Andrew Branchflower (Chief financial officer)
- Revenue: ▲£228.5 million (2024)
- Operating income: ▼£72.2 million (2019)
- Net income: ▼£58.8 million (2019)
- Owner: Charles Rolls (7.06%); Tim Warrillow (4.7%)
- Number of employees: ▲176 (2019)
- Website: www.fever-tree.com

Fevertree Drinks plc, known as Fever-Tree, is a British producer of premium drink mixers; it was founded by Charles Rolls and Tim Warrillow in 2004.

== History ==
Fever-Tree was founded by gin industry expert Charles Rolls and advertising executive Tim Warrillow in 2004. The duo shared a desire to create the perfect all-natural tonic water mixer, producing a premium option to standard mixers available on the market without high quantities of preservatives and artificial sweeteners. Following an excursion to the Democratic Republic of the Congo, and several months of development and experimentation with different botanicals, the first product, Fever-Tree Indian Tonic Water, was launched in 2005; their products listed in Selfridges and Waitrose stores.

In 2006, the company received investment from London & Lochside, a venture capitalist.

In 2007, Fever-Tree launched in the United States and Spain. In 2008, the company had listed products with the Sainsbury's and Tesco U.K. supermarkets.

By 2011, Fever-Tree became recognised as one of the fastest growing UK drinks companies by being included in the Sunday Times Fast Track 100 list. Their distribution range had expanded to 25 countries in the same year. This led to growth in foreign sales, with an increase of 94% annually between 2008 and 2010, from £1.1 million to £4.4 million.

In March 2013, the founders sold 25% of the company to Lloyds Development Capital, and London & Lochside exited its holding with the business. In November 2014, the company floated on the London Stock Exchange under the ticker symbol LSE:FEVR; the IPO valued Fever-Tree at £154.4m. As of 2019, its market value had increased elevenfold since its 2014 listing.

Since its initial offering, the company has expanded its product line to include a wider range of mixers including ginger ale, ginger beer, lemonade and flavoured tonic and soda water.

In January 2022, the company launched its product range in South Korea. In September, as part of its expansion in the US, Fever-Tree announced its acquisition of Powell & Mahoney mixers for $5.9 million. Within the same year, Rolls retired from his position as non-executive deputy chairman of Fever-Tree.

In July 2024, Fever-Tree was reported to have sponsored the Republican Party Convention in Wisconsin, United States. However, the company later clarified that it had only supplied free products to the venue, along with many other venues that were existing customers, and that it was not a sponsor of the convention.

== Name origin ==
The company's name comes from its initial product, a tonic water. The tonic is flavoured with quinine, a chemical extracted from the bark of the South American cinchona tree. When introduced to India as a pharmaceutical to aid in reducing the fever associated with malaria, quinine was blended with soda water and sugar to make it more palatable, producing the earliest tonic water. The cinchona tree has been referred to in India as the fever tree.

== Products ==
Based in west London, Fever-Tree makes a variety of beverages, including tonic water, ginger beer and lemonade. As of 2023, Fever-Tree products are exported to and available in over 80 countries.

Products are manufactured in Somerset. The range includes:

- Indian Tonic Water
  - #1 Best Selling and #1 Most Trending Tonic Water by The World's 50 Best Bars Annual Report 2016
- Naturally Light Tonic Water
- Mediterranean Tonic Water
- Elderflower Tonic Water
- Lemon Tonic Water
- Rhubarb and Raspberry Tonic Water
- Aromatic Tonic Water
- Clementine & Cinnamon Tonic Water
- Sicilian Lemon Tonic
- Citrus Tonic Water
- Premium Soda Water
- Sicilian Lemonade
- Madagascan Cola
- Distillers Cola
- Ginger Ale
- Refreshingly Light Ginger Ale
- Spiced Orange Ginger Ale
- Smoky Ginger Ale
- Ginger Beer
- Blood Orange Ginger Beer
- Naturally Light Ginger Beer
- Bitter Lemon
- Sparkling Cucumber
- Sparkling Pink Grapefruit
- Sparkling Lime & Yuzu
- Classic Bloody Mary
- Classic Margarita
- Light Margarita
- Espresso Martini Mix
- Passionfruit Martini Mixer

== Partnerships ==
Fever-Tree has established strategic partnerships with various distilleries and bars in recent years.

In 2013, Fever-Tree began actively supporting the non-profit organisation Malaria No More, a charity dedicated to eliminating malaria.

In 2018, Fever-Tree announced a three-year collaboration with the Lawn Tennis Association, serving as title-sponsor. In addition, in August of the same year, Fever-Tree entered into a distribution agreement with Southern Glazer's Wine & Spirits, the largest distributor of alcoholic beverages in North America. As a result, Fever-Tree secured exclusive on-premise channel distribution in 29 states. The following month, Fever-Tree launched its citrus tonic water partnership with Bacardi's Patrón Tequila.

In 2019, the British coffee chain Caffè Nero partnered with the company to sell two variations of the drink espresso and tonic across its outlets.

In 2022, the leading multi-channel foodservice provider for UAE, Bidfood UAE, became the exclusive distributor of the Fever-Tree products in the United Arab Emirates. In the same year, Fever-Tree sponsored the Time Out Hong Kong Bar Awards.

In 2023, in combination with Chemist Spirits, Fever-Tree opened its first U.S. Rooftop Botanical Bar Experience in North Carolina.

In 2024, it was erroneously reported by the Milwaukee Journal-Sentinel that Fever-Tree had partnered with the Milwaukee Host Committee to raise funding for, and oversee, the Republican Party Convention in Wisconsin. However, the company clarified that it had only supplied free products to the venue, and that it was not a sponsor of the convention.

== Recognition and awards ==
Fever-Tree's drink mixers have won "Outstanding Cold Beverage" in the sofi Awards in 2010, 2011, and 2012.

- 2014 Awarded Best Brand in The Sunday Times Fast Track 100 Fastest Growing Companies.
- 2015 Drinks International Award for bestselling and top trending mixer brand.
- 2016 Drinks International Award for bestselling and top trending mixer brand.
- 2017 Drinks International Award for bestselling and top trending mixer brand.
- 2018 Drinks International Award for bestselling and top trending mixer brand.
- 2019 Queen's Award for Enterprise, an honour given to companies that excel in international trade, innovation, and sustainable development.
- 2019 Drinks International Award for bestselling and top trending mixer brand.
- 2020 Drinks International Award for bestselling and top trending mixer brand.
- 2021 Drinks International Award for bestselling and top trending mixer brand.
- 2022 Drinks International Award for bestselling and top trending mixer brand.
- 2022 The King's Award for Enterprise: International Trade for Outstanding Continuous Growth.
- 2022 Awarded Highly Commended in the 2022 Footprint Drinks Sustainability Awards.
- 2023 Good Housekeeping Institute Award for Best Mediterranean Tonic Water.
