= Sisi (drink) =

Dutch fruit-flavoured beverage

SiSi
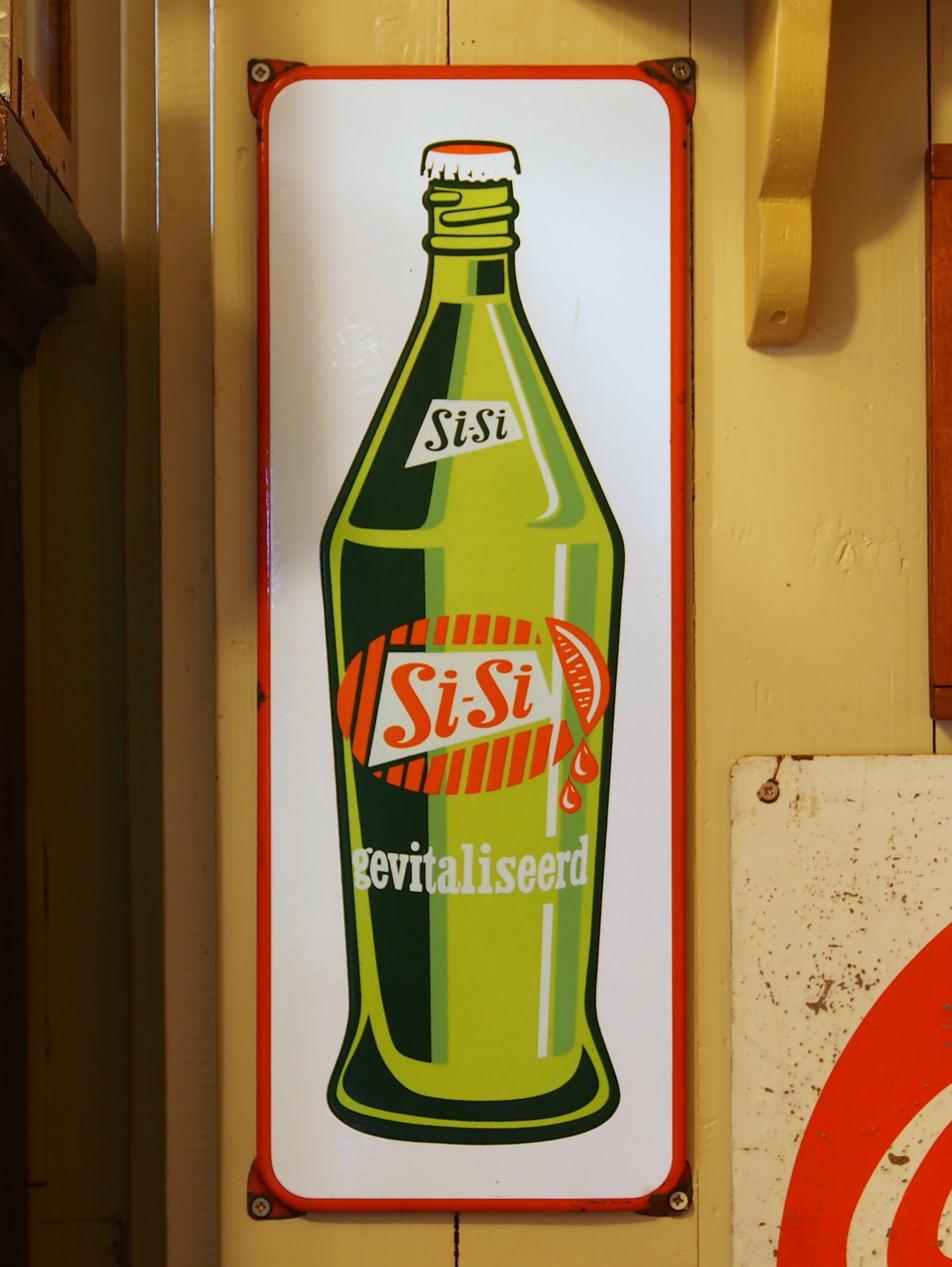
- Enamel advertising sign (photographed at the museum In den Halven Maen)
- Type: Carbonated fruit drink, carbonated beverage, citrus soda
- Manufacturer: Vrumona (joint venture with Heineken International)
- Distributor: Heineken Netherlands
- Origin: Netherlands
- Introduced: 1936 (apple flavour under the brand name si si)
- Color: Depending on the variant
- Flavor: Depending on the variant
- Variants: SiSi Sinas; SiSi No Bubbles Orange; SiSi No Bubbles Mango; SiSi No Bubbles Strawberry; SiSi No Bubbles Action; SiSi Fruit Water Orange; SiSi Fruit Water Strawberry; SiSi Fruit Limo Tropical; SiSi Fruit Limo Orange; SiSi Fruit Limo Strawberry
- Related products: Royal Club (brand)

Sisi (stylized as SiSi; originally si si) is the brand name of a wide range of fruit-flavoured beverages produced by Dutch beverage manufacturing company Vrumona under a joint venture with Heineken International since 1951. The manufacturing plant is located at Bunnik, The Netherlands.

In 1936, George Becht launched a grapefruit-flavoured drink called Ja-Ja. One year later, an apple-flavoured drink was launched under the si si name. After George Becht died in 1949, his son Cornelius took over and adopted the "si si" name to the similar products of the company Vrumona.

Between 1951 and 1969 there were a number of similarly named drinks, including Cas-Si (blackcurrant), Ceri-Se (cherry) and Grapy (grapefruit). In 1969, the name Si si was changed to one word, Sisi. These were later brought under the SiSi name: Cas-Si became SiSi cassis (blackcurrant), Ceri-Se became SiSi Cerise (cherry) and Grapy became Sisi grapefruit. In 1987, these flavours were purchased by another company and relaunched under the name Royal Club.

In 1957, cabaret singer Wim Sonneveld on Radio Luxembourg sung the company's first jingle "ome Daan the Si-Si-liaan". In 1972, and 1973, two well known Dutch actors, John Kraaijkamp sr. and Rijk de Gooijer, acted in some television commercials for the brand. Since the early 1990s, the company has used the slogan "Take it easy, take a SiSi". In recent years, Sisi has touted itself as having half as much sugar as similar products produced by its competitors.
