= Gordon's Gin =

London dry gin

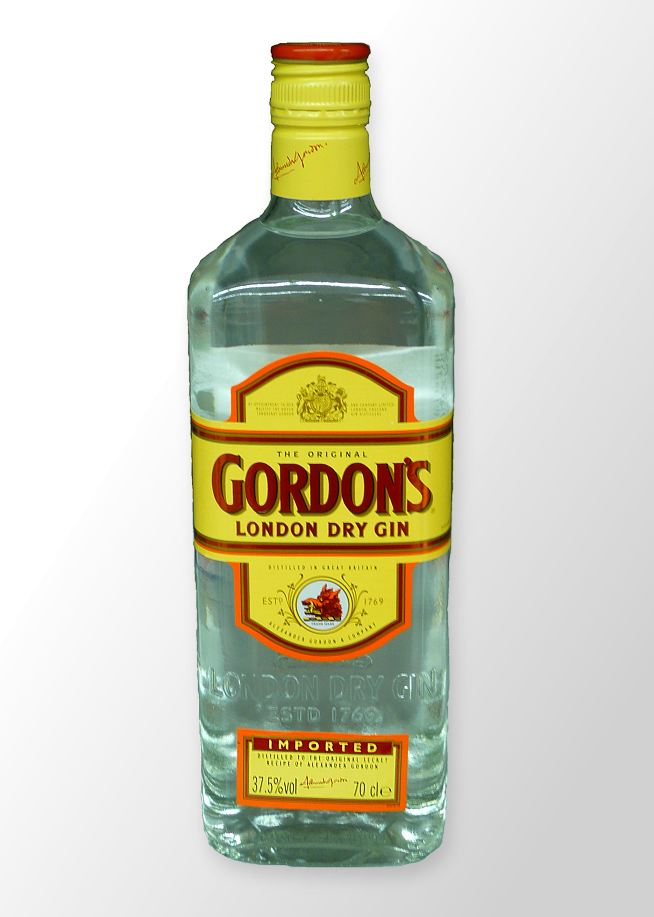
- Bottle of Gordon's Gin
- Type: London dry gin
- Manufacturer: Diageo
- Origin: England
- Introduced: 1769
- Alcohol by volume: 37–47.3%
- Colour: Colourless
- Website: gordonsgin.com

Gordon's is a brand of London dry gin first produced in 1769. The top markets for Gordon's are the United Kingdom, the United States and Greece. It is owned by the British multinational alcoholic beverage company Diageo. According to Diageo, it is the world's best-selling London dry gin. Gordon's has been the UK's number one gin since the late 19th century. A 40% ABV version for the North American market is distilled in Canada.

== History ==
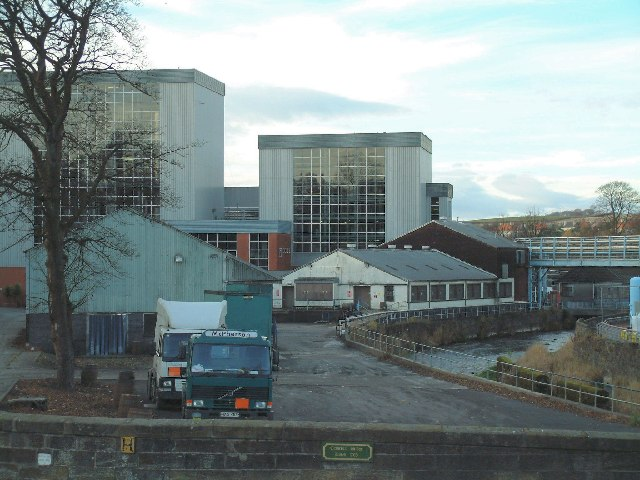
The Cameron Bridge Distillery in Fife, Scotland where Gordon's is produced

Gordon's London Dry Gin was developed by Alexander Gordon, a Londoner of Scots descent. He opened a distillery in the Southwark area in 1769, moving in 1786 to Clerkenwell. The Special London Dry Gin he developed proved successful, and its recipe remains unchanged. Popular with the Royal Navy, bottles of the product were distributed all over the world.

In 1898 Gordon & Co. amalgamated with Charles Tanqueray & Co. to form Tanqueray Gordon & Co. All production moved to the Gordon's Goswell Road site. In 1899, Charles Gordon died, ending the family association with the business.

In 1904 the distinctive square-faced, green bottle for the home market was introduced. In 1906 Gordon's Sloe Gin went into production. The earliest evidence in recipe books for the production of Gordon's Special Old Tom was in 1921.

In 1922 Tanqueray Gordon & Co. was acquired by The Distillers Company. In 1924 Gordon's began production of a 'Ready-to-Serve' Shaker Cocktail range, each in an individual shaker bottle.

In 1925 Gordon's was awarded its first Royal Warrant by King George V. In 1929 Gordon's released an orange gin, and a lemon variety in 1931.

In 1934 Gordon's opened its first distillery in the US, at Linden, New Jersey.

By 1962 it had become the world's highest selling gin.

In 1984 British production was moved to Laindon in Basildon, Essex. In 1998 production was moved to Fife in Scotland, where it remains.

The label and bottle-top of Gordon's gin bears a depiction of a wild boar. According to legend a member of Clan Gordon saved the King of Scotland from a boar while hunting. From the 1940s the label bore the slogan "The Heart of a good Cocktail".

== Products ==
According to its manufacturer, Gordon's gin is triple-distilled and is flavoured with juniper berries, coriander seeds, angelica root, licorice, orris root, orange, and lemon peel; the exact recipe has been a secret since 1769. The recipe differed from others at the time in not requiring the addition of sugar; this made it a "dry" gin.

In the UK Gordon's is sold in a green glass bottle, but in export markets, it is sold in a clear bottle. Some airport duty-free shops sell it in plastic bottles in the 75cl size.

Gordon's is sold in several different strengths depending on the market. In the US, the strength is 40% ABV. Until 1992, the ABV in the UK was 40%, but it was reduced to 37.5% to bring Gordon's gin into line with other white spirits such as white rum and vodka, and to save the manufacturer the cost of excise duty, which is charged by reference to ABV. Other popular brands of gin in the UK, such as Beefeater Gin and Bombay Sapphire, are both 40% ABV in the UK. In continental Europe and in some duty-free stores, a 47.3% ABV version (Traveller's Edition) is available. In New Zealand and Australia, as of 2011, Gordon's is sold at 37% ABV, while in Canada it is 40% ABV and South Africa it is 43% ABV.

In addition to the main product line, Gordon's produces sloe gin; vodka (US & Venezuela only), two alcopop variants, Space and Spark; three vodka liqueur variants, Cranberry, Parchita and Limon (Venezuela only) and a canned, pre-mixed gin and tonic as well as a canned Gordon's and Grapefruit (Russia only, in 500ml).

On 11 February 2013, Gordon's announced the release of Gordon's Crisp Cucumber, blending the original gin with cucumber flavour. In early 2014, Gordon's Elderflower was added to their "flavoured" gin collection, with a natural elderflower flavouring being added to the original recipe.

In August 2017, Gordon's began selling Gordons Pink, a pink-coloured gin flavoured with several types of red berries.

In February 2020, Gordon's launched two new flavours in Sicilian lemon and peach.

In April 2020, it was announced that Gordon's were launching an orange flavoured gin. The two latest additions to their collection of flavoured gin are a tropical passionfruit gin and a morello cherry gin which were released on 15 March 2022.

In 2020 an alcohol free version of Gordon's was launched, it is made with the same botanicals as London Dry gin. In 2022 a 0% pink gin was launched.

=== Discontinued products ===
==== Gins ====
- Gordon's special Old Tom Gin (1921–1987)
- Orange Gin (1929–1988, 2020–)
- Lemon Gin (1931–1988, 2020–)
- Spearmint gin (US only)
- Grapefruit gin (US and Greece)
- Gordon's Distiller's Cut – A "luxury" version of the gin, released in 2004, with additional botanicals of lemongrass and ginger.

==== Shaker cocktails ====
A range of pre-mixed drinks:

- (1924–1967) Fifty-Fifty, Martini, Dry Martini, Perfect, Piccadilly, followed by Manhattan, San Martin, Dry San Martin and Bronx.
- (1930–1967) Rose, Paradise and Gimlet.
- (1924–1990) Dry/Extra Dry Martini

==== Other products ====
- Finest Old Jamaica Rum
- Orange Bitters (made from Seville Oranges)

== In popular culture ==
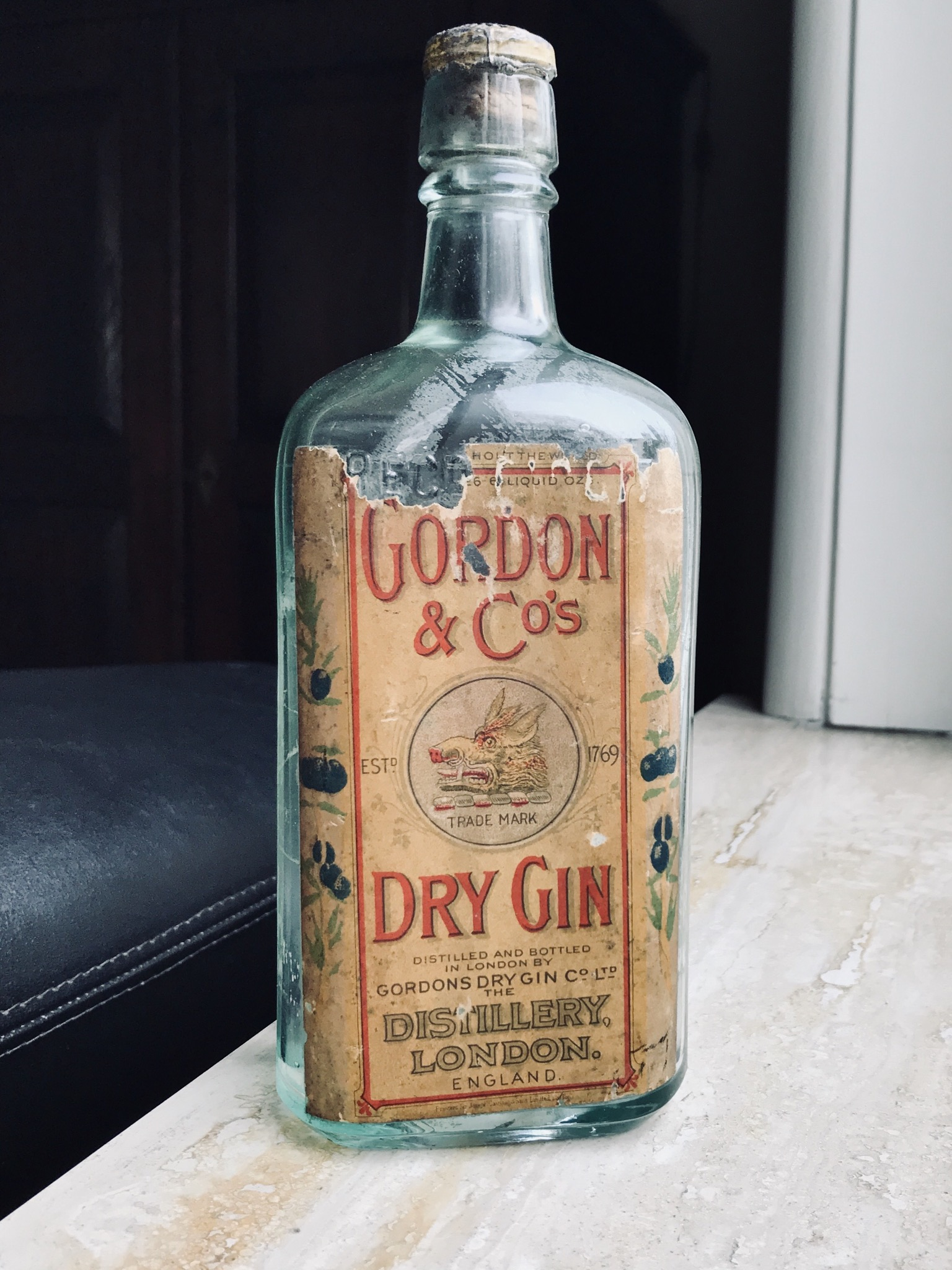
Similar bottle as seen aboard the RMS Titanic

According to an eyewitness account by Jack Thayer, cited in the book A Night to Remember (1955) by Walter Lord, a first-class passenger of the RMS Titanic "drained" a bottle of Gordon's Gin and survived the sinking on 15 April 1912.

Gordon's Gin is specified by name in the recipe for the Vesper Cocktail given by James Bond in Ian Fleming's debut novel Casino Royale (1953).

Gordon's was Ernest Hemingway's favourite gin, which he claimed could "fortify, mollify and cauterize practically all internal and external injuries".

In the adventure film The African Queen (1951), Katharine Hepburn's character pours Humphrey Bogart's entire crate of Gordon's bottles into the river and floats away from the empties.

In the 14th episode of the anime series Transformers: Super-God Masterforce, towards the end of the episode, a hospital patient reveals that he snuck in a bottle of Gordon's Gin and the label was in its export colors.

In the caper film The Sting (1973), Paul Newman's character pretends to drink Gordon's Gin from a bottle surreptitiously filled with water, whilst playing cards with Robert Shaw's character.

In the film noir crime film The Big Heat (1953), Gloria Grahame's character mixes a cocktail with Gordon's Gin.

In Sir Alfred Hitchcock's crime thriller film Blackmail (1929), Anny Ondra's character wanders the streets and sees several neon signs, including two for Gordon's Gin. The first is a two-sided sign on a corner building that has a cocktail shaker pouring into a martini glass flanked by "Gordon's – White for Purity" and "Gordon's London Gin – The Heart of a Good Cocktail". After that, another sign shows a vigorous shaker with "ons" (the "Gord" is off-screen) to its left, "Gin" to its right, "Heart of a" above, and "Good Cocktail" below. The shaker then transforms into a hand holding a dagger that is making a stabbing motion in the same cadence as the shaking container.

In the children's novel Danny, the Champion of the World (1975) by Roald Dahl, the main character and his best school-chum unwittingly catch their headmaster refilling what they'd always thought was a water-glass from a bottle of Gordon's Gin. The two boys privately discuss the matter afterwards, and agree to keep quiet about the man's being an alcoholic, since their headmaster has always been good to them.
