= Charles Rolls (Fever-Tree) =

British businessman

- Born: Charles Timothy Rolls; 1957 (age 68–69); London, England
- Education: Imperial College London; INSEAD

Charles Rolls (born 1957) is a British businessman, and the co-founder and deputy chairman of the drinks brand Fever-Tree.

== Early life ==
Rolls was born in London in 1957.

Rolls earned a bachelor's degree in engineering from Imperial College London, and an MBA from INSEAD.

== Career ==
Rolls worked for the management consultants Bain & Co.

In 1997, Rolls acquired an equity stake in Plymouth Gin, becoming Managing Director. The company was sold to Absolut Vodka in 2001.

In 2005, he co-founded Fever-Tree with Tim Warrillow. They first met in a pub close to London's Sloane Square. From 2005 to 2014, he was CEO of Fever-Tree.

In May 2017, Rolls sold 3.9% of the company for £73 million. In March 2018, he sold 2.6% of the company for £82.5 million. He still owns 8.6% of the company.

== Personal life ==
Rolls is married, with children.

He owns a seafront house in Llafranc on Spain's Costa Brava.
