= Charles Gordon (cricketer, born 1814) =

English cricketer and gin distiller

Personal information
- Full name: Charles Gordon
- Born: 25 December 1814; Finsbury, Middlesex, England
- Died: 27 July 1899 (aged 84); Bedford, Bedfordshire, England
- Batting: Right-handed
- Bowling: Unknown-arm roundarm slow

Domestic team information
- Years: Team
- 1851–1862: Middlesex
- 1852–1862: Marylebone Cricket Club

Career statistics
Competition	First-class
Matches	27
Runs scored	493
Batting average	12.02
100s/50s	–/–
Top score	33*
Balls bowled	20
Wickets	1
Bowling average	?
5 wickets in innings	–
10 wickets in match	–
Best bowling	1/?
Catches/stumpings	13/–
- Source: Cricinfo, 16 August 2019

Charles Gordon (25 December 1814 – 27 July 1899) was an English first-class cricketer and gin distiller. A member of the Gordon family, he ran Gordon's Gin from the 1850s.

The grandson of the Alexander Gordon, the founder of Gordon's Gin, he was born at Finsbury in December 1814. He made his debut in first-class cricket for the Gentlemen of England against the Gentlemen of Kent at Lord's in 1844, with Gordon playing in the return fixture at Canterbury. He played in the same fixture in 1845. By 1850, Gordon was in charge of Gordon's Gin and oversaw its exportation around the British Empire following the lifting of excise tax on exported gin by Parliament. He resumed playing first-class cricket in 1851, when he played for a Marylebone Cricket Club and Metropolitan Clubs team and Middlesex. Gordon played first-class cricket frequently until 1862, having made 27 appearances, sixteen of which came for the Marylebone Cricket Club. He scored a total of 493 runs in his 27 matches at an average of 12.02, with a high score of 33 not out.

Although Gordon's Gin became an extremely successful brand, Gordon was prone to removing money from the company to invest in other ventures and inventions, which were always unsuccessful and led to the business, leaving his sons and daughters to find other means of income. Upon his death at Bedford in July 1897, the family association with the business ended. His grandson was Sir Douglas Gordon, a senior police officer in Bengal Province in British India.
