= Espresso and tonic =

Drink of espresso mixed with tonic water

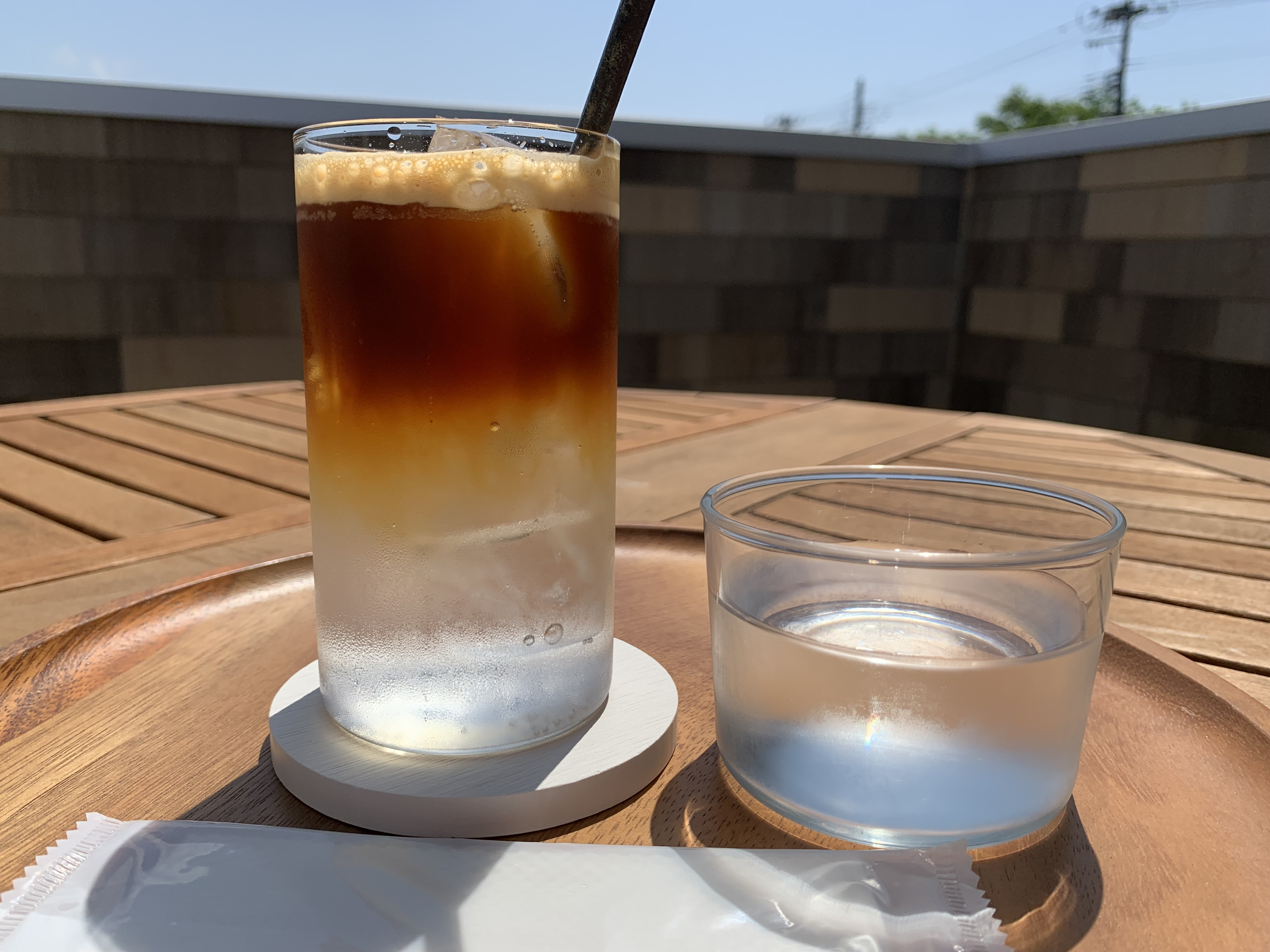
- Espresso and tonic (Japan, 2023)
- Type: Mixed drink
- Ingredients: Espresso; Tonic water

Espresso and tonic or espresso tonic is a non-alcoholic mixed drink made by mixing espresso and tonic water. First recorded in 2007, the drink became popular in Scandinavia before spreading to North America, Japan, and around the world. The key ingredients are espresso and tonic water, but other flavourings may be added.

== History ==
Tonic water was patented in 1858 in London and espresso machines were invented in 1905 in Italy. However, the earliest record of this drink is from 2007 in Oslo. There it was mixed by a barista working with the future founders of the Swedish company Koppi Roasters, Anne Lunell and Charles Nystrand. Later that year, it was featured on the Koppi Roasters menu in Helsingborg as Kaffe & Tonic. Its popularity grew in Scandinavia and by the 2010s, the drink had spread to North American coffee culture as a result of international barista competitions. By 2015, the drink had also spread to Japan. The drink has been associated with "barista fashion" by historian Wendy Pojmann. In 2019, the British coffee chain Caffè Nero partnered with the beverage company Fever-Tree to sell two versions of the drink.

== Presentation ==
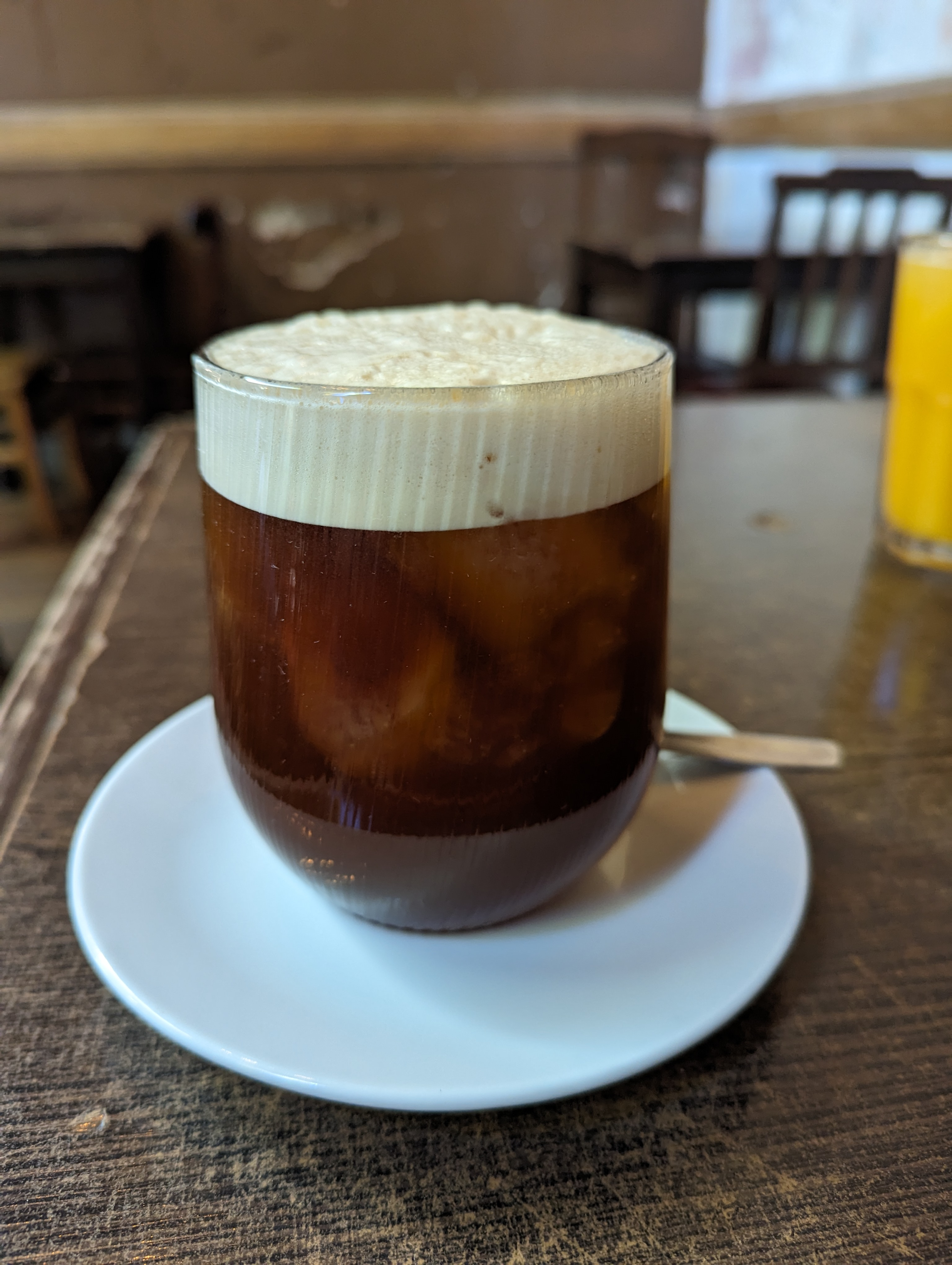
Espresso tonic, with head (Montevideo, 2023)

The drink is traditionally created by pouring espresso over iced tonic water, creating a layered drink. If the tonic is poured onto espresso, a head of foam is created on the drink. The drink can also include sugar syrup, a lemon garnish, or other flavours such as cherry, lime, or honey. It is Japanese baristas who are credited with adding additional flavours to the drink first. Suggestions for serving include using a Collins glass, and with a straw.
