= Tim Warrillow =

British businessman

- Born: 1974 or 1975 (age 50–51); London, England
- Education: Wellington College
- Alma mater: Newcastle University
- Occupation: Businessman
- Known for: co-founder of Fever-Tree
- Title: CEO, Fever-Tree

Timothy Daniel Gray Warrillow (born 1974/1975) is a British businessman, and co-founder and CEO of the drinks brand Fever-Tree.

== Early life ==
Warrillow was born in London, England. He earned a bachelor's degree in business management from Newcastle University.

== Career ==
Warrillow early career was as an advertising executive. In 2003, he co-founded Fever-Tree with Charles Rolls. They first met in a pub close to London's Sloane Square.

== Personal life ==
Warrillow lives in London, England.
