= Viru Valge =

Estonian vodka brand

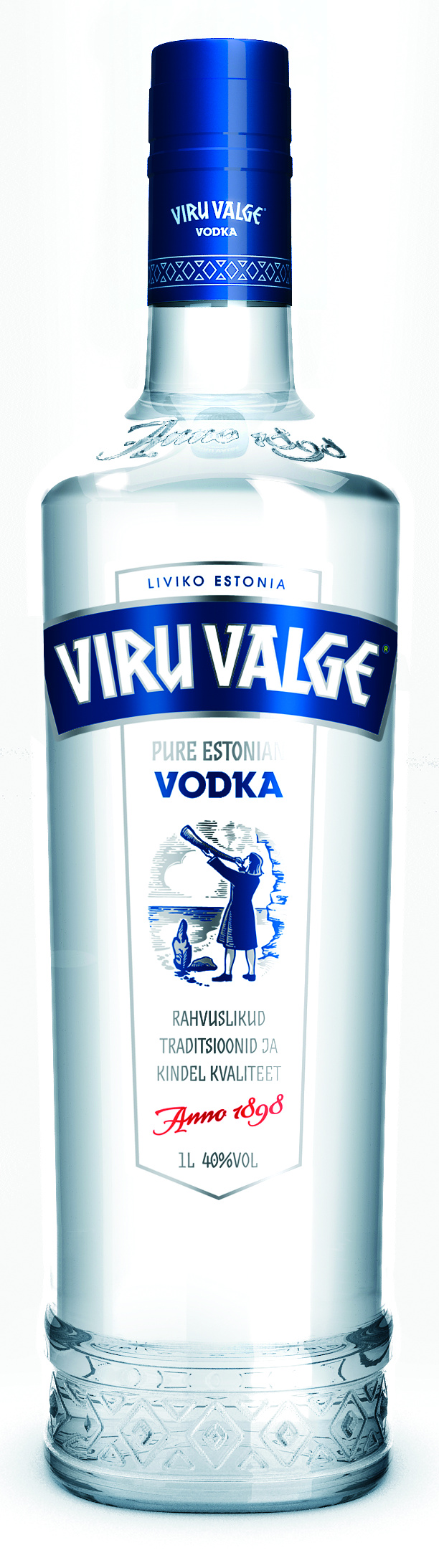
- Type: Vodka
- Manufacturer: Liviko
- Origin: Estonia
- Introduced: 1962
- Alcohol by volume: 38%, 40%, 80%
- Proof (US): 76, 80, 160
- Related products: Vana Tallinn
- Website: www.viruvalge.ee

Viru Valge is a high-quality grain-based Estonian vodka produced by Liviko since 1962, making it the oldest vodka brand in the country. It is produced from Estonian grain and groundwater prepared by coal filtration. The hornblower has been the symbol of Viru Valge since its creation. The Viru Valge bottles are produced in the Järvakandi glass factory, which is located 85 km from Liviko.

== Varieties ==
Viru Valge comes in three degrees of alcohol content: 37.5%, 40%, and 80% vol.

Other varieties:

- Viru Valge Rukkilille peenviin (40% vol)
- Viru Valge Special Anniversary (40% vol)
- Viru Valge Cranberry (37,5% vol)
- Viru Valge Watermelon (37,5% vol)
- Viru Valge Cherry (37,5% vol)
- Viru Valge Green Apple (37,5% vol)
- Viru Valge Vägev (80% vol).

== Awards ==
- The SIP Awards 2016 – silver medal & Consumer’s Choice Award
- The SIP Awards 2015 – gold medal
- The International Wine and Spirits Competition 2014 – gold medal
- The International Wine and Spirit Competition 2013 – silver medal
- The International Wine and Spirit Competition 2010 – silver medal
- The Best Alcoholic Beverage 2010
- Approved Taste 2009
- Approved Estonian Taste 2000
