= Vana Tallinn =

Estonian rum-based liqueur

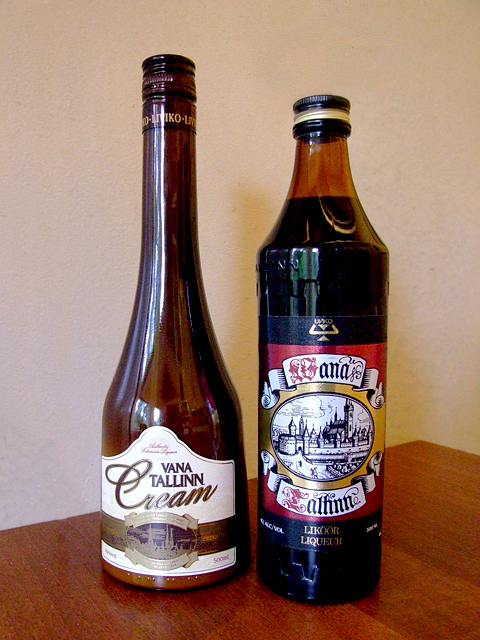
- Two bottles of the Vana Tallinn brand
- Type: Liqueur
- Manufacturer: Liviko
- Origin: Estonia
- Introduced: 1960
- Alcohol by volume: 40%, 45%, 50%
- Proof (US): 80, 90, 100
- Colour: dark brown
- Ingredients: Rum, herbs, oranges, lemons, vanilla pods, and various other spices
- Variants: Vana Tallinn; Vana Tallinn Winter Spice; Vana Tallinn Heritage Edition; Vana Tallinn Cream; Vana Tallinn Ice Cream
- Related products: Viru Valge
- Website: liviko.ee

Vana Tallinn (Literal translation: "Old Tallinn") is an Estonian brand of liqueur manufactured continuously by Liviko since 1960. The recipe contains Jamaican rum and a variety of herbs and spices.

Vana Tallinn is typically served on the rocks but may also be used for cocktails, food, coffee or mulled wine.

== History ==
The recipe for Vana Tallinn (45% vol) was invented in 1960 by master distiller Ilse Maar, bottling manager Bernhard Jürno, and distillery specialist Jaan Siimo. Vana Tallinn (45% vol) was the only drink in the Vana Tallinn product family until 1999, when liqueurs with an alcohol content of 40% and 50% vol were added. More than 115 million bottles of Vana Tallinn liqueur have been sold since production began in 1960.

As of 2022, Vana Tallinn liqueur is sold in 60 countries worldwide. In 2018 Liviko announced they started to export Vana Tallinn to Spain, and in 2019 to India.

== Products ==
Vana Tallinn liqueurs:

- Vana Tallinn 40% (80 proof)
- Vana Tallinn 45% (90 proof)
- Vana Tallinn 50% (100 proof)

Vana Tallinn Cream liqueurs:

- Vana Tallinn Original Cream
- Vana Tallinn Chocolate Cream
- Vana Tallinn Ice Cream
- Vana Tallinn Marzipan Cream
- Vana Tallinn Coconut

Other variants:

- Vana Tallinn Glögi (glogg)
- Vana Tallinn Winter Spice (35% or 70 proof) - this liqueur has been produced since November 2012. It is based on Vana Tallinn liqueur with the addition of cinnamon, cardamom, anise and nutmeg.
- Vana Tallinn Heritage Edition (40% or 80 proof)
- Vana Tallinn Wild Spices – contains more spices than classic Vana Tallinn: a blend of peppers, star anise, and ginger has been added. Produced since 2018.
- Vana Tallinn Signature
- Vana Tallinn Elegance – ultra premium class liqueur that sees the original Vana Tallinn recipe blended with select rum aged in oak casks from Martinique.
- Vana Tallinn Coffee Fusion
- Vana Tallinn Dark Liquorice
- Vana Tallinn Spritz - carbonated cocktail drink, low-alcohol beverage that combines the flavour nuances of the classic Vana Tallinn, lemon and sparkling water.

== Vana Tallinn Grand Prix ==
The Vana Tallinn Baltic Sommelier Grand Prix is an annual sommelier competition that finds the best sommelier in the Baltic States (Estonia, Latvia and Lithuania). The competition was named after Vana Tallinn. Sommelier competition has been organized since 2006 by Liviko in cooperation with the Sommelier Associations of Estonia, Latvia and Lithuania. Finalists of the competition undertake a series of skill tests including blind tasting, decanting, serving wine, food matching and correcting mistakes on a wine list.

== Awards ==
- The Spirits International Prestige 2010 – 1st place
- The International Wine and Spirit Competition 2010 – 1st place
- The best alcoholic beverage of Estonia 2011 – Vana Tallinn Heritage
- The best alcoholic beverage of Estonia 2013 – Vana Tallinn Winter Spice
- The best alcoholic beverage of Estonia 2014 – Vana Tallinn Signature
- The International Wine and Spirit Competition 2014 – 2nd place, Vana Tallinn Signature
- The Spirits International Prestige 2015 – 1st place
- IWSC 2015 Silver – Vana Tallinn 40
- The Spirits International Prestige 2017 – 1st place, Vana Tallinn 40
- The International Wine and Spirit Competition 2017 – 2nd place, Vana Tallinn 40
- Consumers’ Choice Award SIP – 2017, Vana Tallinn 40
- The International Wine and Spirit Competition 2017 – 1st place, Vana Tallinn Elegance
- Estonia’s best alcoholic drink 2019 - Vana Tallinn Wild Spices
