= Liviko =

Estonian alcoholic drink company

Liviko logo

Liviko is an Estonian distillery, Baltic distributor and one of the largest alcohol companies in the Baltics. Liviko was established in 1898. Liviko has its production and head office in Estonia along with distribution offices in Riga, Latvia, and Vilnius, Lithuania. Liviko exports its own products to 60 markets. The company's most well-known brands are Viru Valge vodka, Vana Tallinn liqueur, Crafter’s London Dry Gin and Crafter's Aromatic Flower Gin. Liviko produces more than 70 alcoholic and non-alcoholic beverages.

Liviko represents a number of producers in its home markets, including Brown-Forman, Rémy Cointreau, Bacardi, Fentimans and a number of well-known wine brands such as Hardy's, Louis Jadot, Marques de Caceres, Saint Clair, Rocca delle Macie, Carmen, Marani and Canti.

The company's turnover in 2019 was 137 million €. The Liviko group employs more than 270 people.

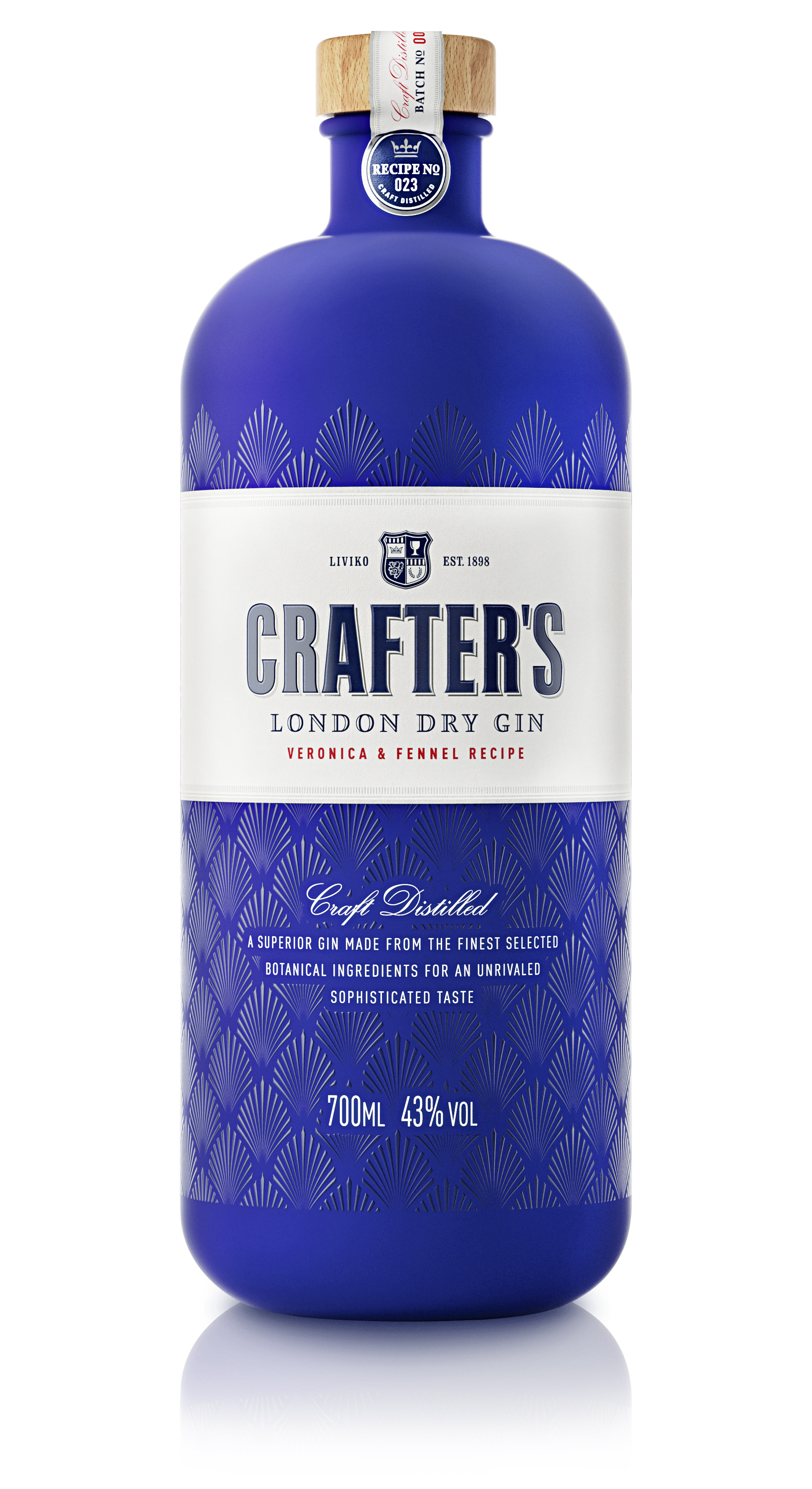
Crafter's London Dry gin

Approximately one-third of Liviko's production is marketed on export markets worldwide. Liviko's 100% shareholder is NG Investeeringud OÜ, an Estonian investment company. NG Investeeringud has major ownership in several companies in the fields of industry, retail trade and real estate management.

== Distillery tour ==
To mark its 120th anniversary, Liviko launched excursions around its production facilities for visitors who register in advance. Each tour comprises three parts: a walk around the production facilities to see the production from selecting the raw ingredients to bottling the finished products; a visit to the interactive museum; and the chance to take part in a tasting or drinks lesson in Estonia's most modern bartender training class, LAB (the Liviko Academy of Beverages).

== Vana Tallinn Baltic Sommelier Grand Prix ==
Sommelier competition Vana Tallinn Baltic Sommelier Grand Prix has been organized since 2006 AS Liviko in cooperation with the Sommelier Associations of Estonia, Latvia and Lithuania. The competition for the best sommelier in the Baltics was named after Liviko’s Vana Tallinn liqueur. The competition has a mixture of theoretical and practical examinations.

== History ==
On 25 September 1898, the cornerstone was laid for the state vodka warehouse Kroonu Viinaladu No. 1, which marked the beginning of the history of Liviko. The main building of the company, which houses Liviko's production facility to this day, was constructed in 1898–1900. The architect was Rudolf Otto von Knüpffer. It was built from limestone and decorated with neo-Romanesque elements.

The oldest drink in Liviko's product portfolio is the crystal liqueur Kännu Kukk, which has been manufactured using a heated bottling process since 1900.

- 1960 – Liviko started to produce Vana Tallinn liqueur that became one of Estonia's hallmark products immediately after its creation.
- 1995 – Liviko became a public limited company, and a year later, a joint stock company, AS Liviko.
- 1998 – Liviko was the first company in the Estonian food industry to be awarded the ISO 9001 quality certification.
- 2000 – Liviko was acquired by NG Investeeringud.
- 2008 – Liviko acquired subsidiaries in Latvia and Lithuania.
- 2015 – Liviko launched Crafter's London Dry Gin and in 2017, launched Crafter's Aromatic Flower Gin.
- 2018 – Liviko launched excursions around its production facilities for visitors who register in advance.
- 2019 – Liviko launched Re-crafted Crafter's drink series according to the zero waste principle, and established a new category in the global beverage industry: Junibeer, which is a juniper berry beer.
- 2019 – Liviko launched Bellingshausen Vodka dedicated to Admiral Bellingshausen and his extraordinary story of discovering the Antarctica. The vodka was released to commemorate the 200th anniversary of the discovery of the continent of Antarctica by Admiral Bellingshausen.
