= Royal Club (brand) =

Dutch brand of soft drinks and juices

- The Royal Club logo
- Product type: Soft drink brand
- Current owner: Heineken International
- Country: Netherlands
- Website: www.royalclub.nl

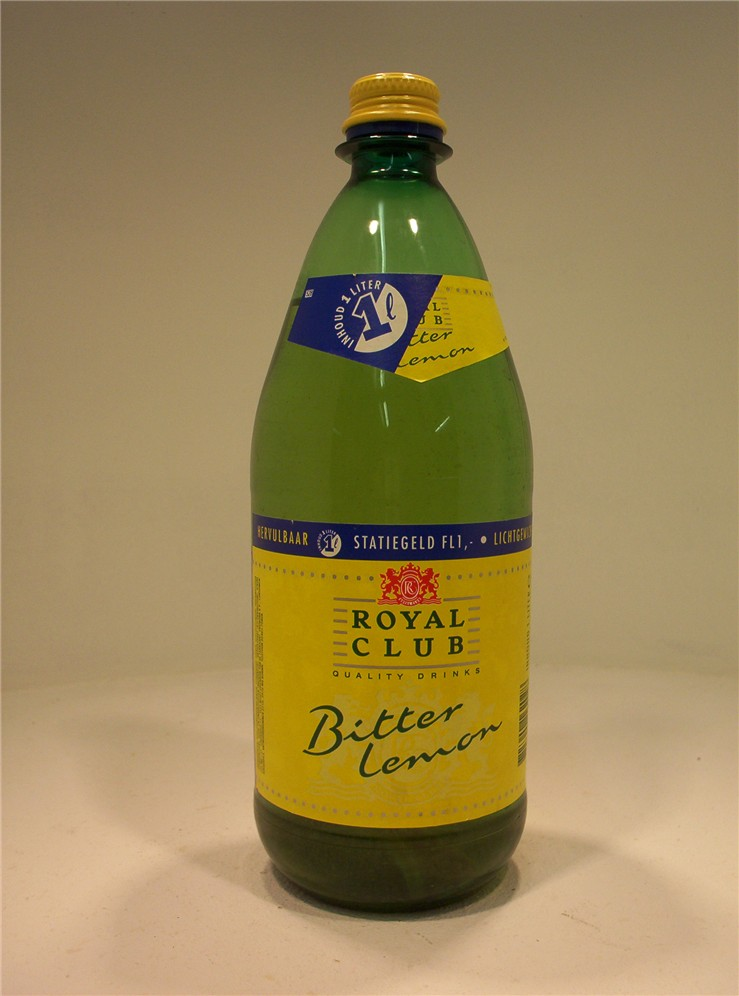
1 liter refillable PET bottle Royal Club bitter lemon, 1994

Royal Club is a Dutch brand of soft drinks and juices, mainly targeted at adult consumers. In commercials Royal Club products are presented as "drinks with a bite" for people with distinct preferences.

== Tims ==
The brand was originally owned by N.V. Handelsmaatschappij v/h J.C. Tims (Rotterdam). Tims produced three different flavours under the brand name Royal Club: tonic water, ginger ale and soda water. It is not clear when Tims started producing these soft drinks. In a 1953 advertisement Tims claimed the brand name had been in use since 1912 by Josiah Russell & Co., an English owned soft drinks company in Rotterdam-Hillegersberg. The latter company was officially taken over by Tims in 1949. Josiah Russell & Co. had a pre-war product called Club Tonic. It therefore seems plausible that the prefix 'Royal' was introduced by Tims in 1949 or shortly thereafter.

== Vrumona ==
In 1969 Tims was taken over by the much larger Heineken-owned soft drink company Vrumona. Vrumona soon decided to extend the Royal Club product line. In 1971 three fruit based bitter soft drinks were added to the product line. One of these flavours, Royal Club bitter lemon, proved to be a big hit while the other two (bitter orange and bitter soda) were quickly discarded. Another hugely successful soft drink launched under the Royal Club brand name was shandy (1976). This product was aimed at responsible drivers who wished to abstain from drinking beer but fancied something with a beerlike taste. At that time alcoholfree beers were hardly available in the Netherlands. In the late 1970s Royal Club Shandy was also a favourite drink among kids who were not yet allowed to drink beer. Royal Club Shandy is still being produced today, though its alcohol content (0.5%) is half of what it used to be (originally 0,9%, later 1%). In 2020 the Royal Club product line was extended with a ginger beer, that has a slightly cloudy appearance and a spicier flavour than Royal Club ginger ale.

== Juices ==
In 1987 the brand name Royal Club was also attached to a product line of juices, previously marketed by Vrumona under the brand name B3. In 2001 Vrumona had to recall all 1 liter glass bottles Royal Club Fruits de Pays orange juice. These bottles contained too much yeast, thereby enhancing the risk of explosion.

== Since 1939 ==
On its website Vrumona claims that the Royal Club brand was launched in 1939. In recent years the phrase "since 1939" has also appeared on all Royal Club labels, cans, packaging and display materials. In 2018 even a line of "natural sodas" in one-way single serve bottles was introduced under the name Royal Club 1939, with the year typefaced most boldly on the labels. This claim for 1939 is derived from the Benelux Trade Marks Register which states that the word brand Royal Club was registered in 1939. There has however never been presented any factual of physical proof (in the form of bottle labels, crown corks, advertisements, etc.) of pre-war Dutch soft drinks under the brand name Royal Club.
