= Crafter's =

Nordic alcoholic beverage brand

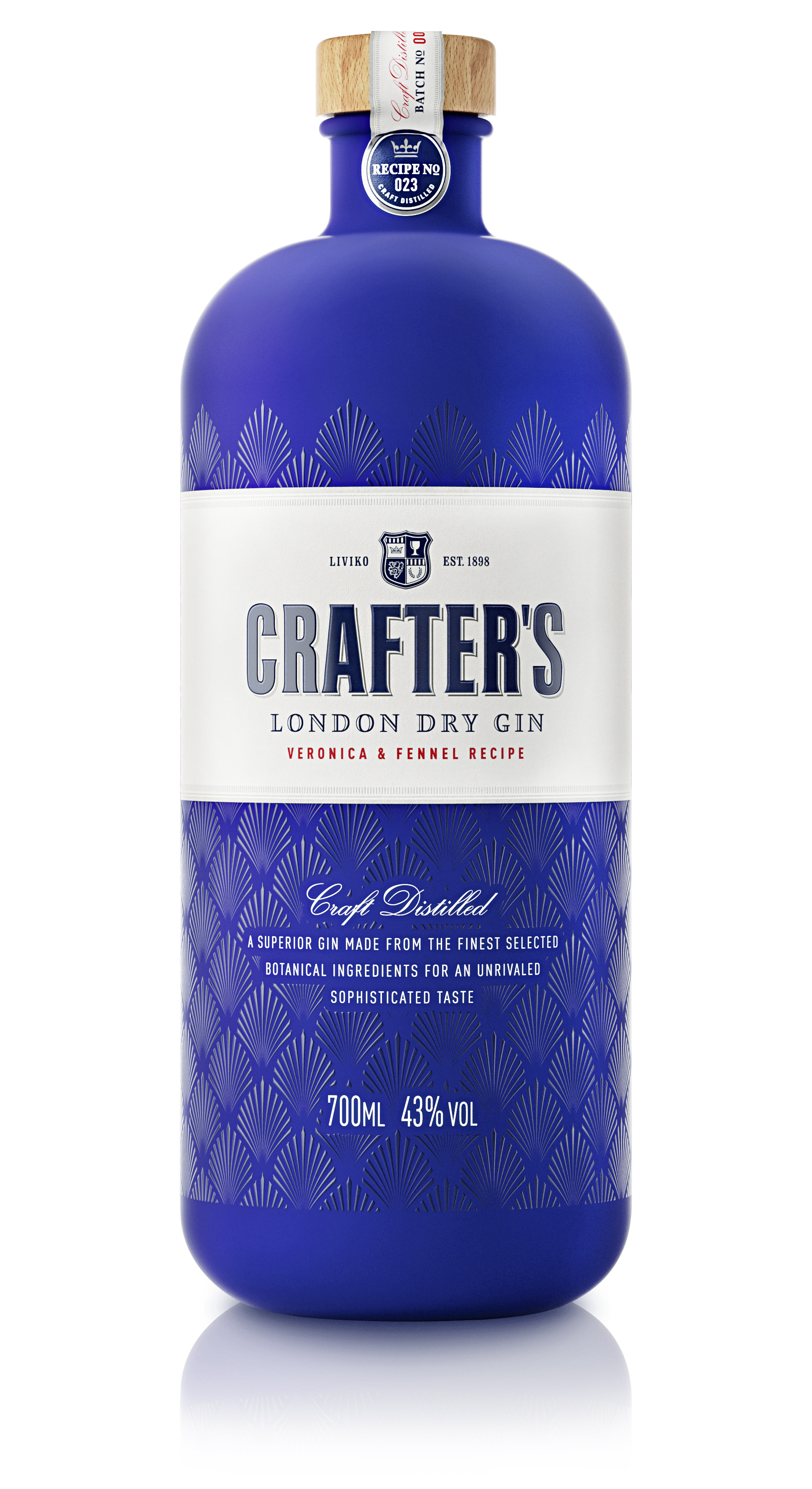
Crafter's London Dry Gin

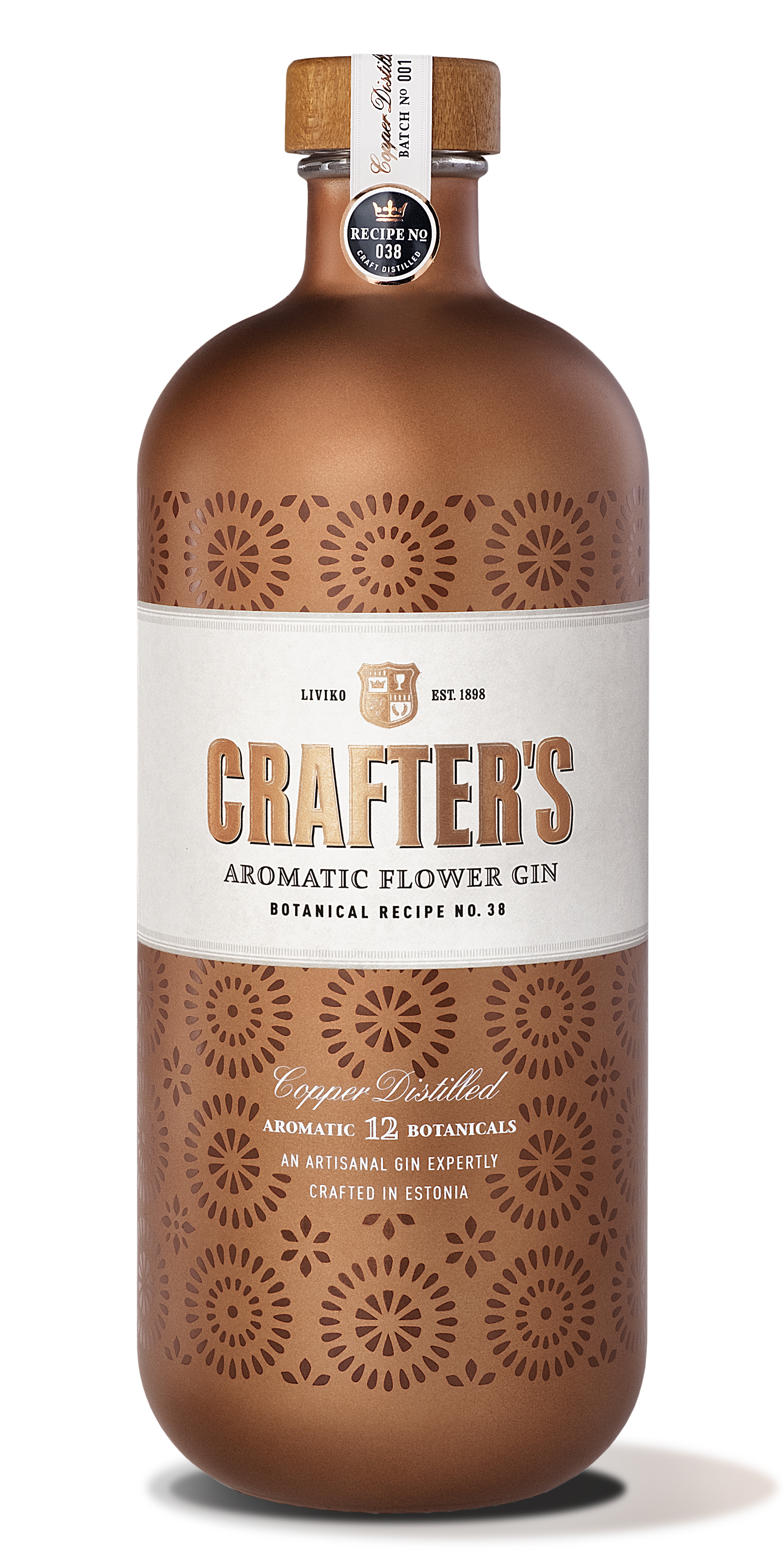
Colour changing Crafters Aromatic Flower Gin

Crafter's is a Nordic gin brand that includes classic London Dry Gin and Aromatic Flower Gin produced by Estonian distillery Liviko. Both gins are handcrafted in Estonia, copper-pot distilled and made in small batches. In 2018 Liviko exported Crafter's gin to 25 countries. The juniper berries used in the making of Crafter's gin are reused in the Re-crafted Crafter's handcrafted beverages, as the berries retain a valuable part of their flavour even after distillation. Liviko was nominated to World Beverage Innovation Award in 2019 for its zero-waste product innovation that lead to a new category of drinks.

== Products ==
=== London Dry gin ===
Classic dry gin Crafter's London Dry Gin was launched in 2015. Its recipe, known as Recipe No. 23, is declared on the bottle and includes veronica and fennel seeds. The character of Crafter's London Dry gin comes from veronica, a herb picked from the wilderness of Estonia, which together with juniper berries and fennel seeds forms a fresh and lively bouquet of flavours.

=== Colour changing gin ===
Crafter's Aromatic Flower Gin has a colour changing effect: the infusion of rosehip petals contains a natural pigment that gives the gin a copper colour. When mixed with tonic, the drink turns light pink due to the acidity of the tonic. The colour change is all natural thanks to rose hip flower pigments. Aromatic Flower Gin is a blend of 12 aromatic botanicals, the ingredients are inspired by the Nordic nature. The main aromatic botanicals are rosehip, rose petals, meadowsweet, chamomile, elderflower and lavender. Crafter's Aromatic Flower Gin was first showcased at TFWA World Exhibition 2017.

==== Distillation ====
London Dry Gin has No. 23 and Aromatic Flower Gin No. 38 on the bottle – to mark the number of recipes tested before production. Crafter's gins are distilled using the herb-based pot still method to achieve a rich soft taste. This distillation method has been used at Liviko since the beginning of the last century. Liviko started manufacturing Crafter's London Dry Gin in 2015 and Crafter's Aromatic Flower Gin in 2017. Crafter's was the official gin at The Scene at the TFWA World Exhibition in Cannes, in 2018.

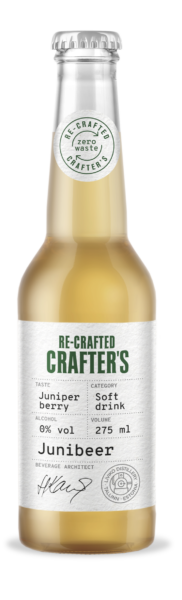
Re-crafted Crafter's has been created following the principle of zero-waste production.

=== Re-crafted Crafter’s Junibeer ===
Soft drink Re-crafted Crafter's Junibeer is made from the juniper berries once used for Crafter's gin making. Juniper berries once used in gin distillation are simply reused – the extract left from the process (with added sugar and water) – and carbonizes them for a refreshing fizzy drink. There are two variants available alcohol-free and 3,2%. Crafter's Junibeer contain no artificial flavoring and are both gluten-free and lactose-free and also suitable for vegans.

== Awards ==
Crafter's London Dry Gin:

- Frontier Awards 2020 – gold medal
- IWSC (International Wine & Spirit Competition) 2017 – silver medal in the London Dry Gin category
- IWSC (International Wine & Spirit Competition) 2017 – bronze medal in the Gin and Tonic sub-competition
- SIP Awards (The Spirits International Prestige) 2017 – gold medal
- SIP Awards (The Spirits International Prestige) 2016 – gold medal
- SIP Awards (The Spirits International Prestige) 2016 – silver medal in the Design category
- The Estonian advertising festival Golden Egg – Best Packaging 2016
- The Best Estonian Alcoholic Beverage in 2016

Crafter's Aromatic Flower Gin:

- International Wine & Spirit Competition 2018
- The Best Estonian Alcoholic Beverage in 2018

Re-crafted Crafter’s Junibeer:

- The Best Estonian Non-alcoholic Beverage 2020 – gold medal
- The Best Estonian Food Product 2020 – bronze medal in the Merchants’ Favourite category
- World Beverage Innovation Award 2019 – nomination (Best beverage concept)
