= Lemon sour =

Type of soda drink

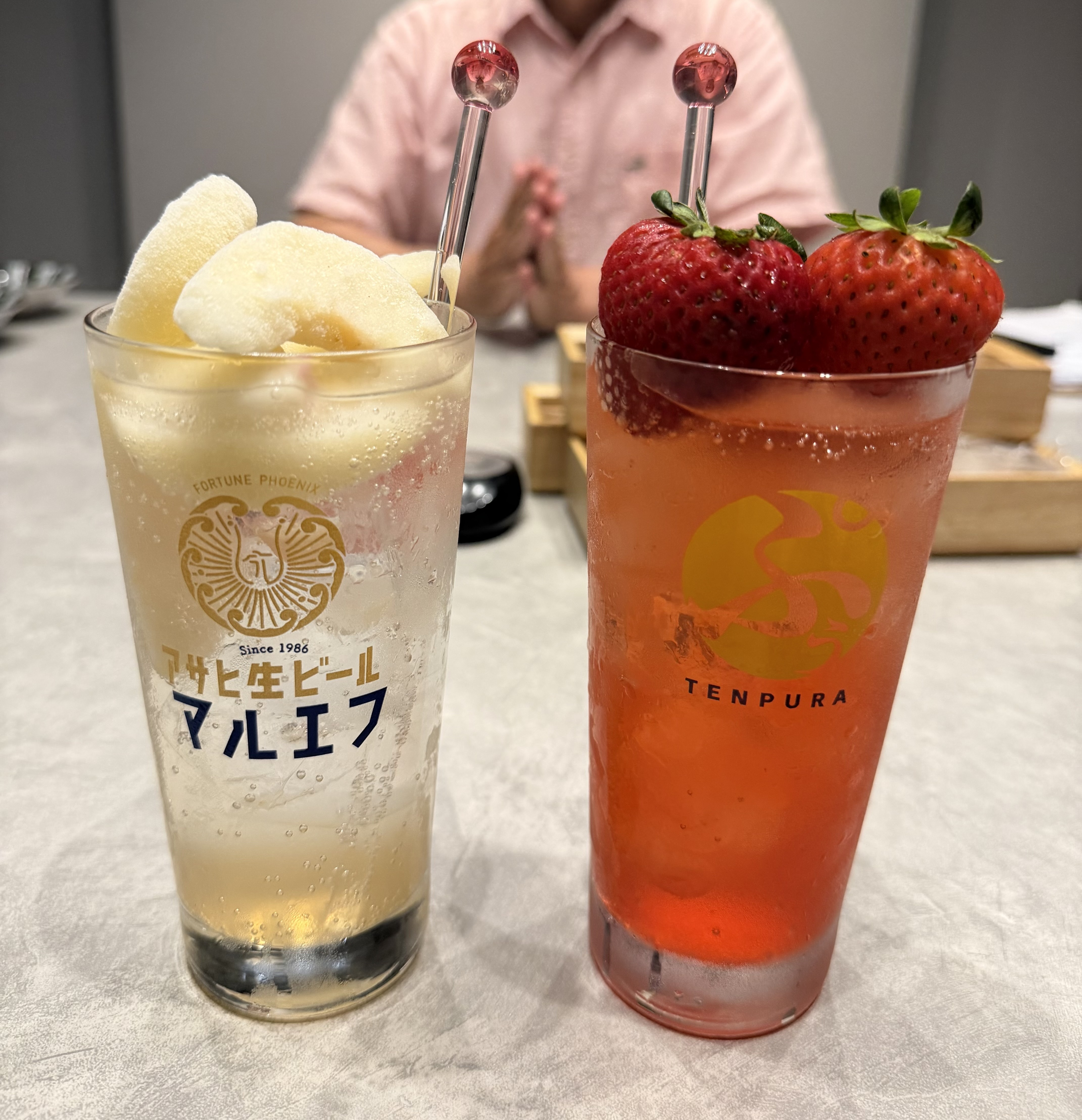
White peach and strawberry versions of a lemon sour made in Kyoto, Japan

Lemon sour is a type of soda made by various vendors, often used in many mixed drinks. There are also alcoholic variants sold in Japan.

The Schweppes brand of lemon sour is sold by Coca-Cola. Canada Dry's lemon sour was sold by Dr Pepper/Seven Up.

Lemon sour is also a popular soda in Japan, where is it sold as an alcopop by Suntory (Kodawari Sakaba no Lemon Sour) and Coca-Cola (Lemon-dou).

== In popular culture ==
Lemon sour was referenced in the 88rising album "Head in the Clouds", specifically in the song Japan 88, featuring Famous Dex, Keith Ape and the one who mentioned it, Verbal.

== See also ==
- Sour (cocktail) – a type of cocktail that often includes lemon
