= Drink mixer =

Non-alcoholic liquid ingredient in mixed drinks

Drink mixers are the non-alcoholic ingredients in mixed drinks and cocktails. Mixers dilute and supplement the alcoholic base of a drink, lowering the alcohol by volume while adding a new flavor or mouthfeel. A sweet juice or syrup, for example, might mask the bitterness of an alcohol-forward spirit, while a neutrally-flavored soda can add carbonation without changing the taste. Some mixers may be used strictly for decorative purposes by changing the color or appearance of the drink. They may also simply increase the volume of a drink, to make it last longer.

== Caffeinated beverages ==
Caffeine, a stimulant, masks some of the depressant effects of alcohol.

- Coffee
- Energy drinks – Red Bull, etc.
- Iced tea, sweetened – Lipton BRISK, Nestea, etc.

== Carbonated mixers and sodas ==
A glass of sparkling water

Carbonation adds a festive flair to drinks. It also increases the absorption of the alcohol into the blood stream due to increased pressure in the stomach, potentially resulting in faster intoxication.

- Bitter lemon – flavored with quinine and lemon (both juice and pith)
- Carbonated water (also called club soda, soda water, seltzer water, or sparkling water)
- Cola – Coca-Cola, Pepsi, etc.
- Ginger ale
- Ginger beer
- Hoppy
- Lemon Sour
- Squirt (soft drink)
- Lemon–lime soda – 7 Up, Sprite, etc.
- Root beer, orange, grape, and cherry soda, and various other fruit and herb–flavored soft drinks are used, but typically they have not been as popular as the drinks listed above.
- Tonic water - The essential ingredient is quinine. Sugar and other flavorings are also commonly added.

== Dairy products ==
Milk products add a smoothing effect to the feel of the drink to counteract the burn of the alcohol. They also turn the drinks opaque, usually enhancing and lightening the color of the drink.

- Cream
- Eggnog
- Half and half
- Ice cream
- Milk

== Juices ==
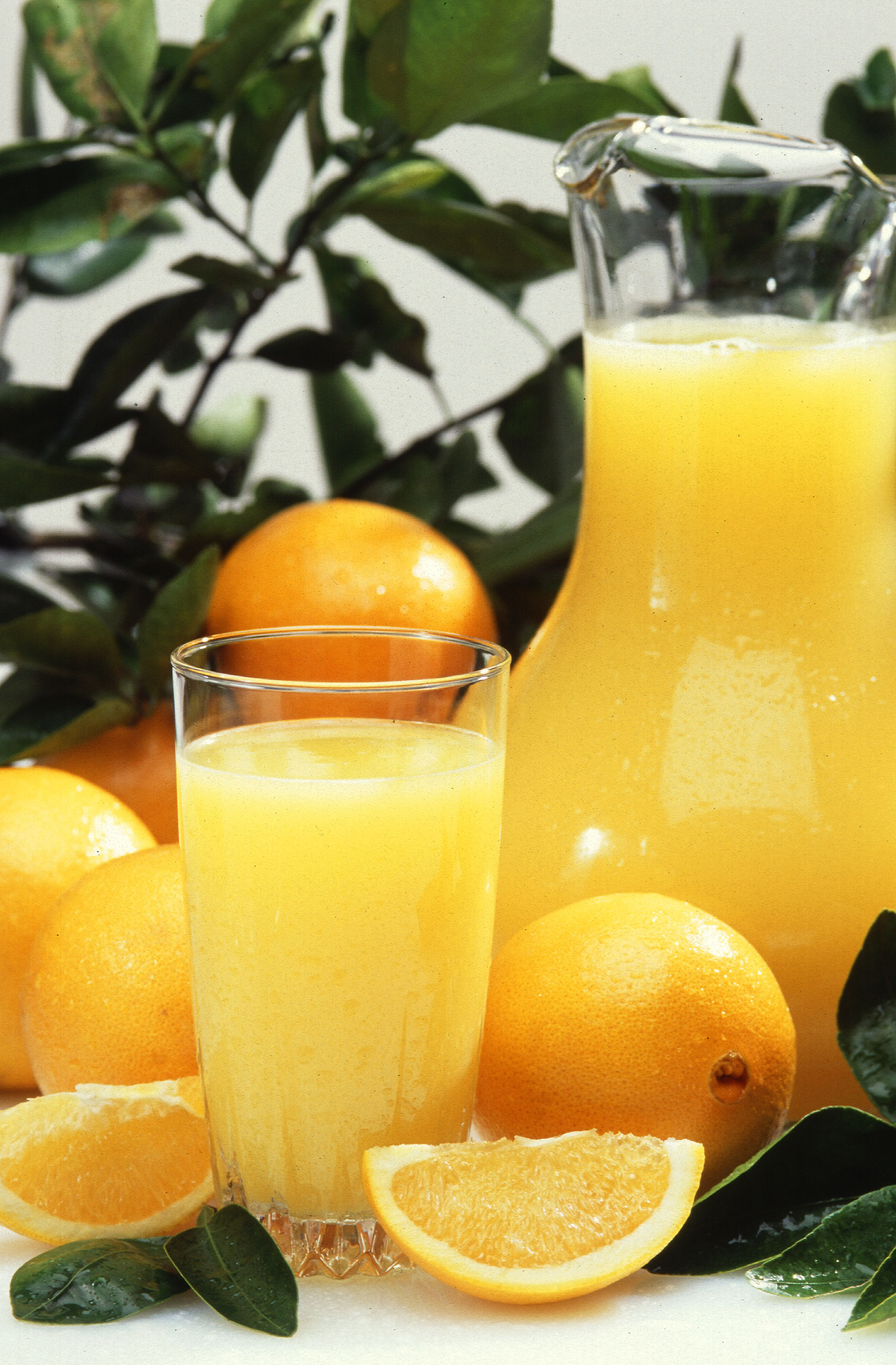
Orange juice

Juices are flavorful additions. Some add sweetness, others add a sour tang, and add a sweet-tart sensation. Fruit juices are common additions to rum-based cocktails.

- Apple cider (not to be confused with cider, known as hard cider in the U.S.)
- Coconut milk or coconut water
- Cranberry juice
- Grape juice
- Grapefruit juice
- Lemon juice
- Lemonade
- Lime juice, unsweetened
- Limeade
- Olive juice
- Orange juice
- Pineapple juice
- Tomato juice – plain or flavored (V–8, Clamato, etc.)
- Wheatgrass juice

== Prepared mixes ==
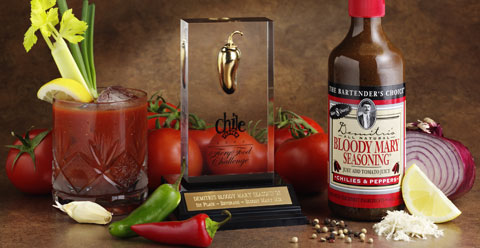
Bloody Mary mix (far right)

Some suppliers now manufacture pre-made mixes, which contain all the ingredients for a particular drink pre-mixed. The only thing that needs to be added is alcohol.

Some ingredients may be homogenized to form an emulsion with the aid of an emulsifier containing refined vegetable oil. The process prevents the separation of alcohol and cream during storage for example.

- Bloody Mary mix
- Cosmopolitan mix
- Hot Toddy mix
- Margarita mix
- Mojito mix
- Mudslide mix
- Strawberry Daiquiri mix
- Hot buttered rum mix

== Sauces ==
The addition of a sauce usually imparts a surprising new taste to a familiar drink. Hot sauces are commonly used in drinking games.

- Honey
- Hot sauce – Tabasco sauce, etc.
- Worcestershire sauce

== Syrups ==
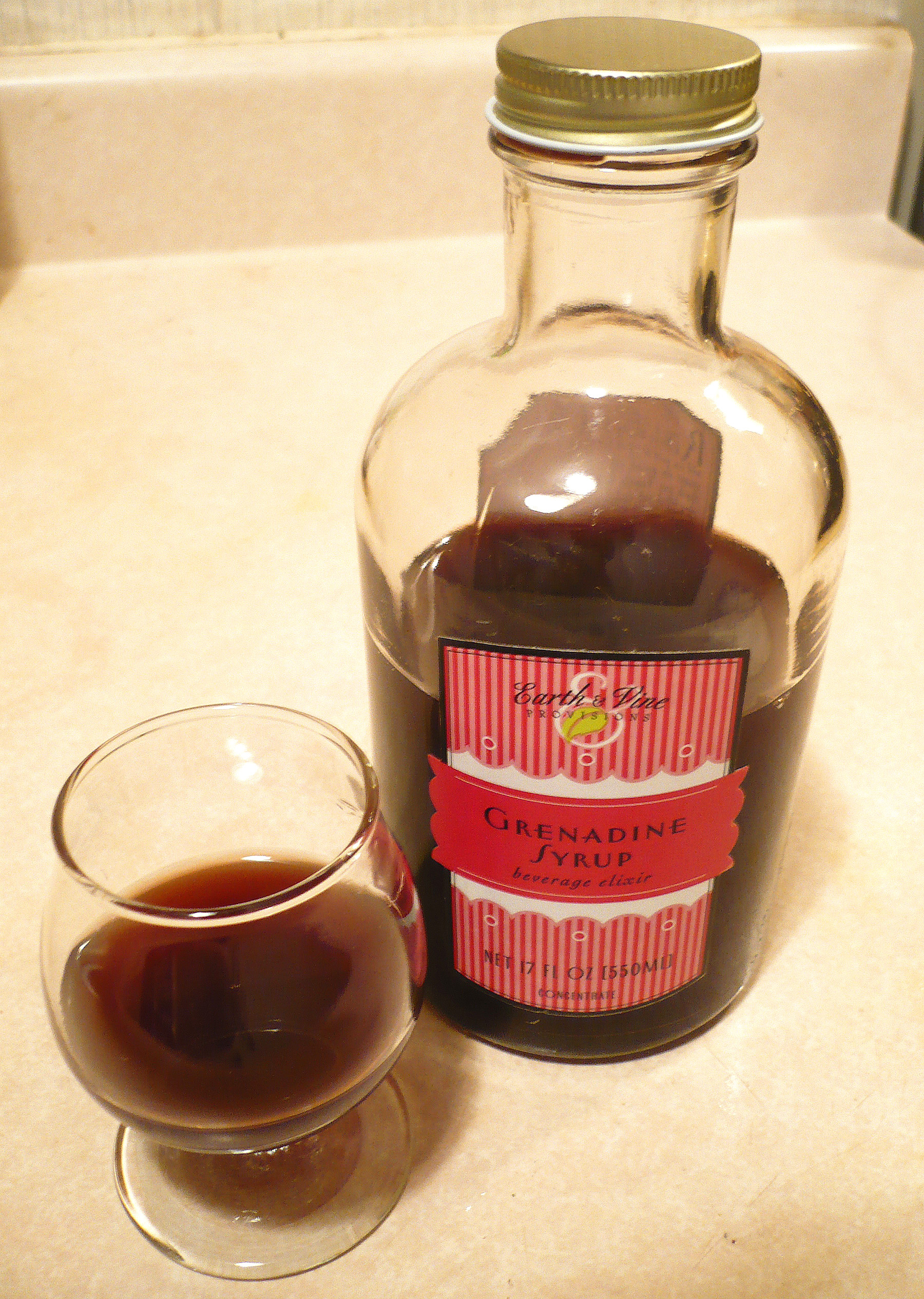
Grenadine syrup

The key ingredient in a syrup is sugar, which sweetens any drink into which it is mixed. Other flavors are often added to a sugar syrup.

- Demerara syrup – A combination of Demerara sugar, a natural brown sugar, and water.
- Falernum – Of Caribbean origin, flavored with almonds, ginger and/or cloves, and lime.
- Fassionola - A passion fruit, orange and guava juice syrup; variations include hibiscus and strawberry flavors
- Grenadine – Originally made from pomegranate juice, modern varieties vary in composition.
- Lime juice, sweetened – Rose's lime juice, etc.
- Orgeat – Flavored with almonds and either rose water or orange flower water.
- Simple syrup – A combination of granulated sugar and water.
- Sour mix – Also known as sweet and sour mix, a combination of simple syrup and lemon or lime juice.
- Squash – A concentrated fruit- or herbal-flavored syrup.

== Other mixers ==
Many other food and beverage items can be used in mixed drinks. These are some other common ones.

- Egg – egg whites thicken and increase the foaminess of blended drinks.
- Food coloring
- Sports drink – Gatorade, SunnyD, etc.

== See also ==
- Cocktail garnish
- List of cocktails
- Mixed drink shooters and drink shots

Categories

- Category:Drink mixers
- Category:Mixed drinks
- Category:Soft drinks
