= Tonic water =

Carbonated soft drink containing quinine

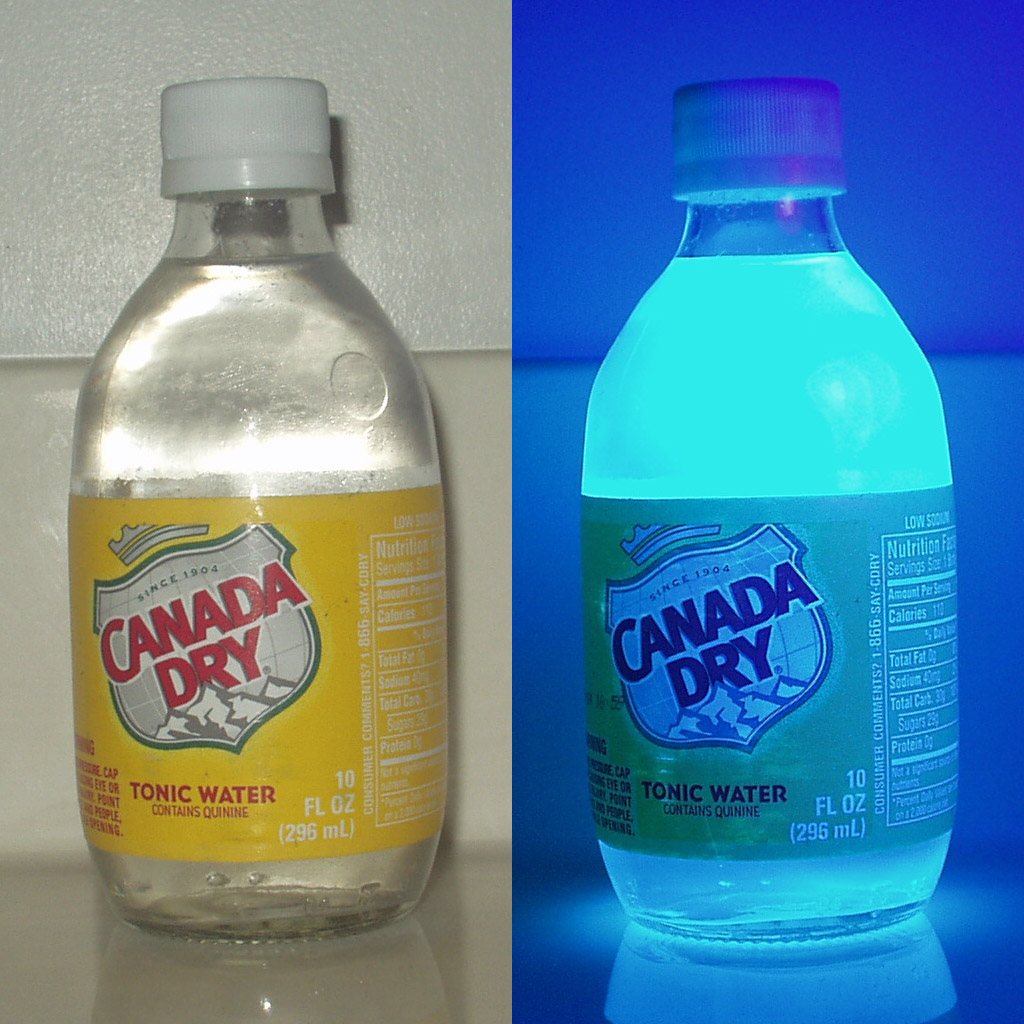
Under ultraviolet light, the quinine in tonic water fluoresces, as seen with this bottle of Canada Dry tonic water.

Tonic water is a carbonated soft drink in which quinine is dissolved. Originally used as a prophylactic against malaria, modern tonic water typically has a significantly lower quinine content and is often more sweetened than the original medicinal form. It is consumed for its distinctive bitter flavour.

== History ==
As early as the 17th century, the Spanish used quinine from the bark of Cinchona trees to treat malaria after being shown the remedy from the Indigenous peoples of Peru, Bolivia, and Ecuador.

In early 19th century India and other tropical posts of the British Empire, medicinal quinine was recommended to British officials and soldiers to prevent malaria, where it was mixed with soda and sugar to mask its bitter taste, creating tonic water.

The first commercial tonic water was produced in 1858 when a new invention "An improved aerated liquid" known as Quinine Tonic Water was patented by the owner of Pitt & Co., Erasmus Bond and manufactured at their Wharf Road, City Road London factory. The mixed drink gin and tonic also originated in British colonial India, when the British mixed their medicinal quinine tonic with gin and other ingredients to make the bitter medicine more palatable. Soldiers in India were already given a gin ration, so the concoction was easy to make. In 1868, the first known record of a gin and tonic was in the Oriental Sporting Magazine and was described as a refreshing cocktail for spectators of horse racing, not as a medicine.

== Quinine content ==
Medicinal tonic water originally contained only carbonated water and a large amount of quinine. Most modern tonic waters contain comparatively less quinine, and are often enhanced by citrus flavours. As a result of the lower quinine content, tonic water is less bitter. It is also usually sweetened, often with the addition of high-fructose corn syrup or sugar. Some manufacturers also produce diet (or "slimline") tonic water, which may contain sugar substitutes such as aspartame. Traditional-style tonic water with high amounts of quinine and carbonated water is less common, but may be preferred by those who desire the bitter flavour.

In the United States, the US Food and Drug Administration (FDA) limits the quinine content in tonic water to 83 ppm (83 mg per litre). In Europe, the limit is 100 mg/L, which is 0.25–0.50% of the original strength. The therapeutic dose of quinine is 10 mg per kg of body mass every eight hours for effective malaria prevention (2,100 mg daily for a 70-kilogram (150 lb) adult).

Until about 2010, quinine was often recommended as a relief for leg cramps, although medical research suggested some care was needed in monitoring doses. Because of quinine's risks, the FDA cautions consumers against using "off-label" quinine drugs to treat leg cramps.

== Use ==
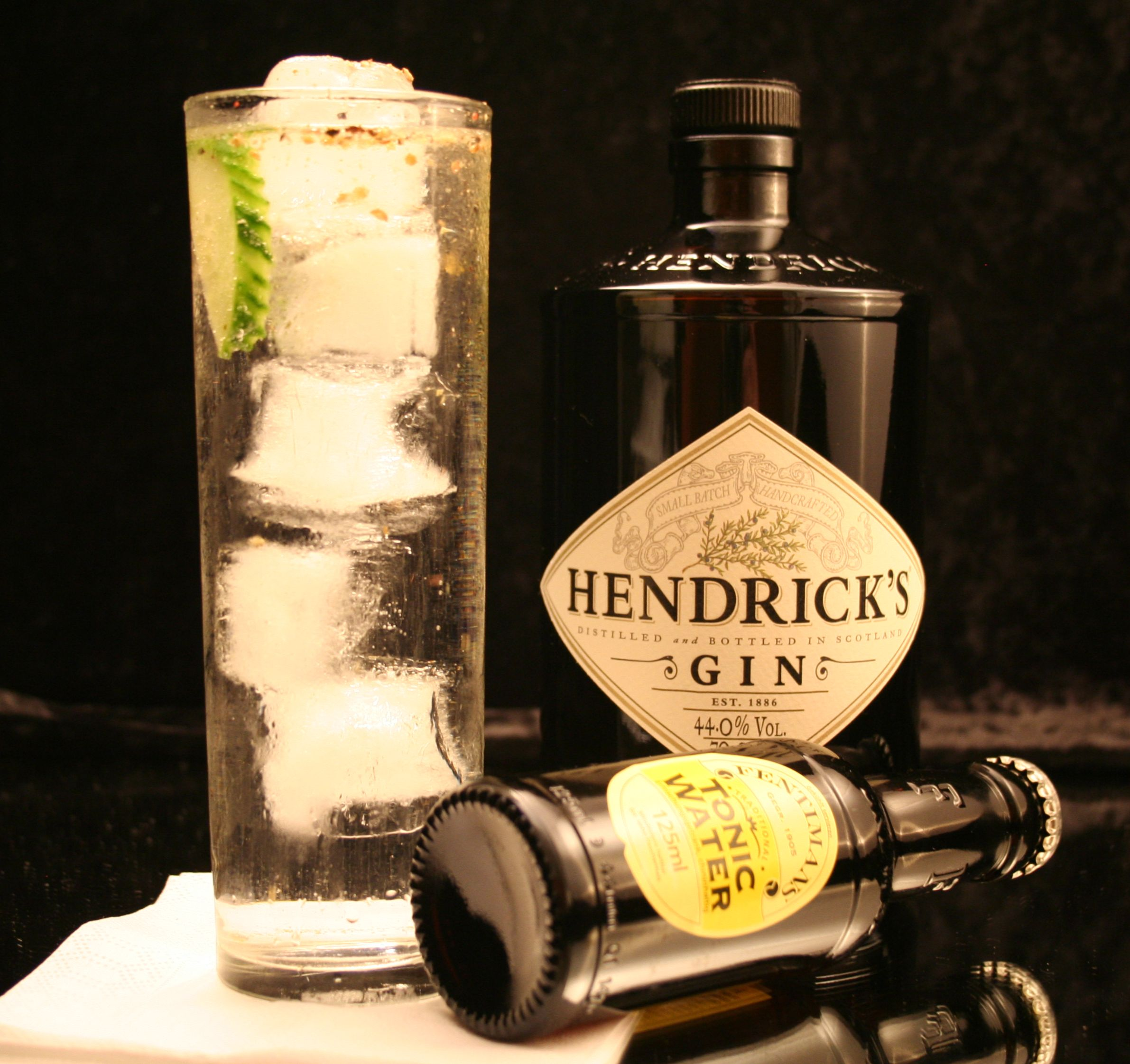
Gin and tonic

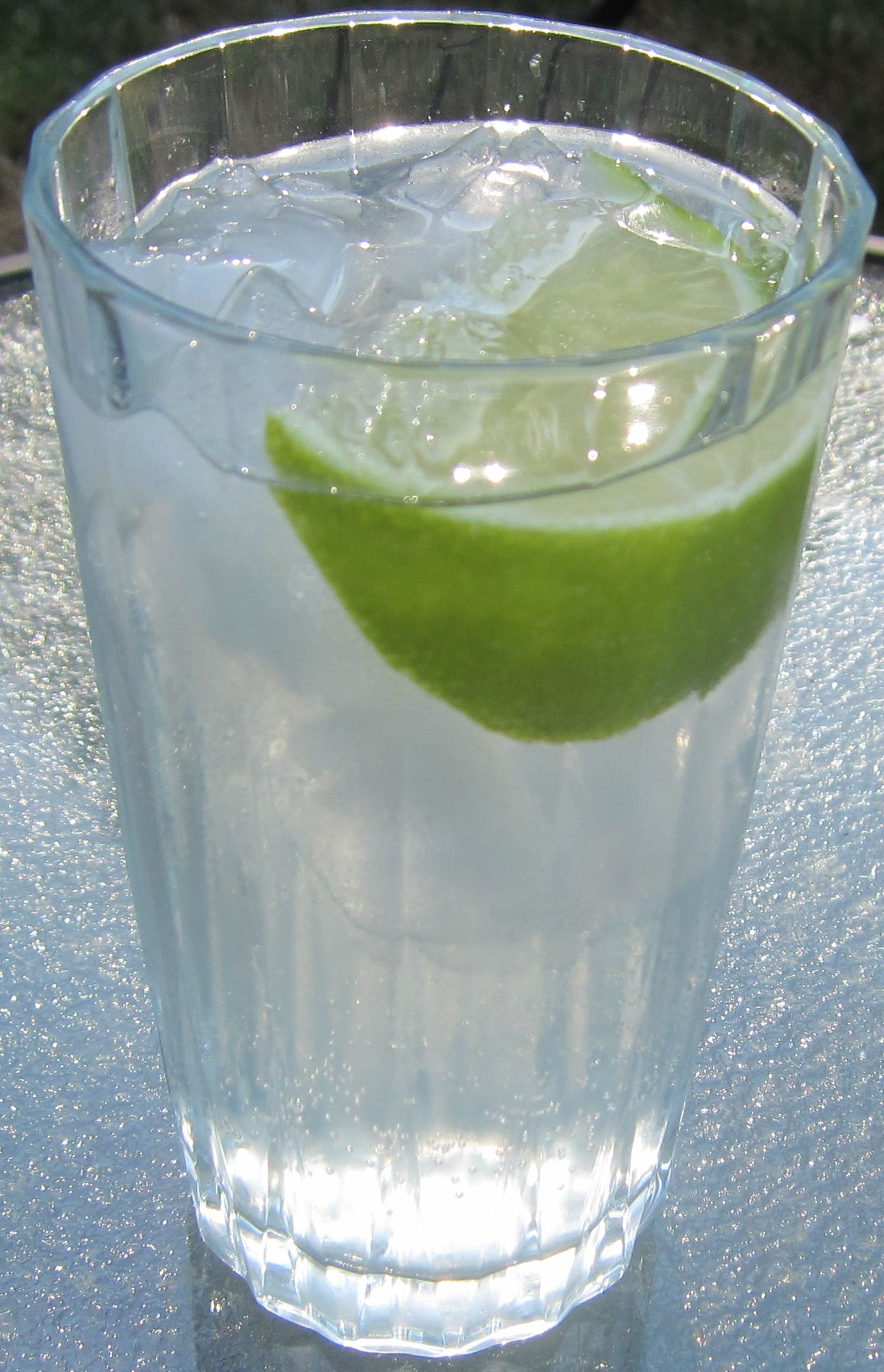
Tequila and tonic cocktail

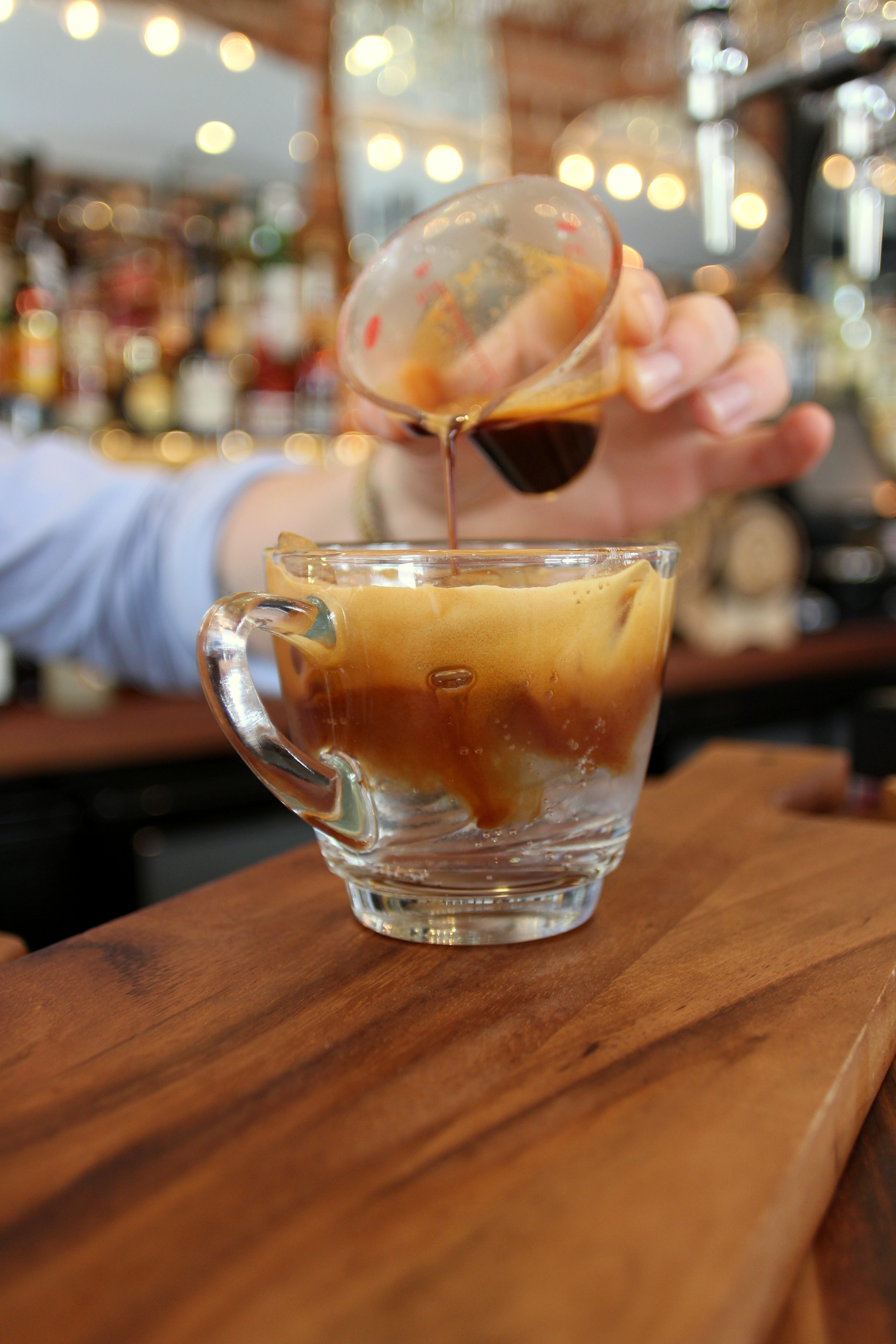
Espresso and tonic

Tonic water is often used as a drink mixer for cocktails, especially gin and tonic. Vodka tonic is also popular. Tonic water with lemon or lime juice added is often known as bitter lemon or bitter lime. It is popular for its signature bittersweet taste. Another use of tonic water is in coffee. The espresso and tonic was created in Helsingborg, Sweden, at Koppi Roasters after a staff party where they mixed tonic water, syrup, and an espresso. Since 2007, the drink has grown in popularity in Scandinavia, Europe, and the United States.

== Negative effects ==
Tonic water is known to cause fixed eruptions, which is a type of skin reaction to drugs, due to the quinine content. Various scientific journals have reported that repeated intake of tonic water can cause fixed eruptions with varying severity, with one reporting the onset of Stevens–Johnson syndrome. The cases of fixed eruptions were seen after the patients drank tonic water, by itself or mixed with gin. Some symptoms of fixed eruptions include pigmented macules, high fever, erythematous plaques, and bullae.

Quinine acts as a neuromuscular blocker; consequently, the consumption of tonic water can exacerbate muscle weakness in individuals with myasthenia gravis.

== Fluorescence ==
The quinine in tonic water will fluoresce under ultraviolet light. In fact, quinine will visibly fluoresce in direct sunlight against a dark background. The quinine molecules release energy as light instead of heat, which is more common. The state is not stable, and the molecules will immediately return to a ground state and no longer glow once the UV source is removed.

== See also ==
- Água de Inglaterra
